= 1953 All-American Girls Professional Baseball League season =

- League: All-American Girls Professional Baseball League
- Sport: Baseball
- Teams: Six

Regular season
- Season champions: Fort Wayne Daisies

Shaugnessy playoffs
- Champions: Grand Rapids Chicks

AAGPBL seasons
- 1952 1954

The 1953 All-American Girls Professional Baseball League season marked the eleventh season of the circuit. The teams Fort Wayne Daisies, Grand Rapids Chicks, Kalamazoo Lassies, Muskegon Belles, Rockford Peaches and South Bend Blue Sox competed through a 110-game schedule, while the Shaugnessy playoffs featured the top four teams. This time, the postseason was reduced to a best-of-three series for both rounds.

The AAGPBL had six teams in 1953, the only change in its lineup being that the Battle Creek Belles had transferred and become the Muskegon Belles. The league was still using a 10 inches ball, but some changes were made to the game to make it more competitive and exciting. The base paths were lengthened from 72 feet to 75 feet and another foot was added to pitching distance, making it 56 feet. Nevertheless, the new changes had little impact on the game, as the high batting averages and low ERA's remained almost intact compared to the previous year. Joanne Weaver of Fort Wayne won her second batting title in a row with a .346 average, while Jean Faut of South Bend topped the pitching list with a 1.51 ERA. No pitcher won 20 games for the first time in league history. Faut and Grand Rapids' Eleanor Moore tied for first with 17 wins, while Fort Wayne's Betty Foss amassed 144 hits, that would eventually become a single-season record. Faut, who also led the league in strikeouts (143) and hurled her second career perfect game, was honored with the Player of the Year Award, her second in three years.

In the first round of the postseason, first place Fort Wayne faced third place Kalamazoo and second place Grand Rapids drew fourth place Rockford. After a 12-inning, 3–1 victory of Fort Wayne in the series opener, Kalamazoo pitchers Dorothy Naum and Kay Blumetta silenced the powerful Daisies batters in the next two games by scores of 2–1 and 5–3, respectively. In Game 2, Naum helped herself by batting a home run and Jean Lovell singled in the winning run in the top of the 10th inning. Lovell also drove in two runs in Game 3 to help the Lassies advance to the final round.

In the other series, Rockford connected 14 hits in Game 1 and pounded the Chicks, 9–2, while Rose Gacioch scattered eight hits and struck out four batters in a complete game victory. But Earlene Risinger pitched a six-hit, 2–0 shutout in the next game to tie the series. In Game 3, Dorothy Mueller held Rockford to eight hits in a 4–3 win to send Grand Rapids into the finals.

The Chicks swept the Lassies in the final series. In Game 1, Mary Lou Studnicka gave up seven hits and fanned seven in an eight-inning win, 5–2, while Eleanor Moore was credited with the save. Joyce Ricketts led the attack with two runs batted in. Risinger continued her winning ways in Game 2, giving up three runs on seven hits while striking out nine en route to a 4–3 victory. Once again, Ricketts drove in two runs and Risinger even contributed to her own cause with two RBI, to whip Kalamazoo for the championship in a cold-weather, shortened seven-inning game.

== Teams ==
1953 All-American Girls Professional Baseball League Teams
Team	City	Stadium
Fort Wayne Daisies	Fort Wayne, Indiana	Memorial Park
Grand Rapids Chicks	Grand Rapids, Michigan	South High School Field
Kalamazoo Lassies	Kalamazoo, Michigan	Catholic Athletic Association Field
Muskegon Belles	Muskegon, Michigan	Marsh Field
Rockford Peaches	Rockford, Illinois	Beyer Stadium
South Bend Blue Sox	South Bend, Indiana	Playland Park

== Map of teams ==
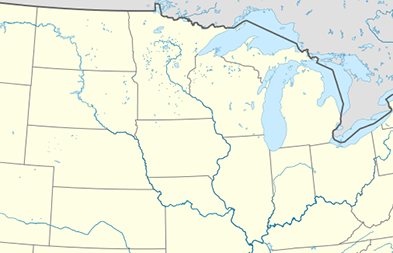
All-American Girls Professional Baseball League teams

== Standings ==
Rank	Team	W	L	W-L%	GB
1	Fort Wayne Daisies	66	39	.629	—
2	Grand Rapids Chicks	62	44	.585	4½
3	Kalamazoo Lassies	56	50	.528	10½
4	Rockford Peaches	51	55	.481	15½
5	South Bend Blue Sox	44	62	.415	22½
6	Muskegon Belles	38	67	.362	28

== Postseason ==
First round Best of three series
1	Fort Wayne Daisies	1
3	Kalamazoo Lassies	2
2	Grand Rapids Chicks	2
4	Rockford Peaches	1

Second round Best of three series
3	Kalamazoo Lassies	0
2	Grand Rapids Chicks	2

== Batting statistics ==
Statistic	Player	Record
Batting average	Joanne Weaver (FW); Delores Brumfield (FW); Betty Foss (FW); Alice Pollitt (ROC); Jane Stoll (KAL); Eleanor Callow (ROC); Jean Geissinger (FW); Doris Satterfield (GR); Catherine Horstman (FW); Joyce Ricketts (GR); Rose Gacioch (ROC); Dorothy Schroeder (KAL); Jean Faut (SB); June Peppas (KAL)	.346.332.321.315.308.303.295.295.292.288.285.285.275.271
Runs scored	Betty Foss (FW); Jean Smith (GR); Joanne Weaver (FW); Dorothy Schroeder (KAL); Wilma Briggs (FW); Marilyn Olinger (GR); Margaret Russo (MUS); Eleanor Callow (ROC); Doris Satterfield (GR); Joan Berger (ROC); Dorothy Harrell (ROC); Inez Voyce (GR); Jean Geissinger (FW); Mary Froning (SB); Delores Brumfield (FW); Joyce Ricketts (GR); Gertrude Dunn (SB); June Peppas (KAL); Catherine Horstman (FW)	99; 86; 79; 76; 75; 67; 65; 58; 58; 56; 56; 55; 50; 50; 48; 48; 46; 46; 44
Hits	Betty Foss (FW); Joanne Weaver (FW); Gertrude Dunn (SB); Jane Stoll (KAL); Joyce Ricketts (GR); Doris Satterfield (GR); Eleanor Callow (ROC); Jean Geissinger (FW); June Peppas (KAL); Dorothy Schroeder (KAL); Wilma Briggs (FW); Inez Voyce (GR)	144; 142; 122; 122; 120; 119; 117; 117; 113; 111; 104; 103
Doubles	Eleanor Callow (ROC); Jean Geissinger (FW); Betty Foss (FW); Jean Smith (GR); Joyce Ricketts (GR); Jane Stoll (KAL); Joanne Weaver (FW); Gertrude Dunn (SB); Doris Satterfield (GR); Jean Cione (MUS); Wilma Briggs (FW); Alice Pollitt (ROC); Delores Brumfield (FW); Catherine Horstman (FW); Dorothy Schroeder (KAL); Inez Voyce (GR); June Peppas (KAL)	23; 21; 20; 20; 19; 18; 18; 17; 16; 15; 14; 14; 13; 12; 12; 11; 10
Triples	Jean Geissinger (FW); Margaret Russo (MUS); Betty Foss (FW); Catherine Horstman (FW); Rose Gacioch (ROC); Joanne Weaver (FW); Wilma Briggs (FW); Alice Pollitt (ROC); Joyce Ricketts (GR); Eleanor Callow (ROC); Doris Satterfield (GR); Inez Voyce (GR); Delores Brumfield (FW); June Peppas (KAL); Jean Smith (GR)	10; 9; 8; 7; 6; 6; 5; 5; 5; 4; 4; 4; 3; 3; 3
Home runs	Wilma Briggs (FW); Eleanor Callow (ROC); Jean Geissinger (FW); Dorothy Schroeder (KAL); Inez Voyce (GR); Joyce Ricketts (GR); Betty Foss (FW); Joanne Weaver (FW); Jean Faut (SB); Catherine Horstman (FW); Mary Taylor (FW); Marjorie Pieper (MUS); Jane Stoll (KAL); Betty Wanless (GR)	9; 8; 8; 6; 6; 5; 5; 5; 4; 4; 4; 3; 3; 3
Runs batted in	Jean Geissinger (FW); Doris Satterfield (GR); Joanne Weaver (FW); Joyce Ricketts (GR); Betty Foss (FW); Jane Stoll (KAL); Inez Voyce (GR); Wilma Briggs (FW); Eleanor Callow (ROC); Ruth Richard (ROC); Catherine Horstman (FW); Jean Cione (MUS); Alice Pollitt (ROC); Dorothy Schroeder (KAL); Jean Faut (SB); Marjorie Pieper (MUS); Betty Wanless (GR)	81; 79; 76; 71; 65; 65; 60; 59; 58; 48; 46; 41; 39; 39; 38; 38; 35
Stolen bases	Betty Foss (FW); Jean Smith (GR); Joanne Weaver (FW); Marilyn Olinger (GR); Betty Wanless (GR); Margaret Russo (MUS); Doris Satterfield (GR); Eleanor Callow (ROC); Wilma Briggs (FW); Mary Froning (SB); Jean Geissinger (FW); Gertrude Dunn (SB); Inez Voyce (GR)	80; 73; 70; 56; 48; 45; 40; 37; 33; 32; 28; 26; 22
Total bases	Betty Foss (FW); Joanne Weaver (FW); Jean Geissinger (FW); Eleanor Callow (ROC); Joyce Ricketts (GR); Wilma Briggs (FW); Jane Stoll (KAL); Doris Satterfield (GR); Gertrude Dunn (SB); Dorothy Schroeder (KAL); Inez Voyce (GR); Alice Pollitt (ROC); Catherine Horstman (FW); June Peppas (KAL); Jean Smith (GR); Margaret Russo (MUS)	195; 187; 182; 172; 164; 155; 149; 143; 141; 141; 140; 136; 134; 129; 124; 122

== Pitching statistics ==
Statistic	Player	Record
Wins	Jean Faut (SB); Eleanor Moore (GR); Jaynne Bittner (FW); Maxine Kline (FW); Pat Scott (FW); Rose Gacioch (ROC); Earlene Risinger (GR); Marilyn Jones (MUS); Dorothy Naum (KAL); Gloria Cordes (KAL); Glenna Sue Kidd (SB); Dolores Lee (ROC); Dorothy Mueller (GR); Migdalia Pérez (ROC); Mary Lou Studnicka (GR); Catherine Horstman (FW); Janet Rumsey (SB); Agnes Allen (KAL); Kay Blumetta (KAL); Marie Mansfield (ROC)	17; 17; 16; 16; 16; 15; 15; 14; 14; 13; 13; 12; 12; 12; 12; 11; 11; 10; 10; 10
Winning percentage	Eleanor Moore (GR); Jaynne Bittner (FW); Catherine Horstman (FW); Elaine Roth (KAL); Alma Ziegler (GR); Dorothy Mueller (GR); Dorothy Naum (KAL); Jean Faut (SB); Earlene Risinger (GR); Pat Scott (FW); Marilyn Jones (MUS); Rose Gacioch (ROC); Dolores Lee (ROC); Gloria Cordes (KAL); Maxine Kline (FW)	.708.696.688.667.667.632.667.607.600.571.560.556.545.542.533
Earned run average	Jean Faut (SB); Earlene Risinger (GR); Kay Blumetta (KAL); Gloria Cordes (KAL); Eleanor Moore (GR); Ruth Williams (KAL); Dorothy Naum (KAL); Dolores Lee (ROC); Migdalia Pérez (ROC); Elaine Roth (KAL); Catherine Horstman (FW); Glenna Sue Kidd (SB); Janet Rumsey (SB); Jaynne Bittner (FW); Maxine Kline (FW); Mary Lou Studnicka (GR)	1.51; 1.75; 1.98; 1.98; 2.00; 2.12; 2.18; 2.24; 2.25; 2.30; 2.32; 2.34; 2.42; 2.45; 2.49; 2.56
Strikeouts	Jean Faut (SB); Marie Mansfield (ROC); Earlene Risinger (GR); Eleanor Moore (GR); Gloria Cordes (KAL); Nancy Warren (MUS); Marilyn Jones (MUS); Janet Rumsey (SB); Rose Gacioch (ROC); Dorothy Mueller (GR); Maxine Kline (FW); Jaynne Bittner (FW); Dorothy Naum (KAL); Glenna Sue Kidd (SB); Pat Scott (FW); Catherine Horstman (FW); Mary Lou Studnicka (GR)	143; 143; 121; 119; 106; 100; 86; 86; 82; 82; 76; 75; 75; 67; 65; 57; 54
Games pitched	Janet Rumsey (SB); Migdalia Pérez (ROC); Pat Scott (FW); Josephine Hasham (MUS); Glenna Sue Kidd (SB); Maxine Kline (FW); Jaynne Bittner (FW); Marilyn Jones (MUS); Eleanor Moore (GR); Earlene Risinger (GR); Phyllis Baker (MUS); Gloria Cordes (KAL); Jean Faut (SB); Rose Gacioch (ROC); Nancy Warren (MUS); Dorothy Mueller (GR)	35; 34; 32; 31; 31; 31; 30; 30; 30; 30; 29; 29; 29; 29; 29; 28
Complete games	Maxine Kline (FW); Glenna Sue Kidd (SB); Jean Faut (SB); Pat Scott (FW); Rose Gacioch (ROC); Marilyn Jones (MUS); Earlene Risinger (GR); Gloria Cordes (KAL); Josephine Hasham (MUS); Eleanor Moore (GR); Migdalia Pérez (ROC)	26; 25; 24; 24; 23; 22; 22; 20; 20; 20; 20
Shutouts	Maxine Kline (FW); Gloria Cordes (KAL); Jean Faut (SB); Jaynne Bittner (FW); Janet Rumsey (SB); Pat Scott (FW); Several others	7; 6; 5; 4; 4; 4; 3
Innings pitched	Glenna Sue Kidd (SB); Janet Rumsey (SB); Maxine Kline (FW); Pat Scott (FW); Earlene Risinger (GR); Rose Gacioch (ROC); Jean Faut (SB); Eleanor Moore (GR); Migdalia Pérez (ROC); Gloria Cordes (KAL); Marilyn Jones (MUS); Jaynne Bittner (FW); Josephine Hasham (MUS); Nancy Warren (MUS)	258; 249; 246; 238; 231; 229; 226; 221; 220; 218; 218; 209; 206; 200

== See also ==
- 1953 Major League Baseball season
- 1953 Nippon Professional Baseball season
