= 1952 All-American Girls Professional Baseball League season =

- League: All-American Girls Professional Baseball League
- Sport: Baseball
- Teams: Six

Regular season
- Season champions: Fort Wayne Daisies

Shaugnessy playoffs
- Champions: South Bend Blue Sox

AAGPBL seasons
- 1951 1953

The 1952 All-American Girls Professional Baseball League season marked the tenth season of the circuit. The teams Battle Creek Belles, Fort Wayne Daisies, Grand Rapids Chicks, Kalamazoo Lassies, Rockford Peaches and South Bend Blue Sox competed through a 110-game schedule, while the Shaugnessy playoffs featured the top four teams from each half of the regular season.

In 1952 the league was left with six teams, as Kenosha and Peoria folded at the end of the previous season. No changes were made to the game, but attendance continued to decline. Joanne Weaver of Fort Wayne won the batting crown with a .344 average, while her older sister and teammate Betty Foss was honored with the Player of the Year Award. Foss registered the second best average (.331) and led the league in total bases (209), runs scored (81), runs batted in (74), doubles (24) and triples (17). South Bend's Jean Faut won the pitching Triple Crown, after leading the league in earned run average (0.93) and strikeouts (114), while tying with Rockford's Rose Gacioch for the most victories (20). Faut also posted the best win–loss record (.909), that would eventually become the highest in league history. Furthermore, Marilyn Jones of Battle Creek hurled the only no-hitter of the season against Rockford on July 10.

During the best-of-three series, first place Fort Wayne lost to third place Rockford, two games to one, while second place South Bend swept fourth place Grand Rapids. Fort Wayne won the first game, 5–4, in a heroic 10-inning effort by Maxine Kline. But Rockford won the next contest, 4–3, with strong pitching from Rose Gacioch, who limited the powerful Daisies to a run after struggling in the first inning. In Game 3, Migdalia Pérez scattered six hits in a 6–0 shutout against Fort Wayne, while receiving offensive support from Jean Buckley, who went 4-for-4 with four RBI. In the other series, South Bend disposed of Grand Rapids in two games. Jean Faut struck out nine Chicks in a three-hit, 2–1 victory while facing Alma Ziegler in Game 1. Then, Glenna Sue Kidd defeated Earlene Risinger and Grand Rapids in Game 2, 6–1, to face Rockford in the finals. South Bend clinched the title over the Peaches, 3 to 2 games. Once more Faut was brilliant in the final series, winning two games and batting an average of .300 (6-for-20) with two triples and three RBI, while leading the Blue Sox to their second championship in a row.

Attendance continued to decline, but no figures are available. For the second consecutive year Battle Creek failed to capture a sustainable fan base. The team would be relocated and renamed Muskegon Belles for the next season.

== Teams ==
1952 All-American Girls Professional Baseball League Teams
Team	City	Stadium
Battle Creek Belles	Battle Creek, Michigan	Bailey Park
Fort Wayne Daisies	Fort Wayne, Indiana	Memorial Park
Grand Rapids Chicks	Grand Rapids, Michigan	Bigelow Field
Kalamazoo Lassies	Kalamazoo, Michigan	Lindstrom Field
Rockford Peaches	Rockford, Illinois	Beyer Stadium
South Bend Blue Sox	South Bend, Indiana	Playland Park

== Map of teams ==
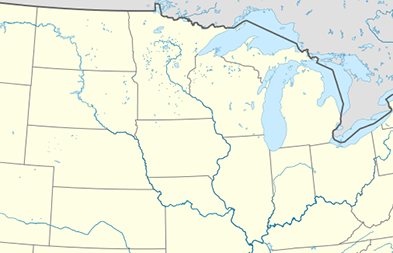
All-American Girls Professional Baseball League teams

== Standings ==
Rank	Team	W	L	W-L%	GB
1	Fort Wayne Daisies	67	42	.613	—
2	South Bend Blue Sox	64	45	.587	3
3	Rockford Peaches	55	54	.505	10
4	Grand Rapids Chicks	50	60	.455	17½
5	Kalamazoo Lassies	49	60	.450	18
6	Battle Creek Belles	43	67	.344	24

== Postseason ==
First round Best of three series
1	Fort Wayne Daisies	1
3	Rockford Peaches	2
2	South Bend Blue Sox	2
4	Grand Rapids Chicks	0

Second round Best of five series
3	Rockford Peaches	2
2	South Bend Blue Sox	3

== Batting statistics ==
Statistic	Player	Record
Batting average	Joanne Weaver (FW); Betty Foss (FW); Doris Sams (KAL); Jane Stoll (SB); Inez Voyce (GR); Betty Wagoner (SB); Jean Faut (SB); Doris Satterfield (GR); Ruth Richard (ROC); Jean Geissinger (FW/GR); Joyce Hill (SB); Jean Cione (BC); Wilma Briggs (FW); Alice Pollitt (ROC)	.344.331.314.301.295.295.291.285.284.280.277.275.275.270
Runs scored	Betty Foss (FW); Thelma Eisen (FW); Dorothy Schroeder (FW); Betty Wagoner (SB); Connie Wisniewski (GR); Joanne Weaver (FW); Inez Voyce (GR); Eleanor Callow (ROC); Joan Berger (ROC); Josephine Lenard (SB); Doris Sams (KAL); Wilma Briggs (FW); Alice Pollitt (ROC); Jane Stoll (SB); Jean Cione (BC); Doris Satterfield (GR)	81; 77; 67; 64; 64; 58; 57; 56; 54; 49; 47; 46; 45; 45; 43; 43
Hits	Betty Foss (FW); Doris Sams (KAL); Inez Voyce (GR); Jean Geissinger (FW/GR); Alice Pollitt (ROC); Ruth Richard (ROC); Thelma Eisen (FW); Doris Satterfield (GR); June Peppas (KAL); Joanne Weaver (FW); Wilma Briggs (FW); Eleanor Callow (ROC)	137; 128; 115; 114; 113; 112; 110; 110; 108; 108; 102; 101
Doubles	Betty Foss (FW); Doris Sams (KAL); Jean Cione (BC); Inez Voyce (GR); Jean Geissinger (FW/GR); Wilma Briggs (FW); Josephine Lenard (SB); Gertrude Dunn (SB); Several Others	26; 25; 17; 16; 16; 16; 15; 15; 14
Triples	Betty Foss (FW); Marjorie Pieper (BC); Alice Pollitt (ROC); Eleanor Callow (ROC); Joan Berger (ROC); Catherine Horstman (FW); Dorothy Schroeder (FW); Ruth Richard (ROC); Jean Geissinger (FW/GR); Betty Foss (FW); Joanne Weaver (FW); Wilma Briggs (FW); Jane Stoll (SB); Inez Voyce (GR)	17; 8; 7; 6; 6; 6; 5; 5; 5; 5; 5; 4; 3; 3
Home runs	Doris Sams (KAL); Inez Voyce (GR); Eleanor Callow (ROC); Dorothy Schroeder (FW); Jean Geissinger (FW/GR); Betty Foss (FW); Marjorie Pieper (BC); Wilma Briggs (FW); Jean Marlowe (KAL); Ruth Richard (ROC); Joanne Weaver (FW)	12; 10; 8; 6; 5; 4; 4; 3; 3; 3; 3
Runs batted in	Betty Foss (FW); Jane Stoll (SB); Doris Sams (KAL); Jean Geissinger (FW/GR); Inez Voyce (GR); Doris Satterfield (GR); Wilma Briggs (FW); Joanne Weaver (FW); Eleanor Callow (ROC); Josephine Lenard (SB); Marjorie Pieper (BC); Ruth Richard (ROC); Dorothy Schroeder (FW)	74; 60; 57; 56; 54; 51; 50; 50; 49; 47; 47; 46; 43
Stolen bases	Charlene Pryer (SB); Betty Foss (FW); Thelma Eisen (FW); Josephine Lenard (SB); Dorothy Harrell (ROC); Ernestine Petras (BC); Doris Satterfield (GR); Betty Wagoner (SB); Eleanor Callow (ROC); Alice Pollitt (ROC); Connie Wisniewski (GR); Jane Stoll (SB); Joyce Hill (SB)	59; 56; 54; 47; 46; 42; 40; 40; 39; 35; 35; 21; 20
Total bases	Betty Foss (FW); Doris Sams (KAL); Inez Voyce (GR); Jean Geissinger (FW/GR); Eleanor Callow (ROC); Ruth Richard (ROC); Doris Satterfield (GR); Joanne Weaver (FW); Alice Pollitt (ROC); Dorothy Schroeder (FW); Wilma Briggs (FW); Jane Stoll (SB); Joan Berger (ROC); Josephine Lenard (SB); Marjorie Pieper (BC)	209; 195; 167; 155; 151; 145; 138; 137; 136; 136; 135; 127; 124; 106; 105

== Pitching statistics ==
Statistic	Player	Record
Wins	Jean Faut (SB); Rose Gacioch (ROC); Maxine Kline (FW); Pat Scott (FW); Nancy Warren (FW); Gloria Cordes (KAL); Margaret Holgerson (GR); Glenna Sue Kidd (SB); Jacquelyn Kelley (ROC); Josephine Hasham (BC); Jaynne Bittner (GR/FW); Migdalia Pérez (BC/ROC); Mary Lou Studnicka (GR); Earlene Risinger (GR); Gloria Schweigerdt (BC); Ruth Williams (KAL)	20; 20; 19; 17; 17; 16; 14; 13; 12; 12; 11; 11; 11; 10; 10; 10
Winning percentage	Jean Faut (SB); Maxine Kline (FW); Catherine Horstman (FW); Pat Scott (FW); Nancy Warren (FW); Gloria Cordes (KAL); Rose Gacioch (ROC); Glenna Sue Kidd (SB); Margaret Holgerson (GR); Marilyn Jones (BC); Helen Nicol (ROC); Jacquelyn Kelley (ROC)	.909.731.714.708.708.667.667.650.609.563.533.522
Earned run average	Jean Faut (SB); Gloria Cordes (KAL); Marilyn Jones (BC); Dorothy Mueller (SB); Rose Gacioch (ROC); Maxine Kline (FW); Glenna Sue Kidd (SB); Pat Scott (FW); Nancy Warren (FW); Janet Rumsey (SB); Migdalia Pérez (BC/ROC); Earlene Risinger (GR); Catherine Horstman (FW); Margaret Holgerson (GR); Georgette Vincent (SB)	0.93; 1.44; 1.69; 1.82; 1.88; 1.93; 2.00; 2.13; 2.14; 2.22; 2.34; 2.34; 2.35; 2.36; 2.36
Strikeouts	Jean Faut (SB); Nancy Warren (FW); Gloria Cordes (KAL); Earlene Risinger (GR); Margaret Holgerson (GR); Jacquelyn Kelley (ROC); Maxine Kline (FW); Mary Lou Studnicka (GR); Georgette Vincent (SB); Glenna Sue Kidd (SB); Pat Scott (FW); Rose Gacioch (ROC); Marilyn Jones (BC); Gloria Schweigerdt (BC); Ruth Williams (KAL)	114; 91; 84; 82; 78; 73; 70; 70; 65; 64; 60; 48; 46; 44; 41
Games pitched	Josephine Hasham (BC); Migdalia Pérez (BC/ROC); Rose Gacioch (ROC); Maxine Kline (FW); Eleanor Moore (FW); Gloria Schweigerdt (BC); Mary Lou Studnicka (GR); Earlene Risinger (GR); Janet Rumsey (SB); Jaynne Bittner (GR/FW)	33; 33; 31; 28; 28; 28; 28; 27; 26; 25
Innings pitched	Rose Gacioch (ROC); Maxine Kline (FW); Josephine Hasham (BC); Nancy Warren (FW); Gloria Cordes (KAL); Migdalia Pérez (BC/ROC); Pat Scott (FW); Earlene Risinger (GR); Mary Lou Studnicka (GR); Jean Faut (SB)	259; 238; 222; 219; 213; 208; 202; 192; 185; 184

== See also ==
- 1952 Major League Baseball season
- 1952 Nippon Professional Baseball season
