= Glenna Sue Kidd =

- Pitcher / First base
- Born: September 2, 1933; Choctaw, Arkansas, U.S.
- Died: May 4, 2017 (aged 83)
- Batted: Right Threw: Right

Teams
- Springfield Sallies (1949); Muskegon Lassies (1950); Peoria Redwings (1950); South Bend Blue Sox (1950–1954); Battle Creek Belles (1951)

Career highlights and awards
- Two time championship team (1951–1952); Single season leader in innings pitched (1953); Pitched both games of a doubleheader and won both (1953); Women in Baseball – AAGPBL Permanent Display at Baseball Hall of Fame and Museum (1988)

Glenna Sue Kidd (September 2, 1933 – May 4, 2017) was an American pitcher and infielder who played from 1950 through 1954 in the All-American Girls Professional Baseball League (AAGPBL). Listed at 5 ft 8 in (1.73 m), 165 lb., she batted and threw right-handed.

== Biography ==
Glenna Sue Kidd turned into a superb pitcher after a slow start in her rookie season, being instrumental in the South Bend Blue Sox run to the championship titles in 1952 and 1953. A fine control pitcher, Kidd posted a career 0.96 Strikeout-to-walk ratio (270-to-185) and a 1.46 WHIP in 857 innings, and never had an ERA above 2.94 during her five years in the league. When not pitching, she was often the best defensive player at first base.

Born in Choctaw, Arkansas, Glenna Sue was one of six children born to William Marvin and Julia (née Duncan) Kidd, local farmers and merchants. An avid baseball fan, her father managed and played in a semi-professional town team in addition to running a store which contained the local US Post Office, which he also operated. The Kidd children took care of chores at home and duties at the store, but mainly the three boys played baseball on their father's team. Glenna Sue, who began playing with a rubber ball as a toddler, showed enough skill to play with her brothers by the time she was a teenager.

While studying at Clinton High School, Kidd pitched so well that she was allowed to play on the boys' baseball team in 1949 at the age of fifteen. She also excelled in basketball and volleyball, and was voted Outstanding Female Athlete all four years of high school.

Kidd gained notoriety while playing on and against all-male baseball teams in Van Buren County and surrounding areas, being backed up by a pick-up team of male amateur baseball players from Choctaw, Bee Branch and Morganton, which had been put together by her father. She had a hard fastball and an assortment of breaking balls, including a deceptive curveball, which used to defeat the all-male Heber Springs' All-Stars in a nine-inning complete game, a feat that became part of local legend.

In 1949, when the Chicago Colleens and Springfield Sallies AAGPBL travelling teams stopped in Arkansas, Kidd attended a tryout and was taken. She hurled a no-hitter for the Sallies during the exhibition tour, and joined the league as soon as graduated in 1950.

As a 16-year-old, Kidd opened 1950 with the Muskegon Lassies. She was traded to the Peoria Redwings in the midseason and ended the year with South Bend, but not with much success, as her record was 1–10 despite a 2.94 ERA in 141 innings. In 1951, the Blue Sox hired a new manager, Karl Winsch, a former pitching prospect of the Philadelphia Phillies and husband of Jean Faut, the team's ace pitcher. South Bend also had a surplus of pitching talent, which included Dorothy Mueller, Lillian Faralla and Janet Rumsey, so Kidd was loaned briefly to the Battle Creek Belles. Still, she earned respect in its own right, helping South Bend win the regular season title and the championship. She went 11–7 with a 2.51 ERA in 19 games, and eventually was credited with a loss in the postseason.

Her most productive season came in 1952, when she received more run support. Kidd collected a 13–7 record and a 2.00 ERA in 29 pitching appearances, ending seventh in the league for the best ERA, eight in wins and winning percentage (.650), ninth in innings pitched (189), and tenth in strikeouts (64). She was almost untouchable during the postseason, going 1–0 in two games, while allowing only two earned runs in 17 innings of work. South Bend, which went into the playoffs with only 11 players on the roster due to a late-season walkout, claimed the championship for the second year in a row. On strong pitching by Faut and Kidd, the Blue Sox defeated the Fort Wayne Daisies in the first round, 2-to-1 games, and finished off the Rockford Peaches, 3-to-2 games, to complete the feat.

In 1953, Kidd pitched both games of a doubleheader and won both, yet she ended the season with a losing record of 13–15. Nevertheless, she led all pitchers in innings pitched (25) and tied for the most games started (29), while ending second in complete games (25).

Kidd went 9–6 with a 2.91 ERA in 1954, during what turned out to be the last season in league history. She also posted the fourth best ERA, and finished fourth in winning percentage (.600) and tenth in strikeouts (50).

After the league folded, Kidd played from 1953 to 1960 for the South Bend Rockettes, a women's basketball team, winning with them three national championships. She then went to school as a promise to her father and attended Arkansas State Teachers College in Conway, now the University of Central Arkansas, from which she received a Bachelor of Science degree in physical education with a minor in social studies in 1965 and a Master's degree in physical education in 1966.

Kidd began her coaching career and taught physical education for twenty-five years in Onward and Logansport in Indiana, twelve years of which were spent coaching basketball, volleyball, and track and field. She continued playing softball until 1975. After retiring, she was involved in dog grooming business in Arkansas and Indiana.

In 1988, Kidd was present during the opening ceremony of Women in Baseball, a permanent display based at the Baseball Hall of Fame and Museum in Cooperstown, New York, which was unveiled to honor the entire All-American Girls Professional Baseball League. She also had a bit part in the 1992 film A League of Their Own, directed by Penny Marshall, which was a fictionalized account of activities in the AAGPBL. Starring Geena Davis, Tom Hanks, Madonna, Lori Petty and Rosie O'Donnell, this film brought a rejuvenated interest to the extinct league.

== Later life and death ==
After living in Indiana for many years, Kidd returned to her native Choctaw. She never married and had no children.

Glenna Sue Kidd died May 4, 2017.

== Career statistics ==
Pitching

GP	W	L	W-L%	ERA	IP	H	RA	ER	BB	SO	WP	HBP	WHIP	SO/BB
117	47	45	.511	2.49	857	634	353	237	185	270	19	9	0.96	1.46

Batting

GP	AB	R	H	2B	3B	HR	RBI	SB	TB	BB	SO	BA	OBP	SLG
211	585	36	113	11	0	5	59	4	139	36	40	.211	.240	.238

Fielding

GP	PO	A	E	TC	DP	FA
201	465	341	26	832	29	.969
