= Earlene Risinger =

American baseball player (1927–2008)

- Pitcher
- Born: March 20, 1927; Hess, Oklahoma, U.S.
- Died: July 29, 2008 (aged 81); Hess, Oklahoma, U.S.
- Batted: Right Threw: Right

Teams
- Springfield Sallies (1948); Grand Rapids Chicks (1949–1954)

Career highlights and awards
- All-Star Team (1953); AAGPBL champion (1953)

Helen Earlene Risinger (March 20, 1927 – July 29, 2008) was a pitcher who played from 1948 through 1954 in the All-American Girls Professional Baseball League (AAGPBL). Listed at 6' 2", 137 lb., she batted and threw right-handed.

One of the tallest players in the league's history, Earlene Risinger was an All-Star pitcher who helped the Grand Rapids Chicks win a championship title in 1953. Unlike many of the AAGPBL girls she played with, Risinger never played organized softball when she was growing up in Oklahoma and entered the league after full overhand pitching was adopted in 1948.

== Early life ==
Earlene Risinger was born and raised in Hess, a tiny village of Oklahoma with less than thirty people, located in the southwest part of the state just above the Texas border. She was the oldest of four children born into the family of Homer Francis and Lizzie Mae (née Steen) Risinger, and grew up in a sharecropping family surrounded by hard times. Her father worked in a gas station, and when his salary did not stretch far enough, his skill hunting jack rabbits put food on the family table. Meanwhile, her mother was a housewife and had a garden; there were always pinto beans to fill empty stomachs. Tall and slender, her parents dubbed her ″Beans″ because she liked pork and beans for breakfast. She especially enjoyed watching her father play at first base on a sandlot ball team that played on Sunday afternoons.

Mr. Risinger taught his daughter to throw a baseball at an early age, and they played catch almost every day. By the time she was six, Earlene was a regular on Sunday afternoons down at the cow pasture playing ball with her father, her uncles, and her cousins. Baseball ran in the Risinger family, and he taught me to throw 'overhand' from the jump go, she explained in her autobiography.

After graduating in 1945, Risinger had few prospects in her own right, because she did not have money to attend college immediately. Instead, she was forced to work for more than two years in local cotton fields earning 50 cents an hour, thinking this might be her future as there were no factories or anything like that anywhere nearby. I started working in the cotton fields so I could have shoes on my feet and clothes to wear. I was with no future, she clarified.

An avid reader, Risinger stopped daily at the local grocery store after her daily work in the fields, where the sympathetic owner let her read The Oklahoman newspaper without charge. In the spring of 1947, she was reading the newspaper in the store and knew about a traveling All-American Girls baseball team. At the time, she had no idea that girls could play baseball professionally. Then she sent a postcard to the sports page editor, whose by-line appeared in the article. He forwarded her card to the league's office in Chicago, and pretty soon she received a letter asking her to attend a tryout at Oklahoma City. Encouraged by the men of her family, with whom she had been playing baseball and perfecting her pitches for years, the reluctant girl attended the training camp and passed the test. After that, she received an offer to play for the Rockford Peaches, a well-balanced team managed by Bill Allington.

Delighted with the opportunity to play, Risinger borrowed money from a bank and started on a train for Rockford, Illinois, the home of the Peaches. But she became homesick and got only as far as Chicago before returning home. She then went back to the cotton fields to repay the bank loan.

But in 1948 a second chance came. Risinger was scouted again, this time by Shirley Jameson, and the league also expanded to ten teams while creating two divisions. Risinger decided to try again. This time she boarded the train for Springfield, Illinois, where she reported to the expansion Springfield Sallies.

== AAGPBL career ==
=== 1948-1949 ===
In her rookie season, Risinger compiled a 3–8 record with a 3.35 earned run average in 22 games for the awful Sallies, who finished as the worst team in the league, getting roughed up as a last-place club with a 41–84 record, ending 35 and a half games behind the Racine Belles in the Western Division. The Sallies, along with the expansion Chicago Colleens, folded at the end of the season because of poor attendance and a lack of local support. The next year, both franchises became rookie training teams. Some players remained in Colleens and Sallies uniforms while travelling, but other players were sent to teams across the league, Risinger among others. From 1949 through 1954 she played for the Grand Rapids Chicks, a team that became her surrogate family based in a town that she came to call home.

At Grand Rapids, Risinger improved with the guidance of her manager Johnny Rawlings, who taught her the finer points of pitching. In 1949 she went 15–12 with a 2.35 ERA, leading her team in wins while bolstering a strong pitching staff along with Mildred Earp (14-10, 1.83), Lorraine Fisher (13-11, 2.18) and Alice Haylett (9-10, 1.88). She also finished fourth in strikeouts (116), being surpassed only by Rockford's Lois Florreich (210), her Grand Rapids teammate Earp (143), and Jean Faut of the South Bend Blue Sox (120). The Chicks advanced to the playoffs and disposed of the Fort Wayne Daisies in the first round, two to one games, but were beaten by the Rockford Peaches in the semi-final series, three to one games. Risinger went 1–0 with a 0.00 ERA in four innings of relief.

=== 1950-1952 ===
By 1950, the AAGPBL took advantage of overhand pitching as evidenced by a collective .228 batting average compared to a .197 mark the previous season. Eight players batted over .300, with Fort Wayne's Betty Foss winning the batting title with a .346 mark. For the other side, South Bend's Jean Faut led all pitchers in ERA (1.12) and complete games (29), and was one of three 20-win leaders (21) along with Fort Wayne's Maxine Kline (23) and Rockford's Lois Florreich (20). Florreich also topped the league in strikeouts for the second consecutive season (171) and finished second in ERA (.118). Risinger went 14–13, ending sixth in innings pitched (231), seventh in strikeouts (90), and tenth in ERA (2.38). In the first round best-of-five series, Grand Rapids lost to Fort Wayne three to one games. Risinger won Game 1, but was credited with the loss in Game 4.

In 1951, Risinger dropped to an 8–8 mark in 28 games, but posted a solid 2.14 ERA in 171 innings of work. Grand Rapids had the best mark in the first half of the season (39-13) and finished fourth in the second half (32-22), to collect the second-best mark (71-40) behind South Bend (75-36). Fort Wayne's Betty Foss led all hitters for the second year in a row (.368) while Rockford's Rose Gacioch was the only pitcher to win 20 games for the season. In the first round best-of-three series, Rockford swept the favored Grand Rapids team, as Helen Fox pitched a six-hit shutout in Game 1, while Dorothy Kamenshek and Eleanor Callow rallied to a comeback victory in the tenth inning of Game 2.

Risinger had a disappointing season in 1952, going 10–15 with a 2.34 ERA in 27 pitching appearances, even though she ranked fourth in strikeouts (82), eighth in innings (192), and ninth in games pitched. Grand Rapids finished in fourth place (50-60) and made the playoffs, but was swept by South Bend in the first round best-of-three series. Risinger started Game 2 and took the loss, as the Blue Sox made the most of three walks and two errors by scoring three unearned runs off her.

=== 1953 ===
In 1953 Risinger compiled a 15–10 record, reversing the misfortune of her previous season, while enjoying career-numbers with a 1.75 ERA and 121 strikeouts. She also finished second in ERA (0.24 behind South Bend's Jean Faut), third in strikeouts (behind Faut and Rockford's Marie Mansfield, tied with 143), fifth in innings (231) and sixth in complete games (22). In addition, she was selected for the All-Star Team.

Four teams made the playoffs, which were reduced to a best of three series for both rounds. First place Fort Wayne (69-41) faced third place Kalamazoo (50-50), while second place Grand Rapids (65-45) battled fourth place Rockford (52-58). In the first round, the Daisies won Game 1 in extra innings, but Kalamazoo won the next two games to upset the season champion. Meanwhile, Grand Rapids looked to be headed for the same fate after losing Game 1 to Rockford, but Risinger hurled a six-hit shutout in Game 2, leading her team to a 2–0 victory while tying the series. Then Dorothy Mueller went the distance and held off the Peaches, 4–3, to send the Chicks into the final series.

=== Championship Series ===
In the best-of-three final series, the Grand Rapids Chicks, with Woody English at the helm, faced the Kalamazoo Lassies, managed by Mitch Skupien. Grand Rapids swept Kalamazoo to clinch the 1953 Championship Title.

In Game 1, at Grand Rapids, Mary Lou Studnicka limited the Lassies to two runs in eight innings for a 5–2 victory. With the score tied 2–2 going into the fourth inning, the Chicks loaded the bases against Lassies pitcher Gloria Cordes. Then Alma Ziegler drove home one run with a sacrifice fly to put the score in favor of Grand Rapids, 3–2. Another sacrifice fly by Inez Voyce and an RBI single by Joyce Ricketts extended the lead to 5–2. When the Lassies' first two batters reached base in the final inning, manager English brought Eleanor Moore to the rescue. Moore promptly retired the next three batters in order, striking out Isabel Alvarez, retiring Dorothy Schroeder with a pop fly to shortstop Ziegler, and inducing June Peppas on a sharp grounder to the mound throwing to Voyce at first base for the final out of the game.

In Kalamazoo, with cold weather around 40 degrees and windy, both teams’ managers agreed to play Game 2 in just seven innings. Risinger started for Grand Rapids and pitched one of the best games of her career.

=== 1954 ===
Risinger dropped to a 7–13 record and a 4.06 ERA in 1954, ranking fourth in the league for the most innings pitched (153). Fort Wayne, managed by Bill Allington, repeated the regular season title and faced third place Grand Rapids in the first round, while second place South Bend played fourth place Kalamazoo.

In the first series, Grand Rapids won Game 1, after pitcher Eleanor Moore singled home the winning run in the bottom of the ninth inning for an 8–7 victory. The Daisies were facing elimination in Game 2, but Grand Rapids forfeited the game as well as the next to give Fort Wayne the first round. When the league allowed Rockford's catcher Ruth Richard to play for the Daisies, the Grand Rapids players voted not to play. Richard was a last-minute replacement for Rita Briggs, who was sidelined after suffering a broken wrist. The dispute got so heated that managers Allington and English fought about it at home plate before the game. Risinger started Game 1, allowing three runs in seven innings, but did not have a decision.

In the other series, Kalamazoo lost Game 1 to South Bend before rebounding and taking the next two games. In the finals, the Lassies defeated the Daisies three to two games. First base-pitcher June Peppas starred for Kalamazoo, winning her two starts while hitting 6-for-15 with two home runs and three RBI, during what turned out to be the AAGPBL's final season.

Risinger posted a 73–80 record with 581 strikeouts and a 2.51 ERA in 187 career games. A .172 hitter (80-for-406), she batted four doubles and one triple without home runs.

== Life after baseball ==
During her early years in the league, Risinger had moved from her hometown to live and work in Grand Rapids, Michigan. She continued living in Grand Rapids, where she kept busy helping to prepare for real estate sales. For almost forty years she worked professionally and on a volunteer basis with the Shriners.

Asked what was the best thing about playing professional baseball, Risinger replied, Doing what you loved and getting paid for it. When I say baseball did everything for me, it's true. Possibly I would still be in Hess, Oklahoma, which isn't a bad place to live if you have a profession and can drive some place to work. At that time, I had nothing, and now I feel satisfied with my life, and I am a very happy person. The last few years of her life she spent her winters with family in Oklahoma, where she died at the age of 81.

Since 1988 she is part of Women in Baseball, a permanent display based at the Baseball Hall of Fame and Museum in Cooperstown, New York, which was unveiled to honor the entire All-American Girls Professional Baseball League.

== Pitching statistics ==
GP	W	L	W-L%	ERA	IP	H	R	ER	BB	SO	WHIP
187	73	80	.477	2.51	1347	1073	524	379	599	578	1.241
