= Georgette Vincent =

- Pitcher
- Born: July 5, 1928; Fall River, Massachusetts, U.S.
- Died: December 4, 1980 (aged 52); South Bend, Indiana, U.S.
- Batted: Right Threw: Right

Teams
- Racine Belles (1947–1948); South Bend Blue Sox (1949–1952, 1954)

Career highlights and awards
- Two championship teams (1951–1952)

Georgette Vincent [Mooney] (July 5, 1928 – December 4, 1980) was a pitcher who played in the All-American Girls Professional Baseball League between the 1947 and 1954 seasons. Listed at 5 ft 3 in (1.60 m), 130 lb., Vincent batted and threw right-handed. She was born in Fall River, Massachusetts.

A member of two champion teams, Georgette Vincent pitched as a reliever and spot starter during her seven seasons in the league. After being used sparingly by the Racine Belles for two seasons, she received better opportunities to achieve her potential with the South Bend Blue Sox.

Vincent began with the Belles in 1948, appearing in just four games. The next year she posted a 3–5 record and a 3.66 earned run average in 15 games, while laboring through 59 innings. Then she was assigned to South Bend.

She went 3–2 with a 3.50 ERA for the Sox in 1949, working 36 innings in 11 relief appearances. She had a few chances to pitch, due in part to the South Bend's strong pitching rotation headed by Jean Faut, Lillian Faralla, Josephine Hasham and Ruth Williams.

During the 1950 season Vincent often started the second game of South Bend's several doubleheaders, which included a 1–0, four-hit shutout against the Peoria Redwings, and a five-hit complete game with eight strikeouts in a 9–2 victory over the Kalamazoo Lassies. She finished the year with an 8–12 record and a 3.12 ERA in 153 innings of work.

Her most productive season came in 1951, when she helped South Bend win the pennant and the championship title with a 13–9 record and a 2.42 ERA in a career-high 171 innings. She also set a personal mark with 113 strikeouts, which also was the fifth best of the season. During the best-of-five final round against the Rockford Peaches, Vincent started Game 4 with her team against the wall, 2-to-1. She prevailed in a pitching duel with Helen Fox, giving the Blue Sox a 6–3 victory to tie up the series. Then South Bend routed the Peaches in the final game, 10–2, to make one of the most remarkable comebacks in postseason history after being down two games to none.

In 1952, Vincent was 8–8 with a career-best 2.36 ERA and South Bend claimed its second consecutive title in identical ways, 3–2, over the Rockford Peaches. She had to play at second base when her team went into the playoffs with only 12 players in the roster due to a late-season walk-off.

״Jette״, as teammates nicknamed her, missed the 1953 season after being married. She played her last season in the league under the name of Georgette Mooney.

She is part of Women in Baseball, a permanent display based at the Baseball Hall of Fame and Museum in Cooperstown, New York, which was unveiled in 1988 to honor the entire All-American Girls Professional Baseball League.

== Career statistics ==
Pitching

GP	W	L	W-L%	ERA	IP	H	RA	ER	BB	SO	HBP	WP	WHIP
97	38	34	.527	2.88	600	457	276	192	374	294	20	27	1.39

Batting

GP	AB	R	H	2B	3B	HR	RBI	SB	BB	SO	BA	OBP
152	294	35	45	3	3	0	22	21	36	33	.153	.245

Fielding

GP	PO	A	E	TC	DP	FA
97	51	185	17	253	1	.933
