= Betty Wanless =

- Third base
- Born: August 28, 1928; Springfield, Illinois, U.S.
- Died: December 20, 1995 (aged 67); Kalkaska, Michigan, U.S.
- Batted: Right Threw: Right

Teams
- Grand Rapids Chicks (1953); South Bend Blue Sox (1954)

Career highlights and awards
- AAGPBL champion (1953)

Betty Wanless [Decker] (August 28, 1928 – December 20, 1995) was an infielder who played from 1953 through 1954 in the All-American Girls Professional Baseball League (AAGPBL). Listed at 5 ft 5 in (1.65 m), 134 lb, Wanless batted and threw right-handed. She was born in Springfield, Illinois.

Betty Wanless played in the rival National Girls Baseball League of Chicago before joining the AAGPBL during its last two seasons. A strong defender at third base with a combination of power and speed, Wanless belted 18 home runs and stole 74 bases in a career 171 games. Nicknamed ״Duke״ by her teammates, she reportedly hit the longest home run ever recorded at the old Grand Rapids ballpark, which was estimated at 425 feet.

Wanless entered the league in 1953 with the Grand Rapids Chicks, to form part of a solid infield that included Inez Voyce at first base, Eleanor Moore or Alma Ziegler at second, and Marilyn Olinger at shortstop. Wanless batted a .248 average with a .309 on-base percentage and a .291 of slugging, driving in 35 runs and scoring 49 times, while her 48 stolen bases ranked for the tenth best in the league. She also led the circuit in fielding average at her position with a .924 mark. Grand Rapids, managed by Woody English, won the regular title and claimed the championship, though she did not play in the postseason.

Wanless was sent to the South Bend Blue Sox before the 1954 season. She was used as the leadoff hitter by manager Karl Winsch, and she responded with a BA/OBP/SLG line of .274/.334/.467, placing tenth in total bases (150). She also tied for third in doubles (14), and for fifth in runs (75) and stolen bases (26) while hitting 18 homers, two of them grand slams. South Bend advanced to the playoffs, only to be beaten in the best-of-three first round by the Kalamazoo Lassies. Wanless hit .286 (4-for-14) with two home runs, three RBI and four runs in a lost cause.

Following her baseball career, she married Daniel George Decker. She is part of Women in Baseball, a permanent display based at the Baseball Hall of Fame and Museum in Cooperstown, New York, which was unveiled in 1988 to honor the entire All-American Girls Professional Baseball League.

Betty died in 1995 in Kalkaska, Michigan, at the age of 67. She is buried at Saint Mary of the Woods Catholic Cemetery in Kalkaska County.

== Career statistics ==
Batting

GP	AB	R	H	2B	3B	HR	RBI	SB	TB	BB	SO	BA	OBP	SLG
171	627	124	164	23	3	18	82	74	247	56	71	.262	.322	.394

Fielding

GP	PO	A	E	TC	DP	FA
170	207	360	69	636	22	.892
