= Janet Rumsey =

American baseball player (1931–2008)

- Pitcher
- Born: October 16, 1931; Moores Hill, Indiana, U.S.
- Died: May 12, 2008 (aged 76); Columbus, Indiana, U.S.
- Batted: Right Threw: Right

Teams
- South Bend Blue Sox (1951); Battle Creek Belles (1951); South Bend Blue Sox (1951–1954)

Career highlights and awards
- All-Star Team (1954); Two-time Championship Team (1951–1952); Single season leader in earned run average, winning percentage, complete games (1954); Pitched a no-hitter (1954)

Janet Jeree Rumsey (October 16, 1931 – May 12, 2008) was a pitcher who played from 1951 through 1954 in the All-American Girls Professional Baseball League (AAGPBL). Listed at 5 ft 8 in (1.73 m), 135 lb., she batted and threw right-handed.

An All-Star pitcher, Janet Rumsey was a member of two champion teams of the All-American Girls Professional Baseball League during the final four years of its existence. She posted a 39–43 career record and a 2.33 earned run average in 105 pitching appearances, and has the distinction of hurling the last no-hitter in the league's history, while leading in several pitching categories in its last ever season.

Born in Moores Hill, Indiana, Janet was one of four children in the family of Lawrence L. and Mabel M. (Maffey) Rumsey. She was a 1949 graduate of Burney High School, and credited her father for introducing her into baseball. I used to play catch with my father. He'd hit fungoes to me, she explained in an interview. In school the girls did not have a softball team, but she was allowed to play on a boys' baseball team in junior high.

In 1950, Rumsey saw a short film on the Fort Wayne Daisies AAGPBL team and decided to send them a letter. After that, she was invited to a tryout, but she did not make the grade. A year later, she tried again and received a new chance with the South Bend Blue Sox. She tried out at first base and the outfield, but South Bend manager Karl Winsch saw that she a strong arm and turned her into a pitcher.

Rumsey entered the league in 1951 with South Bend, as part of a pitching staff that included Jean Faut, Lillian Faralla, Dorothy Mueller and Louise Arnold. During the midseason, she was loaned to the ill-fated Battle Creek Belles, as the AAGPBL shifted players as needed to help some teams stay afloat. Nevertheless, she rejoined the Blue Sox late in the year in time to help the team in the playoffs. She finished the year with a combined 4–8 mark and a 2.52 ERA, while pitching as a reliever in the final series. South Bend clinched the league title and the final playoffs.

In 1952 Rumsey improved to 9–10 with a 2.33 ERA, leading her team with 26 games pitched. Second place South Bend defeated fourth place Grand Rapids Chicks in the first round of the playoffs, two games to one, advancing to the best-of-final series to face the Rockford Peaches. Rumsey started Game 4 of the series with her team against the wall, 2-to-1. She hurled a complete game, allowing the Peaches one unearned run while defeating Rose Gacioch in a 10-inning pitching duel, by a score of 2–1. In decisive Game 5, Jean Faut drove in two runs and held the Peaches to three runs to clinch the series.

South Bend went through a poor season in 1953 and Rumsey suffered with the team, posting an 11–19 mark and a 2.42 ERA, though she finished second in the league in innings pitched (249), third in shutouts (4) and seventh in strikeouts (86).

Rumsey and the Blue Sox returned in 1954 for what turned out to be the league's final season. As the circuit moved to a smaller, livelier baseball and increased the length of the basepaths, the hitters gradually developed an advantage. Joanne Weaver of the Fort Wayne Daisies batted a remarkable .429 average and 29 home runs to set AAGPBL all-time records in a single season. Her teammate Jean Geissinger hit .377 with 26 home runs and a league-high 91 runs batted in, while Betty Foss, another Fort Wayne slugger, hit .352 with 14 homers and 54 RBI.

By then, Rumsey had perfected a sidearm curveball, a sinker and a heavy fastball. This arsenal of pitches led to her selection to the league's last All-Star team. In spite of pitching in a hitters' year, she posted a 15–6 record with a 2.16 ERA and 89 strikeouts in 169 innings of work, including five shutouts. Rumsey also led the league in ERA, finished second to Fort Wayne's Maxine Kline in wins, shutouts and innings pitched (18, 6 and 181), was third in winning percentage (.750), while tying with Grand Rapids' Eleanor Moore for the most complete games (21). In addition, she hurled the last no-hitter in the league's history. On August 24 she had a perfect game against Grand Rapids, until she walked a batter. The next batter got a ball through the infield, but the runner was forced at second (base) to preserve the no-hitter, she recalled. The season ended and the league folded shortly after the game.

Following her baseball career, Rumsey worked in accounting at Cummins Engine Company from 1955 to 1985. Following her retirement, she continued her activity by playing golf and tennis.

Since 1988 Rumsey is part of Women in Baseball, a permanent display based at the Baseball Hall of Fame and Museum in Cooperstown, New York, which was unveiled to honor the entire All-American Girls Professional Baseball League rather than individual baseball personalities.

Rumsey, who never married, was a longtime resident of Columbus, Indiana, where she died at the age of 76.

== Career statistics ==
Pitching

GP	W	L	W-L%	ERA	IP	H	RA	ER	BB	SO	HBP	WP	WHIP
105	39	43	.476	2.33	551	375	242	158	262	259	9	21	1.20

Batting

GP	AB	R	H	2B	3B	HR	RBI	SB	TB	BB	SO	BA	OBP	SLG
115	243	16	41	3	0	0	13	1	44	20	47	.169	.232	.181

Fielding

GP	PO	A	E	TC	DP	FA
115	60	294	21	375	3	.944
