= Dorothy Naum =

- Catcher / Infielder / Pitcher
- Born: January 5, 1928; Dearborn, Michigan, U.S.
- Died: September 23, 2008 (aged 80); Galesburg, Illinois, U.S.
- Batted: Right Threw: Right

Teams
- South Bend Blue Sox (1946); Kenosha Comets (1947–1951); Kalamazoo Lassies (1952–1953)

Career highlights and awards
- Single season leader in earned run average (1951)

Dorothy Mary Naum (later Parker; January 5, 1928 – September 23, 2008) was an American catcher, infielder and pitcher who played from 1946 through 1953 in the All-American Girls Professional Baseball League (AAGPBL). Listed at 5 ft 4 in (1.63 m), 112 lb, she batted and threw right-handed.

== Baseball career ==
Dorothy Naum played many different positions during her eight seasons in the league. Originally a catcher, she later was moved to the middle infield positions before emerging as a solid starting pitcher. Though her fastball was fairly tepid, she had good control of her curveball and changeup. She led all pitchers for the best earned run average in 1951, and helped her team reach the postseason in 1953. Overall, she posted a 27–19 record in four seasons, while her 2.01 ERA is one of the lowest in league's history.

== Biography ==
Born in Dearborn, Michigan, Dorothy was the daughter of James and Mary. She learned fundamentals of baseball from her two brothers at an early age, but did not begin playing softball until she was a 12-year-old young girl. At 18, her team's coach advised her to try out as a catcher, because the league did not have enough good ones. Nevertheless, Naum admittedly was not strong enough to be a good hitter.

She entered the All-American Girls Professional Baseball League in 1946 with the South Bend Blue Sox, playing for them one year before joining the Kenosha Comets (1947–1951) and Kalamazoo Lassies (1952–1953). In her first four seasons, Naum had modest hitting numbers, by compiling averages of .194 (1946), .207 (1947), .174 (1948) and .157 (1949).

Then in 1950 with Kenosha, Naum was used periodically as a pitcher, which earned her a spot in the rotation. She responded with a 6–4 record and a 2.39 ERA in 19 games. She had an even better season for the Comets in 1951, when she was 5–4 and led the league with a 1.14 ERA.

In 1953, Naum topped the Kalamazoo staff with a 14–7 record, while her 2.18 ERA was surpassed only by her teammate Gloria Cordes (1.98), helping Kalamazoo reach the postseason to face the Fort Wayne Daisies in a best-of-three series. Following a twelve-inning 3–1 defeat to Maxine Kline and the Daisies in Game 1, Naum was selected to start Game 2. Going in the ninth inning, the Lassies were down 1–0 in their last at bat. Naum stepped up to the plate and helped herself after hitting a home run over the fence to tie the game at 1–1. It was the first and last home run Naum hit in 1628 career AAGPBL at bats, including the postseason. She then set down Fort Wayne in the bottom of the ninth to force the extra innings. In the top of 10th inning, Jean Lovell singled in the winning run in the 10th, Naum retired the side in the bottom and was credited with a 2–1 victory in a complete 10-inning game. In Game 3, Kalamazoo won over Fort Wayne, 5–3, behind strong pitching from Kay Blumetta and two RBI from Lovell, and advanced to the best-of-three final series. Finally, Kalamazoo was defeated in two games by the Grand Rapids Chicks.

Following the 1953 season, Naum married Ron Parker, who was going to allow her to play the final season of the league, but she became pregnant with her first child instead. The couple had two sons, Craig and Robert, and two granddaughters. Ron died in 1995, after 42 years of marriage.

A resident of Galesburg, Illinois since 1958, Dorothy Naum Parker was a member of the All-American Girls Professional Baseball League, which was honored with a permanent display unveiled at the Baseball Hall of Fame and Museum in Cooperstown, New York in October 1988.

In her spare time, Dorothy was an avid golfer . She participated in several Galesburg All-City Championships, while her other hobbies included bowling, contract bridge, knitting, needlepoint and watching sports, especially the National Basketball Association games. She also was a member of the Greek Orthodox Church.

She died in 2008 at the age of 80.

== Career statistics ==
Batting

GP	AB	R	H	2B	3B	HR	RBI	SB	TB	BB	SO	BA	OBP	SLG
578	1620	184	293	18	3	0	72	127	317	225	93	.181	.280	.196

Pitching

GP	W	L	W-L%	ERA	IP	H	RA	ER	BB	SO	HB	WP	WHIP	SO/BB
64	27	19	.587	2.01	439	274	155	98	149	160	12	10	0.96	1.07

Collective fielding

GP	PO	A	E	TC	DP	FA
642	162	808	118	1045	75	.928
