= Gloria Schweigerdt =

American baseball player

- Pitcher
- Born: June 10, 1934; Chicago, Illinois, U.S.
- Died: July 10, 2014 (aged 80); Wauconda, Illinois, U.S.
- Batted: Right Threw: Right

Teams
- Chicago Colleens (1950); Grand Rapids Chicks (1951); Battle Creek Belles (1951–1952)

Gloria June "Tippy" Schweigerdt (June 10, 1934 – July 10, 2014) was an American pitcher who played from 1950 through 1952 in the All-American Girls Professional Baseball League (AAGPBL). Listed at 5 ft 4 in (1.63 m), 120 lb, she batted and threw right-handed.

Born in Chicago, to Emily (née Hardt) and Gottlieb Schweigerdt, Gloria Schweigerdt started playing sandlot ball with her brother and the boys of her neighborhood at age seven. When she turned fifteen, she went to a league tryout held at Thillens Stadium in Skokie. In 1950, she was assigned to the Chicago Colleens/Springfield Sallies rookie touring teams. She traveled all over the country and posted an 8–7 record while pitching for the Colleens. During the trip, she hurled a no-hitter at the old Yankee Stadium. "No other woman had ever pitched off that mound before me", she recalled in an interview.

Schweigerdt was promoted to the Grand Rapids Chicks in the 1951 season and ended up pitching for the Battle Creek Belles during the midseason. In all, Schweigerdt went 3–4 with a 2.72 earned run average in 14 games.

She recalled winning a pitching duel against Jean Faut of the South Bend Blue Sox in the course of the year. She had her best statistical season in 1952 with Battle Creek, when she compiled a 10–10 record and a 2.95 ERA. She also set personal bests in strikeouts (44) and innings (180), while tying for fourth in the league for the most games pitched (28).

== Personal life ==
She did not return to the league after marrying in 1953. After divorcing her husband, she raised two children, Gordon and Gloria, while working as a meat cutter for a long time before retiring in 1996.

== Last years/death ==
Gloria Schweigerdt lived in Arlington Heights, a suburb of Chicago, and attended AAGPBL Players Association reunions. The association was largely responsible for the opening of Women in Baseball, a permanent display based at the Baseball Hall of Fame and Museum in Cooperstown, New York, which was unveiled in 1988 to honor the entire All-American Girls Professional Baseball League. She died in 2014 in Wauconda, Illinois, at the age of 80.

== Career statistics ==
Pitching

GP	W	L	W-L%	ERA	IP	H	RA	ER	BB	SO	HBP	WP	WHIP
42	13	14	.481	2.88	256	230	114	82	95	80	10	1	1.27

Batting

GP	AB	R	H	2B	3B	HR	RBI	SB	BB	SO	BA	OBP	SLG
44	87	6	11	3	0	0	6	1	3	23	.126	.156	.161

Fielding

GP	PO	A	E	TC	DP	FA
42	12	71	6	29	0	.913
