= Alma Ziegler =

- Second base / Pitcher
- Born: January 9, 1918; Chicago, Illinois, U.S.
- Died: May 30, 2005 (aged 87); Los Osos, California, U.S.
- Batted: Right Threw: Right

debut
- 1944, for the Milwaukee Chicks

Last appearance
- 1954, for the Grand Rapids Chicks

Career statistics
- Batting average: .173
- Hits: 628
- Home runs: 3
- Runs batted in: 239
- Stolen bases: 387
- Win–loss record: 60–34
- Earned run average: 1.94
- Strikeouts: 250

Teams
- Milwaukee Chicks (1944); Grand Rapids Chicks (1945–1954)

Career highlights and awards
- 3× AAGPBL champion (1944, 1947, 1953); Player of the Year Award (1950); 4× All-Star Team (1950, 1952–1954); Pitcher of the Year (1950)

Alma Ziegler (January 9, 1918 – May 30, 2005) was an infielder and pitcher who played from 1944 through 1954 in the All-American Girls Professional Baseball League (AAGPBL). Listed at 5 ft 3 in (1.60 m), 125 lb., Ziegler batted and threw right-handed.

Alma Ziegler was one of the best all-around players in the early years of the All-American Girls Professional Baseball League. Noted for her enthusiastic, high-spirited personality and great knowledge of the game, Ziegler excelled at second base, where her range and acrobatic plays impressed baseball fanatics and experts. In addition, she later developed as a leading overhand pitcher. A member of three championship teams and three all-star squads, she spent 11 years in the circuit, being named to the Player of the Year and Pitching Champion awards in the same season. Regarded as a disciplined hitter and a daring base runner, she posted a career 2.57 walk-to-strikeout ratio (641-to-249) and utilized her stunning speed to snatch 387 stolen bases. As a pitcher, she had a 42–21 record for a .667 percentage and collected a solid 1.32 earned run average.

== Early life ==
A native of Chicago, Illinois, the diminutive Ziegler was the daughter of Frank Ziegler and Mae (née Connal) Ziegler. At a very early age, she played baseball in Chicago. In 1933 her family had to relocate to Los Angeles, California, due to the economic depression. Her father had been a linotype operator in Chicago, but went into different work after moving to California, while her mother was a housewife and an avid bridge player. Ziegler had a brother, Frank, who was three years older than she.

At that time in California girls were not allowed to participate in interscholastic sports, except tennis. As expected, Ziegler expressed disappointment over very little organized women's school sports in her new home, but she recalled that various girls' athletic associations in the Los Angeles area provided compensation, as her hectic later teenage years involved memberships on several softball, basketball and speedball teams. In the late 1930s, she joined the Goodrich Silvertown, a prestigious softball club sponsored by B. F. Goodrich Company, one of the largest tire and rubber manufacturers in the world. In 1939 she helped her team win another Southern California Championship.

== Playing career ==
=== Milwaukee Chicks ===
By 1944 the AAGPBL added two teams, the Milwaukee Chicks and the Minneapolis Millerettes. Ziegler attended a tryout for the AAGPBL arranged by scout Bill Allington, who would join the league for the upcoming season as manager of the Rockford team. Ziegler was one of six girls from Los Angeles who traveled to Peru, Indiana for the tryout. The girls passed the test and were rewarded with a contract to play in the league. Ziegler joined the Chicks, along with Thelma Eisen, while Faye Dancer, Annabelle Lee, Lavonne Paire and Dorothy Wiltse were allocated to the Millerettes.

In 1944 Ziegler played second base for the debuting Milwaukee Chicks, a well-balanced squad managed by Max Carey that counted such talented players as Josephine Kabick, Merle Keagle and Connie Wisniewski. Ziegler hit a modest .191 average in 115 games, including 51 runs and 25 RBI, but she established herself as a flashy defender who made outstanding plays routinely. The Chicks led the league in runs scored (492), batting average (.207), stolen bases (739) and tied for first in home runs (12). The best offensive support came from Keagle, who hit .264 with 47 runs batted in, and led the AAGPBL hitters with seven home runs and 145 total bases. The one-two pitching staff was led by Kabick, who posted a 26–19 record for a .578 winning percentage and topped the league in wins and innings pitched (366), while Wisniewski went 23–10 (.697) with a 2.23 earned run average.

The Chicks went 30–26 in the first half of the year, but dominated the second half (40–19) and had the best overall record (70–45). They then went on to win the Championship Title, beating the Kenosha Comets in the postseason. During the seven-game series Wisniewski went 4–1 with a 0.40 ERA in five complete games, including two shutouts, two one-run games and one two-run game, winning three of four matchups with Kenosha's Helen Nicol, who finished with a 17–11 mark (.607) and had led the league with a minuscule 0.93 ERA. Although the Chicks won the championship, they had no local financial backing and could not compete with the American Association Milwaukee Brewers. In fact, the Chicks were forced to play all seven games of the series at Kenosha's Lake Front Stadium because the Brewers were using the Borchert Field in Milwaukee. In addition, the high ticket prices charged for AAGPBL games failed to encourage significant fan support. Due to lack of community support and skepticism of journalists, the Chicks moved to Grand Rapids, Michigan prior to the 1945 season.

=== Grand Rapids Chicks ===
From 1945 to 1954 Ziegler played with the Grand Rapids Chicks. Although originally nicknamed Gabby by her teammates, she eventually was called Ziggy by the Grand Rapids crowds. Her leadership was indisputable since other Chicks players considered her playing style somewhat inspirational, which led her to be named captain of the team. In 1945 the Chicks finished in third place (60–50) and lost the first round of the playoffs to Rockford, three to one games. The Chicks improved to second in 1946 (71–41), but were defeated again by Rockford in the first round, this time in five games. Eventually, Grand Rapids fanatics honored Ziegler in an event named A Night for Ziggy.

The big adventure of 1947, recalled fondly by many players, was a spring training trip to Cuba. The AAGPBL flew 150 young women from eight clubs to Havana, where they trained, played eight days of exhibitions, and were cheered by more than 75,000 fans. The Chicks, now managed by Johnny Rawlings, ended in second place (65–47) and secured their return to the playoffs. In the first round, Grand Rapids disposed of South Bend in five games and later won the championship title, with Mildred Earp throwing a 1–0 shutout against Racine in decisive game seven. In the 1947 Grand Rapids Chicks yearbook, Ziegler is described as the spark plug of the team.

In 1948 Ziegler posted career-numbers in games played (126), runs scored (61), hits (77), and runs batted in (33). In addition, she led second baggers in fielding percentage, led the league in walks (62), and compiled a 9–6 pitching record, helping Grand Rapids clinch the Eastern Division with a 77–47 mark. The Chicks beat South Bend in the first round of the playoffs, three to two games, but were swept in three games by the expansion Fort Wayne Daisies in the semifinal series.

Ziegler played strongly in 1949, winning the fielding title for the second consecutive year while hitting .181 with 67 hits and scoring 58 runs. The Chicks finished in third place (57–54), beat Fort Wayne in the first round three to two games, but lost the semifinals to Rockford three to one games. Once more, the leadership qualities of Ziegler were recognized by her Chicks teammates. But her most productive season came in 1950, considering that most pitchers were still adjusting to the new 10-inch ball introduced the previous year. That season she posted a pitching record of 19–7 with a solid 1.38 ERA, leading all pitchers in winning percentage (.732). She also tossed 43 straight shutout innings, and finished second in ERA behind the stellar South Bend hurler Jean Faut (1.12), who won the Pitcher of the Year Award after going 21–9 (.700 W%). The Chicks finished fourth with a 59–53 record and advanced to the playoffs, but lost to Fort Wayne in the first round, three to two games. For her heroics, Ziegler was named AAGPBL Player of the Year and joined the All-Star Team.

In 1951 Ziegler continued her torrid pitching, ending with a 14–8 (.636) record and topping the league with a 1.26 ERA. She narrowly surpassed Faut, who finished 15–7 (.682) with a 1.33 ERA. As an added bonus, Ziegler hit .191 with 51 runs and a career-high 35 RBI in 115 games and served as the interim manager for the Chicks late in the season. Her team won the first half (40–13) and finished fourth in the second half (31–22), to collect the second-best overall record (71–35) and a ticket to the playoffs, but was swept by South Bend during the first round in just two games.

For the next two years Ziegler was plagued by nagging injuries, which slowed her production and development. In 1952, she hit .197 with 20 runs and 16 RBI in a career-low 85 games, and earned her second All-Star berth. The Chicks finished fourth (50–60) and lost to South Bend in the first round of the playoffs in only two games.

=== AAGPBL title ===
The Chicks clinched the AAGPBL title in 1953, led by the strong pitching of Eleanor Moore, who won 17 games to tie Faut for the league lead. Ziegler, who moved to shortstop, contributed with a .168 average in 96 games and made the All-Star Team again. Grand Rapids, with Woody English at the helm, finished second in the regular season (62–44) and faced Rockford in the first round of the playoffs in a best-of-three series.

In Game 1 of the playoffs, Rockford scored early and defeated the visiting Chicks, 9–2. The Peaches lined 13 hits off pitchers Eleanor Moore and Mary Lou Studnicka.

The action shifted to Grand Rapids home ballpark for Game 2, and Earlene Risinger silenced the Peaches' bats to just two measly hits en route to a complete game, 2–0 shutout. Her clutch performance was backed by timely hitting by Ziegler, who hit an RBI single in the seventh inning to give her a 1–0 lead, and Dolores Moore, who drove in the game's final run with a sacrifice fly in the eighth.

In Game 3, Grand Rapids starter Dorothy Mueller pitched well enough to beat Rockford, 4–3, and the Chicks advanced to the Championship Series to face the Kalamazoo Lassies, managed by Mitch Skupien, who had eliminated Fort Wayne in the other playoff contention.

In the final series, Grand Rapids swept Kalamazoo in the best of three game set, by the scores of 5–2 and 4–1. In Game 1, Studnicka started for Grand Rapids and allowed only two runs in eight innings of work. With the score tied 2–2 going into the fourth inning, the Chicks scored three runs off Lassies’ pitcher Gloria Cordes. With the bases loaded, Ziegler drove home one run with a sacrifice fly to put the score in favor of Grand Rapids, 3–2. Another sacrifice fly by Inez Voyce and an RBI single by Joyce Ricketts extended the lead to 5–2. When the Lassies' first two batters reached base in the final inning, manager English brought Eleanor Moore to the rescue. She promptly retired the next three batters in order, striking out Isabel Alvarez, retiring Dorothy Schroeder with a pop fly to shortstop Ziegler, and inducing June Peppas on a sharp grounder to the mound throwing to Voyce at first base for the final out of the game.

=== Later career ===
Ziegler and the Chicks returned in 1954 for what turned out to be the league's final season. She raised her average to .200 (43-for-215) and scored 33 runs with 21 RBI in 86 games. For the fourth time she was selected at second base for the All-Star Team. The Chicks finished in third place (46–45) and advanced to the playoffs to face regular-season champ Fort Wayne (54–40). But a dispute erupted before the two teams had played the opening game at Grand Rapids ballpark. After tempers calmed, the entire Fort Wayne team voted not to play, so the Chicks forfeited, allowing Fort Wayne to advance to the championship round. In the end, the Kalamazoo Lassies won the last AAGPBL Championship Series by defeating the Daisies three to two games.

First in Milwaukee, and later in Grand Rapids, the Chicks made the playoffs every year of their existence. Ziegler was the only player to be on the team during the entirety of its eleven-year history.

== Personal life ==
Following her baseball career, Ziegler went back to California and worked as a court reporter. Ziegler, who never married, had two nieces and two great-nieces. After retiring she became an avid golfer, was devoted to her family and her cats, and helped out the elderly as an active participant in the Meals on Wheels program.

Alma Ziegler was a longtime resident of Los Osos, California, where she died at the age of 87.

== Statistics ==
Batting

GP	AB	R	H	2B	3B	HR	RBI	SB	TB	BB	SO	BA	OBP	SLG
1154	3621	482	628	47	8	3	239	383	700	641	249	.173	.298	.193

Pitching

GP	W	L	W-L%	ERA	IP	H	RA	ER	BB	SO	WHIP	SO/BB
126	60	34	.638	1.94	839	677	250	181	203	250	1.05	1.23

Fielding

GP	PO	A	E	TC	DP	FA
954	2731	1977	245	4953	306	.927
