= Pat Scott =

Baseball player (1929–2016)

Patricia Scott
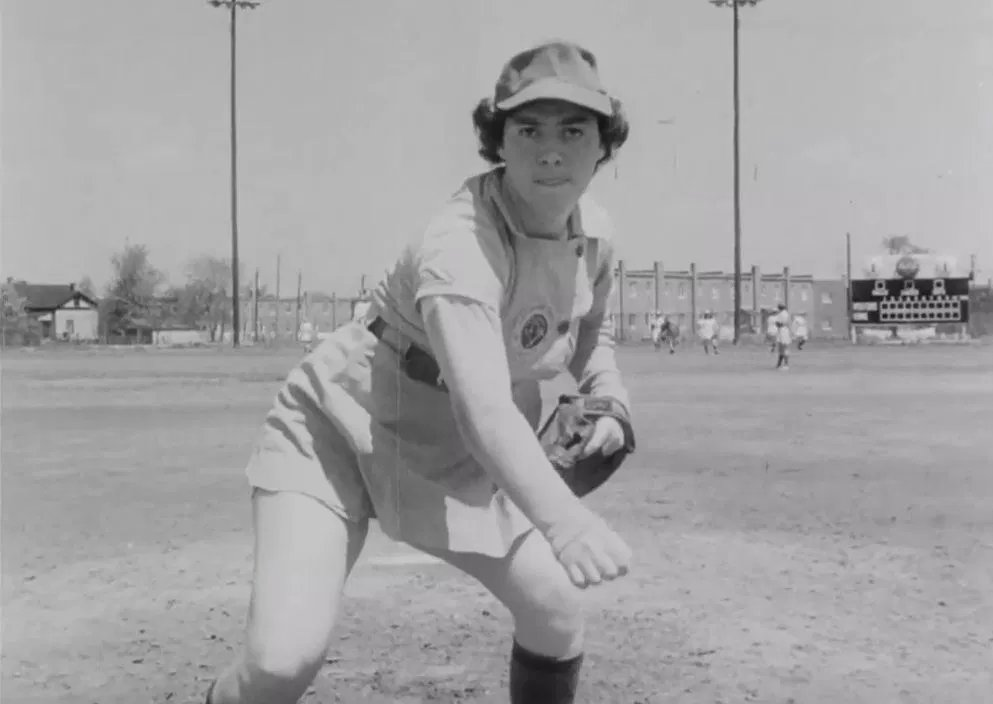
- Scott from a Universal newsreel in 1951
- Pitcher
- Born: July 14, 1929; Covington, Kentucky, U.S.
- Died: October 19, 2016 (aged 87); Erlanger, Kentucky, U.S.
- Batted: Right Threw: Right

Teams
- Springfield Sallies (1948); Fort Wayne Daisies (1951–1953)

Patricia Scott (July 14, 1929 – October 19, 2016) was a pitcher who played in the All-American Girls Professional Baseball League for parts of four seasons spanning 1948–1953. Listed at 5 ft 7 in (1.70 m), 155 lb., she batted and threw right-handed.

A solid finesse pitcher, Scott had one of the best overhand deliveries during the last six years of the league. She guided the Fort Wayne Daisies to three consecutive pennants from 1951 to 1953, averaging 16 wins in each of them, while recording career best numbers in ERA (2.46), WHIP (0.87) and SO/BB (1.07).

Born in Covington, Kentucky, Scott was raised in a family farm located in the nearby town of Burlington. The farm included a baseball field, just like in the 1992 film Field of Dreams, where she began playing baseball when she was eight years old. "I used to throw a ball against the barn," she explained in an interview. "The only difference was that instead of corn, we grew tobacco around it," she added.

When the young Pat was not doing farm chores, she was practicing throwing. To her delight, a minor league baseball team came to practice on their ball field. "I was about ten at the time, so they let me practice with them, and they taught me everything I know about baseball," she recalled.

Scott later played fastpitch softball in Cincinnati, Ohio, during her tenure at high school. In 1948, her father read an advertisement in the local newspaper offering girls an opportunity to try out for the All-American Girls Professional Baseball League at Wrigley Field. "So we went to Chicago. Amazingly, I made the cut and signed a contract with the Springfield Sallies... I was so thrilled because my dream to play baseball was actually coming true!"

Scott hurled and won an 11-inning complete game in her rookie season, helping the Sallies to a victory by recording a pair of singles, a double and one home run. Manager Carson Bigbee was very pleased with her work. Unfortunately, her mother became seriously ill shortly after and she had to return home. It seemed her playing days were over. Then in 1951, league president Max Carey was in urgent need of pitching and located Scott in Springfield, Ohio. Carey, who also managed the Fort Wayne Daisies, talked her parents into letting her return to the league.

After two years of absence, Scott renewed her passion for baseball after joining the Fort Wayne team. She won 15 games against 7 losses and recorded a 2.13 ERA in 26 games, striking out 62 batters in 190 innings, while ending seventh in wins and tenth in winning percentage (.682). In addition, she won a one-run, pennant-winning game against the Rockford Peaches, which represented the first single season title in Daisies history. In the best-of-three-first round, she held the South Bend Blue Sox to a single run in Game 2 to tie the series at a game apiece. In decisive Game 3, she lost an 11-inning duel with Jean Faut by a narrow margin of 2–1.

But Scott was even better in 1952, when she posted a 17–7 record with 60 strikeouts and a 2.05 ERA in 26 appearances, ending seventh in innings of work (202) and eight in ERA, while tying for fourth in wins and in winning percentage (.708). First place Fort Wayne, now managed by Hall of Fame legend Jimmie Foxx, faced third place Rockford in the first round and lost two-to-one games. Scott played at outfield and went 0-for-3 in one game.

About her relation with Foxx, Scott confirmed that he had a drinking problem, but he never let it affect his managing on the field and was a true gentleman around the ladies. I never saw him miss a game and never cuss, she clarified. Scott dropped slightly in the 1953 season, but appeared among the top ten pitchers in six different categories. She went 16–12 with a 3.06 ERA, ranking third in games pitched (32), fourth in innings (238) and tenth in winning percentage (.571), while tying for third in wins and in complete games (24), and for fourth in shutouts (4). Fort Wayne, with Bill Allington at the helm, clinched his third consecutive title and played third place Kalamazoo Lassies in the first round, being beaten for the third year in a row with identical margin of 1–2. Scott went 0–1 with a 3.00 ERA in nine innings.

In 1954, Scott could not pass up an agricultural examination to attend college in Europe as a student exchange program participant. She then attained a zoology degree at the University of Kentucky, where she also played for the Kentucky Wildcats women's basketball team. After earning another degree in medicine, she worked as a medical technologist for the next 32 years in the Cincinnati area.

Following her retirement, Scott moved to Walton, Kentucky, where she stayed playing softball and developed an interest in oil painting. She also trained horses for thirteen years and was a dog trainer for three years. She also became a golfer and an artist.

Scott attended her first wood carving show in 1994, out of sheer curiosity. Then, she signed up for classes and seminars at the River Valley Wood Carver's Association offered. She created carousel horse heads, busts, ornaments and several decorative items. "I quickly learned that carving is a lot different from painting because wood isn't as forgiving as paint. It took me six months to carve out a simple figure! ... From the time I was a little kid, I've always had this fascination with birds. So I've started carving them."

Scott is part of Women in Baseball, a permanent display based at the Baseball Hall of Fame and Museum in Cooperstown, New York, which was unveiled in 1988 to honor the entire All-American Girls Professional Baseball League.

== Career statistics ==
Pitching

GP	W	L	W-L%	ERA	IP	H	RA	ER	BB	SO	WP	HBP	WHIP	H/9	BB/9	SO/9	SO/BB
84	48	26	.649	2.46	630	377	232	172	174	187	8	9	0.87	5.39	2.49	2.67	1.07

Batting

GP	AB	R	H	2B	3B	HR	RBI	SB	TB	BB	SO	BA	OBP	SLG
91	261	30	57	10	1	1	21	0	72	8	13	.218	2.42	.276

Fielding

GP	PO	A	E	TC	DP	FA
84	41	209	6	256	3	.977
