= Hobart Brown =

American sculptor (1934–2007)

Hobart Ray Brown
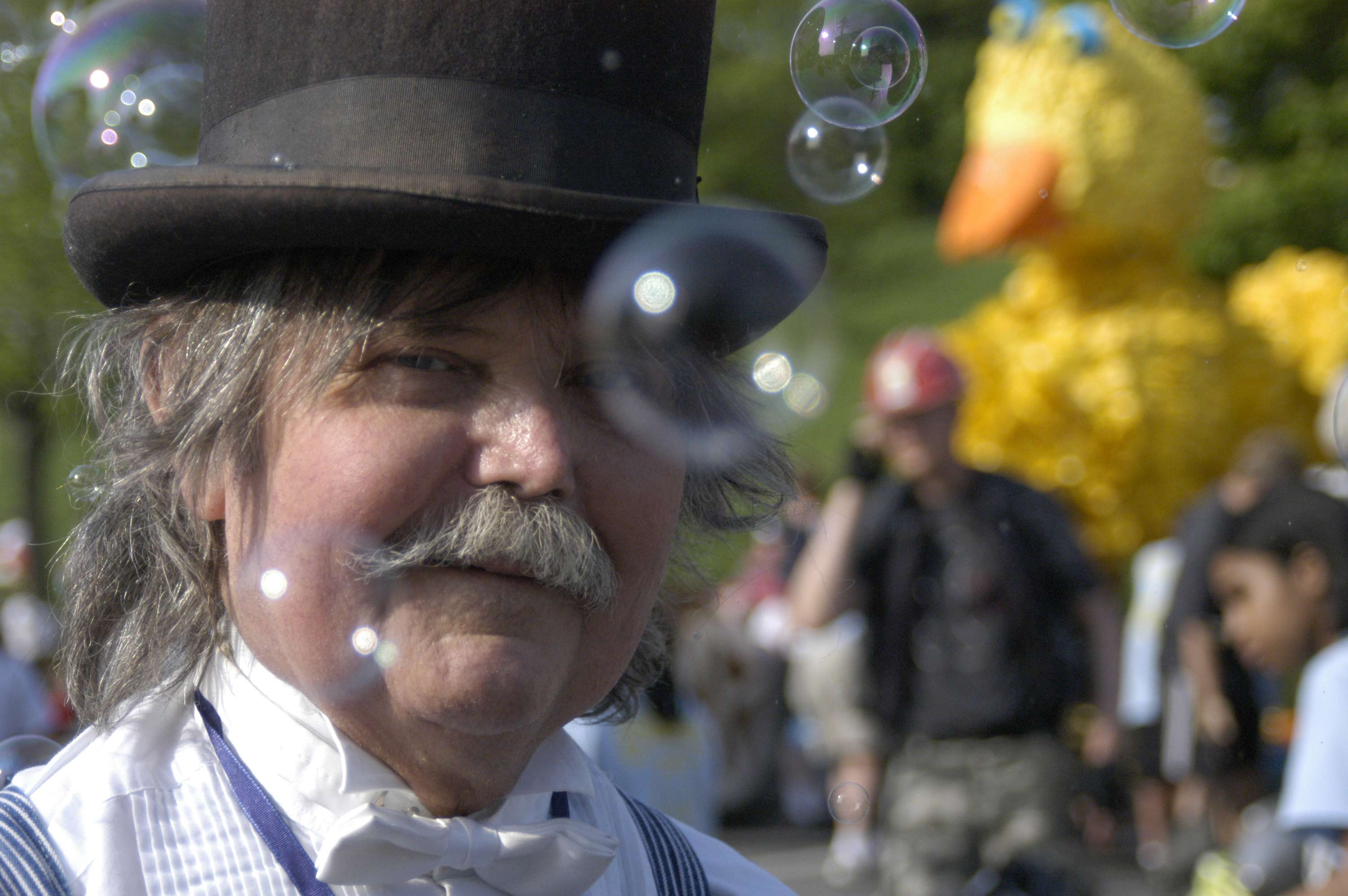
- Born: February 27, 1934; Hess, Oklahoma, US
- Died: November 7, 2007 (aged 73); Fortuna, California, US
- Occupation: sculptor
- Known for: founder of Kinetic Sculpture Racing

Hobart Ray Brown (February 27, 1934 – November 7, 2007) was an American sculptor and the founder of Kinetic Sculpture Racing.

== Early years ==
Hobart Brown was born in Hess, Oklahoma, to a fifteen-year-old mother who migrated across country to California on the back of her husband's motorcycle. He later described it as his classic Okie experience, mirroring the great migration captured in John Steinbeck's The Grapes of Wrath and other stories of the Dust Bowl years.

Brown went to high school in Los Angeles a couple of classes after Marilyn Monroe, whom he remembered by her real name and described as "a quiet, plain little thing – not at all what she became later."

== Adult life ==
After a stint as an airplane mechanic with the U.S. Army in Cambrai – Fritsh Kaserne Darmstadt, Germany, and time spent running hot rods with his friends on local empty roads, he become an artist in 1962 and moved to Humboldt County, California. Arriving with his wife and two sons, he opened the first of several Hobart Galleries; the first in Eureka, California, others in Trinidad and finally Ferndale, California.

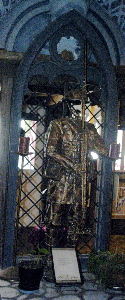
Face of War by Hobart Brown is the model for a proposed Australian War Memorial.

Over the years, the Hobart Galleries represented more than 150 local artists – launching several careers and providing exposure to younger artists by adding them to an established stable of better-known names.

Hobart had four children, three boys and one girl.

Hobart was instrumental in helping Morris Graves settle in his home in the hills outside Loleta, California.

During northern hemisphere winters until 2006, Hobart migrated to Australia, where he was first artist-in-residence at Happ's Winery, later at Leeuwin Wine Estates in Margaret River, Western Australia where his public welding studio was on their patio. His art was also displayed in the winery itself.

In 2006–07, Hobart was unable to travel to Australia due to his debility due to the advancement of his severe case of rheumatoid arthritis. Following several months of being in and out of treatment facilities, he suffered a stroke on May 17, 2007. He died of pneumonia in the Redwood Memorial Hospital in Fortuna California on November 7, 2007.

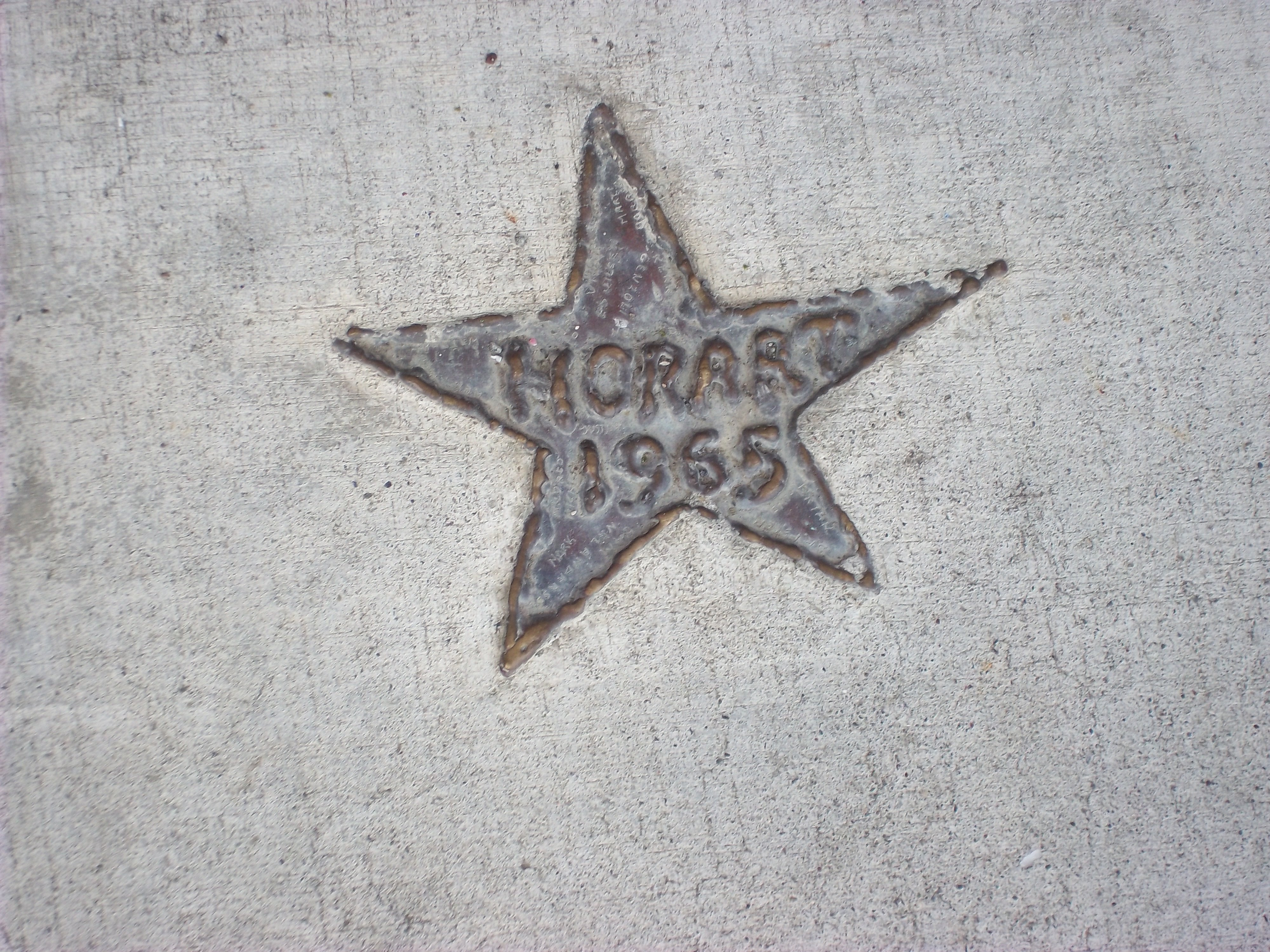
Hobart Brown Sidewalk Star

Hobart's gallery was sold in January, 2009 to local business owners.

=== Kinetic Sculpture Races ===
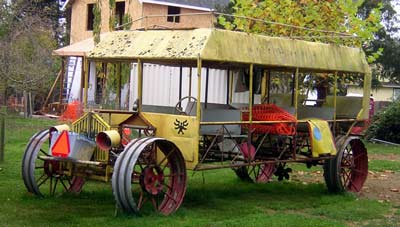
The Original People Powered Bus, Kinetic Sculpture

In 1969, Hobart started the Kinetic Sculpture Race, almost by accident when he modified his son's tricycle to a five-wheeled, decorated "Pentacycle" and another local artist and gallery owner, Jack Mays, challenged him to a race down Main Street on Mother's Day. Raceday came, so did ten other challengers. Neither Hobart nor Jack won the race, that honor went to Bob Brown (no relation) piloting his Kinetic Turtle. Hobart was acclaimed "the Glorious Founder" of the race.

The races continue as of 2025. The race is no longer just down the street but now is the longest human powered sculpture race in the world. The course covers approximately 42 miles of sand, water, pavement, hills, more water, roads and freeways from Arcata, California to Ferndale, California.

Hobart continued to sculpt and start other races. About ten Kinetic Races occur every year, from Baltimore to Western Australia, the spirit of "Adults having fun so children want to get older" infects individuals everywhere it lands.

His later years were spent battling a disfiguring and crippling rheumatoid arthritis. He continued his twice yearly peregrinations from north to south in search of the warmest, driest times of the year.

=== Exhibits, collectors and awards ===
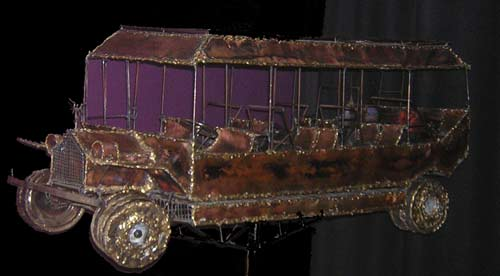
A sculpture of copper and brass on steel armature

A few of Hobart's many exhibits have included: White House and Smithsonian Museum, Washington, D.C.; the Ronald Reagan Museum, BC Gallery, Walnut Creek, CA; LA City Museum; Palm Springs Museum; Leeuwin Estates, Australia; and the Oscar Mayer Museum.

Hobart's collectors include President Ronald Reagan, Johnny Carson, Congressman Don Clausen, LA City Museum, U.S.S. Abraham Lincoln, Riverboat Casino Las Vegas, California Department of Transportation, the College of the Redwoods and more than 500 individuals and companies.

Hobart created the Republican Party Perpetual Trophy by commission from the Party.

Over the years, Hobart received many awards including listings in Who's Who Worldwide, being made an honorary Rotarian and annual proclamations from both the Eureka and Arcata City Councils.

Hobart was covered by media including:

- Television – ABC, CBS, CNN, Disney, NBC Today Show, Nickelodeon, Weird Houses and Weird Wheels, Game Show Network, and more.
- Movies – "It will Have Blinking Eyes" an award-winning documentary about the Kinetic Sculpture Race by China Blue films shown at the Sundance Film Festival.
- Print – National Geographic World, Popular Mechanics, San Francisco Chronicle, Smithsonian Magazine, The Times, Los Angeles Times, Chicago Sun-Times, The Age, Perth Australia Time, Times-Standard, Arcata Eye, North Coast Journal, Humboldt Independent and The Eureka Reporter.
- Radio – broadcaster for six years and many interviews.
- Publications
  - Kinetic Sculpture Racing, A Complete Guide: Founder Hobart Brown Tells All – a guide to Kinetic Sculpture Racing and its underlying philosophy. ISBN 1-879312-07-7
  - Author and co-author of numerous articles in newspapers and local journals.
- Quotations
  - "We're adults having fun so kids will want to get older."
  - "Money doesn't always bring happiness. People with ten million dollars are no happier than people with nine million dollars." from "The Peter Principle," by Laurence J. Peter.

== Photos and additional vita ==
- Hobart Brown – Virtual Gallery
