= Mary Lou Studnicka =

- Pitcher
- Born: July 19, 1931; Oak Lawn, Illinois, U.S.
- Died: November 21, 2014 (aged 83); Hot Springs Village, Arkansas, U.S.
- Batted: Right Threw: Right

Teams
- Grand Rapids Chicks (1951–1953)

Career highlights and awards
- Championship team (1953)

Mary Lou Studnicka (July 19, 1931 – November 21, 2014) was an American overhand pitcher who played from 1951 through 1953 in the All-American Girls Professional Baseball League (AAGPBL). Studnicka batted and threw right-handed. She was nicknamed "ML".

== Early life ==
Studnicka was born in Oak Lawn, Illinois, a suburb southwest of Chicago. She was the only girl of eight children born into the family of John and Marie Studnička [stood'-nicz-kuh], of Slovak ancestry. At an early age, she moved with her family to a farm in Palos Park, Illinois. She was interested in participating in baseball, thanks to her brothers, and she was never too young to follow in their footsteps.

While playing in a Chicago park with the boys' teams, Studnicka met a coach that developed players for the All-American Girls Professional Baseball League. After that, she spent six years in the Chicago farm club until receiving a letter and a contract telling her to report for spring training and the salary she would be getting. She returned the contract signed and attended the training camp.

At the age of 19, Studnicka joined the Grand Rapids Chicks for the 1951 season, as part of a pitching rotation that included Mildred Earp, Earlene Risinger and Connie Wisniewski. "The great ballplayer Rogers Hornsby encouraged me when I attended one of his baseball schools. I worked hard at learning the game because he believed I could do it," she recalled in an interview.

== AAGPBL career ==
In her rookie season, Studnicka won her first twelve starts before losing her first game. She finished with a 15–5 mark in 23 appearances, compiling a .750 winning percentage and 72 strikeouts. Grand Rapids reached the playoffs, but lost the first round to the Rockford Peaches. In 1952 she dropped to 11–12, while the Chicks advanced to the finals despite a losing season (50-60), only to be defeated by the South Bend Blue Sox and Jean Faut, who won Game 3 and decisive Game 5.

Studnicka went 12–13 in 1953, her last season in the league, and the Chicks enjoyed another trip to the playoffs.

=== 1953 AAGPBL Playoffs ===
==== First round ====
The Grand Rapids Chicks, with Woody English at the helm, faced their nemesis Rockford Peaches in the first round of the playoffs in a best-of-three series.

In Game 1, Rockford scored early and defeated the visiting Chicks, 9–2, to win the opener. Studnicka came from the bullpen for long relief in a lost cause.

The action shifted to Grand Rapids home ballpark for Game 2, and Earlene Risinger silenced the Peaches' bats to just two hits en route to a complete game, 2–0 shutout.

In Game 3, Grand Rapids starter Dorothy Mueller pitched well enough to beat Rockford, 4–3, and the Chicks advanced to the Championship Series to face the Kalamazoo Lassies, who defeated the Fort Wayne Daisies in the other first round series games.

==== Championship Series ====
In the final series, the Grand Rapids Chicks swept the Kalamazoo Lassies in the best of three game set, by the scores of 5–2 and 4–1.

In Game 1, Studnicka started for Grand Rapids and allowed only two runs in eight innings of work. With the score tied 2–2 going into the fourth inning, the Chicks scored three runs off Lassies’ pitcher Gloria Cordes. A tie-breaking sacrifice fly by Alma Ziegler scored Dolores Moore, and another RBI sacrifice fly by Inez Voyce put the Chicks up 4–2. An RBI single by Joyce Ricketts extended the lead to 5–2. When the Lassies' first two batters reached base in the final inning, manager English promptly brought in reliever Eleanor Moore, who retired the next three batters in order. She struck out Isabel Alvarez for the first out, retired Dorothy Schroeder with a pop fly to shortstop Ziegler, and beat June Peppas with a sharp grounder to second basewoman Dolores Moore who threw to Voyce at first base for the final out of the game. Studnicka was the winning pitcher and Cordes the loser, while Moore earned the save.

== Pitching statistics ==
GP	W	L	W-L%	ERA	IP	ER	BB	SO
78	38	30	.559	2.39	546	145	226	196

== Life after baseball ==
Following her baseball career, Studnicka married and had three daughters. She worked for a Chicago bank and began with the Chicago Police Department in 1962 as a fingerprint technician. When her husband died she married for the second time and moved to Arkansas, but was widowed again after 31 years of marriage to her second husband. Throughout her life, Studnicka was active in bowling, softball and golf.

== Sources ==
- Obituary
