= Hess, Oklahoma =

Unincorporated community in Jackson County, Oklahoma

Coordinates: 34°27′53″N 99°16′20″W

Hess is an unincorporated community in southeast Jackson County, in the U.S. state of Oklahoma. The community is approximately 4.5 miles east-southeast of Elmer and 14 miles west-northwest of Frederick in adjacent Tillman County. The Red River and the Texas border are four miles to the south.

== History ==
A post office called Hess was established in 1889, and remained in operation until 1920. Elvira P Hess, an early postmaster, gave the community her family name.

== Notable people ==
- Earlene Risinger, a pitcher in the All-American Girls Professional Baseball League, was born in Hess in 1927.
- Hobart Brown, American sculptor and founder of Kinetic Sculpture Racing, was born in Hess in 1934.
