= Marilyn Olinger =

- Shortstop
- Born: June 7, 1928; Sunbury, Ohio, U.S.
- Died: July 4, 2006 (aged 78); Columbus, Ohio, U.S.
- Batted: Right Threw: Right

Teams
- Chicago Colleens (1948); Grand Rapids Chicks (1948–1953)

Career highlights and awards
- Championship Team (1953)

Marilyn J. "Corky" Olinger (June 7, 1928 – July 4, 2006) was an American professional baseball shortstop who played from 1948 through 1953 in the All-American Girls Professional Baseball League (AAGPBL). Listed at 5 ft 6 in (1.68 m), 140 lb., she batted and threw right-handed.

Born in Sunbury, Ohio, Marilyn Olinger started playing sandlot ball with the boys of her neighborhood when she was a little girl, and played organized softball in Columbus, Ohio when she turned fourteen. She was noted by an All-American Girls Professional Baseball League scout while playing in a state tournament and received an invitation to the 1948 spring training, which was held in Opa-locka, Florida.

Olinger was assigned to the Grand Rapids Chicks during the training camp, but she started the year with the expansion Chicago Colleens. She returned to the Chicks during the midseason in time to help them to advance to the second round of the playoffs, which was won by the Fort Wayne Daisies, three to zero games.

While at Grand Rapids, Olinger and Alma Ziegler developed a nice chemistry as a double play combination around second base, helping the Chicks reach the playoffs during six consecutive seasons, including the Championship Title in 1953.

As a hitter, Olinger steadily improved in each season, collecting a career-high .267 batting average in 1951. Late in the 1953 season, she broke her ankle and had to see Grand Rapids clinch the title without her. After her injury, she decided not to come back the next season.

After baseball, Olinger went to work to NCR Corporation and later returned to playing amateur softball. In 1973, NCR cut back its work force and she was unemployed. She then worked in security field for the next 19 years before retiring in 1992.

Marilyn Olinger is part of Women in Baseball, a permanent display at the Baseball Hall of Fame and Museum at Cooperstown, New York unveiled in 1988, which is dedicated to the entire All-American Girls Professional Baseball League rather than any individual personality.

She died in 2006 in Columbus, Ohio, at the age of 78.

== Career statistics ==
Batting

GP	AB	R	H	2B	3B	HR	RBI	SB	TB	BB	SO	BA	OBP	SLG
599	2175	334	479	34	7	4	115	197	539	255	334	.220	.302	.248

Fielding

GP	PO	A	E	TC	DP	FA
599	1070	1608	319	2997	125	.894
