= Joyce Ricketts =

- Right fielder
- Born: April 25, 1933; Oquawka, Illinois, U.S.
- Died: May 8, 1992 (aged 59); Oquawka, Illinois, U.S.
- Batted: Left Threw: Right

Teams
- Grand Rapids Chicks (1953–1954)

Career highlights and awards
- Two-time All-Star Team (1953–1954); Championship Team (1953); Women in Baseball – AAGPBL Permanent Display Baseball Hall of Fame and Museum (1988)

Joyce Ricketts (April 25, 1933 – May 8, 1992) was a right fielder who played from 1953 through 1954 in the All-American Girls Professional Baseball League (AAGPBL). She batted left-handed and threw right-handed.

Born in Oquawka, Illinois, Joyce Ricketts barely got a chance to play before the All-American Girls Professional Baseball League folded after the 1954 season. An All-Star for the two years she played in the league, Ricketts ranked high in several offensive categories, which combined with a fine defense and a strong and secure throwing arm, to help the Grand Rapids Chicks win the league championship in the 1953 season.

In 1953 Ricketts played all 114 games for the Chicks, batting a .288 average and five home runs, while ranking fourth in runs batted in (71) and fifth in hits (120), doubles (19) and total bases (164), being selected for the All-Star Team. Grand Rapids, with Woody English at the helm, swept the Kalamazoo Lassies in the final best-of-three series.

In the series opening, Ricketts hit an RBI-single in the bottom of the fourth to put his team up (3–2), an advantage that was never lost and ended up winning the game, 5–2. Mary Lou Studnicka earned the victory, while Eleanor Moore was credited with a save. In the next game, Ricketts smashed a go-ahead, two-RBI double in the sixth inning, to give the Chicks a 4–3 lead for the rest of the game. Late in the inning, she used her strong arm from right field to throw out the potential tying run at home plate. Pitcher Earlene Risinger went the distance and struck out nine Lassies players, including a bases loaded strikeout to retire slugger Doris Sams for the last out of the game. In the series, Ricketts went 4-for-6 (.667) with a pair of doubles and four RBI to lead all hitters.

In 1954 Ricketts hit .317 and clobbered 15 home runs in 92 games, ending fourth in RBI (72) and eight in total bases (159). She also finished ninth in average and tied for second in doubles (14), while joining the All-Star Team for the second time.

Joyce Ricketts is part of Women in Baseball, a permanent display based at the Baseball Hall of Fame and Museum in Cooperstown, New York, which was unveiled in 1988 to honor the entire All-American Girls Professional Baseball League. She died in Oquawka, Illinois, at the age of 59.

== Statistics ==
Batting

GP	AB	R	H	2B	3B	HR	RBI	SB	TB	BB	SO	BA	OBP	SLG
207	707	111	212	33	9	20	143	14	323	109	39	.300	.393	.459

Fielding

GP	PO	A	E	TC	DP	FA
206	253	46	16	315	8	.969
