= Kay Blumetta =

- Pitcher / First base / Outfield
- Born: May 1, 1923; North Plainfield, New Jersey, U.S.
- Died: April 25, 1997 (aged 73); North Plainfield, New Jersey, U.S
- Batted: Right Threw: Right

debut
- 1944

Last appearance
- 1954

Career statistics
- Win–loss record: 75–91
- Strikeouts: 568
- Hits: 83
- Runs batted in: 29

Teams
- Minneapolis Millerettes (1944); Milwaukee Chicks (1944); Grand Rapids Chicks (1945); Peoria Redwings (1946–1947); Fort Wayne Daisies (1947–1950); Kalamazoo Lassies (1951–1954)

Career highlights and awards
- 2× AAGPBL champion (1944, 1954)

Catherine Kay Blumetta [Swish] (May 1, 1923 – April 25, 1997) was a utility who played for six different clubs in the All-American Girls Professional Baseball League (AAGPBL) between the 1944 and 1954 seasons. Listed at 5 ft 8 in (1.73 m), 150 lb., she batted and threw right-handed.

Born in North Plainfield, New Jersey, Blumetta was a solid and dependable player who appeared in eleven out of twelve seasons of the All-American Girls Professional Baseball League. She entered the league in 1944 with the expansion Minneapolis Millerettes, playing for them briefly before joining the Milwaukee Chicks during the midseason. She divided her playing time at first base and outfield, and was a member of the Milwaukee team that won the pennant that year. But she moved around for a while, as the AAGPBL shifted players as needed to help teams stay afloat.

In 1945 Blumetta played for the Grand Rapids Chicks and then found herself on the move again, this time to the Peoria Redwings (1946–1947), and then the Fort Wayne Daisies (1947–1950), before landing with the Kalamazoo Lassies for the rest of her career (1951–1954). She began pitching sidearm in 1946, until overhand pitching became effective in 1948 through the final season in 1954.

In 1948, Blumetta enjoyed her most productive season as a pitcher when she posted a 14–13 record with Fort Wayne. Often used as a pinch-hitter when she was not pitching, she also was used in the outfield for defensive purposes. In addition, she was a member of the 1954 Champions Lassies, during what turned out to be the league's final season.

Since 1988, Blumetta and the other AAGPBL players form part of the permanent display at the Baseball Hall of Fame and Museum at Cooperstown, New York, which is dedicated to the entire league rather than any individual player.

Blumetta died in her hometown of North Plainfield, New Jersey, at the age of 73.
