= Jaynne Bittner =

Jaynne Berrier Bittner
- Pitcher
- Born: March 17, 1926; Lebanon, Pennsylvania, U.S.
- Died: April 23, 2017 (aged 91); Ann Arbor, Michigan, U.S.
- Batted: Right Threw: Right

Teams
- South Bend Blue Sox (1947); Muskegon Lassies (1948); Grand Rapids Chicks (1949–'52, 1954); Fort Wayne Daisies (1952–'53)

Career highlights and awards
- Pennsylvania Sports Hall of Fame Induction

Jaynne Berrier Bittner [JB] (March 17, 1926 – April 23, 2017) was an American starting pitcher who played from 1948 through 1954 for four teams of the All-American Girls Professional Baseball League (AAGPBL). Listed at 5 ft 9 in (1.75 m), 140 lb, she batted and threw right-handed.

== Biography ==
Bittner was a top all-around athlete in high school. She won the tennis championship three years in a row, held the table tennis crown for two years and was the leading scorer on the basketball team. An AAGPBL scout signed her after seeing her basketball prowess, thinking that she had athletic abilities, endurance and fitness necessary to play baseball. She attended a league tryout in Allentown, Pennsylvania, and later was sent to the 1948 spring training held in Cuba. She had no baseball position, but the league was desperate for overhand pitchers, so she was a good pitching prospect.

Bittner entered the league in 1947 with the South Bend Blue Sox, playing for them one year before joining the Muskegon Lassies (1948), Grand Rapids Chicks (1949–52) and Fort Wayne Daisies (1952–53). Bittner posted a 9–9 record with a 2.55 earned run average as a 22-year-old rookie. Although she led the league in wild pitches (13) in 1949 and the following year issued the most balks (five), Bittner emerged in 1951 with Grand Rapids posting a 15–8 mark and a 2.95 ERA. Her most productive season came in 1953 with Fort Wayne, when she posted a 16–7 record and a 2.45 ERA. The Daisies made it to the playoffs in every year that Bittner pitched for them, but never won the Championship Title. She returned to the Chicks in 1954, which turned out to be the AAGPBL's last ever season.

After the league folded, Bittner moved to Detroit, Michigan, and drove a school bus. She also coached a softball team for 20 years. In 1980, Bittner became the first woman inducted in the Pennsylvania Sports Hall of Fame. Since 1988 she is part of Women in Baseball, a permanent display based at the Baseball Hall of Fame and Museum in Cooperstown, New York, which was unveiled to honor the entire All-American Girls Professional Baseball League. Bittner died on April 23, 2017, in Ann Arbor, Michigan.

== Pitching statistics ==
GP	W	L	W-L%	ERA	IP	H	RA	ER	BB	SO	WHIP
177	66	69	.489	3.38	1126	973	599	423	647	392	1.44
