= Lillian Faralla =

American baseball player (1924–2019)

- Pitcher / Utility
- Born: July 29, 1924; San Pedro, California, U.S.
- Died: July 26, 2019 (aged 94)
- Batted: Right Threw: Right

debut
- 1946

Last appearance
- 1951

Teams
- Peoria Redwings (1946); Fort Wayne Daisies (1947); South Bend Blue Sox (1948–1949, 1951); Kalamazoo Lassies (1950)

Career highlights and awards
- Championship team (1951); Three playoff appearances (1948-1949, 1951); Pitched two no-hitters in the same season (1949)

Lillian "Lil" Faralla (July 29, 1924 – July 26, 2019) was a female pitcher and utility who played from 1946 through 1951 in the All-American Girls Professional Baseball League (AAGPBL). She batted and threw right-handed.

== A brief history ==
The early 1940s saw unprecedented numbers of women entering the public realm in numerous traditionally male occupations. The demands of World War II left scores of businesses, including baseball, without adequate labor. Driven by the fear that Major League Baseball would be shut down for the duration of the war, Chicago Cubs owner Philip K. Wrigley created a women's league as a backup plan to keep baseball alive. The circuit existed from 1943 to 1954. It eventually became known as the All-American Girls Professional Baseball League (AAGPBL).

== Early life ==
A native of San Pedro, California, Faralla started playing softball when she was 14 years old for a team in her hometown. She played for six years with four different teams in the All-American Girls Professional Baseball League, being traded back and forth a couple of times when other teams had injuries, because she was able to fill in since she played a number of positions. A hard-throwing pitcher, she also appeared at second base, third, and right field.

== AAGPBL career ==
Faralla entered the league in 1946 with the Peoria Redwings, playing for them one year before joining the Fort Wayne Daisies (1947), South Bend Blue Sox (1948–1949), Kalamazoo Lassies (1950), and coming back to South Bend (1951). She posted a career-high 19 victories in 1949, and her career milestone also came in 1949, when she pitched two no-hitters in that season. She reached the playoffs with the Blue Sox in all three seasons she played for them, including the championship team in 1951.

"Women should have their own league (...) The game should be adapted for women players (...) Enjoying something you like to do and getting paid for it", Faralla recalled in an interview. It was the lessons of baseball, taught by AAGPBL managers such as Bill Allington, that the women would remember most about their time in the field of play. After the circuit folded in 1954, many of them would go on to coach softball and baseball themselves for schools and other organizations with teams.

In November 1988, Faralla, along with the entire AAGPBL, was inducted into the Baseball Hall of Fame and Museum in Cooperstown, New York. She died on July 26, 2019.

== Career statistics ==
Batting

GP	AB	R	H	2B	3B	HR	RBI	SB	TB	BB	SO	BA	OBP	SLG
266	607	43	127	10	3	3	63	25	152	63	99	.209	.284	.250

Pitching

GP	W–L	PCT	BB	SO	ERA
140	55–55	.500	392	238	2.00
