= Strikeout-to-walk ratio =

Measure in baseball statistics

In baseball statistics, strikeout-to-walk ratio (K/BB) is a measure of a pitcher's ability to control pitches, calculated as strikeouts divided by bases on balls.

A hit by pitch is not counted statistically as a walk, and therefore not counted in the strikeout-to-walk ratio.

The inverse of this calculation is the related statistic for hitters, walk-to-strikeout ratio (BB/K).

== Leaders ==
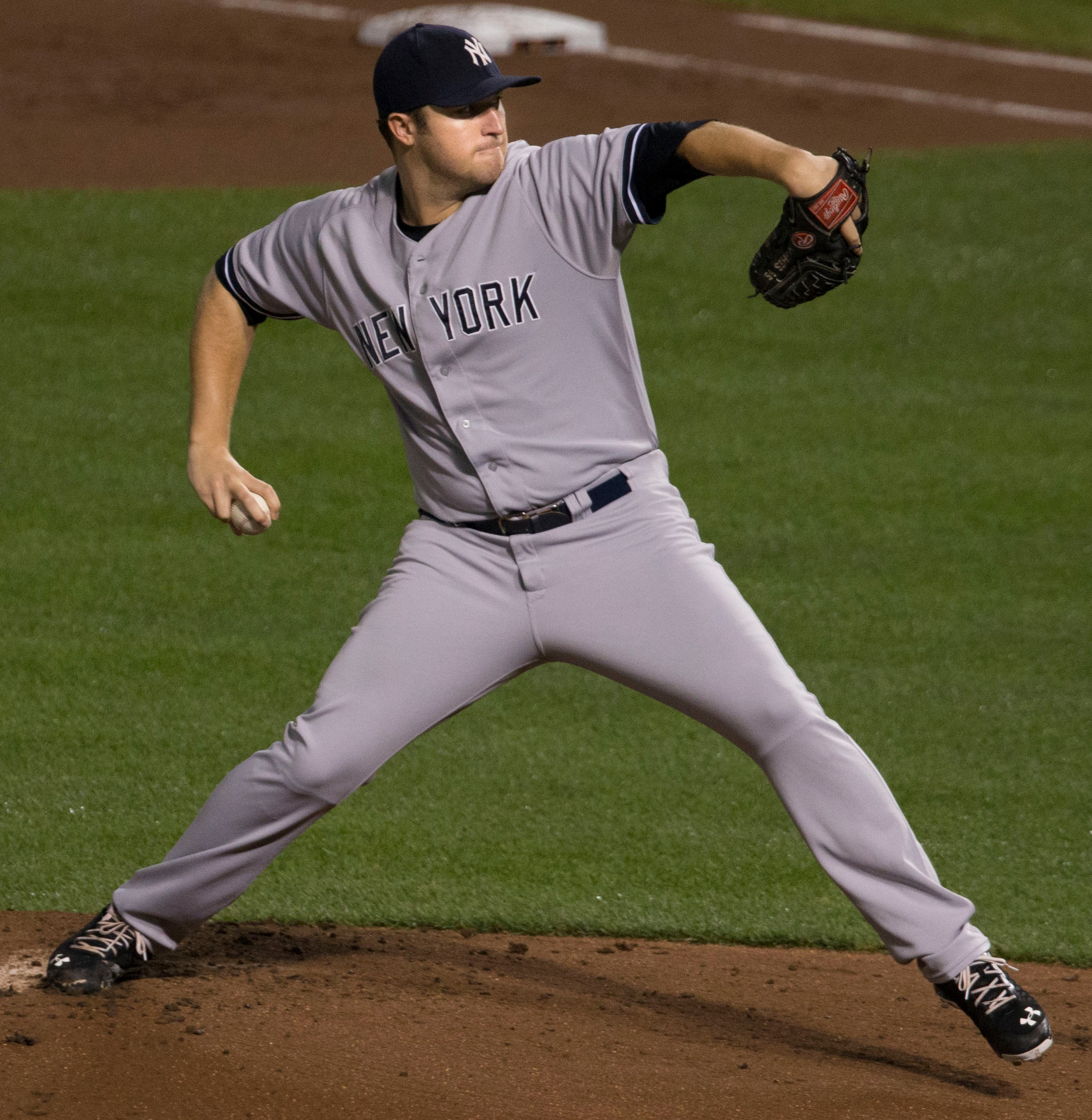
Single-season leader Phil Hughes (11.625 K/BB ratio).

A pitcher who possesses a great K/BB ratio is usually a dominant power pitcher, such as Randy Johnson, Pedro Martínez, Curt Schilling, or Mariano Rivera. However, in 2005, Minnesota Twins starting pitcher Carlos Silva easily led the major leagues in K/BB ratio with 7.89:1, despite striking out only 71 batters over 188⅓ innings pitched; he walked only nine batters.

As of the end of the 2026 regular season, the all-time career leaders among starting pitchers are Chris Sale (5.3649), Jacob deGrom (5.2481), and Tommy Bond (5.0363).

Through May 22, 2019, the all-time career leaders among relievers were Koji Uehara (7.94), Sean Doolittle (6.41), and Roberto Osuna (6.33).

The player with the highest single regular season K/BB ratio through 2022 was Minnesota Twins pitcher Phil Hughes in 2014, with a ratio of 11.625 (186 strikeouts and 16 walks). He is followed by Bret Saberhagen (11.00 in 1994) and Cliff Lee (10.28 in 2010).
