= Rose Gacioch =

- Outfielder / Pitcher
- Born: August 31, 1915; Wheeling, West Virginia, U.S.
- Died: September 9, 2004 (aged 89); Clinton Township, Michigan, U.S.
- Batted: Right Threw: Right

debut
- 1944, for the South Bend Blue Sox

Last appearance
- 1954, for the Rockford Peaches

Career statistics
- Batting average: .238
- Hits: 662
- Home runs: 18
- Runs batted in: 334
- Stolen bases: 165
- Win–loss record: 87–53
- Strikeouts: 288
- Stats at Baseball Reference

Teams
- South Bend Blue Sox (1944); Rockford Peaches (1945–1950); Grand Rapids Chicks (1950); Rockford Peaches (1951–1954)

Career highlights and awards
- 4× AAGPBL champion (1945, 1948-1950); 3× AAGPBL All-Star Team (1951–1953); Pitched a no-hitter on August 26, 1953; All-time season-record for assists by an outfielder (1943)

Rose M. Gacioch (/ˈɡeɪsɒtʃ/; August 31, 1915 – September 9, 2004) was a right fielder and pitcher who played from 1944 through 1954 in the All-American Girls Professional Baseball League (AAGPBL). Listed at 5 ft 6 in (1.68 m), 160 lb, Gacioch batted and threw right-handed. She had one of the most successful careers in AAGPBL history and possibly the most well-rounded of any female player. She was of Polish descent.

== Brief history ==
During the early 1940s, the AAGPBL recruited young women to play baseball to keep the spirit of the game alive while men fought overseas. The league, created in 1943 by the Chicago Cubs' owner Philip K. Wrigley, gave over 600 women athletes the opportunity to play professional baseball and to play it at a level never before attained. It was a neglected chapter of sports history, at least until 1992, when filmmaker Penny Marshall premiered her film A League of Their Own, which was a fictionalized account of activities in the AAGPBL. Starring Geena Davis, Tom Hanks, Madonna, Lori Petty and Rosie O'Donnell, this film brought a rejuvenated interest to the extinct league. The AAGPBL folded in 1954, but there is now a permanent display at the Baseball Hall of Fame and Museum since November 5, 1988 that honors those who were part of this unforgettable experience. Gacioch, along with the rest of the AAGPBL players, is now enshrined in the venerable building at Cooperstown, New York.

== Early life ==
A native of Wheeling, West Virginia, Gacioch was orphaned at the age of 16. She lied about her age, saying that she was 18 in order to take a job in a corrugating plant in her homeland. She also joined the Little Cardinals, a semi-professional baseball team in town, being the only girl on the team. What she considered her best pitch was the curveball which she had learned from her brother Steve, the oldest of four Gacioch children and the only boy.

One afternoon in 1934, the president of the corrugating company came to a Little Cardinals game. He met Maud Nelson, the manager of the All-Star Ranger Girls, and asked her if she could swing through Wheeling on her next tour, and give Gacioch a tryout. Gacioch performed well, as Nelson signed her for the Rangers. She alternated between the outfield and pitching. By then, women athletes hurried right into these teams. The trousers she used gave their name to pioneer women's baseball players, who were called Bloomer Girls.

1934 was the last year that the Bloomer Girls teams would play. Local companies that had sponsored women's baseball were switching over to the less expensive game of softball, an activity that relied mainly on a strong player, as is the pitcher. Gacioch, like most other women players, switched to softball, barnstorming around the Midwest on weekends for as much as $50 for two days' play. She was working in a factory during World War II when she read about the new women's baseball league, the All-American Girls Baseball League, being formed. At 29, she was a bit old to play baseball. Nevertheless, a co-worker said to her that his daughter was a chaperone for the South Bend Blue Sox, and he would ask her to come and look Gacioch up. Her chance came with a tryout at Pulaski Field in South Wheeling, just two blocks from her home.

== Professional career ==
For Gacioch, the result was a return to baseball as a member of the 1944 Blue Sox. The team was managed by Bert Niehoff, the same man that had sent pitcher Jackie Mitchell to face Babe Ruth and Lou Gehrig a decade earlier in an exhibition game. As it is reported, she struck out Ruth and Gehrig in succession.

At the end of the 1945 season, Gacioch was one of the ten players on the Blue Sox that Niehoff asked to have protected from being traded at a league meeting in Chicago. But the president of the South Bend club decided that Gacioch's poor English made her a liability for the team, not the ladylike image he was seeking for his organization. And so he traded her to the Rockford Peaches for the 1945 season.

After the transaction, Gacioch blossomed as one of the most consistent AAGPBL players, starring on four championship teams for the Peaches, and by setting several league records as both a hitter and a pitcher. During her first year in Rockford, she set a league record of 31 assists from the outfield, a mark she matched two years later. Then in the 1946 season, she led the league with nine triples while hitting a hefty .262 mark for her batting average.

Peaches manager Bill Allington moved Gacioch from the outfield to the pitcher's mound in 1948, and she responded with a 14–5 mark. Her most productive season came in 1951, when she posted a 20–7 record to become the league's only 20-game winner. She also pitched a no-hitter in 1953, and while not pitching played in the outfield, she amassed averages of .294 in 1951, .285 in 1953, and a top-career .304 in 1954 at age of 38, when she was old enough to be the mother of some of her teammates. Also in her final season, she recorded a significant total of 13 home runs.

A good-contact hitter, Gacioch only struck out 162 times in almost 3,000 career at-bats, and she ranks eighth in the AAGPBL All-Time list with 352 runs batted in. As a pitcher, she won 92 games and lost 60 in 174 appearances. Her skill as an overhand pitcher led to the league's changing its rules in 1947 to allow overhand pitching. She achieved four league championships and made the All-Star Team in 1951, 1952 and 1953. She retired from baseball after the league disbanded in 1954.

== Personal life ==
Between AAGPBL seasons, Gacioch took whatever job she could find in Rockford. She worked at bowling alleys, peeled potatoes and even made cigars.

Following her baseball career, she worked for 20 years as a press operator with Amerock Corporation in Rockford, Illinois, retiring in 1978. She then moved to Sterling Heights, Michigan. She never married and excelled in bowling. In 1954, she was the national champion in doubles bowling.

Gacioch visited Cooperstown for the AAGPBL exhibition opening in 1988 and reveled in her niche at the Hall of Fame. As she said in the interview reflecting on her career: "I always say: 'Now I got something on Pete Rose. I got there before he did'."

Rose Gacioch died in Clinton Township, Michigan, at the age of 89. She was buried in Detroit, Michigan at Mt. Olivet Cemetery.

== Career statistics ==
Batting

GP	AB	R	H	2B	3B	HR	RBI	SB	TB	BB	SO	BA	OBP	SLG	OPS
925	2954	270	703	69	34	18	352	167	894	200	162	.238	.286	.303	.589

== Sources ==
- All-American Girls Professional Baseball League Record Book – W. C. Madden. Publisher: McFarland & Company, 2000. Format: Paperback, 294pp. Language: English. ISBN 978-0-7864-3747-4
- Girls of Summer: The Real Story of the All American Girls Professional Baseball League - Lois Browne. Publisher: HarperCollins, 1992. Format: Paperback, 213 pp. Language: English. ISBN 0-00-637902-8
- Women in Baseball - Gai Ingham Berlage. Publisher: Praeger Trade, 1994. Format: Hardcover, 224pp. Language: English. ISBN 978-0-275-94735-4
