= Dorothy Mueller =

American baseball player (1925–1985)

- Pitcher
- Born: December 25, 1925; Cheviot, Ohio, U.S.
- Died: June 2, 1985 (aged 59)
- Batted: right Threw: right

Teams
- Peoria Redwings (1947–'48); South Bend Blue Sox (1950–'52); Grand Rapids Chicks (1953)

Career highlights and awards
- All-Star Team (1947); Three-time Championship Team (1951-'53); Four playoff appearances (1948, 1951-'53); Ranks 9th on the all-time list for wins; Pitched a no-hitter (1948)

Dorothy Mueller (December 25, 1925 – June 2, 1985) was a pitcher who played in the All-American Girls Professional Baseball League between the 1947 and 1953 seasons. Listed at 5 feet 11 inches (1.80 m) and 160 pounds (73 kg), she batted and threw right-handed. She was nicknamed Dottie or Sportie by her close friends and teammates.

== Career ==
A native of Cheviot, Ohio, Dorothy Mueller entered the AAGPBL in 1947 with the Peoria Redwings, playing for them until the 1948 season before joining the South Bend Blue Sox (1950-'52) and Grand Rapids Chicks. A hard-throwing pitcher for fifth-place Peoria, Mueller turned in a rookie record of 21–13 and made the All-Star team in 1947. She improved to a 21–9 mark in 1948, including a no-hitter, and posted career numbers in strikeouts (181) and winning percentage (.700). The Redwings advanced to the playoffs but were swept in three games by the Racine Belles.

In 1950, Mueller finished with an 18–9 mark in 27 pitching appearances with the Blue Sox, although South Bend finished fifth and missed the playoffs.

By the time the 1951 season rolled around, Mueller was an established pitcher. She went 10–2 in 13 games, teaming up with Jean Faut (15-7) to give South Bend a strong one-two punch pitching combination in the league. In addition, Muller divided her playing time between pitching and first base, hitting a .236 average with 18 runs and 30 RBI in 75 games. South Bend disposed of the Fort Wayne Daisies in the first round of the playoffs, two games to one, and later defeated the Rockford Peaches in the best-of-five-series to clinch the championship title.

The 1952 championship series was a repeat of the previous year with South Bend again facing Rockford. It was the second league championship for South Bend and the second time Faut pitched the deciding game. Mueller, who pitched sparingly and worked as a backup at first base, was traded to the Grand Rapids Chicks before the 1953 season.

In 1953, Grand Rapids finished in second place with a 62–44 record and advanced to the playoffs. In the best-of-three series, Mueller pitched a complete game and helped her team advance the final series by outlasting Rockford, 4–3. In the league's championship playoff, Grand Rapids met the third-place Kalamazoo Lassies (56-50), surprise winners in three games over the pennant-winning Fort Wayne (66-39). Grand Rapids swept Kalamazoo, by scores of 5–2 and 4–3, to capture the league's title. It was the third consecutive championship title for Mueller.

In a six-season career, Mueller posted a 92–63 record with a 1.80 earned run average in 86 pitching appearances. Her 92 victories ranks her ninth in the AAGPBL all-time list for most wins by a pitcher.

== Hall of fame ==
In 1988 Mueller became part of the AAGPBL permanent display at the Baseball Hall of Fame and Museum at Cooperstown, New York, which was inaugurated in honor of the entire league rather than individual baseball personalities.
