= Jean Faut =

American baseball pitcher (1925–2023)

- Pitcher
- Born: January 17, 1925; East Greenville, Pennsylvania, U.S.
- Died: February 28, 2023 (aged 98); Rock Hill, South Carolina, U.S.
- Batted: Right Threw: Right

Career statistics
- Win–loss record: 140–64
- Earned run average: 1.23
- Strikeouts: 913

Teams
- South Bend Blue Sox (1946–1953)

Career highlights and awards
- 4× AAGPBL All-Star Team (1949–1951, 1953); 2× AAGPBL champion (1951, 1952); 2× Player of the Year Award (1951, 1953); 2× Triple Crown Pitching winner (1952, 1953); 3× AAGPBL wins leader (1949, 1952, 1953); 3× AAGPBL strikeout leader (1951–1953); 3× AAGPBL ERA leader (1950, 1952, 1953); Single-season leader in shutouts (1949); 3× 20-win seasons (1949, 1950, 1952); Pitched two perfect games (1951, 1953); Pitched four no-hitters; AAGPBL records: All-time leader in earned run average (1.82)

Jean Anna Faut [Winsch/Eastman] (January 17, 1925 – February 28, 2023) was an American starting pitcher who played from 1946 through 1953 in the All-American Girls Professional Baseball League (AAGPBL). Listed at 5 ft 4 in (1.63 m), 137 lb., she batted and threw right-handed.

Jean Faut is considered by baseball historians and researchers as the greatest overhand pitcher in AAGPBL history. From 1946 through 1953, Faut set several all-time and single-season records. She compiled a lifetime record of 140–64 with a 1.23 earned run average in 235 games, registering the lowest career ERA for any pitcher in the league. Besides being the only professional baseball player to pitch two perfect games, her league achievements include pitching two no-hitters, twice winning the Triple Crown and collecting three 20-win seasons. She also led in wins and strikeouts three times, set the league record for single-season winning percentage at .909 (20–2), and led the South Bend Blue Sox to consecutive championships in 1951 and 1952.

Faut never had a losing season or an ERA above 1.51, being surpassed only by Helen Nicol for the most career wins (163). A four-time member of the All-Star Team, Faut was named Player of the Year in two out of eight possible seasons. Her baseball career, which spanned eight years, reflects the experiences of many women who played in the competitive era of overhand pitching in the AAGPBL, however like several other players from the league, she coupled her professional playing career with a more traditional lifestyle as a wife and mother.

== Professional career ==
A native of East Greenville, Pennsylvania, Faut grew up in the home of a working-class family. She was the second oldest daughter of Robert Faut, an automobile plant worker and park guard, and Eva (nee Gebert) Faut, a housewife. The young Jean, along with her two sisters and three brothers, were raised during the Great Depression era. The children were instructed by their parents to live frugally, save, and avoid debt. Unlike most AAGPBL players, Faut never played softball while growing up and had no previous professional experience. She attended East Greenville High School, where she excelled in track and field, basketball and field hockey. She also pitched batting practice for the school baseball team and hurled in exhibition games against the Cubs, a semiprofessional team in her hometown. In the process, she learned how to throw different pitches. After graduating from EGHS in 1942, Faut worked in a clothing factory until the spring of 1946, when she attended a tryout for the AAGPBL in Pascagoula, Mississippi.

As a result of the success of the league in its first year, two new teams were added in the 1944 season: the Milwaukee Chicks and the Minneapolis Millerettes. But both teams lost their franchises by the end of the year and were replaced by the Grand Rapids Chicks and the Fort Wayne Daisies in the 1945 season. The league added two more teams in 1946, the Muskegon Lassies and the Peoria Redwings. Faut was rewarded with a contract to play in the eight-team league and was assigned to the established South Bend Blue Sox, by then managed by Chet Grant, a former Notre Dame football player and the sports editor for the South Bend Tribune.

In 1946, the AAGPBL made significant changes in its rules, extending the length of the base paths and pitching distance and decreasing the size of the ball. Later in the season, the league allowed a sidearm pitching delivery, permitting the pitchers to add a curveball or sinker to their repertoire of fastball and changeup, all of which Faut had hurled before joining the league. All of these rule changes were designed to make the game more exciting and more like men's baseball. In her rookie season, Faut appeared in 101 games, mostly at third base, hitting a .177 (61-for-344) average with 40 runs batted in while scoring 37 runs. She committed 60 errors at third for a .893 fielding percentage. When the sidearm motion was approved, Blue Sox manager Grant included her on the pitching staff for the rest of the season. Faut posted an 8–3 record with 21 strikeouts and a 1.32 earned run average in 12 outings, including nine starts, eight complete games, and a pair of two-hitters in 81 innings of work, ranking third in ERA and winning percentage (.727).

That season, South Bend led the circuit in team batting with a .220 average, while finishing third in fielding with an average of .943. Grand Rapids' star Connie Wisniewski led the circuit in ERA (0.96) and shared with Racine's Joanne Winter the wins title (33), while Fort Wayne's Dorothy Collins topped in strikeouts (294) and shutouts (17). More than half of the batters averaged under .200, while the highest marks were recorded by Rockford's Dorothy Kamenshek (.316), South Bend's Bonnie Baker (.286), Racine's Sophie Kurys (.286), Grand Rapids' Merle Keagle (.284) and Kenosha's Audrey Wagner (.281). The Blue Sox finished in third place with a 70–42 mark, though lost in the semifinal round to Rockford, three games to one. In her first post-season, Faut went 0–2 with a 1.13 ERA against Racine. In Game 1 of the playoffs, she suffered the loss in a 17-inning pitching duel against Anna Mae Hutchison, when Maddy English knocked in the winning run in a 3–2 game.

Faut was a pitcher with an analytical mind, allowing her to remember pitching sequences from batter to batter and game to game. In pre-game team meetings, she would memorize the weakness of the opposite hitters and during the game vary the rotation of pitches she used. "Part of my success", she once reflected, "was that in my mind I could record the order of pitches I threw to each girl, so they never saw the same thing twice". She added "I was a mathematical whiz in school. They’d never know what was coming, so they’d start guessing".

The first AAGPBL spring training outside the United States was held in 1947 in Havana, Cuba, as part of a plan to create an International League of Girls Baseball. The All-Americans stayed at the Seville-Biltmore Hotel, and they played their games at the Gran Stadium.

The AAGPBL made the transition from underhand to full side-arm pitching in 1947. Before starting the season, Faut married Karl Winsch, a former Philadelphia Phillies pitching prospect from East Greenville, near her hometown. The couple established their initial residence in South Bend, Indiana, where she worked in the off-season for Ball-Band, a local division of the United States Rubber Company. Pitching in 44 games, Faut came through with a 1.15 ERA to go with her 19–13 record, allowing 56 runs (38 earned) on just 179 hits in a career-high 298 innings. She walked 67 batters and struck out 97, ending third in innings, fifth in ERA and eighth in strikeouts, while tying for fifth in wins. She also posted a .236 average in 56 games, ranking 19th in the league behind Kamenshek, who won her second consecutive title with a .306 mark. Her most durable performance came on July 31, when she defeated Eleanor Dapkus and the Belles in 22 innings by a 4–3 score. Faut spaced 16 hits, walked five, struck out eleven, and contributed two hits to her own cause.

In 1947 South Bend earned a respectable fourth place in the eight-team league with a 57–54 record, although was beaten by Grand Rapids in the first round of the playoffs, three to two games. Faut went 1–1 with one save and a 2.37 ERA in the postseason. At the time she was two months pregnant and gave birth to her first son, Larry, in March 1948.

The league moved fully to overhand pitching in 1948, which made the game close to regulation baseball. Such change adversely affected the performance of underhand pitchers, because many of them were experienced submariners who could not make the transition to the new pitching style. Consequently, many teams converted their outfielders to pitchers since they were used to throwing the ball overhand with power. Batters, too, had to make adjustments, since underhand pitches tend to rise, overhand to drop. In that season also were incorporated the Chicago Colleens and the Springfield Sallies, and the AAGPBL expanded to a historical peak of ten teams divided into Eastern and Western Divisions.

In 1948, Faut missed the spring training camp to be held in March and reported to the Blue Sox after her postnatal period. She recovered her old form in mid-June, determined to adjust her arm angle on her pitching deliveries. This change to overhand pitching did not mean that a pitcher could not drop down in her delivery. Occasionally, Faut threw a pitch below sidearm to keep opposing hitters off balance with an array of five quality pitches. She still produced a fine season, fashioning a 16–11 record with 165 strikeouts and a 1.44 ERA in 34 games, hurling 250 innings, ranking seventh among pitchers with at least 45 or more innings, ending seventh in ERA and eighth in strikeouts. The smaller ball and overhand delivery made her curveball pitch more effective. That season, Grand Rapids' Alice Haylett went 25–5 with a league-best 0.77 ERA, while Racine's Joanne Winter finished 25–12 and led in strikeouts (248). On September 4, Faut pitched her first no-hitter, beating the host Racine Belles, 7–0. Her teammate Lillian Faralla had thrown a no-hitter against Racine on May 11, so two Blue Sox pitchers defeated the Belles with two no-hitters in the same season.

South Bend, with Marty McManus at the helm, ended third (57–69) and lost to Grand Rapids in the first round of the playoffs, three to two games. In Game 1, Faut pitched 20 innings to beat Haylett, 3–2, in the longest game in AAGPBL post-season history. The Chicks won Game 2 in 11 innings, 3–2, to tie the series, but Faralla hurled a four-hit, 2–1 victory in Game 3. In another extra-inning duel, Haylett took revenge in Game 4, defeating Faut and South Bend in 15 innings by a 1–0 score, while in decisive Game 5 Mildred Earp silenced the South Bend hitters in a one-hit, 1–0 shutout, and Grand Rapids advanced to the finals. For the next year, the Colleens and the Sallies became rookie training teams, playing in exhibition games, recruiting new talent as they toured through the South and East.

Faut had mixed results in 1948, because she was forced to set aside from her teammates. Recently married, with a baby to care for, she began handling baseball like a professional job and could not socialize after games. As she recalled in an interview, "I had to go home, take care of my family, cook and clean, and all of those things". Nevertheless, in 1949 she recorded her best career season so far, considered by many historians to be the best individual season for any pitcher in AAGPBL history. Faut posted a 24–8 record with a 1.10 ERA in 34 games, allowing 47 runs (36 earned) on 136 hits and 118 walks, while striking out 120 in 261 innings of work. She led the league in wins and shutouts (12), finished second in innings and third in complete games (20). Only two pitchers gave up fewer earned runs, both of Rockford: Lois Florreich, who finished 22–7 with a 0.67 ERA in 269 innings, and Helen Nicol, who was 13–8 with a 0.98 ERA in 212 innings.

Throughout the 1949 season, South Bend mainly battled Rockford for first place. Although South Bend had a four-game lead in August, both clubs tied with identical records of 75–36 at the end of the year. On September 3, in the final home game of the regular season, Faut hurled her second no-hitter, a 2–0 victory against Fort Wayne. She pitched flawlessly and faced the minimum 27 batters, but still did not qualify for a perfect game, since she allowed an eighth-inning walk to Dorothy Schroeder, who later was erased on a double play. In the playoffs, Rockford eliminated South Bend in four straight games. Faut went 0–2 with a 2.58 ERA in two starts.

In 1950, the Muskegon team became the Kalamazoo Lassies. By then the advantage began to shift toward the batter. Rookie Betty Foss of Fort Wayne topped the loop with a .346 average, Rockford's Eleanor Callow and Racine's Sophie Kurys tied with seven home runs, and Grand Rapids' Pepper Paire finished with 70 runs batted in.

The new rule did not disrupt Faut; she finished 21–9 behind a 1.12 ERA in 36 games, allowing 64 runs (36 earned) on 175 hits and 104 walks while striking out 118 over 290 innings. She paced the circuit in ERA, edging Rockford's Lois Florreich by a minuscule 0.06%, and trailed Fort Wayne's Maxine Kline in wins (23) and Florreich in strikeouts (171). Faut also led in innings pitched and complete games (29), and joined the All-Star team for the second consecutive year. She contributed at the plate as well, hitting .217 (43-for-198) with 23 runs, 26 RBI and 15 stolen bases. Besides her accomplishments, it would almost be a lost effort for Faut, because South Bend finished in fifth place with a 55–55 mark and dropped out of the playoffs. The Racine team would change its name to Battle Creek Belles for the next year.

By the time the 1951 season rolled around, Faut was a successful and established pitcher. That year, her husband Karl Winsch took over as manager of South Bend. It was to be a breakthrough year for the Blue Sox as well. Faut finished 15–7 with a 1.33 ERA in 23 games, striking out 135, while giving up 43 runs (28 earned) on 121 hits and 65 walks in 190 innings. She led the league in strikeouts, tied for seventh in wins, and ranked third in ERA and in shutouts (seven). Meanwhile, Winsch enjoyed an auspicious managerial debut, Nevertheless, when he became manager of the team, it made the situation even stickier and increased Faut's isolation from her teammates. Perhaps to avoid charges of favoritism, Winsch reduced significantly the number of games and innings pitched by Faut in 1950. Most women in the league were unmarried, making Faut odd-woman-out on her team.

Faut reached her peak of the season on July 21, when she hurled a perfect game against the visiting Rockford Peaches at Playland Park. Ahead 2–0, Faut struck out five of the last nine hitters, including pitching ace Helen Nicol to end the game. The season started inauspiciously for Faut; her record in the first half was a good, however rather unremarkable 8–5 mark although, and notably, all five losses were by one run. This historic victory set the tone for the rest of the season. While South Bend placed third in the first-half standings, the team finished first in the second half, thus giving them a playoff berth. Their complete season record of 75 and 36 was best in the league that year. The competition she faced in that special game was among the best highlights of her career, because Rockford would end the season battling South Bend for the league championship.

South Bend defeated Fort Wayne in the first round of the playoffs, two games to one. Faut won two complete games by identical scores of 2 to 1 in the first and third contests. In Game 1, she allowed six hits, three walks and one earned run, while in the clincher Game 3, she struck out nine batters and gave up eight eights in a 10-inning effort. She finally was part of a club that advanced to the finals. In the other series, Rockford swept Grand Rapids in two games.

In the best-of-five championship round, Rockford won the first two games over the visiting South Bend. The final series moved to South Bend for the rest of the event. Faut started Game 3 with her team against the wall, 2 to 0. She responded with a 3–2 victory over Rockford, striking out 11 batters and walking two. The Blue Sox won Game 4 by a 6–3 score, in a contest shorted to seven innings by rain. The series was evened at 2–2.

In decisive Game 5, what was supposed to be a pitchers' duel between Lillian Faralla and Rose Gacioch turned out to be a hard-fought slugfest. South Bend came away a surprise winner to clinch the club's first AAGPBL title in the league. In addition to her 15 victories during the regular season, Faut won four more in the two playoffs. She earned the Player of the Year Award and made her third All-Star team in a row.

By 1952, only six teams remained in the league after Kenosha and Peoria were disbanded. That season saw Winsch become more demanding of his players in an extremely heavy-handed way with close scrutiny of each player. Faut again led the league in several pitching categories, but the fact her husband managed the team created friction between Faut and many of her teammates. Some of the women bristled under Winsch's leadership, so many refused to speak to either the manager or their star pitcher. Nevertheless, Faut overcame internal conflicts to command the circuit with a 20–2 mark in 23 starts for a .909 winning percentage, setting the all-time single season for this category. She allowed 31 runs—only 19 earned—on 111 hits and 42 walks while striking out 114 in 184 innings for a career-best 0.93 ERA. In addition, she led all pitchers in ERA, 0.51 ahead of Battle Creek's Gloria Cordes, and also in strikeouts, 23 ahead of Fort Wayne's Nancy Warren, while tying Fort Wayne's Rose Gacioch for the most wins, which was enough to win the pitching Triple Crown. At the plate, she hit a solid .291 average to finish in seventh place.

Faut missed the Player of the Year Award (by one vote) to Fort Wayne's first-bagger Betty Foss, who led the batters in runs (81), hits (137), doubles (26), triples (17) and RBI (74), was second in stolen bases (80), and hit .331 to finish second in the batting race behind her sister and teammate Joanne Weaver (.344). Faut failed to make the All-Star team, but pitched in the All-Star Game with South Bend as the host team. South Bend finished with a league-best record of 76–36, then eliminated Grand Rapids in the best-of-three series (2–0). Faut was the winning pitcher in the first contest in a 2–1 complete game, in which she got out of a no-outs, bases-loaded jam in the ninth inning, surrendering just one unearned run. South Bend handily defeated the Chicks in the second game, 6–1, with Faut delivering two RBI and relieving in the ninth to seal the victory. Rockford disposed of Fort Wayne in the other series, two games to one.

The 1952 championship series was a repeat of the previous year with South Bend again facing Rockford. It was a contest rocked by controversy as Faut lost the first game, delivering a sub-par performance when she surrendered an uncharacteristic seven runs on 13 hits. She was pulled in the seventh inning after giving up a two-run homer. The second game ended in another Rockford victory and a South Bend protest. Because their playing field was being readied for football, the Peaches had moved the right field fence in to 190 feet, 20 feet shorter than the league minimum. Consequently, the league disallowed the victory and forced a replay of Game 2. South Bend won it in 12 innings with Faut getting the victory when she pitched a scoreless final four innings in relief. As in the previous season, Faut was the winning pitcher in the decisive Game 5, hitting two triples and driving in two runs while turning in a 6–3 complete game performance. She was 2–1 with a 5.40 ERA in the playoffs, allowing over a hit per inning. It was the second league championship for South Bend and the second time Faut pitched the deciding game.

In 1953, the Battle Creek team became the Muskegon Lassies, and by the end of the season, it too, folded. Faut came back for her final year in the AAGPBL. Her team was weakened considerably by the player losses at the end of the previous season, and Faut was worn down from all the dissension. South Bend would finish the season second from last, compiling a 45–65 record. In spite of everything that had gone wrong, Faut still returned to post a 17–11 record and produced a league-best 1.51 ERA in 29 games, though league offensive levels were increasing. By her final season, only overhand pitching was allowed, the ball was a lively cork-centered ten inches, and the basepaths were seventy-five feet. More importantly from a pitching perspective, the pitching rubber was moved back to fifty-six feet, thirteen feet farther away than in 1946. At the same time, fences were moved in to allow for more home runs.

In her last season, Faut led all pitchers in ERA for the fourth year in a row and tied for the most wins with Eleanor Moore of Grand Rapids, who went 17–7 with a 2.00 ERA. In addition, Faut topped the league with 143 strikeouts to win the Triple Crown pitching for a second time. She also finished third in shutouts (5), seventh in innings (226), and tied for the third in complete games (24). On September 3 of that year, she hurled a perfect game against the Kalamazoo Lassies, 4–0. She is the only professional baseball player, male or female, to have pitched two perfect games. She helped herself with the bat as well, hitting a solid .275 (87-for-316) with 11 doubles, one triple, and a career-high four home runs, while driving in 38 runs and scoring 33 times in 98 games. In addition, she was included in the All-Star team for the fourth time, and once again won the Player of the Year honors, although South Bend finished fifth and missed the playoffs. Making that, she joined Doris Sams as the only two-time Player of the Year winners in AAGPBL history. On September 6, 1953, the Blue Sox management and around 1,500 fanatics honored their longtime diamond ace with a Jean Faut Night before a game at Playland Park. After collecting four hundred dollars in gifts, Faut ended her baseball career that evening with a 3–0, nine-hit defeat to the visiting Grand Rapids Chicks.

Faut retired from baseball, frustrated by tension with teammates owing to being the team's best player but also the wife of the disliked team manager. The 1954 season ended with only five teams remaining: Fort Wayne, Grand Rapids, Kalamazoo, Rockford and South Bend. The AAGPBL folded at the end of the season.

== Life after baseball ==
Faut became a competitive bowler after her baseball retirement. Divorced from Winsch in 1968, she married again in 1977 to Charles Eastman, a resident of Rock Hill, South Carolina who worked as a salesman for Textron Corporation. He died in 1993 after 16 years of marriage. After that, Faut excelled as a recreational golfer. An active grandmother with four grandchildren, she lived in Rock Hill, South Carolina.

Faut was part of the AAGPBL permanent display at the Baseball Hall of Fame and Museum at Cooperstown, New York, which was opened in 1988.

Faut died in Rock Hill, South Carolina on February 28, 2023, at the age of 98.

== Career statistics ==
Pitching

GP	W	L	W-L%	ERA	IP	H	R	ER	BB	SO	WHIP	SO/BB
235	140	64	.686	1.23	1780	1093	483	243	589	913	0.94	1.55

Batting

AB	R	H	2B	3B	HR	RBI	SB	BB	SO	BA
7,830	180	1610	391	52	8	203	112	233	100	.203

Collective fielding

PO	A	E	TC	DP	FA
467	1,392	143	2,002	34	.929

== AAGPBL perfect games ==
Pitcher(s)	Season	Team	Opponent
Annabelle Lee	1944	Minneapolis Millerettes	Kenosha Comets
Carolyn Morris	1945	Rockford Peaches	Fort Wayne Daisies
Doris Sams	1947	Muskegon Lassies	Fort Wayne Daisies
Jean Faut	1951	South Bend Blue Sox	Rockford Peaches
Jean Faut	1953	South Bend Blue Sox	Kalamazoo Lassies
