= Eleanor Moore =

Baseball player (1933–2022)

- Pitcher
- Born: November 1, 1933; Long Point, Illinois, U.S.
- Died: October 4, 2022 (aged 88)
- Batted: right Threw: right

Teams
- Chicago Colleens (1951); Kalamazoo Lassies (1951); Fort Wayne Daisies (1951–1952); Grand Rapids Chicks (1953–1954)

Career highlights and awards
- All-Star Team (1953); Single-season leader in wins (1953); Championship team (1953); Pitched a no-hitter (1954)

Eleanor Moore [Warner] (November 1, 1933 – October 4, 2022) was an American baseball pitcher who played from 1950 through 1954 in the All-American Girls Professional Baseball League (AAGPBL). Listed at 5 ft 10 in (1.78 m), Moore batted and threw right-handed. She was born in Long Point, Illinois.

== Summary ==
A hard-throwing hurler, Eleanor Moore played with four different teams of the All-American Girls Professional Baseball League during the final five years of its existence. It was during this time period that overhand pitching and smaller ball sizes were adopted, which benefited hitters but was detrimental to a pitcher's success. By the time her final season ended in 1954, Moore had fashioned a 49–46 pitching record (.516) with a 2.74 earned run average, including a no-hitter, an All-Star Team selection, and the lead for the most wins in a single-season.

Moore started her career in 1950 with the Chicago Colleens, a touring player development team, since she was only 17 years old and needed more skill development. She improved vastly and was promoted to the Kalamazoo Lassies in 1951, playing for them part of that season before joining the Fort Wayne Daisies (1951–1952) and the Grand Rapids Chicks (1952–1954). But not only was Moore a solid pitcher, she also often helped her own cause with the bat. In her rookie year, she hit two home runs in a game against the Springfield Sallies, but the Colleens lost 14–3. She also scored the third run in a lost cause. Eventually, she played at first base and hit a career .265 batting average.

In 1953 Moore won a career-high 17 games for Grand Rapids, tying for top in wins with Jean Faut of the South Bend Blue Sox. The Chicks made the trip to the playoffs and defeated the Rockford Peaches in the first round, two to one games, then beat Fort Wayne in three games to clinch the championship title. In addition, Moore was selected for her first and only All-Star Team.

During what turned out to be the league's final season, Moore hurled a no-hitter and pitched 21 complete games for Grand Rapids, who finished 46–45. Her performance was quite respectable, considering nineteen players hit at least .300. Joanne Weaver of Fort Wayne paced all hitters with a remarkable .429 average and 29 home runs, to set best-ever marks in AAGPBL history. Jean Geissinger, another Fort Wayne slugger, batted .377 with 26 home runs and a league-high 91 runs batted in, while her teammate Betty Foss hit .352 with 14 home runs and 54 RBI and South Bend's Wilma Briggs posted an even .300 with 25 home runs and 73 RBI.

Moore is part of the AAGPBL permanent display at the Baseball Hall of Fame and Museum at Cooperstown, New York, which was opened in 1988 in honor of the entire league rather than individual baseball personalities. She was a longtime resident of Grand Rapids, Michigan.
