= 1954 All-American Girls Professional Baseball League season =

- League: All-American Girls Professional Baseball League
- Sport: Baseball
- Games: 96
- Teams: 5

Regular season
- Season champions: Fort Wayne Daisies
- Season MVP: Joanne Weaver (FW)

Shaugnessy playoffs
- Champions: Kalamazoo Lassies

AAGPBL seasons
- 1953

The 1954 All-American Girls Professional Baseball League season marked the twelfth and last season of the circuit. The AAGPBL was left with five teams after the Muskegon Belles franchise folded at the end of the past season. As a result, it was the lowest number of teams since its opening season in 1943. The Fort Wayne Daisies, Grand Rapids Chicks, Kalamazoo Lassies, Rockford Peaches and South Bend Blue Sox competed through a 96-game schedule, while the Shaugnessy playoffs featured the top four teams in a best-of-three first round series, with the two winning teams facing in a best-of-five series to decide the championship.

== Regular season ==
Several changes were made to the rules for this season, making the game much like Major League Baseball. The ball size was reduced from 10 inches to 9 inches, while the pitching distance increased from 56 to 60 feet. In addition, the base paths were lengthened from 75 to 85 feet, five feet short of the major leagues. But the most significant change was the shortening of the outfield fences, which dramatically increased the number of home runs compared to those hit in the past. The five teams combined to hit 408 home runs, which tripled the number of homers hit during a regular season.

Joanne Weaver of Fort Wayne won her third consecutive batting title in a row, this time clearing the .400 batting average barrier with a .429 mark. Not since Ted Williams in the majors in 1941 (.406) and minor leaguer Artie Wilson in 1948 (.402) had someone broken the .400 barrier, and nobody has done it since. Weaver also set single season records for the most home runs (29), total bases (254), on-base percentage (.479) and slugging average (.763). No pitcher won 20 games for the second year in a row, while South Bend's Janet Rumsey topped the league in earned run average (2.18) and complete games (21), ending second in wins (15), shutouts (5) and innings pitched (169). Gloria Cordes of Kalamazoo turned in the best pitching performance of the year, when she hurled three consecutive shutouts in 34 scoreless innings of work. Weaver was honored with the Player of the Year Award at the end of the season.

The only team not to make it to the postseason was the last-place Rockford Peaches, the most successful squad in league history after winning four titles in the previous 11 seasons, including three in a row at one point.

== Teams ==
1954 All-American Girls Professional Baseball League Teams
Team	City	Stadium
Fort Wayne Daisies	Fort Wayne, Indiana	Memorial Park
Grand Rapids Chicks	Grand Rapids, Michigan	South High School Field
Kalamazoo Lassies	Kalamazoo, Michigan	Catholic Athletic Association Field
Rockford Peaches	Rockford, Illinois	Beyer Stadium
South Bend Blue Sox	South Bend, Indiana	Playland Park

== Map of teams ==
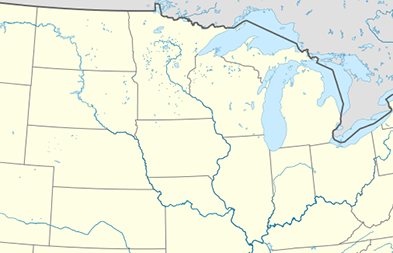
All-American Girls Professional Baseball League teams

== Standings ==
Rank	Team	W	L	W-L%	GB
1	Fort Wayne Daisies	54	40	.574	—
2	South Bend Blue Sox	48	44	.522	5
3	Grand Rapids Chicks	46	45	.505	6½
4	Kalamazoo Lassies	48	48	.500	7
5	Rockford Peaches	37	55	.402	16

== Postseason ==
First round Best of three series
1	Fort Wayne Daisies	2
3	Grand Rapids Chicks	0
2	South Bend Blue Sox	1
4	Kalamazoo Lassies	2

Second round Best of five series
1	Fort Wayne Daisies	2
4	Kalamazoo Lassies	3

=== First round ===
In the first round of the postseason, first place Fort Wayne faced third place Grand Rapids and second place South Bend played fourth place Kalamazoo. Fort Wayne defeated Grand Rapids, 8–7, in Game 1. After that, Grand Rapids team members voted not to play against Fort Wayne the next two contests, because the league had allowed Rockford catcher Ruth Richard to play on the Fort Wayne team as a last-minute replacement for Rita Briggs, who was sidelined with a broken wrist. During a debate over the eligibility of Richard, Fort Wayne manager Bill Allington and Grand Rapids manager Woody English came into a fistfight at home plate before Game 2. Grand Rapids forfeited both games to give the Daisies the first round. In the other series, Kalamazoo lost the first game to South Bend, 6–3, but pitchers Nancy Warren and Elaine Roth held the Blue Sox in the next two games by scores of 6–3 and 10–7, respectively.

=== Championship series ===
In Game 1 of the final series, the Kalamazoo Lassies defeated the Fort Wayne Daisies 17–9 behind a four-hit, seven strong innings from June Peppas, who also helped herself by hitting 2-for-4, including one home run. Her teammates Carol Habben, Fern Shollenberger and Chris Ballingall, who hit a grand slam, also slugged one each. Katherine Horstman connected two home runs for the Daisies in a lost cause, and her teammate Joanne Weaver slugged one. Maxine Kline, who had posted an 18–7 record with 3.23 earned run average during the regular season, gave up 11 runs in six innings and was credited with the loss.

Fort Wayne evened the series against Kalamazoo winning Game 2, 11–4, after hitting a series-record five home runs off two pitchers. Horstman started the feat with a two-run home run to open the score in the first inning. In the rest of the game, Betty Foss added two homers with five runs batted in, while Joanne Weaver and Jean Geissinger added solo shots. Nancy Mudge and Dorothy Schroeder homered for Kalamazoo, and Peppas, who played at first base, hit a solo homer in three at-bats. Marilyn Jones limited the Lassies to four runs on nine hits. Phyllis Baker was the winning pitcher and Gloria Cordes was the loser.

In Game 3, the Daisies beat the Lassies, 8–7, fueled again by a heavy hitting performance from Weaver, who hit a double, a triple and a three-run home run in five at bats, driving in four runs. Peppas went 1-for-4 to spark a seventh-inning three-run rally, but Fort Wayne came back in the bottom of the inning with two runs that marked the difference. Phyllis Baker won the game and Nancy Warren was the losing pitcher.

In another close score, Kalamazoo evened the series in Game 4 with a 6–5 victory against Fort Wayne, behind a strong pitching effort by Cordes, who hurled a complete game. Ballingall led the offensive with three hits, one run and one RBI before being ejected in the ninth inning. Peppas also contributed with a single, a double and one RBI in four at-bats. Kline lost her second decision in the series.

In decisive Game 5, Peppas pitched a clutch complete game and went 3-for-5 with an RBI against her former Daisies team, winning by an 8–5 margin to give the Lassies the championship title. She received support from Mary Taylor (5-for-5), Balingall (3-for-4) and Schroeder, who drove in the winning run off pitcher Jones in the bottom of the eighth. Peppas finished with an average of .400 (6-for-15) and collected two of the three Lassies victories, to become the winning pitcher of the last game in league history.

== Batting statistics ==
Statistic	Player	Record
Batting average	Joanne Weaver (FW); Jean Geissinger (FW); Eleanor Moore (GR); Betty Foss (FW); Betty Francis (FW); June Peppas (KAL); Catherine Horstman (FW); Eleanor Callow (ROC); Marguerite Pearson (GR); Joyce Ricketts (GR); Margaret Russo (ROC); Dorothy Schroeder (KAL); Wilma Briggs (SB)	.429.377.375.352.350.333.327.326.326.317.313.304.300
Runs scored	Joanne Weaver (FW); Betty Foss (FW); Jean Geissinger (FW); June Peppas (KAL); Betty Wanless (SB); Nancy Mudge (KAL); Jean Smith (GR); Wilma Briggs (SB); Catherine Horstman (FW); Marguerite Pearson (GR); Margaret Russo (ROC); Joyce Ricketts (GR); Dorothy Schroeder (KAL); Eleanor Callow (ROC); Gertrude Dunn (SB); Chris Ballingall (KAL)	109; 80; 78; 75; 75; 74; 74; 69; 68; 68; 67; 63; 63; 59; 59; 54
Hits	Joanne Weaver (FW); June Peppas (KAL); Jean Geissinger (FW); Betty Foss (FW); Betty Francis (FW); Catherine Horstman (FW); Ruth Richard (ROC); Wilma Briggs (SB); Dorothy Schroeder (KAL); Gertrude Dunn (SB); Joyce Ricketts (GR); Eleanor Callow (ROC); Marguerite Pearson (GR); Margaret Russo (ROC); Betty Wanless (SB); Carol Habben (ROC); Nancy Mudge (KAL); Joan Berger (ROC)	143; 122; 118; 117; 106; 98; 97; 95; 95; 93; 92; 89; 89; 89; 88; 85; 82; 81
Doubles	Jean Geissinger (FW); Joanne Weaver (FW); Gertrude Dunn (SB); Joyce Ricketts (GR); Jean Smith (GR); Betty Foss (FW); Betty Francis (FW); Jean Havlish (FW); Catherine Horstman (FW); Nancy Mudge (KAL); Betty Wanless (SB); Joan Berger (ROC); Ruth Richard (ROC)	17; 16; 14; 14; 14; 13; 13; 13; 13; 13; 13; 12; 12
Triples	Eleanor Moore (GR); Joyce Ricketts (GR); Joanne Weaver (FW); Joan Berger (ROC); Alice Blaski (FW); Betty Francis (SB); Jean Geissinger (FW); Catherine Horstman (FW); Margaret Russo (ROC); Mary Weddle (FW)	5; 4; 4; 2; 2; 2; 2; 2; 2; 2
Home runs	Joanne Weaver (FW); Jean Geissinger (FW); Wilma Briggs (SB); Jean Lovell (KAL); Eleanor Callow (ROC); Marguerite Pearson (GR); Chris Ballingall (KAL); Dorothy Schroeder (KAL); Catherine Horstman (FW); June Peppas (KAL); Carol Habben (ROC); Joyce Ricketts (GR); Betty Wanless (SB); Betty Foss (FW); Rose Gacioch (ROC); Margaret Russo (ROC)	29; 26; 25; 21; 20; 18; 17; 17; 16; 16; 15; 15; 15; 14; 13; 10
Runs batted in	Jean Geissinger (FW); Joanne Weaver (FW); Wilma Briggs (SB); Joyce Ricketts (GR); Jean Lovell (KAL); Dorothy Schroeder (KAL); Fern Shollenberger (KAL); Betty Francis (SB); Eleanor Callow (ROC); Marguerite Pearson (GR); Jean Smith (GR); Catherine Horstman (FW); Betty Foss (FW); Renae Youngberg (GR)	91; 87; 73; 72; 69; 65; 58; 58; 58; 57; 56; 55; 54; 50
Stolen bases	Joanne Weaver (FW); Betty Foss (FW); Nancy Mudge (KAL); Jean Smith (GR); Mary Froning (SB); Betty Wanless (SB); Gertrude Dunn (SB); Eleanor Callow (ROC); Joan Berger (ROC); Margaret Russo (ROC); Jean Geissinger (FW); Wilma Briggs (SB); Dorothy Schroeder (KAL)	79; 34; 33; 28; 26; 26; 25; 23; 19; 17; 17; 16; 11
Total bases	Joanne Weaver (FW); Jean Geissinger (FW); Wilma Briggs (SB); June Peppas (KAL); Betty Foss (FW); Catherine Horstman (FW); Eleanor Callow (ROC); Joyce Ricketts (GR); Dorothy Schroeder (KAL); Betty Wanless (SB); Marguerite Pearson (GR); Jean Lovell (KAL); Betty Francis (FW); Carol Habben (ROC); Margaret Russo (ROC); Ruth Richard (ROC); Gertrude Dunn (SB)	254; 217; 179; 174; 172; 163; 160; 159; 154; 150; 148; 142; 141; 137; 132; 130; 127

== Pitching statistics ==
Statistic	Player	Record
Wins	Maxine Kline (FW); Janet Rumsey (SB); Eleanor Moore (GR); Gloria Cordes (KAL); Nancy Warren (KAL); Migdalia Pérez (ROC); Dolly Vanderlip (SB); Jeanie Descombes (GR); Catherine Horstman (FW); Dolores Lee (ROC); Glenna Sue Kidd (SB); Noella Leduc (FW); Marilyn Jones (FW); Jean Marlowe (KAL); Rose Gacioch (ROC); Earlene Risinger (GR)	18; 15; 14; 12; 12; 11; 11; 10; 10; 10; 9; 9; 8; 8; 7; 7
Winning percentage	Maxine Kline (FW); Catherine Horstman (FW); Janet Rumsey (SB); Eleanor Moore (GR); Dolly Vanderlip (SB); Gloria Cordes (KAL); Glenna Sue Kidd (SB); June Peppas (KAL); Nancy Warren (KAL); Jeanie Descombes (GR); Marilyn Jones (FW); Dolores Lee (ROC); Migdalia Pérez (ROC)	.720.714.714.667.647.632.600.600.571.556.500.500.500
Earned run average	Janet Rumsey (SB); Dolly Vanderlip (SB); Catherine Horstman (FW); Glenna Sue Kidd (SB); Elaine Roth (KAL); Maxine Kline (FW); Marie Mansfield (ROC); Eleanor Moore (GR); June Peppas (KAL); Migdalia Pérez (ROC); Dolores Lee (ROC)	2.18; 2.40; 2.85; 2.91; 3.14; 3.23; 3.27; 3.31; 3.32; 3.73; 3.91
Strikeouts	Dolores Lee (ROC); Maxine Kline (FW); Janet Rumsey (SB); Gloria Cordes (KAL); Jeanie Descombes (GR); Nancy Warren (KAL); Marilyn Jones (FW); Eleanor Moore (GR); Marie Mansfield (ROC); Glenna Sue Kidd (SB); Catherine Horstman (FW); Rose Gacioch (ROC); Jean Marlowe (KAL); Earlene Risinger (GR); Phyllis Baker (SB/FW); Dolly Vanderlip (SB)	94; 91; 89; 86; 63; 63; 59; 53; 52; 50; 46; 45; 43; 38; 30; 30
Games pitched	Maxine Kline (FW); Nancy Warren (KAL); Janet Rumsey (SB); Jaynne Bittner (GR); Gloria Cordes (KAL); Noella Leduc (FW); Eleanor Moore (GR); Migdalia Pérez (ROC); Elaine Roth (KAL); Jean Marlowe (KAL); Earlene Risinger (GR); Phyllis Baker (SB/FW); Jeanie Descombes (GR); Rose Gacioch (ROC); Marilyn Jones (FW); Dolores Lee (ROC); Josephine Hasham (ROC/GR)	28; 26; 25; 24; 24; 24; 24; 24; 24; 23; 23; 22; 22; 22; 22; 22; 20
Complete games	Eleanor Moore (GR); Janet Rumsey (SB); Dolores Lee (ROC); Maxine Kline (FW); Nancy Warren (KAL); Rose Gacioch (ROC); Jean Marlowe (KAL); Migdalia Pérez (ROC); Several others	21; 21; 20; 19; 18; 17; 15; 15; 14
Shutouts	Maxine Kline (FW); Janet Rumsey (SB); Gloria Cordes (KAL); Dolores Lee (ROC); Dolly Vanderlip (SB); Several others	6; 5; 4; 4; 4; 3
Innings pitched	Maxine Kline (FW); Janet Rumsey (SB); Migdalia Pérez (ROC); Eleanor Moore (GR); Earlene Risinger (GR); Dolores Lee (ROC); Rose Gacioch (ROC); Nancy Warren (KAL); Jean Marlowe (KAL); Elaine Roth (KAL); Gloria Cordes (KAL); Glenna Sue Kidd (SB); Marilyn Jones (FW); Jaynne Bittner (GR); Phyllis Baker (SB/FW); Noella Leduc (FW); Dolly Vanderlip (SB); Jeanie Descombes (GR)	181; 169; 164; 163; 153; 152; 152; 151; 147; 146; 145; 133; 131; 129; 129; 125; 120; 117

== See also ==
- 1954 Major League Baseball season
- 1954 Nippon Professional Baseball season
