= Shirley Burkovich =

American baseball player (1933–2022)

Shirley "Hustle" Burkovich
- Infield/outfield utility and pitcher
- Born: February 4, 1933; Pittsburgh, Pennsylvania, U.S.
- Died: March 31, 2022 (aged 89); Rancho Mirage, California, U.S.
- Batted: Right Threw: Right

Teams
- Chicago Colleens (1949); Springfield Sallies (1950); Rockford Peaches (1951)

Career highlights and awards
- Women in Baseball – AAGPBL Permanent Display, Baseball Hall of Fame and Museum (1988)

Shirley Burkovich (February 4, 1933 – March 31, 2022) was an American professional baseball infielder, outfielder and pitcher who played from 1949 through 1951 in the All-American Girls Professional Baseball League (AAGPBL). Listed at 5 ft 8 in (1.73 m) and 150 pounds (68 kg), she batted and threw right-handed.

Burkovich was one of forty players from Pennsylvania who played on the All-American Girls Professional Baseball League clubs. She was nicknamed "Hustle" for her boundless intensity on the field, and filled in at every position except catcher during her three seasons in the league.

== Career ==
Shirley Burkovich was born in Pittsburgh, Pennsylvania, and raised in Swissvale. Burkovich started playing sandlot baseball with the boys of her neighborhood when she was a little girl, but never played organized softball. Though she attended three different high schools, Burkovich played basketball and field hockey in all of them, and also played in the Westinghouse Girls Basketball League.

At age 16, she was signed to a contract by the All-American Girls Professional Baseball League (AAGPBL) after attending a tryout in Pittsburgh. Because she was still in high school, she needed permission from her parents and the school district to leave school in March for spring training.

Burkovich played for the Chicago Colleens, Springfield Sallies and Rockford Peaches from 1949 to 1951, collecting a .229 batting average and a .325 on-base percentage in 37 games. She also made three relief appearances and did not have a decision. Some greats of women's professional baseball of that era include Jaynne Bittner, Ann Cindric, Jean Faut, Jean Geissinger, Jean Marlowe, Marguerite Pearson, Ruth Richard, Sarah Jane Sands, Fern Shollenberger and Jane Stoll, among others.

After baseball, Burkovich went to work for Pacific Bell Telephone for 30 years and retired in 1983. She also was an active collaborator in different projects of the AAGPBL Players Association since its founding in 1982. The association helped bring the league's stories to the public eye and was largely responsible for the opening of Women in Baseball, a permanent display at the Baseball Hall of Fame and Museum, which was unveiled in 1988 to honor the entire All-American Girls Professional Baseball League rather than any individual personality.

Shirley Burkovich made her film acting debut playing the role of older Alice "Skeeter" Gaspers in the 1992 film A League of Their Own, which was a fictionalized account of activities in the AAGPBL. This film, directed by Penny Marshall, brought a returned celebrity to many of the former AAGPBL players.

== Personal life ==
After baseball, Burkovich lived in Cathedral City, California, where she worked as a member of the AAGPBL Players Association Board of Directors.

Burkovich was great-aunt to Bravo TV's Vanderpump Rules star, Scheana Shay.

She died at her home in Rancho Mirage, California, on March 31, 2022, at the age of 89. She is interred at Forest Lawn Cemetery in Cathedral City.

== Batting statistics ==
GP	AB	R	H	2B	3B	HR	RBI	SB	BB	SO	BA	OBP	SLG
37	105	18	24	0	2	0	16	4	12	14	.229	.325	.267

Note: Statistics were incomplete for the touring teams in 1949 and 1950.
