= Gertrude Dunn =

American baseball player

- Shortstop
- Born: September 30, 1933; Sharon Hill, Pennsylvania, U.S.
- Died: September 29, 2004 (aged 70); Avondale, Pennsylvania, U.S.
- Batted: Right Threw: Right

debut
- 1951, for the Battle Creek Belles

Last appearance
- 1954, for the South Bend Blue Sox

Teams
- Battle Creek Belles (1951); South Bend Blue Sox (1951–1954)

Career highlights and awards
- Rookie of the year (1952); Women in Baseball – AAGPBL Permanent Display at Baseball Hall of Fame and Museum (1988)

Gertrude Dunn
Personal information
- Nationality: American

Sport
- NCAA team: West Chester (1960)
- International team: US Women's National Team

Gertrude Dunn (September 30, 1933 – September 29, 2004) was an American baseball player with the All-American Girls Professional Baseball League, the league made famous by the 1992 film A League Of Their Own.

== Career ==
Dunn played shortstop on two teams, the Battle Creek Belles and the South Bend Blue Sox, and was named "Rookie of the Year" in 1952.

When the league was unable to continue in 1955, Dunn joined several other players selected by former Fort Wayne Daisies manager Bill Allington to play in the national touring team known as the All-Americans All-Stars. The team played 100 games, each booked in a different town, against male teams, while traveling over 10,000 miles in the manager's station wagon and a Ford Country Sedan. Besides Dunn, the Allington All-Stars included players as Joan Berger, Gloria Cordes, Jeanie Descombes, Betty Foss, Mary Froning, Jean Geissinger, Katie Horstman, Maxine Kline, Dolores Lee, Magdalen Redman, Ruth Richard, Dorothy Schroeder, Jean Smith, Dolly Vanderlip and Joanne Weaver, among others.

She later attended West Chester University of Pennsylvania and graduated with the class of 1960.

Dunn was a player on the United States women's national field hockey team. She also coached field hockey and was named to the USA Field Hockey Hall of Fame on January 16, 1988.

=== Career statistics ===
==== Batting ====
| GP | AB | R | H | 2B | 3B | HR | RBI | SB | TB | BB | SO | BA | OBP | SLG | OPS |
|---|---|---|---|---|---|---|---|---|---|---|---|---|---|---|---|
| 344 | 1226 | 154 | 320 | 49 | 5 | 6 | 105 | 70 | 397 | 138 | 46 | .261 | .336 | .324 | .660 |

==== Fielding ====
| GP | PO | A | E | TC | DP | FA |
|---|---|---|---|---|---|---|
| 331 | 557 | 1028 | 140 | 1725 | 77 | .919 |

== Death and legacy ==
At the age of 70, on September 29, 2004, Dunn died in Avondale, Pennsylvania when the Piper Archer airplane she was solo-piloting crashed shortly after takeoff from New Garden Airport.

She was posthumously inducted into the National Lacrosse Hall of Fame and Museum in Baltimore, Maryland in 2007.
