= Magdalen Redman =

American baseball player (1930–2020)

- Catcher / Infielder
- Born: July 2, 1930; Waupun, Wisconsin, U.S.
- Died: August 22, 2020 (aged 90); Oconomowoc, Wisconsin, U.S.
- Batted: Right Threw: Right

Teams
- Kenosha Comets (1948–1949); Grand Rapids Chicks (1950–1954)

Career highlights and awards
- Championship (1953); Twice led all catchers in fielding average (1949, 1953)

Magdalen "Mamie" Redman (July 2, 1930 – August 22, 2020) was a catcher and utility infielder who played from 1948 through 1954 in the All-American Girls Professional Baseball League (AAGPBL). Listed at 5 ft 5 in (1.65 m), 150 lb., she batted and threw right-handed.

== Early life ==
Born in Waupun, Wisconsin, Magdalen Redman grew up in the years before Little League Baseball allowed girls to play, and she had to play sandlot ball with the neighborhood kids. She did not start playing organized softball until age 17 in Oconomowoc, about 37 miles away from Waupun, where she was spotted by an AAGPBL scout. "They sent a tentative contract and invitation to spring training in the mail. I remember being told that I had made the final cut—I don't remember anything further about a contract," Redman said in an interview. She attended the 1948 spring training at Opa-locka, Florida, and was located to the Kenosha Comets, playing for them for two years before joining the Grand Rapids Chicks from 1950 to 1954.

== AAGPBL career ==
Unspectacular, but quite effective, Redman had a solid career during her seven years in the league, being noted by her enthusiastic and great knowledge of the game. In her rookie season she played every fielding position except pitcher. After that she played at infield, mainly at third base, before converting to catcher for the rest of her career. She had an effective defense, being able to catch low balls and block home plate well, which combined with a strong and secure throwing arm.

In 1949 Redman posted the best fielding average among catchers with a .978 mark. Then, she repeated her feat in 1953 after leading all-catchers with a .975 average, helping Grand Rapids win the Championship Series. Her most productive season came in 1954, when she posted a .240 batting average with 39 runs and 20 RBI in 75 games, all career numbers.

A modest .172 career hitter, she collected a notable .349 on-base percentage while batting .267 with three runs and three RBI in six playoff games. As a catcher, she committed only 40 errors in 1,345 chances for a .970 average.

== Bill Allington All-Stars ==
When the league was unable to continue in 1955, Redman joined several other players selected by former Fort Wayne Daisies manager Bill Allington to play in the national touring team known as the All-Americans All-Stars. The squad played 100 games, each booked in a different town, against male teams, while traveling over 10,000 miles in the manager's station wagon and a Ford Country Sedan. Besides Redman, the Allington All-Stars included players as Joan Berger, Gloria Cordes, Jeanie Descombes, Gertrude Dunn, Betty Foss, Mary Froning, Jean Geissinger, Katie Horstman, Maxine Kline, Dolores Lee, Ruth Richard, Dorothy Schroeder, Jean Smith, Dolly Vanderlip and Joanne Weaver, among others.

== After retirement ==
Following her baseball career, Redman taught physical education at Oconomowoc High School and worked as a high school mathematics teacher for 26 years. She also traveled through the United States, Canada, and Europe to teach adult bible studies. In addition, she enjoyed many outdoor activities and was an avid golfer. "I carried an 8 or 9 handicap most of the time," she explained.

Since 1988 Redman has been part of Women in Baseball, a permanent display based at the Baseball Hall of Fame and Museum in Cooperstown, New York, which was unveiled to honor the entire All-American Girls Professional Baseball League rather than individual baseball personalities.

Mamie Redman lived in Oconomowoc, Wisconsin. She died in Oconomowoc on August 22, 2020.

== Career statistics ==
Batting

GP	AB	R	H	2B	3B	HR	RBI	SB	BB	SO	BA	OBP
369	918	90	158	15	2	2	163	10	162	101	.172	.349

Fielding

GP	PO	A	E	TC	DP	FA
320	1017	288	40	1345	19	.970
