= Maxine Kline =

American baseball player (1929–2022)

- Pitcher
- Born: September 16, 1929; North Adams, Michigan, U.S.
- Died: June 9, 2022 (aged 92); Hillsdale, Michigan, U.S.
- Batted: Right Threw: Right

Career statistics
- Win–loss record: 116–65
- Earned run average: 2.05
- Strikeouts: 495

Teams
- Fort Wayne Daisies (1948–1954)

Career highlights and awards
- 5x AAGPBL All-Star Team (1950–1954); Pitched two no-hitters (1949, 1954); 2x AAGPBL wins leader (1950, 1954)

Maxine Kline (later Randall, September 16, 1929 – June 9, 2022) was a female starting pitcher who played from 1948 through 1954 with the Fort Wayne Daisies of the All-American Girls Professional Baseball League (AAGPBL). Listed at 5 ft 7 in (1.70 m), 130 lb (59 kg), she batted and threw right-handed.

== Overview profile ==
Kline relied on a fastball–changeup combination, mixing in her curveball sparingly. A five-time member of the All-Star Team, she hurled two no-hitters, averaged 17 wins per season with a career-high, league-leading 23 in 1950, and again led all pitchers with 18 wins in 1954, during what turned out to be the AAGPBL's final season. She ranks third in the All-Time list with a .678 winning percentage and fifth with 116 wins. In three seasons her earned run average dropped below 2.00, for a cumulative 2.05 ERA in 1,518 innings of work.

== Early life ==
A native of North Adams, Michigan, Kline grew up in Addison. The daughter of German farmers, she had seven sisters and two brothers. Kline played softball while growing up and later attended North Adams High School, where she led the basketball team to three undefeated seasons. She later attended an AAGPBL tryout in Fort Wayne, Indiana and earned a contract to play with the local Daisies, joining the team after her graduation in 1948.

== AAGPBL career ==
Initially playing with a softball, the All-American Girls Professional Baseball League eventually employed a regulation baseball, with overhand pitching permitted starting in 1948. This innovation did not disrupt Kline, unlike many pitchers in the league. She started her career at outfield, but was promoted to a Daisies pitching staff riddled with injuries to take advantage of her strong throwing arm. She shutout opponents in her first two starts, ending her rookie season with an 8–13 record and a 2.25 ERA.

Kline had a 14–11 mark overall in 1949, including a no-hitter against the Grand Rapids Chicks on June 12 of that year. Her most productive season came in 1950 when she paced the circuit with her career top 23 wins for only nine losses. She made the All-Star Team for the initial time, and also collected career numbers in strikeouts (87) and pitching appearances (33) while posting a .719 winning percentage and 2.44 ERA. Her winning percentage was even better in 1951 as she went 18-4 (.818). In addition, she earned her second All-Star berth.

In 1952, Kline threw six shutouts en route to a 19–7 record and her third All-Star selection. She dropped to 16–14 in 1953 but again joined the All-Star squad. In the league's hitting-dominated last season in 1954, she led all pitchers in wins (18), appearances (28), complete games (24), innings (181) and shutouts (6), while recording her second no-hitter on June 20, once again against the Grand Rapids Chicks. She once hurled a 17-inning shutout against the Chicks. For the fifth consecutive year, she became an All-Star.

While the Daisies made the playoffs in the seven seasons that Kline pitched for them, the team struggled during the postseason and never won a league championship. From 1947 to 1951, Fort Wayne was eliminated in the opening round, being knocked out by the South Bend Blue Sox in 1952 and the Grand Rapids Chicks in 1953, after posting the best regular-season record. In what became the final season in 1954, the Daisies disposed of Grand Rapids and South Bend in the playoffs, advancing to the Championship Series to face the Kalamazoo Lassies, but were beaten in the decisive Game 5 as the league closed.

Some baseball researchers consider Kline one of the five best pitchers in All-American Girls Professional Baseball League history, along with Jean Faut, Helen Nicol, Dottie Wiltse and Connie Wisniewski.

== Bill Allington All-Stars ==
Once the league folded, Kline joined several other players selected by former Daisies manager Bill Allington to play for the national touring team known as the All-Americans. The squad played 100 games from 1955 to 1957, each booked in a different town, against male teams, while traveling over 10,000 miles in the manager's station wagon and a Ford Country Sedan. Besides Kline, the Allington All-Stars included players such as Joan Berger, Gloria Cordes, Jeanie Descombes, Gertrude Dunn, Betty Foss, Mary Froning, Jean Geissinger, Katie Horstman, Dolores Lee, Magdalen Redman, Ruth Richard, Dorothy Schroeder, Jean Smith, Dolly Vanderlip and Joanne Weaver, among others.

== Private life ==
In 1973 Kline married Robert Randall, whom she met while working for Jonesville Automotive Products in North Adams. Retired, but very active, she played in the AAGPBL reunion game in 1984, where she belted a home run. As of 2000, she lived on the family farm in Hillsdale, ten miles from her birthplace.

== Pitching statistics ==
GP	W	L	W-L%	ERA	IP	H	R	ER	BB	SO	WHIP	SO/BB
196	116	65	.678	2.05	1518	1244	538	394	389	495	1.0757	1.27
