= Sarah Jane Ferguson =

Salty Ferguson
- Right fielder / Catcher
- Born: Sarah Jane Sands; July 27, 1935 (age 90); Orangeville, Pennsylvania, U.S.
- Bats: right Throws: right

Teams
- Rockford Peaches (1953–1954)

Sarah Jane "Salty" Ferguson (née Sands; born July 27, 1935) is a former right fielder and catcher who played from 1953 through 1954 in the All-American Girls Professional Baseball League (AAGPBL). Listed at 5 ft 4 in (1.63 m), 120 lb., she batted and threw right-handed.

== Summary ==
=== Playing career ===
The AAGPBL was founded in 1943 by Philip K. Wrigley, who was in charge both of the Wrigley Company and the Chicago Cubs Major League Baseball club. Wrigley decided to create the league as a promotional sideline to maintain interest in baseball. By then, the military draft was depleting Major League rosters of first-line players and attendance declined at ballparks around the country. Arthur Meyerhoff, Wrigley's advertising director, was given the responsibility of coordinating operations. The AAGPBL lasted twelve seasons before folding in 1954, when other interests and forms of recreation began to claim the attention of sport fanatics. The circuit was owned by Wrigley only from 1943 to 1945, and by Meyerhoff from 1945 to 1951. The clubs were then individually owned from 1951 to 1954.

A native of Orangeville, Pennsylvania, Sands had her first contact with baseball at the age of four when her father took her to a ball game. She grew up playing sandlot ball with neighborhood kids, most of them boys, at an early age, but did not start participating in organized baseball until she was 14. At this time, she became the proud batgirl of the 1949 Orangeville semi-professional baseball team. Before each game, she also practiced correctly the fundamentals of the game, chasing fly balls, fielding grounders, and acting as warming up catcher. In her senior year, Sands told everyone who would listen that she was going to grow up and play professional baseball. She found that when the high school coach allowed her to practice with the boys' team. Her dream finally came true in the fall of 1952, when her father talked to an AAGPBL scout about setting up a meeting with his daughter. She was invited to a tryout, where she passed the test and was rewarded with a contract to play in the league.

Sands was sent to the Rockford Peaches, a team managed by Johnny Rawlings, who taught her the finer points of playing and having fun while doing it. Her love of the game was so strong that she moved to right field after learning the position of catcher was filled by perennial All-Star Ruth Richard, whom she backed up as needed. In my two seasons as a pro, I caught just 12 games. The first year I got to play 76 of 110 games. The second year, despite injuries, I got into 60 games. I feel that I learned quite a bit while riding the bench, too, she explained. Rockford finished fourth in the league with a 51–55 mark in 1953. Further, the Peaches lost to the Grand Rapids Chicks in the first round of the playoffs, two to one games. In 1954 Rockford ended 37–55, out of contention.

=== After her retirement ===
Following her playing retirement, Sands continued to be involved in baseball, from Little League coach to women's softball, to keep her love of the game going. She also has been an active collaborator of the AAGPBL Players Association since its foundation in 1987. The association was largely responsible for the opening of a permanent display at the Baseball Hall of Fame and Museum in Cooperstown, New York since November 5, 1988 that honors those who were part of this experience. Sands was among the 61 former players who were in Cooperstown for 10 days of filming for the Penny Marshall's film. The AAGPBL veterans played on Doubleday Field in the final scene scored to Madonna's song This Used to be My Playground.

In 2003, Sands was inducted into her alma mater Bloomsburg High School's Graduates of Distinction Hall of Fame. She also was asked to throw the ceremonial first pitch to the USA Olympic Softball team during the squad's visit to Williamsport in 2007. In addition, she sat on the panel on two Society for American Baseball Research meetings celebrated in 1974 and 1995. I am truly blessed! The good Lord gave me the love of baseball and the talent to play. I had a dream and God intervened and made it possible. Now it's my turn to repay that debt, she said.

Sands returned to Cooperstown in March 2010, when the Hall of Fame authorities invited her for a celebration of Women's History Month. As of 2010 she was living in Orangeville, Pennsylvania.

== Statistics ==
Batting

GP	AB	R	H	2B	3B	HR	RBI	SB	BB	SO	BA
136	414	37	87	5	0	1	29	9	13	48	.210

Fielding

GP	PO	A	E	TC	DP	FA
133	169	27	14	TC	210	.933
