= Jeanie Descombes =

- Pitcher
- Born: March 28, 1935 (age 90); Springfield, Ohio, U.S.
- Bats: Left Throws: Left

Teams
- Grand Rapids Chicks (1953–1954)

Career highlights and awards
- Championship Team (1953)

Jeneane Descombes Lesko (born March 28, 1935) is a former pitcher who played from 1953 through 1954 in the All-American Girls Professional Baseball League (AAGPBL). Listed at 5 ft 5 in (1.65 m), 135 lb., she batted and threw left-handed. She played under the name of Jeanie (or Jean) Descombes.

== Early life ==
Born in Springfield, Ohio, Descombes pitched in the All-American Girls Professional Baseball League during its final two years of continuation. She had no playing participation before entering the league, but she had been involved actively in the game since she was in school.

"I actually had no pitching participation and had never played organized baseball... I had practiced baseball with our school team all through high school, but of course, they would not let me play in the games. I was also the batgirl for our town team of men and practiced with them and went to all the games. I loved the game and had a strong arm", she recalled in her autobiography.

== AAGPBL career ==
Descombes joined the league in 1953 with the Grand Rapids Chicks. "My coach and friend was 'Beansie' Risinger" (pitcher Earlene Risinger), she said. At first, Grand Rapids manager Woody English let her pitch batting practice, but most of the time she had her running in the outfield, practicing until about midseason before getting her first chance to pitch. Expanding her comments about Risinger, Descombes explained that she taught her to relax and believe in herself.

In her rookie season, Descombes posted a 0–1 record with a 7.45 earned run average in seven relief appearances and was a member of the Champion Team, even though she did not pitch during the postseason. In her final season of 1954, Descombes collected a 10–9 record and a 5.00 ERA in 22 appearances, tying for eight place in the league for the most wins while ending fifth in strikeouts (63). She also helped herself with the bat, going 7-for-39 for a .179 average.

== Bill Allington All-Stars ==
When the league was unable to continue in 1955, Descombes joined several other players selected by former Fort Wayne Daisies manager Bill Allington to play in the national touring team known as the All-Americans All-Stars. The team played 100 games, each booked in a different town, against male teams, while traveling over 10,000 miles in the manager's station wagon and a Ford Country Sedan. Besides Descombes, the Allington All-Stars included players as Joan Berger, Gloria Cordes, Gertrude Dunn, Betty Foss, Mary Froning, Jean Geissinger, Katie Horstman, Maxine Kline, Dolores Lee, Magdalen Redman, Ruth Richard, Dorothy Schroeder, Jean Smith, Dolly Vanderlip and Joanne Weaver, among others.

== Life after baseball ==
In 1957, Descombes earned degrees in sciences and mathematics from Ohio Northern University. Then she signed up to teach dependent children at Ramey Air Force Base near Aguadilla, Puerto Rico, where she stayed for four years and learned to play golf. In 1962 she flew to France and taught girls physical education in Laon, being transferred to Châteauroux a year later. While in France, she took golf lessons from an English professional golfer who played during Bobby Jones’ era. She later received an opportunity to transfer in 1965 to the Clark Air Force Base in the Philippine Islands and returned to the United States in 1967, after deciding she wanted to become a professional golfer.

Descombes spent 1968 playing golf in Grass Valley, California. After establishing an excellent four handicap she joined the LPGA. She then competed in U.S. Women's Open tournaments at Oregon, California, Florida and Minnesota. Besides her baseball and golf interests, she also officiated basketball, volleyball and softball. In 2003, she started the Washington State Women's Baseball Association and coached and served on the board during eight years. In the interim, she became a real estate agent.

Descombes played on a senior softball team and spent much of her time supporting women in sports, balancing her time between her business venture, a real estate school in Bellevue, Washington, as well as her duties for the vision and website committees of the AAGPBL Players Association. The association was largely responsible for the opening of Women in Baseball, a permanent display at the Baseball Hall of Fame and Museum at Cooperstown, New York, which was unveiled in 1988 to honor the entire All-American Girls Professional Baseball League rather than individual baseball personalities. Descombes is still traveling as a supporter for the aforementioned exhibition internationally.

== Pitching statistics ==
GP	W	L	W-L%	ERA	IP	H	RA	ER	BB	SO
29	10	9	.526	5.31	134	140	94	79	94	68
