= Dolores Lee =

American baseball player

- Pitcher
- Born: April 21, 1935; Jersey City, New Jersey, U.S.
- Died: May 14, 2014 (aged 79); Deming, New Mexico, U.S.
- Batted: Right Threw: Right

debut
- 1952

Last appearance
- 1954

Teams
- Rockford Peaches (1952–1954)

Career highlights and awards
- Rookie of the Year Award (1952); Two playoff appearances (1952-'53)

Dolores Margaret Lee (April 21, 1935 – May 14, 2014) was an American female baseball player who played as a pitcher from 1952 through 1954 in the All-American Girls Professional Baseball League (AAGPBL). Listed at 5 ft 6 in (1.68 m), 130 lb, she batted and threw right-handed.

Lee pitched in the last three years of the All-American Girls Professional Baseball League. She is known to have a strong pitching arm and also was a defender at second base. Her accomplishments included winning the Rookie of the Year Award and playing in the All-American touring team organized and piloted by Bill Allington. Known to her teammates and other players as a colorful and funny figure, Lee was commonly named Pickles — a substitute name she picked up back home because some people could not remember her name, as she recalled in an interview. In addition, she would surprise fanatics by pitching two balls simultaneously to two different catchers.

== Early life ==
A native of Jersey City, New Jersey, where she played baseball with her brothers and the other boys in the streets of her neighborhood. Like many youths of her generation, she also played stickball and basketball with the boys before playing competitively at age 12 for the Santora's Village Boys ballclub. She was discovered while still attending St. Dominic Academy in Jersey City. Though her school had no sports for girls, the local area provided a wide range of opportunities through the Catholic Youth Organization leagues. Lee played from 1948 to 1952 for the St. Paul's basketball team, and also spent five years with the Garfield Flashettes, a team managed by Slim Berger, father of AAGPBL player Joan Berger. Manager Berger, who also scouted for the AAGPBL, recommended Lee to the league's tryouts when she turned 16. She tried out, received a contract offer, but went back home to finish high school. Finally, Lee entered the league in 1952 after graduating from high school. She was allocated to the Racine Belles, a team managed by the aforementioned Bill Allington.

== AAGPBL career ==
Lee posted a 1–2 record in five games for Rockford in 1952 and was named Rookie of the Year. Because of that honor, she was eventually invited to the television program What's My Line? prior to the start of the 1954 season. The Peaches finished in third place with a 55–54 mark, being swept in two games by the Fort Wayne Daisies during the first round of the playoffs.

In 1953 Lee posted career-numbers in wins (12), percentage (.545) and games pitched (26), while Rockford, now with Johnny Rawlings at the helm, ended in fourth place (51–55) and advanced to the playoffs. The Peaches lost in first round to the Grand Rapids Chicks, two to one games.

Lee went 10–10 with a career-high 94 strikeouts in 1954, during what turned out to be the league's final season. Rockford finished last in the five-team circuit with a 37–55 record. Despite the disappointing result, the Peaches were the most successful team in the AAGPBL during its twelve years history, winning their first championship title in 1945 and three consecutive titles from 1948 to 1950. The Peaches also were one of just two teams to be active in every season the league existed. The South Bend Blue Sox were the other.

== Bill Allington All-Stars ==
Following her AAGPBL career, Lee joined several other players on Bill Allington's All-American team, a barnstorming remnant of the league. Allington formed the squad and worked with agent Matt Pascale of Omaha, Nebraska. The Allington All-Stars played 100 games between 1955 and 1958, each booked in a different town, against male teams, while traveling over 10,000 miles in the manager's station wagon and a Ford Country Sedan. The girls played exhibition games with men's teams but sometimes exchanged pitchers and catchers so that men batted against men and the girls against girls. Before each game, the girls put on a 20 to 30 minute exhibition. The baseball fanatics, even skeptics who were not were ready to admit that women could be athletes, were greatly impressed by the ball-handling skills displayed by the girls during infield practice.

Dolores Lee, who divided her playing time between pitching and third base, startled the public with a stunning throwing demonstration. She would position two catchers at home plate, one in each batter's box, and wind up and throw two balls simultaneously, nearly always hurling perfect strikes. On some occasions, Lee would stand at the plate and throw two balls toward second base, one to be caught by the second base defender and the other by the shortstop.

While playing third base in a game in Minneapolis, I threw the ball to first base the way I pitched, right over the top... Just then, Eddie Stanky came running out onto the field and shook my hand. He said, ‘I sure wish ... you were a guy', Lee explained. It happened in 1956, at Nicollet Park, when Stanky managed the Minneapolis Millers minor league team.

But the girls were always coming up with new gimmicks. The speedy Joanne Weaver raced a horse from left field to home plate on numerous occasions, just with only a modest head start. We were young, Lee said when asked about the life on the road. We did not know any better. We were having fun playing ball. We certainly were not doing it for the money, she added. The Allington All-Stars would frequently travel several hundreds miles between games and slept five of six girls to a motel room. By today's standards, it was a rough schedule. Besides this, they shared receipts after paying expenses and Pascale's and Allington's shares. For most games, the girls were paid $10 or less. Their most significant performance came on July 17 of 1957, when they played before 5,719 fans in a three-inning exhibition against the St. Paul Saints before a regular American Association game at Midway Stadium. Besides Lee and Weaver, the Allington All-Stars included players as Joan Berger, Gloria Cordes, Jeanie Descombes, Gertrude Dunn, Betty Foss, Mary Froning, Jean Geissinger, Katie Horstman, Maxine Kline, Magdalen Redman, Ruth Richard, Dorothy Schroeder, Jean Smith and Dolly Vanderlip, between others.

== Life after baseball ==
Following her baseball career, Lee became the first female police officer in New Jersey when she joined the Jersey City police department in 1958. She married fellow officer Johannes Dries Jr. in 1963. They had one son, Johannes Dries III, and divorced in 1971.

In 1995 Lee was inducted in the Hudson County Athletic Hall of Fame for her achievements in baseball. She also became part of the AAGPBL permanent display at the Baseball Hall of Fame and Museum at Cooperstown, New York, opened in 1988, which is dedicated to the entire league rather than any individual player. She lived in Deming, New Mexico. She died at 79 on May 14, 2014.

== Pitching statistics ==
GP	W	L	W-L%	ERA	IP	RA	ER	BB	SO
53	23	22	.511	3.01	352	177	124	168	130
