= Joan Berger =

American baseball player (1933–2021)

- Infield / Outfield
- Born: October 9, 1933; Passaic, New Jersey, U.S.
- Died: September 11, 2021 (aged 87)
- Batted: Right Threw: Right

Teams
- Rockford Peaches (1951–1954)

Career highlights and awards
- All-Star Team (1952); Rookie of the Year Award (1952); Three playoff appearances (1951-'53); Women in Baseball – AAGPBL Permanent Display Baseball Hall of Fame and Museum (1988)

Joan Berger [Knebl] (October 9, 1933 – September 11, 2021) was an infielder and outfielder who played from 1951 through 1954 in the All-American Girls Professional Baseball League (AAGPBL). Listed at 5 ft 4 in (1.63 m), 132 lb, she batted and threw right-handed. She was born in Passaic, New Jersey.

An All-Star at second base, Joan Berger played in the last four seasons of the All-American Girls Professional Baseball League. Her accomplishments also included winning the Rookie of the Year Award and playing in the All-American touring team piloted by Bill Allington.

== Early life ==
Reflecting on her early influences, Berger explained that her father Slim Berger was a semiprofessional baseball player who helped her learn to play the game. My father was a great sportsman, he used to take me to all his games and I went in the field during his practices. Her father later formed the Garfield Flashettes, which became the first girls' softball team based in Garfield, New Jersey. Berger joined her father's team when she was in eighth grade, and tried out for the AAGPBL as a sophomore at Garfield High School, but she was too young to join the league. She attended to a new tryout the next year, but her father advised her to wait until the next year. Finally, Berger joined the league in 1951 after graduating from high school. She was allocated to the Rockford Peaches, a team managed by the aforementioned Bill Allington.

== AAGPBL ==
Berger entered the league as a right fielder, hitting a .251 average in only 40 games. At this point, she maintained her rookie status for the following season. In 1952 she switched to second base, won Rookie of the Year honors, and was the only rookie to make the All-Star Team. The next season she played shortstop and second, splitting her playing time between third base and second in 1954, when she hit a career-high .280 during what turned out to be the league's final season. Rockford made the playoffs from 1951 to 1953 but failed to win the championship.

== Allington All-Stars ==
Following her AAGPBL career, Berger joined several other players on Bill Allington's All-American team, a barnstorming remnant of the league. The Allington All-Stars played 100 games between 1954 and 1958, each booked in a different town, against male teams, while traveling over 10,000 miles in the manager's station wagon and a Ford Country Sedan. Besides Berger, the Allington All-Stars included players as Gloria Cordes, Jeanie Descombes, Gertrude Dunn, Betty Foss, Mary Froning, Jean Geissinger, Katie Horstman, Maxine Kline, Dolores Lee, Magdalen Redman, Ruth Richard, Dorothy Schroeder, Jean Smith, Dolly Vanderlip and Joanne Weaver, among others.

== Personal life ==
Berger married Andrew Knebl in 1959 and settled down to raise a family. She had three boys, Andrew Jr., Kevin and Robert, and has five granddaughters. She worked for Ferrero USA for eight years and retired in 1994.

She was part of the AAGPBL permanent display at the Baseball Hall of Fame and Museum at Cooperstown, New York, opened in 1988, which is dedicated to the entire league rather than any individual player. She lived in Lodi, New Jersey.

Berger died on September 11, 2021, at the age of 87.

== Statistics ==
Batting

GP	AB	R	H	2B	3B	HR	RBI	SB	BB	SO	BA	OBP	SLG
345	1192	173	298	27	12	4	98	78	119	75	.250	.318	.303

Fielding

PO	A	E	TC	DP	FA
374	542	96	1012	60	.905
