= Dolly Vanderlip =

- Pitcher
- Born: June 4, 1937 (age 88); Charlotte, North Carolina, U.S.
- Bats: Right Throws: Right

Teams
- Fort Wayne Daisies (1952–1953); South Bend Blue Sox (1954)

Career highlights and awards
- Championship team (1953)

Dolly Vanderlip [Ozburn] (born June 4, 1937) is a former pitcher who played from 1952 through 1954 in the All-American Girls Professional Baseball League (AAGPBL). Listed at 5 ft 8 in (1.73 m), 140 lb., Vanderlip batted and threw right-handed. She was born in Charlotte, North Carolina.

At first, Vanderlip attended a tryout for the league in 1950 at the age of 13. She signed a contract with the Fort Wayne Daisies the next year, and debuted with the team on June 5, 1952, one day after her 15th birthday, under Jimmie Foxx management.

== AAGPBL career ==
"Lippy", as her teammates nicknamed her, started her career as a relief pitcher before becoming a starter. In her rookie season, she pitched 10 games and went 0–4 with a 3.93 earned run average in 39 innings of work. She improved to a 2–2 record and a 2.88 ERA in 1953, appearing in 14 games while pitching 50 innings. Fort Wayne, with Bill Allington at the helm, won the league's title, but lost to the Kalamazoo Lassies in the first round playoffs. She posted a 3.00 ERA in two playoff appearances, working two innings, but did not have a decision.

In 1954, with the South Bend Blue Sox, manager Karl Winsch turned Vanderlip into a starter. In 19 starts, she finished with an 11–6 record in a high-career 120 innings. Her 2.80 ERA was the second best in the league, being surpassed only by teammate Janet Rumsey, who finished with a 2.13 ERA. Vanderlip also finished fifth in winning percentage (.647), sixth in wins, and tied for third for the most shutouts (4).

== Bill Allington All-Stars ==
When the league was unable to continue in 1955, Vanderlip joined several other players selected by former Fort Wayne Daisies manager Bill Allington to play in the national touring team known as the All-Americans All-Stars. The team played 100 games, each booked in a different town, against male teams, while traveling over 10,000 miles in the manager's station wagon and a Ford Country Sedan. Besides Vanderlip, the Allington All-Stars included players as Joan Berger, Gloria Cordes, Jeanie Descombes, Gertrude Dunn, Betty Foss, Mary Froning, Jean Geissinger, Katie Horstman, Maxine Kline, Dolores Lee, Magdalen Redman, Ruth Richard, Dorothy Schroeder, Jean Smith and Joanne Weaver, among others.

== Life after baseball ==
Vanderlip met her future husband Clement Ozburn during the tour. They married in 1958 and had two children. She went on to college and earned three degrees while attending Appalachian State University, the University of Iowa and the University of Wisconsin–La Crosse. She is part of Women in Baseball, a permanent display based at the Baseball Hall of Fame and Museum in Cooperstown, New York, which was unveiled in 1988 to honor the entire All-American Girls Professional Baseball League.

== Career statistics ==
Pitching

GP	W	L	W-L%	ERA	IP	H	RA	ER	BB	SO	WP	HBP	WHIP
43	13	12	.520	2.80	209	187	104	65	132	64	7	4	1.53

Batting

GP	AB	R	H	2B	3B	HR	RBI	SB	BB	SO	BA	OBP
43	69	7	9	0	0	0	7	0	14	19	.130	.277

Fielding

GP	PO	A	E	TC	DP	FA
43	16	96	9	121	1	.926
