= Mary Froning =

- Outfield
- Born: August 26, 1934; Minster, Ohio, U.S.
- Died: November 2, 2014 (aged 80); Madison, Wisconsin, U.S.
- Batted: Right Threw: Right

Teams
- South Bend Blue Sox (1951–1954); Battle Creek Belles (1951)

Career highlights and awards
- Two championship teams (1951–1952); Women in Baseball – AAGPBL Permanent Display at Baseball Hall of Fame and Museum (1988)

Mary Froning (later O'Meara; August 26, 1934 – November 2, 2014) was an outfielder who played from 1951 through 1954 in the All-American Girls Professional Baseball League (AAGPBL). Listed at 5 ft 3 in (1.60 m), 118 lb., she batted and threw right-handed.

A strong-armed outfielder and speedy base runner, Mary Froning played on two championship teams during the last four years of that league.

== Early life ==
Froning was born in Minster, Ohio, a tiny village located 54 miles (87 km) from Dayton, Ohio. At age 16, she enjoyed the life outdoors swimming, riding her bike, and eventually playing a Sunday softball game for a Catholic Youth Organization team, where she played at shortstop. An AAGPBL talent scout spotted Froning when she was playing an afternoon softball game. He saw that she had speed and a strong throwing arm and invited her to a tryout. Her parents took her to her first tryout, in South Bend, Indiana, because of her age. There were over 100 girls trying out for five roster spots in the local team, and Froning got one of them. A short time later, she received a contract offer from the South Bend Blue Sox. The offer was $50 a month and expenses. My dad and I looked at it," she explained in an interview, and saw that it was for baseball, not softball. She joined the team and her parents arranged for a room for her in a private home in South Bend. It was 1951, and the young girl was on her way to what she later called the most enjoyable four years of my life.

== AAGPBL career ==
In 1951, the Blue Sox hired a new manager, Karl Winsch, a former pitching prospect of the Philadelphia Phillies and husband of Jean Faut, the team's ace pitcher. South Bend also had a surplus of talent, so Froning did not see much action and was loaned briefly to the Battle Creek Belles.

In 1952 Froning finally had a chance to play regularly after six players left the team in a dispute with Winsch. Just before the regular season ended, he suspended the flashy Charlene Pryer for not going in to pinch-run quickly when asked, which created an uproar after the game. That night at the team's hotel, several Blue Sox veterans talked the situation over. As a result, Barbara Hoffman, Elizabeth Mahon, Jane Stoll and Shirley Stovroff, among others, quit the team in support of Pryer. Then, Froning was one of only 11 players who helped South Bend clinch their second consecutive championship title.

The Blue Sox broke up in 1953. They traded a bunch of players, Froning recalled. She became an everyday outfielder during the last two seasons before the league folded in 1954, splitting duties at center field and right field. Eventually, she was used as an emergency pitcher.

Froning appeared in a career-high 108 games in 1953, collecting a .108 average and a .295 on-base percentage. She also posted career numbers in runs scored (50) and RBI (26), while her 32 stolen bases ranked for the tenth best in the league.

In 1954 Froning hit .234 with three home runs and 44 RBI, tying for fifth in stolen bases (26), while managing to place second for the most outfield assists (20), being surpassed only by Kalamazoo Lassies' Jenny Romatowski (24).

== Bill Allington All-Stars ==
Once the league disbanded in 1954, Mary Froning was one of the players selected by former Fort Wayne Daisies manager Bill Allington to play in the national touring team known as the All-Americans. The Allington All-Stars played 100 games between 1954 and 1958, each booked in a different town, against male teams, while traveling over 10,000 miles in the manager's station wagon and a Ford Country Sedan. Besides Froning, the All-Americans included Joan Berger, Gloria Cordes, Jeanie Descombes, Gertrude Dunn, Betty Foss, Jean Geissinger, Katie Horstman, Maxine Kline, Dolores Lee, Magdalen Redman, Ruth Richard, Jean Smith, Dorothy Schroeder, Dolly Vanderlip and Joanne Weaver, among others.

== Life after baseball ==
In 1956, Froning became a stewardess for American Airlines along with her twin sister, Martha, until she married Tom O'Meara in 1958 and moved to Madison, Wisconsin. They raised four children, Kathy, Susan, John and Patricia, and had six grand children, all boys.

She is part of Women in Baseball, a permanent display based at the Baseball Hall of Fame and Museum in Cooperstown, New York, which was unveiled in 1988 to honor the entire All-American Girls Professional Baseball League.

Besides this, in 2003 she was invited to throw the ceremonial first pitch at a Milwaukee Brewers home game against the Chicago Cubs. After the ceremony, she was honored by having her name added to the Wall of Honor inside Miller Park, home of the Brewers.

Mary never lost her love of sports and played softball and coached in Madison until 1998. Staying active after retirement, she enjoyed being with her family and playing tennis and golf in her spare time. She died in November 2014 at the age of 80.

== Career statistics ==
Batting

GP	AB	R	H	2B	3B	HR	RBI	SB	TB	BB	SO	BA	OBP	SLG
209	651	95	138	18	0	3	56	58	165	62	73	.212	.307	.253

Fielding

GP	PO	A	E	TC	DP	FA
204	239	34	22	295	3	.925

Pitching

GP	W	L	W-L%	ERA	IP	H	RA	ER	BB	SO
6	1	2	.333	6.02	13	10	14	8	16	4
