= Betty Francis =

- Corner outfielder
- Born: July 7, 1931; Maquoketa, Iowa, U.S.
- Died: January 30, 2016 (aged 84); Merrionette Park, Illinois, U.S.
- Batted: Right Threw: Right

Teams
- Chicago Colleens (1949); Muskegon Lassies (1949); Kalamazoo Lassies (1950–1953); South Bend Blue Sox (1954)

Career highlights and awards
- Two postseason appearances (1953–1954); Women in Baseball – AAGPBL Permanent Display at Baseball Hall of Fame and Museum (1988)

Betty Francis [″BF″] (July 7, 1931 – January 30, 2016) was an American baseball outfielder who played from 1949 through 1954 in the All-American Girls Professional Baseball League (AAGPBL). Listed at 5 ft 4 in (1.63 m), 140 lb., she batted and threw right-handed.

Born in Maquoketa, Iowa, the stocky Betty Francis played during the last six seasons of the All-American Girls Professional Baseball League.

Francis was a contact hitter with extra base power, compiling a 2.73 walk-to-strikeout ratio while connecting 50 of her 331 career hits for extra bases. She also provided defense in both outfield corners.

Francis first played for the Chicago Colleens rookie development team in 1949. She was promoted to the Muskegon Lassies late in the season, and stayed with the franchise when it was renamed the Kalamazoo Lassies.

Francis played for the Lassies five years, before joining the South Bend Blue Sox in 1954. Her most productive season was with South Bend, when she posted career-numbers in batting average (.350), runs scored (49), home runs (8), runs batted in (58), hits (105) and doubles (12). She had the fifth highest average among all players, while ranking seventh for the most doubles and eighth in RBI .

When her baseball days were over, Francis moved to Chicago, Illinois and worked during 28 years in the Libby's canning company. She also played professional softball in Chicago, accumulating 14 years of amateur ball and 17 years as a professional.

In 1988, Betty Francis became part of Women in Baseball, a permanent display based at the Baseball Hall of Fame and Museum in Cooperstown, New York, which was unveiled to honor the entire All-American Girls Professional Baseball League.

== Career statistics ==
Batting

GP	AB	R	H	2B	3B	HR	RBI	SB	TB	BB	SO	BA	OBP	SLG
429	1318	157	331	38	3	9	125	42	402	185	76	.251	.343	.305

Fielding

GP	PO	A	E	TC	DP	FA
379	438	55	38	531	7	.929
