= Jean Geissinger =

- Infielder / Center fielder
- Born: June 25, 1934; Huntingdon, Pennsylvania, U.S.
- Died: June 8, 2014 (aged 79); Kalamazoo, Michigan, U.S.
- Batted: Right Threw: Right

Teams
- Fort Wayne Daisies (1951–1952 [start], 1953–1954); Grand Rapids Chicks (1952 [end])

Career highlights and awards
- Two-time All-Star Team (1953–1954); Two-time runs batted in leader (1953–1954); Northeast Indiana Baseball Hall of Fame (2005); Women in Baseball – AAGPBL Permanent Display at Baseball Hall of Fame and Museum (1988)

Jean Louise Geissinger (later Harding; June 25, 1934 – June 8, 2014) was an American infielder and outfielder who played from 1951 through 1954 in the All-American Girls Professional Baseball League with the Fort Wayne Daisies (1951-1952 [start], 1953–1954) and the Grand Rapids Chicks (1952 [end]). Listed at 5 ft 6 in (1.68 m), 120 pounds (54 kg), she batted and threw right-handed.

== Career ==
″Dutch″, as she was dubbed by teammates, was born in Huntingdon, Pennsylvania to Richard and Lillian (Fagan) Geissinger. She was a versatile ballplayer, playing at second base and in all three outfield positions. She mainly played at center field and served also as an emergency relief pitcher. She has been considered as one of the top sluggers in AAGPBL history.

Geissinger led the AAGPBL hitters in runs batted in in 1953 (81) and 1954 (91), while finishing second for the batting crown with a .337 average in 1954. Besides, she was selected for the All-Star Team in both 1953 and 1954. In the 1953 contest, she finished it in style hitting a walk-off home run.

Though Geissinger played only four seasons, her .306 average ranks her third in the AAGPBL all-time list, being surpassed only by the sisters Joanne Weaver (.359) and Betty Weaver Foss (.342), while her 41 homers ranks her fourth behind Eleanor Callow (55), Wilma Briggs (43) and Dorothy Schroeder (42).

When the league was unable to continue in 1955, Geissinger joined several other players selected by former Daisies manager Bill Allington to play in the national touring team known as the All-Americans All-Stars. The team played 100 games, each booked in a different town, against male teams, while traveling over 10,000 miles in the manager's station wagon and a Ford Country Sedan. Besides Geissinger, the Allington All-Stars included players as Joan Berger, Gloria Cordes, Jeanie Descombes, Gertrude Dunn, Betty Foss, Mary Froning, Katie Horstman, Maxine Kline, Dolores Lee, Magdalen Redman, Ruth Richard, Dorothy Schroeder, Jean Smith, Dolly Vanderlip and Joanne Weaver, among others.

== Family ==
While playing baseball, Geissinger met Russell Harding. They were married in 1959 and had three daughters, Ann, Karla and Jana. Following her baseball career, she worked at the Branch Intermediate School District of Coldwater, Michigan with special needs children. In addition, she joined a fast-pitch softball team, where she was known as "Dutch", and eventually stayed involved by coaching or umpiring games.

== Death and legacy ==
She is part of the AAGPBL permanent display at the Baseball Hall of Fame and Museum at Cooperstown, New York, opened in 1988, which is dedicated to the entire league rather than any individual player. After that, she gained induction into the Northeast Indiana Baseball Hall of Fame in 2005.

Jean Geissinger-Harding died in 2014 in Kalamazoo, Michigan, 17 days before her 80th birthday.

== AAGPBL batting statistics ==
Years	BA	GP	AB	R	H	2B	3B	HR	RBI	SB	TB	BB	SO	OBP	SLG	OPS
1951–1954	.306	328	1184	177	362	65	17	41	235	60	584	96	165	.358	.493	.851
