= Marguerite Pearson =

- Infield / Outfield / Pitcher
- Born: September 6, 1932; Pittsburgh, Pennsylvania, U.S.
- Died: January 4, 2005 (aged 72); Mount Pleasant, Michigan, U.S.
- Batted: Right Threw: Right
- Stats at Baseball Reference

Teams
- Muskegon Lassies (1948); Peoria Redwings (1949); Racine Belles (1950); Battle Creek Belles (1951); Kalamazoo Lassies (1951–1952); South Bend Blue Sox (1953); Grand Rapids Chicks (1954)

Career highlights and awards
- All-Star Team (1953)

Marguerite Pearson (Tesseine) (September 6, 1932 – January 4, 2005) was a utility player who played in the All-American Girls Professional Baseball League between the 1948 and 1954 seasons. Listed at 5 ft 5 in (1.65 m), 125 lb., Pearson batted and threw right-handed. She was nicknamed ″Dolly".

During her seven-year tenure in the AAGPBL, Dolly Pearson moved around for a while, playing for seven different clubs in seven different cities as the league shifted players as needed to help weak teams stay afloat. A versatile utility, she played all positions except catcher before becoming a regular shortstop. Pearson never had the opportunity to play for a pennant contender or a champion team.

After her baseball career was over, Pearson made a name for herself promoting youth sports activities to provide a safe and family-oriented environment on the field, which gained her induction in several Halls of Fame.

Born in the Pittsburgh, Pennsylvania neighborhood of Hazelwood, Pearson was the daughter of William and Retha (Hayes) Pearson. She was playing sandlot baseball with the boys and was gaining a reputation. And a AAGPBL scout caught wind, and signed Pearson at the age of 14 nearing 15, the youngest player ever to play in the league.

Pearson entered the league in 1948 with the Muskegon Lassies, playing for them for one year before joining the Peoria Redwings (1949), Racine Belles (1950), Battle Creek Belles (1951), Kalamazoo Lassies (1951–1952), South Bend Blue Sox (1953) and Grand Rapids Chicks (1954).

On the last day of her rookie season, Pearson celebrated her 16th birthday to everybody's surprise, because everyone thought she was already 16 (the minimum age according to the rules), so she had played illegally all year. In addition to Dolly, she also received one of the more unusual nicknames in the AAGPBL – "Buttons". Pearson received her curious nickname on a trip with the club, when she wanted to play with all the push-buttons in the train. Overall, Pearson appeared in 82 games and hit .182 with 15 runs and 12 RBI.

In 1949, Pearson batted .216 with Peoria, playing only in 30 games at various positions. At Racine the next year, she started at center field and posted a .235 average with 41 runs and 47 RBI in a career-high 110 games. Then in 1951 she found herself on the move again, this time to Battle Creek, where she started at shortstop, the position she would play for the rest of her career. In addition, she was sent to Kalamazoo in the midseason, combining for a .190 average in 100 games for both teams.

Pearson hit .185 in 44 games for Kalamazoo in 1952 and moved to South Bend in 1953. She appeared in 90 games for the Blue Sox, batting .185 with 29 RBI and 38 runs scored, being selected for the All-Star Team in 1953. Then she joined Grand Rapids in 1954, during what turned out to be the AAGPBL's final season. The league reduced the size of the ball 10 inches to major league size that year. As a result, Pearson started hitting the ball with authority and posted a .327 average w/272 at bats, 18 home runs, 10 stolen bases, a slugging percentage of .544, driving in 57 runs while scoring 68 times, setting career-marks. In 85 games, she committed 29 errors in 350 chances for a .917 fielding average.

Once the league folded, Dolly settled in Grand Rapids, Michigan for 15 years before moving to Mount Pleasant, Michigan. She started playing slow-pitch softball, playing until the age of 65, where her club won 18 championships. She married Edward Tesseine in 1955. The couple raised four children: Retha, Sam, Ron and Ed, and had five grandchildren; Taylon, Kaedria (Sam), Stacy, Rodney and Russell (Retha). She worked in the Central Michigan University athletics department for several years, while helping her husband run the bar they owned at Mount Pleasant, E.J.'s Lounge, until 1981.

Widowed in 1991, Pearson retired in 1994 and was involved in the Foster Grandparents Program. Children were always an integral part of her life, as she started the first T-ball program in Mt. Pleasant. She also trained and coached boys' baseball and girls' softball at various levels in the Michigan area, and coached senior girls' bowling for many years. She was the Grand Rapids, Michigan City Woman's singles' bowling Champion in 1968.

== Honors and awards ==
Since 1988 she is part of Women in Baseball, a permanent display based at the Baseball Hall of Fame and Museum in Cooperstown, New York, which was unveiled to honor the entire All-American Girls Professional Baseball League. She also gained inductions into the Grand Rapids Sports Hall of Fame, the Michigan Amateur Softball Association Hall of Fame, the Michigan State Softball Hall of Fame, and the Mount Pleasant Bowlers Hall of Fame.

Dolly Pearson died at her home in Mount Pleasant, Michigan at the age of 72.

== Career statistics ==
Batting

GP	AB	R	H	2B	3B	HR	RBI	SB	BB	SO	BA	OBP	SLG
541	1760	195	381	36	14	18	197	70	279	183	.216	.324	.284

Pitching

GP	W	L	W-L%	ERA	IP	H	RA	ER	BB	SO
5	0	2	.000	9.02	11	14	14	11	11	1

Fielding

GP	PO	A	E	TC	DP	FA
518	971	1121	201	2293	99	.912
