= Ruth Richard =

- Catcher
- Born: September 20, 1928; Sellersville, Pennsylvania, U.S.
- Died: May 6, 2018 (aged 89); Quakertown, Pennsylvania, U.S.
- Batted: Left Threw: Right

Teams
- Grand Rapids Chicks (1947); Rockford Peaches (1948–1954)

Career highlights and awards
- 6× AAGPBL All-Star Team (1949–1954); 4× AAGPBL champion (1947–1950)

Ruth Richard (September 20, 1928 – May 6, 2018) was an American baseball player who played as a catcher from 1947 through 1954 in the All-American Girls Professional Baseball League (AAGPBL). Listed at 5' 4", 134 lb., she batted left-handed and threw right-handed.

Richard spent eight seasons in the All-American Girls Professional Baseball League. A six-time All-Star, she also was a member of four champion teams. Richard made a transition from outfield to catcher, which enabled her to utilize her strong throwing arm more effectively, and she responded by gunning down more baserunners than any catcher in the league. Basically a line-drive hitter, she posted a .241 career batting average in 725 games, driving in 287 runs while scoring 237. As a catcher, she committed only 134 errors in 3,407 total chances for a .961 career fielding average.

== Early life ==
A native of Argus, Pennsylvania, Richard grew up on a family farm in the Ridge Valley Creek area and played softball for the Sellersville-Perkasie high school team. After graduating in 1946, she attended an AAGPBL tryout held in Allenton. She impressed by her throwing arm, range and potential.

== AAGPBL career ==
In 1947 she was allocated to the Grand Rapids Chicks, a team managed by former big leaguer Johnny Rawlings. That season the league moved its spring training camp to Havana, Cuba, and Richard was one of the two hundred girls who made the trip. The Chicks won the league title in 1947, with Richard patrolling 47 games at right field and making three appearances as relief pitcher.

Richard started 1948 with the Rockford Peaches, but the team turned her into a full-time catcher and she went on to have a solid career.

With Richard behind the plate, Rockford earned six playoff berths between 1948 and 1953, including three championship titles in a row from 1948 through 1950. In that year, she hit .251 for the Peaches but fractured an ankle in the season's final game and missed the playoffs, being replaced by Marilyn Jones.

Since 1949 Richard made six consecutive all-star squads until the folding of the league in 1954, in which she hit a career-high seven home runs. One of the most memorable experiences of her career came in 1949 while on an AAGPBL tour of Central and South America. The team was welcomed by both government officials and commoners. In Nicaragua, they visited the presidential palace and were greeted by the then President Anastasio Somoza.

== Allington All-Stars ==
Once the league disbanded, Richard toured with an All-Star team led by former Rockford manager Bill Allington. Several former AAGPBL players were selected by Allington to the national touring team known as the All-American All-Stars. The team played 100 games from 1954 through 1957, each booked in a different town, against male semi-pro teams, while the girls traveled over 10,000 miles in the manager's station wagon and a Ford Country Sedan. Besides Richard, the Allington All-Stars included players as Joan Berger, Gloria Cordes, Jeanie Descombes, Gertrude Dunn, Betty Foss, Mary Froning, Jean Geissinger, Katie Horstman, Maxine Kline, Dolores Lee, Magdalen Redman, Dorothy Schroeder, Jean Smith, Dolly Vanderlip and Joanne Weaver, among others.

== Life after baseball ==
Following her baseball career, Richard worked in AMETEK, Inc for 26 years until her retirement in 1993. Since then, she played amateur softball for a few seasons, and enjoyed travel, hunting, fishing, and playing golf.

In November 1988, Ruth Richard along with her former teammates and opponents, received their long overdue recognition when the Baseball Hall of Fame and Museum in Cooperstown, New York, dedicated a permanent display to the All American Girls Professional Baseball League. Richard, who never married, lived at her family homestead in Sellersville, Pennsylvania.

Richard died on May 6, 2018, at the age of 89.

== Batting statistics ==
GP	AB	R	H	2B	3B	HR	RBI	SB	BB	SO	BA	OBP	SLG
725	2518	237	608	67	20	15	287	72	142	109	.241	.282	.302

== Fielding statistics ==
PO	A	E	TC	DP	FA
2668	605	134	3314	41	.961
