= Jean Marlowe =

US baseball player

- Pitcher / Utility player
- Born: December 28, 1929; Scranton, Pennsylvania, U.S.
- Died: April 16, 2007 (aged 77); Olyphant, Pennsylvania, U.S.
- Batted: Right Threw: Right

Teams
- Springfield Sallies (1948); Kenosha Comets (1949–1951); Kalamazoo Lassies (1952, 1954)

Jean Marlowe [″Mal″ or ″Jeanie″] (December 28, 1929 – April 16, 2007) was a pitcher and utility who played in the All-American Girls Professional Baseball League between the 1948 and 1954 seasons. Listed a 5 ft 6 in (1.68 m), 135 lb., she batted and threw right-handed. Her last name is really Malanoski, but she acquired her last name in the league as a result of a misspelling.

Jean Marlowe went on to a six-season career in the All American Girls Professional Baseball League, primarily as a pitcher, while also seeing action at first base and second, as well at the outfield. She posted a 56–79 record with a solid 3.18 earned run average in 1075 innings pitched, a pretty good performance considering she played for most of her career for teams with bad defense, low run support and losing records. She was a member of the champion team in her last season, though she did not play in the series.

Born in Scranton, Pennsylvania, Jean was the daughter of Stanley and Josephine (née Kafchinski) Malanoski. At an early age, she learned to play sandlot ball with the backing of her father and uncle, who were professional ballplayers. She graduated from Scranton Central High School and later studied at the University of Wisconsin–Madison.

Marlowe learned about the league through a local newspaper and went to Allentown for a tryout with around 200 other girls. She tried out as an infielder and outfielder, but the league's trainers liked her strong throwing arm and converted her into a pitcher.

Marlowe joined the AAGPBL in 1948 with the Springfield Sallies. The Sallies inaugural season was nothing to write about. The team posted the worst record of the circuit, going 41–84 in the Western Division, getting roughed up as a last-place expansion club, ending 35 games out of the first place Racine Belles. At age nineteen, Marlowe became a stalwart of the helpless Sallies. She went 7–22 in 31 pitching appearances and led the league in losses, despite posting a 3.66 ERA.

She opened 1949 with the Kenosha Comets, playing regularly at outfield and pitching sporadically. Marlowe hit a .220 batting average in a career-high 98 games, driving in 17 runs and scoring 25 times while stealing 16 bases. She also compiled a 7–7 pitching record and improved her ERA to 2.67 in 17 games.

Her most productive season came in 1951, when she posted a 12–12 record in 28 games with career numbers in wins, ERA (2.62) and strikeouts (115), ending fourth for the most strikeouts, sixth in innings pitched (211) and tied for sixth in complete games (21).

Marlowe joined the Kalamazoo Lassies in 1952. That season she batted a .291 average and three home runs, both career numbers, and matched her season-high with 12 wins, though she was credited with 15 losses. She also compiled a 3.24 ERA and was the best fielding pitcher without an error committed in 172 innings of work. She did not play in 1953 but returned to Kalamazoo in 1954, during what turned out to be the league's final season. She went 8–12 with a 4.78 ERA in 23 pitching appearances.

After the league folded, Marlowe continued to play softball and worked for B.F. Goodrich Company. She later took a job with the Schott Glass Technologies and worked there until her retirement in 1987.

Marlowe is part of Women in Baseball, a permanent display at the Baseball Hall of Fame and Museum at Cooperstown, New York, which was unveiled in 1988 to honor the entire All-American Girls Professional Baseball League rather than any individual personality.

In 2002, she was among four baseball personalities to be inducted in the Pennsylvania Sports Hall of Fame. The others were Tom O'Malley, Ed Walsh and Bob Williams.

Jean Marlowe died in 2007, at age 77, at the Lackawanna County Health Care Center in Olyphant, Pennsylvania.

== Career statistics ==
Pitching

GP	W	L	W-L%	ERA	IP	H	RA	ER	BB	SO	WHIP	SO/BB
143	56	79	.415	3.18	1075	840	474	337	450	423	1.20	0.94

Batting

GP	AB	R	H	2B	3B	HR	RBI	SB	TB	BB	SO	BA	OBP	SLG
314	838	83	167	17	6	7	68	28	217	117	166	.199	.297	.259

Fielding

GP	PO	A	E	TC	DP	FA
314	347	348	38	733	13	.971
