= Ford Country Sedan =

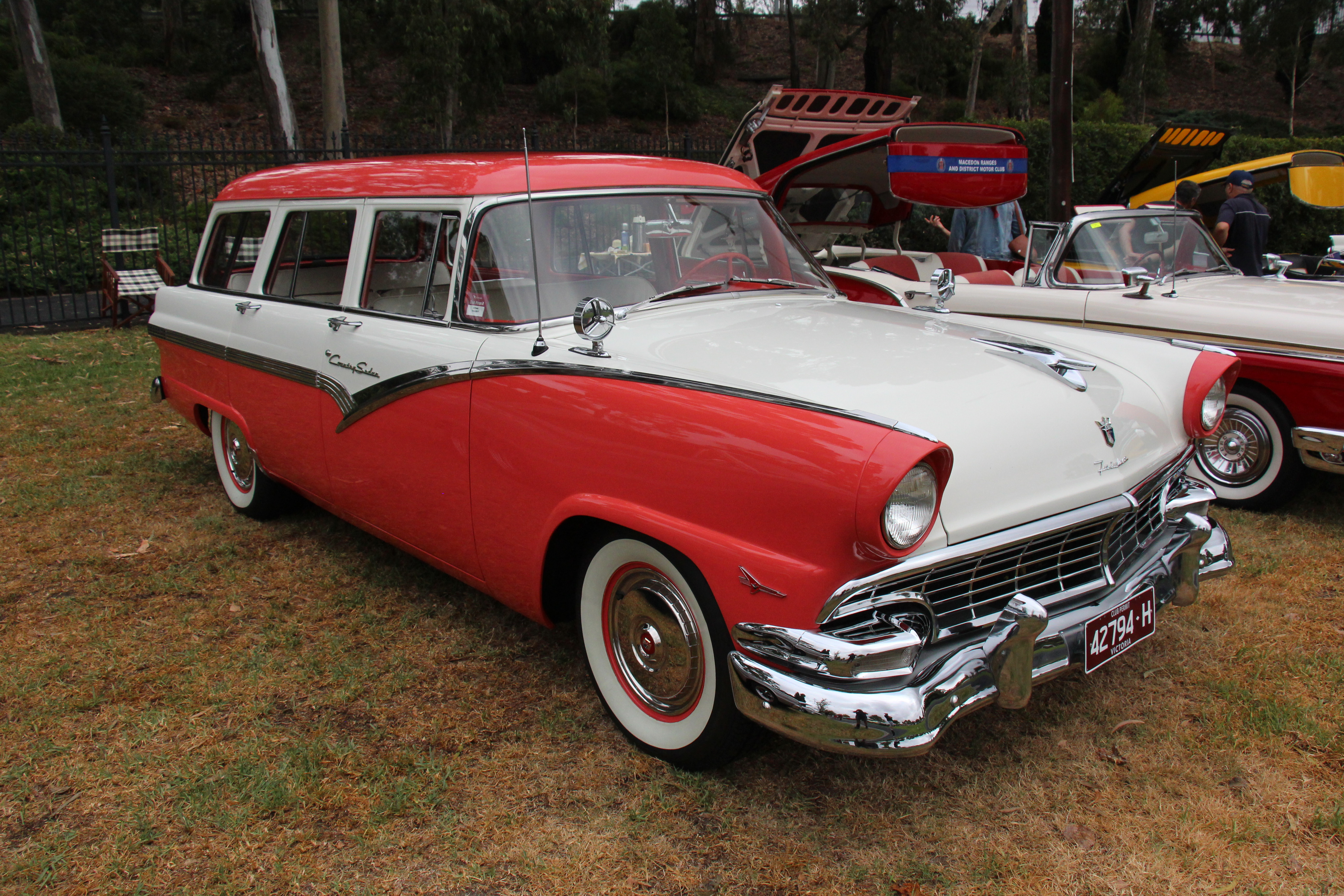
- 1956 Ford Eight-Passenger Country Sedan

Overview
- Manufacturer: Ford
- Also called: Ford Customline Country Sedan; Ford Galaxie 500 Country Sedan; Meteor Country Sedan
- Model years: 1952–1974
- Assembly: United States: Main plant; Dearborn, MI; Branch Assembly; Twin Cities, MN; Somerville, MA; Richmond, CA; Norfolk, VA; Memphis, TN; Louisville, KY; Long Beach, CA; Kansas City, MO; Edgewater, NJ; Dallas, TX; Chicago, IL; Chester, PA; Buffalo, NY; Atlanta, GA

Body and chassis
- Class: Full-size station wagon
- Body style: 2-door station wagon 4-door station wagon
- Related: Ford Ranch Wagon; Ford Country Squire; Ford Ranchero; Ford Del Rio; Mercury Commuter

The Ford Country Sedan is a full-size station wagon that was built by Ford in the United States from 1952 until 1974. It was part of the U.S. Ford full-size car line available in each year.

The Country Sedan was the mid-trim station wagon in the U.S. Ford range. Unlike the Country Squire, the Country Sedan featured plain body sides. As a full-size wagon, it could carry up to 9 passengers, if so equipped. For every year it was sold, regardless of the model line it was aligned with, the Country Sedan outsold the more exclusive Country Squire due to the more modest standard and optional equipment included while using the same powertrain as the more expensive version.

The Country Sedan was part of the Ford Customline range from 1952 to 1954. Beginning in 1955, Ford moved their station wagons into their own series and the Country Sedan continued to represent the mid-trim level station wagon. During the 1960s and 1970s, the Country Sedan was approximate to the Galaxie and later the Galaxie 500 in trim elements. For 1972, 1973 and 1974 the model was marketed as the Galaxie 500 Country Sedan and from 1975 it was rebranded LTD wagon. By this time the trim level was identical to the Country Squire apart from the absence of simulated wood exterior paneling.

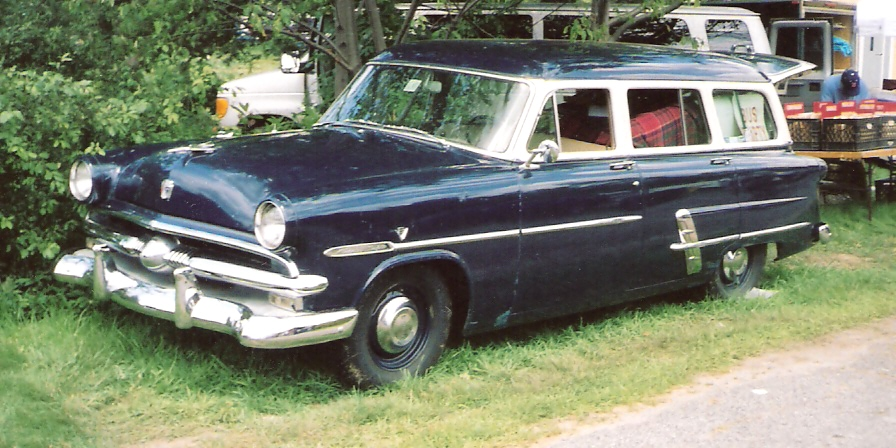
1953 Ford Customline Country Sedan

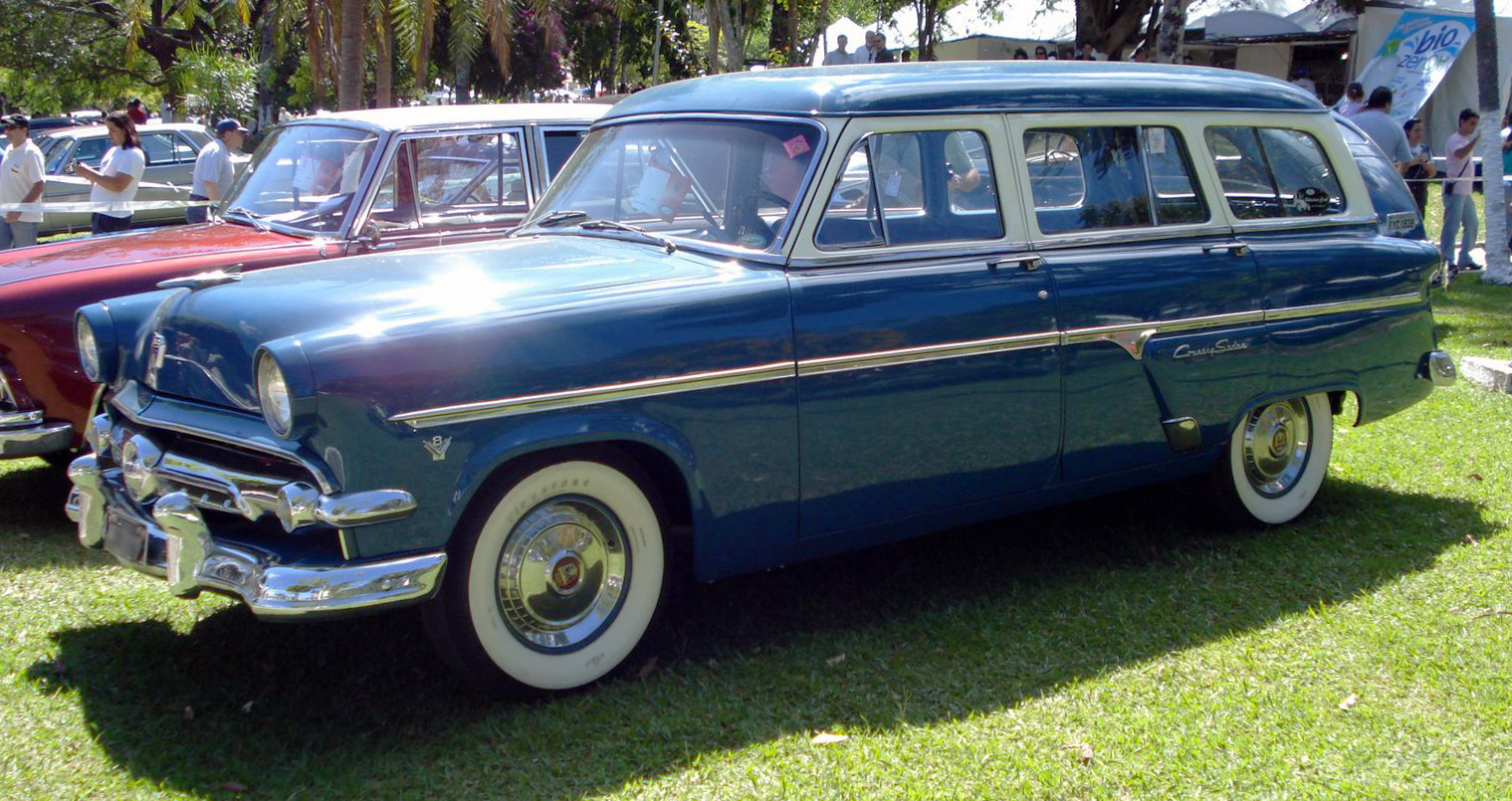
1954 Ford Customline Country Sedan

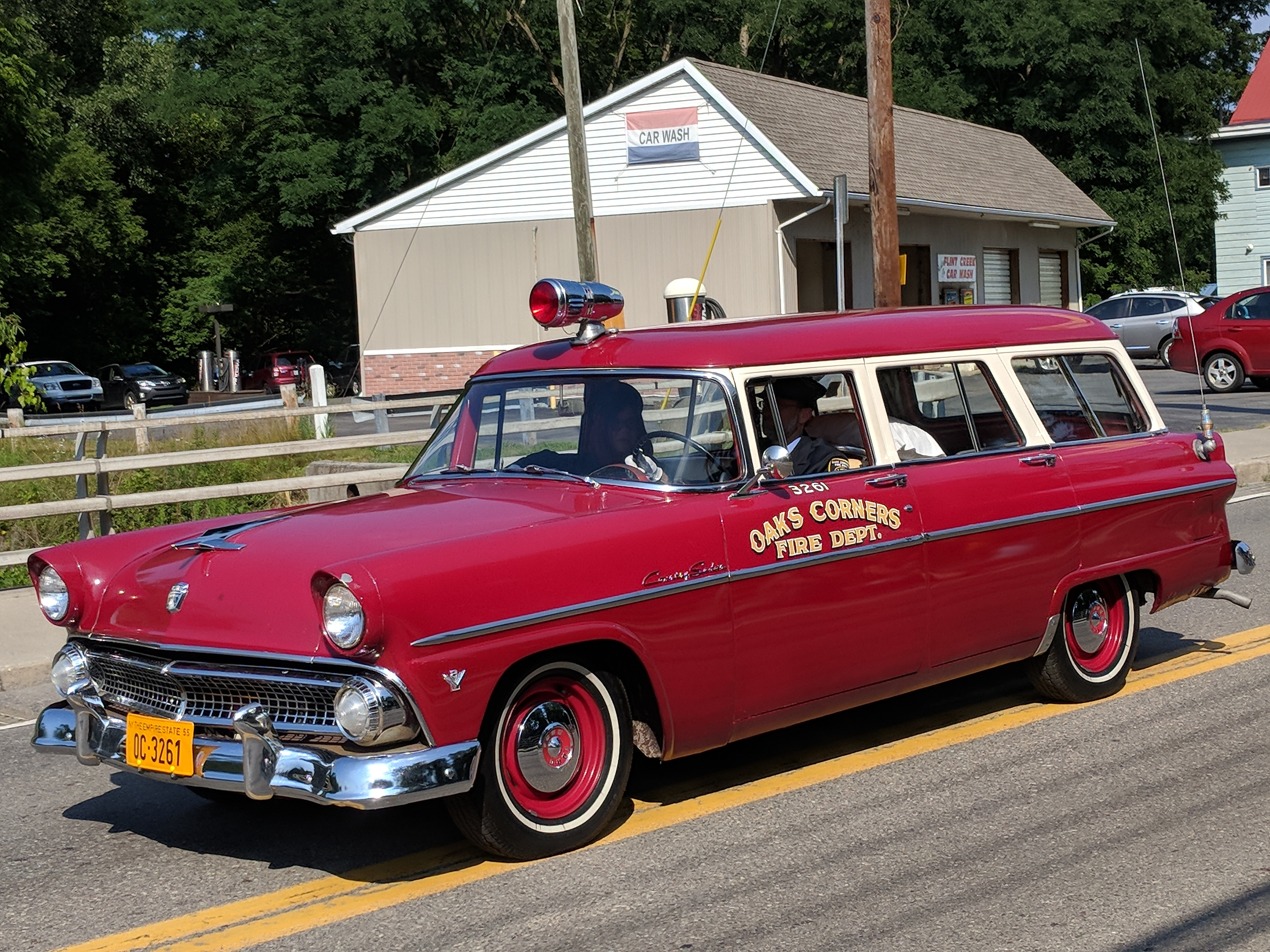
1955 Ford Country Sedan

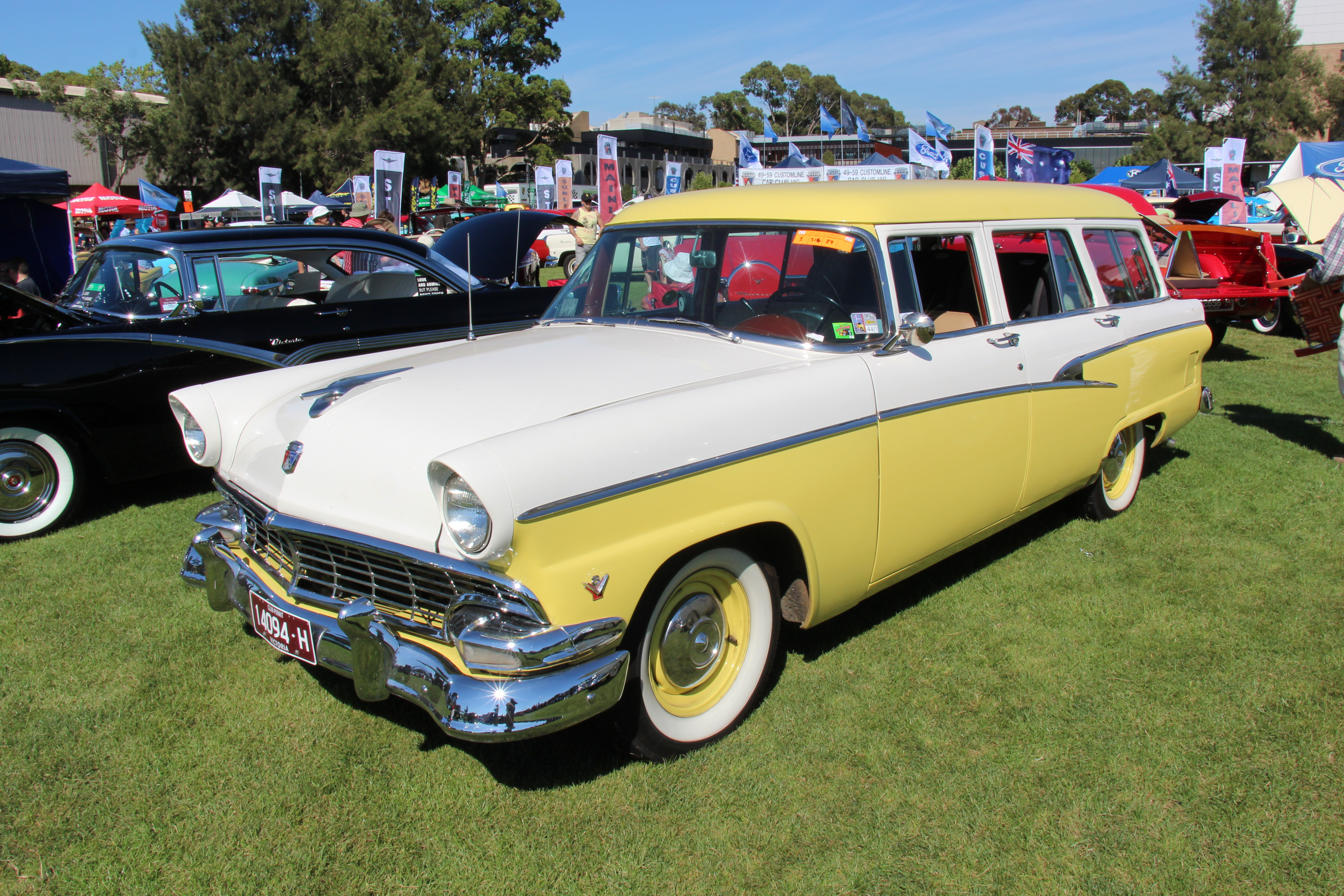
1956 Ford 6-Passenger Country Sedan

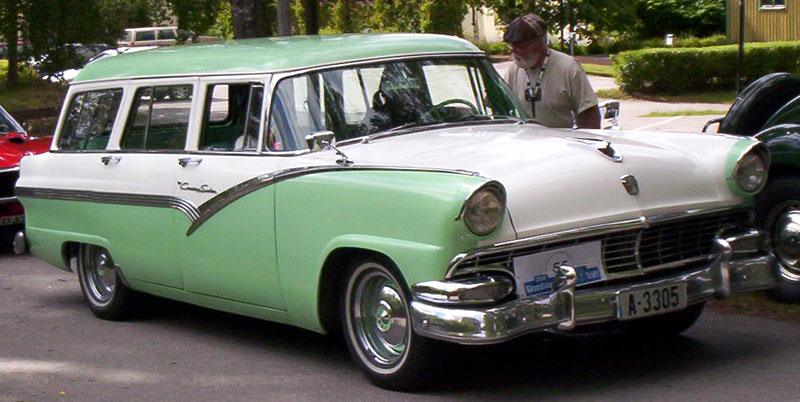
1956 Ford 8-Passenger Country Sedan

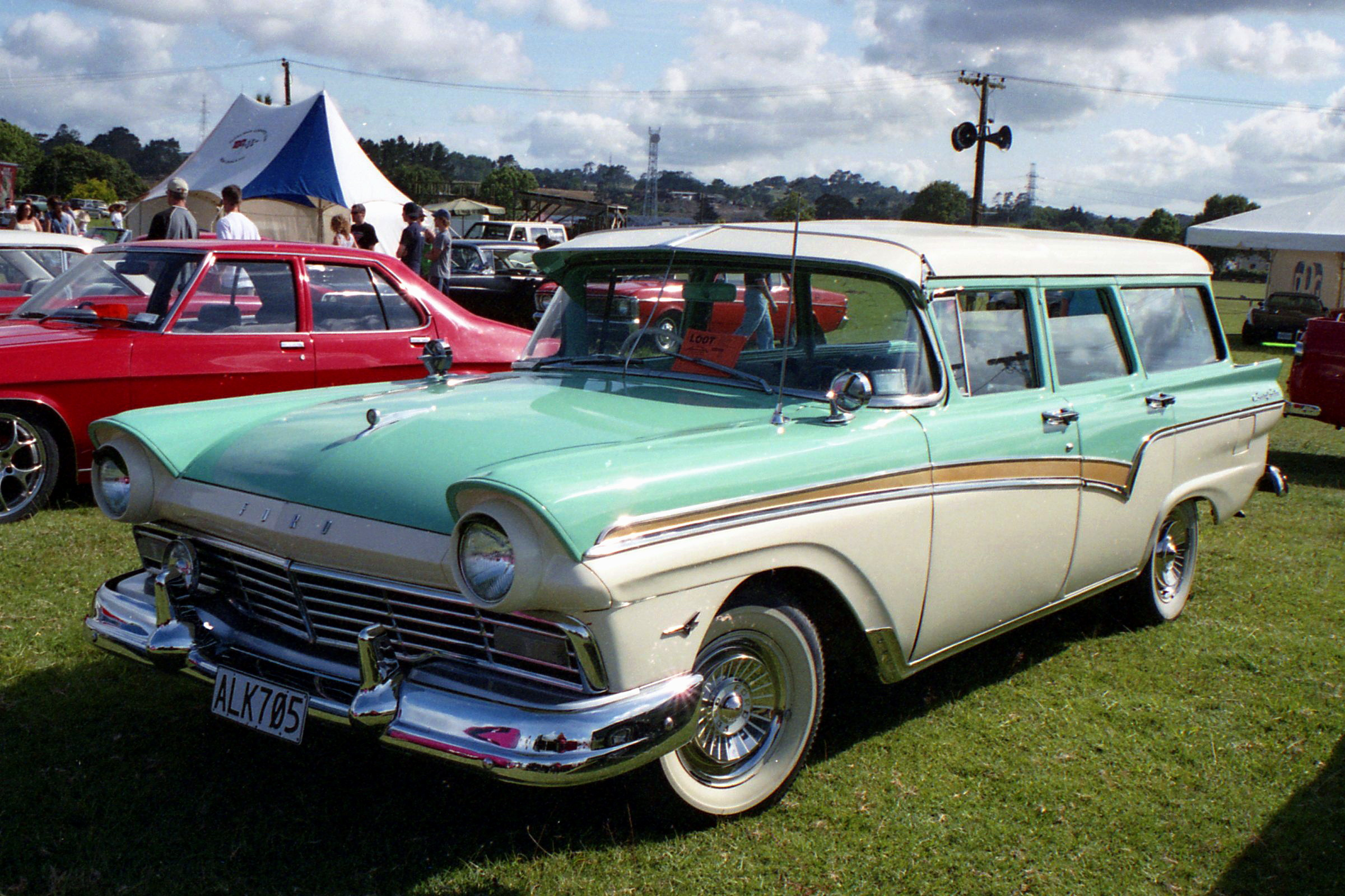
1957 Ford Country Sedan

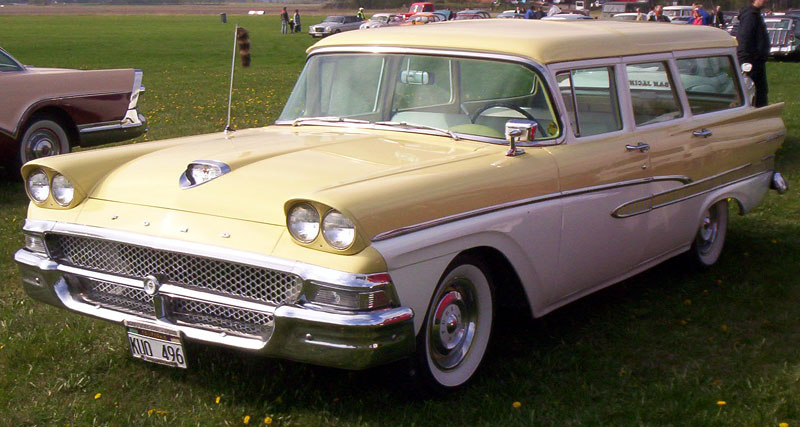
1958 Ford Country Sedan

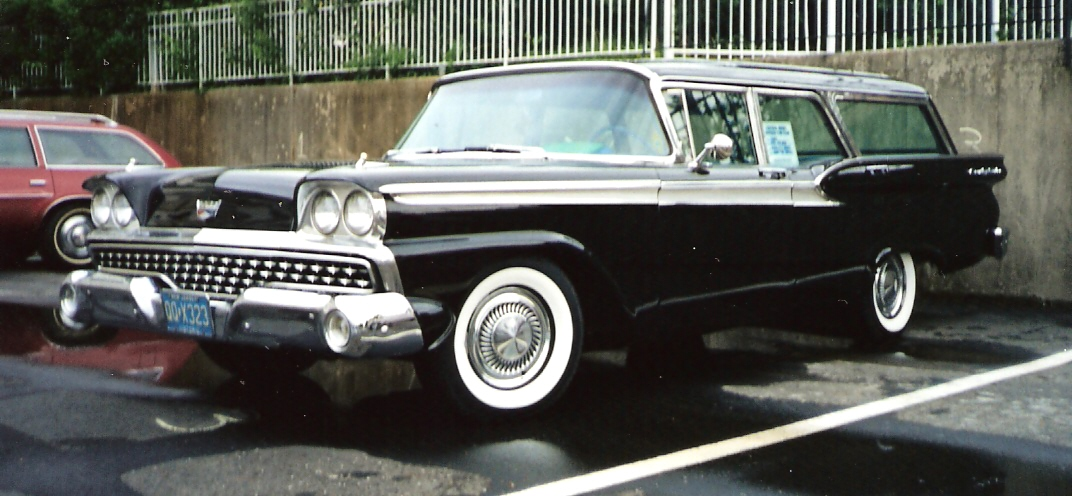
1959 Ford Country Sedan

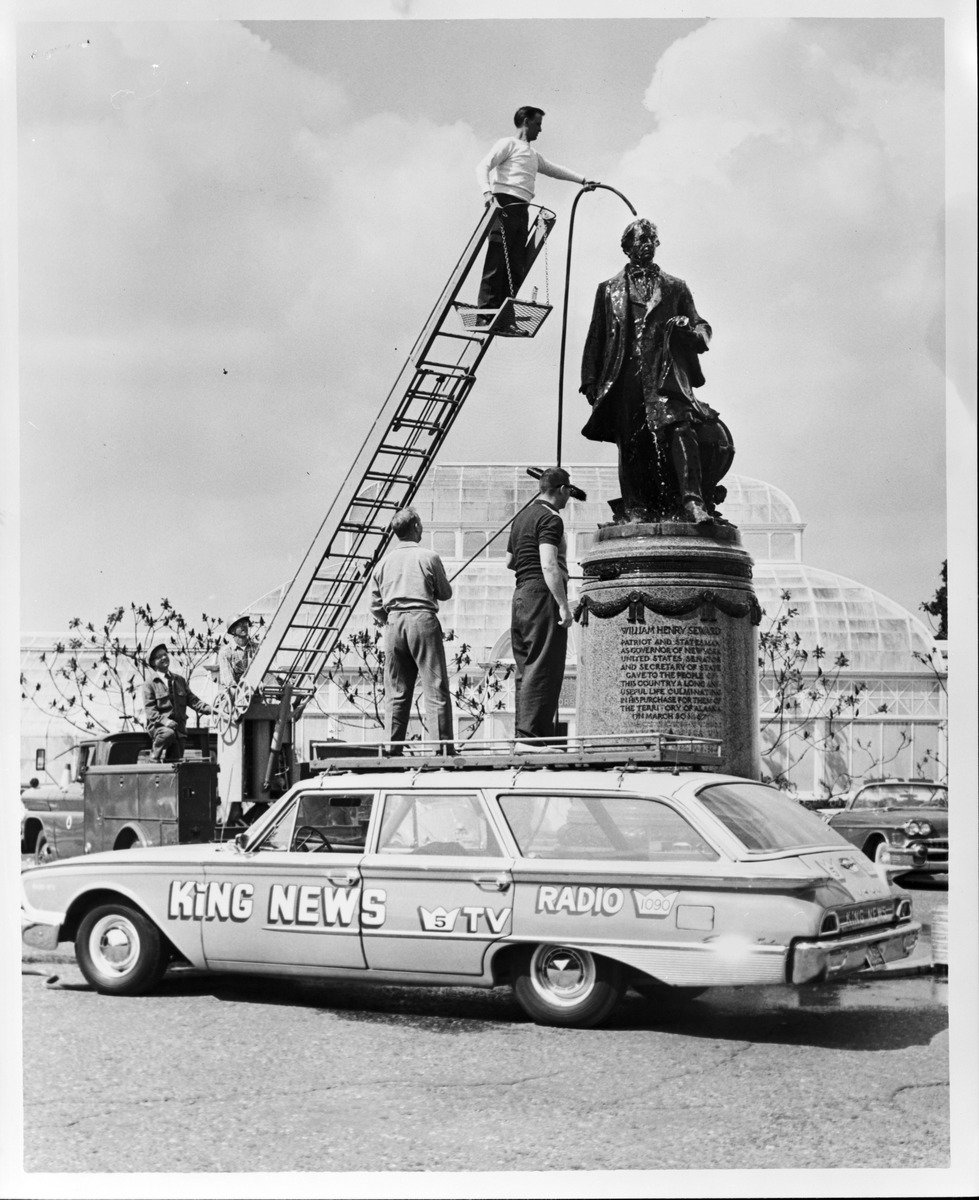
1960 Ford Country Sedan

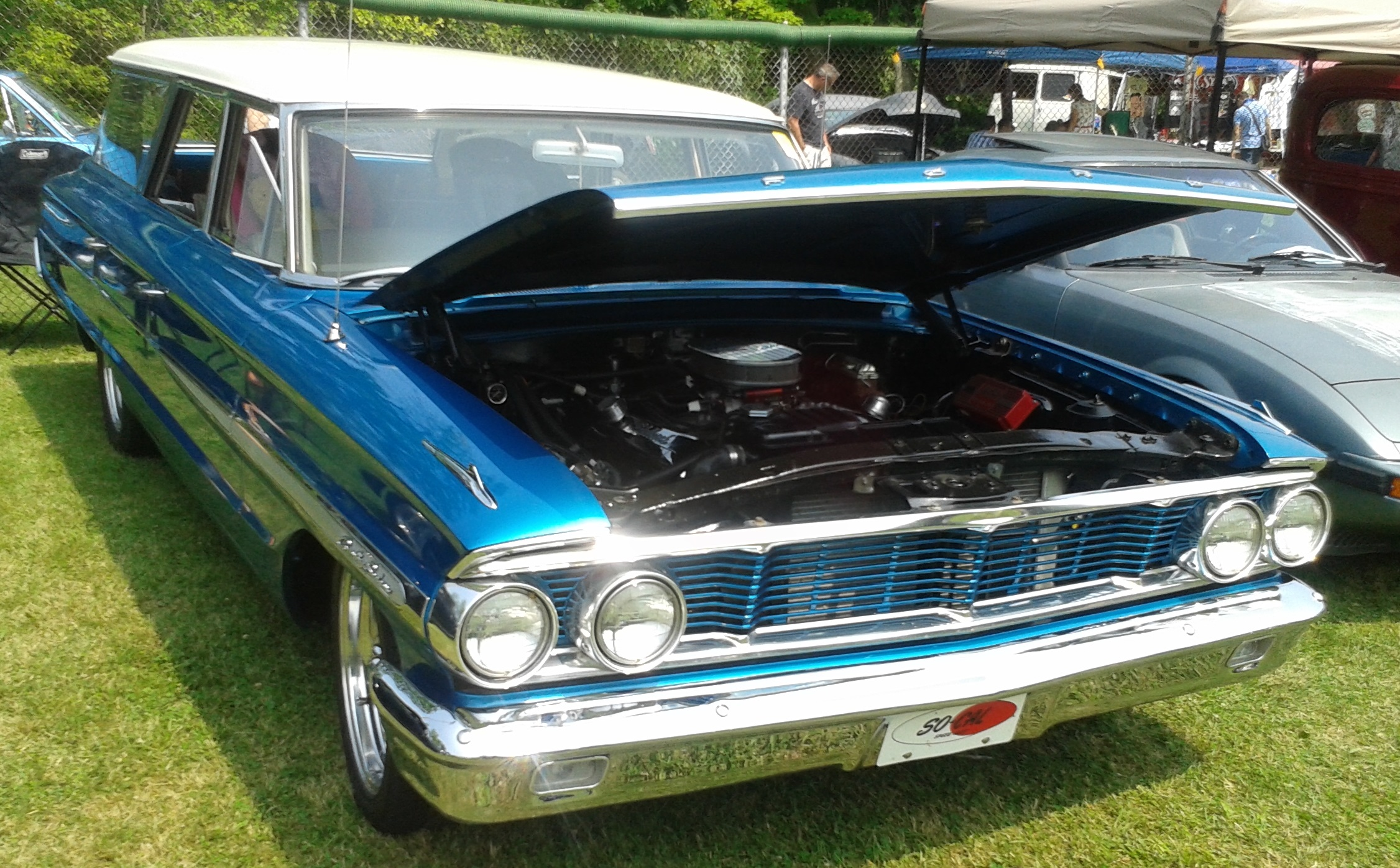
1964 Ford Country Sedan

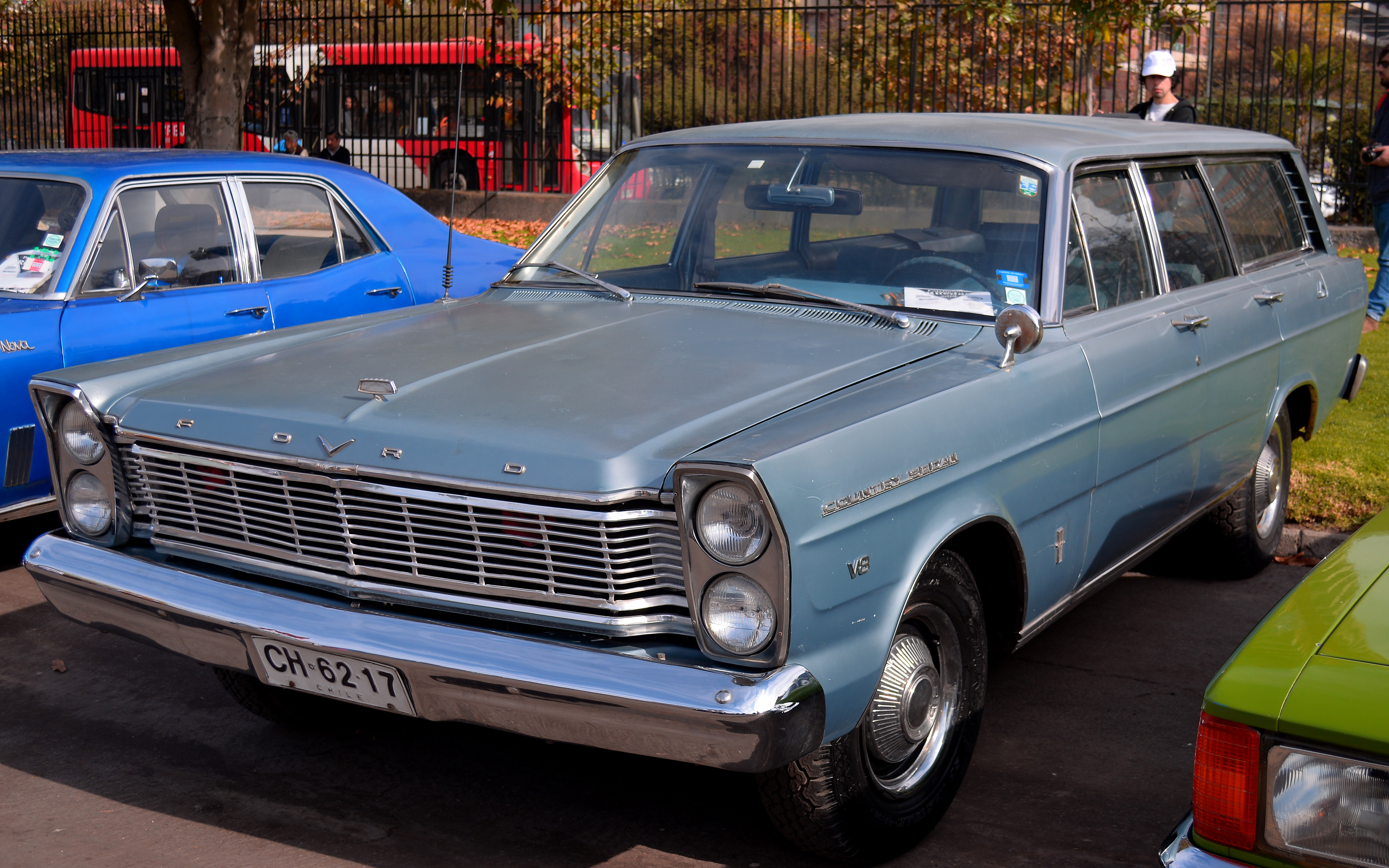
1965 Ford Country Sedan

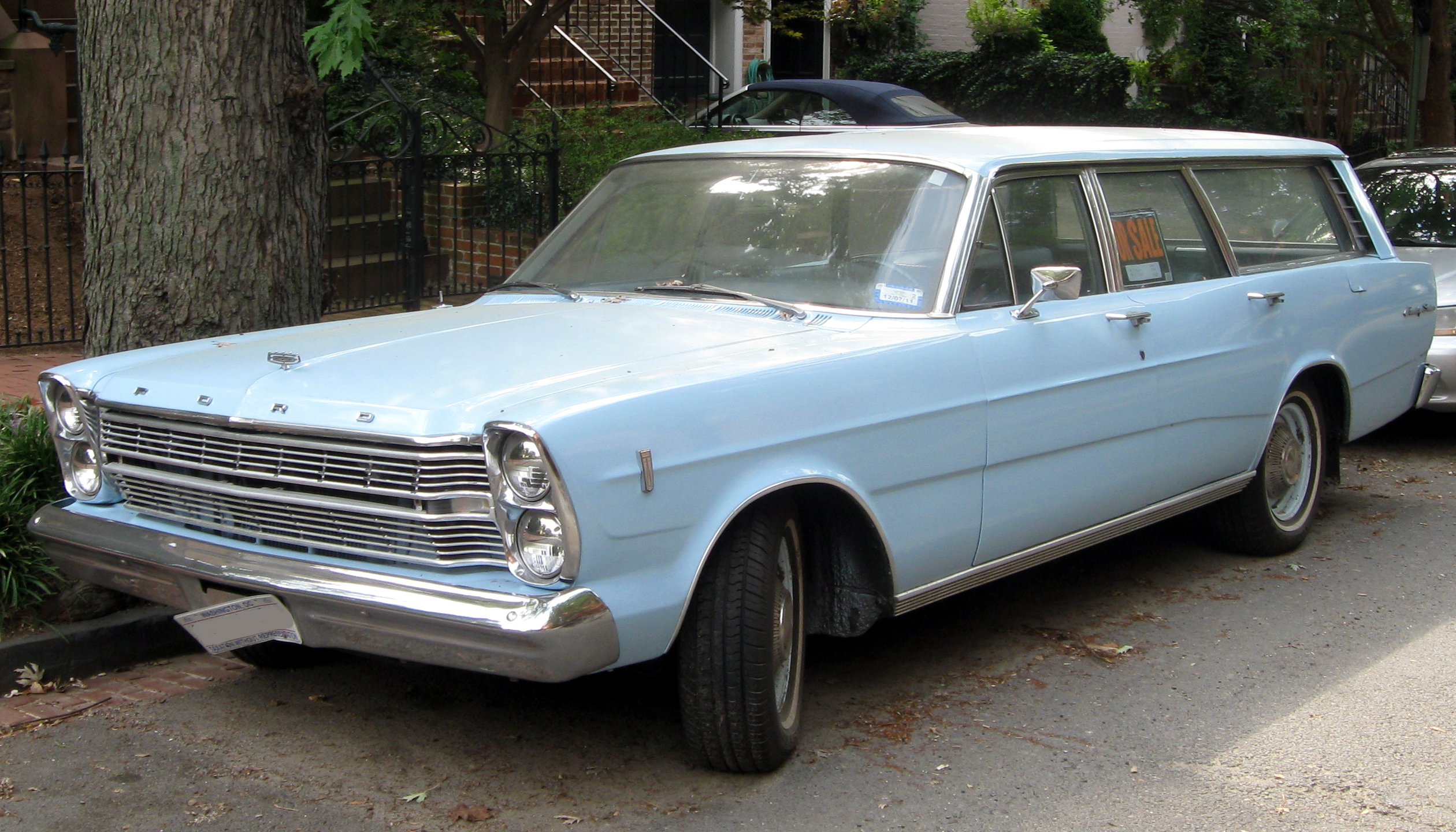
1966 Ford Country Sedan

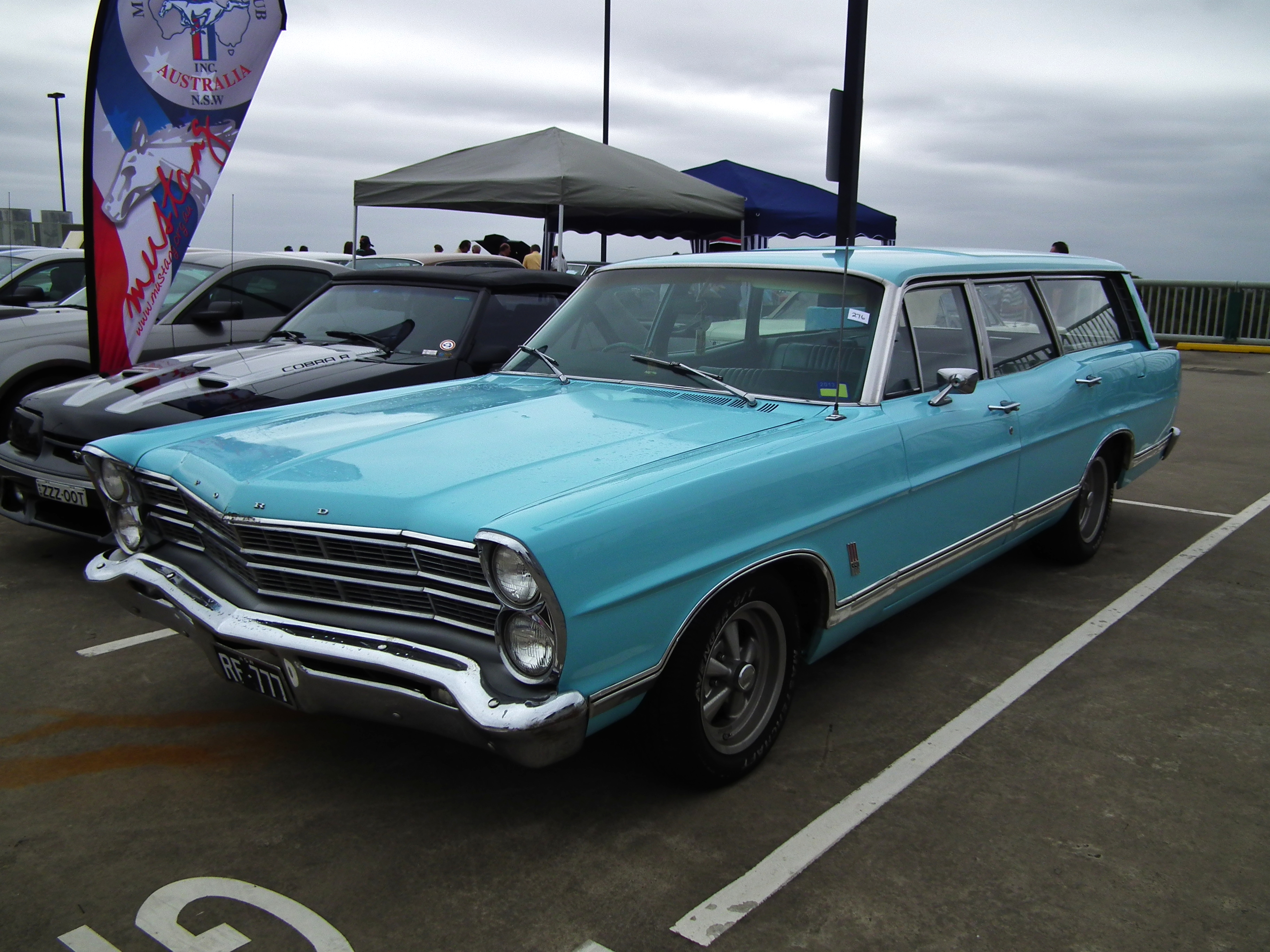
1967 Ford Country Sedan

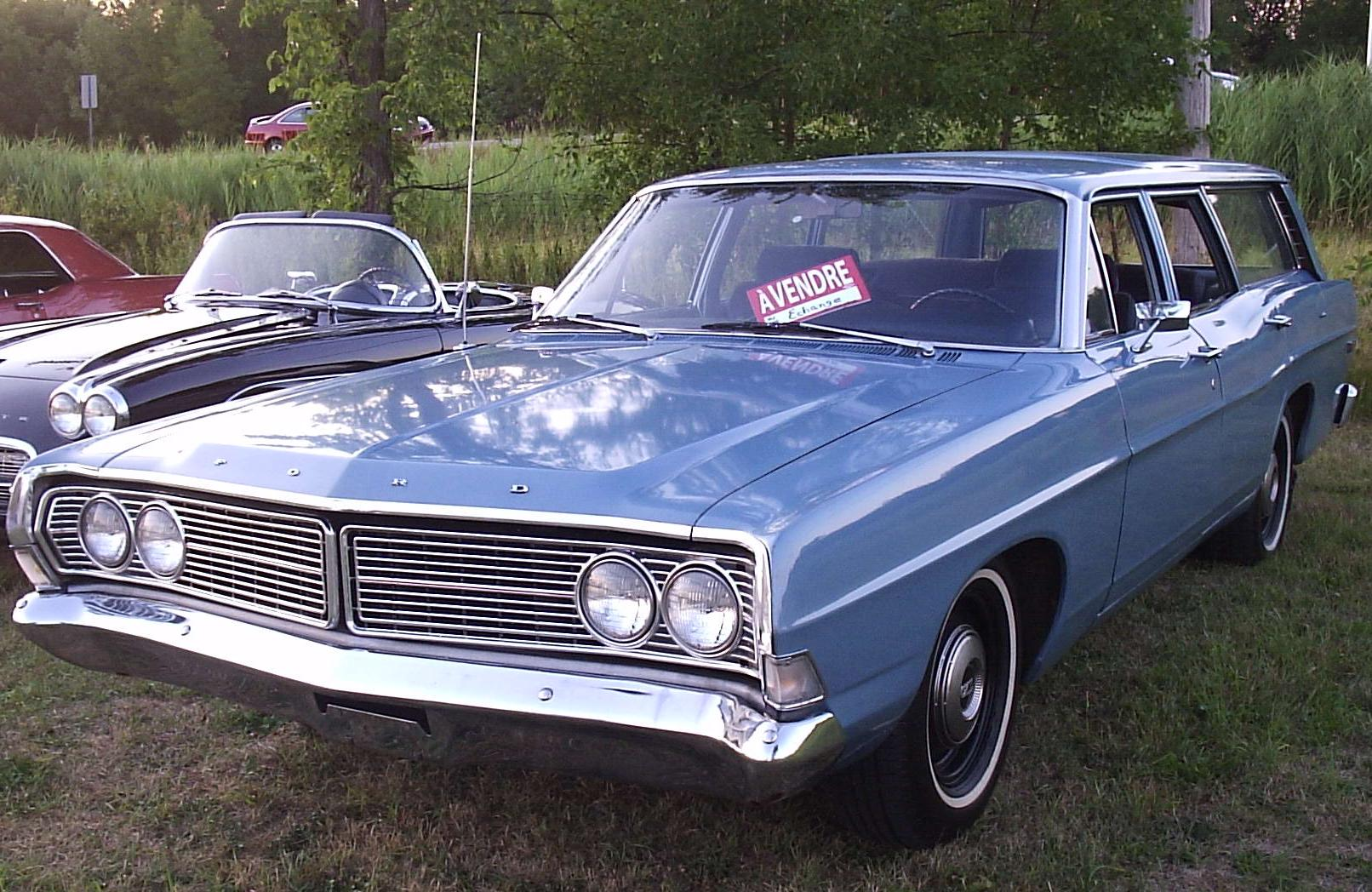
1968 Ford Country Sedan

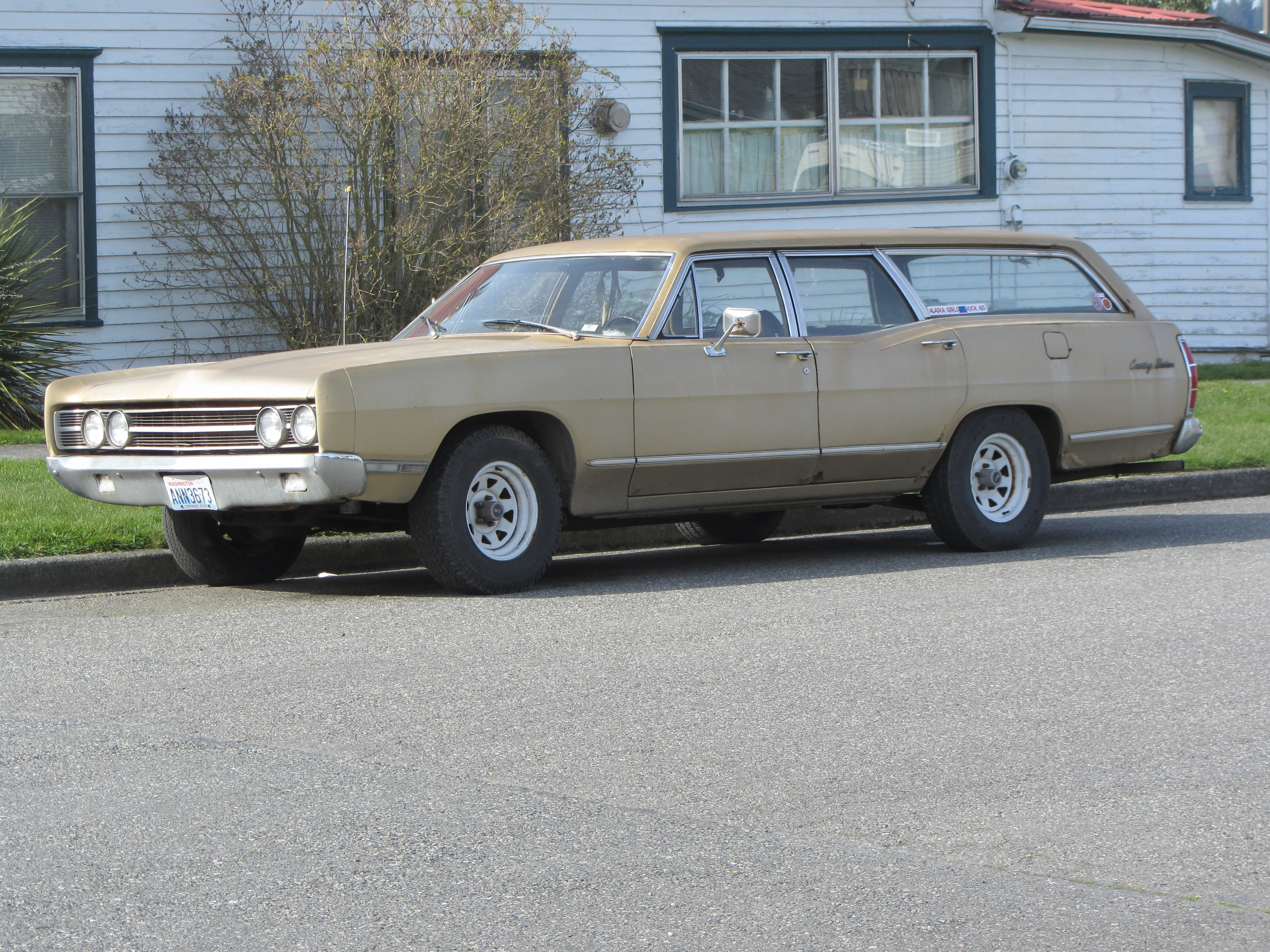
1969 Ford Country Sedan (with non-standard wheels)

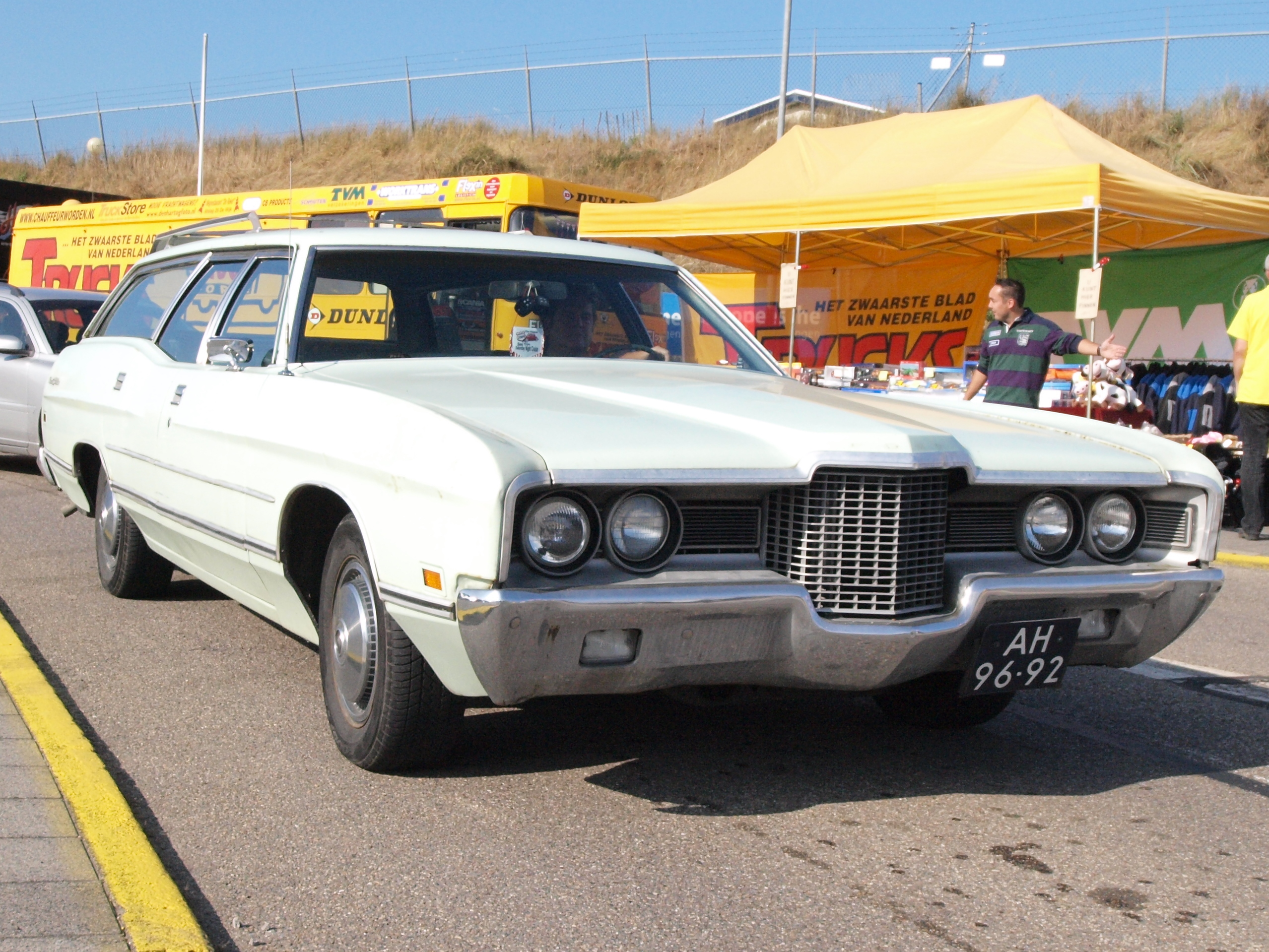
1971 Ford Country Sedan

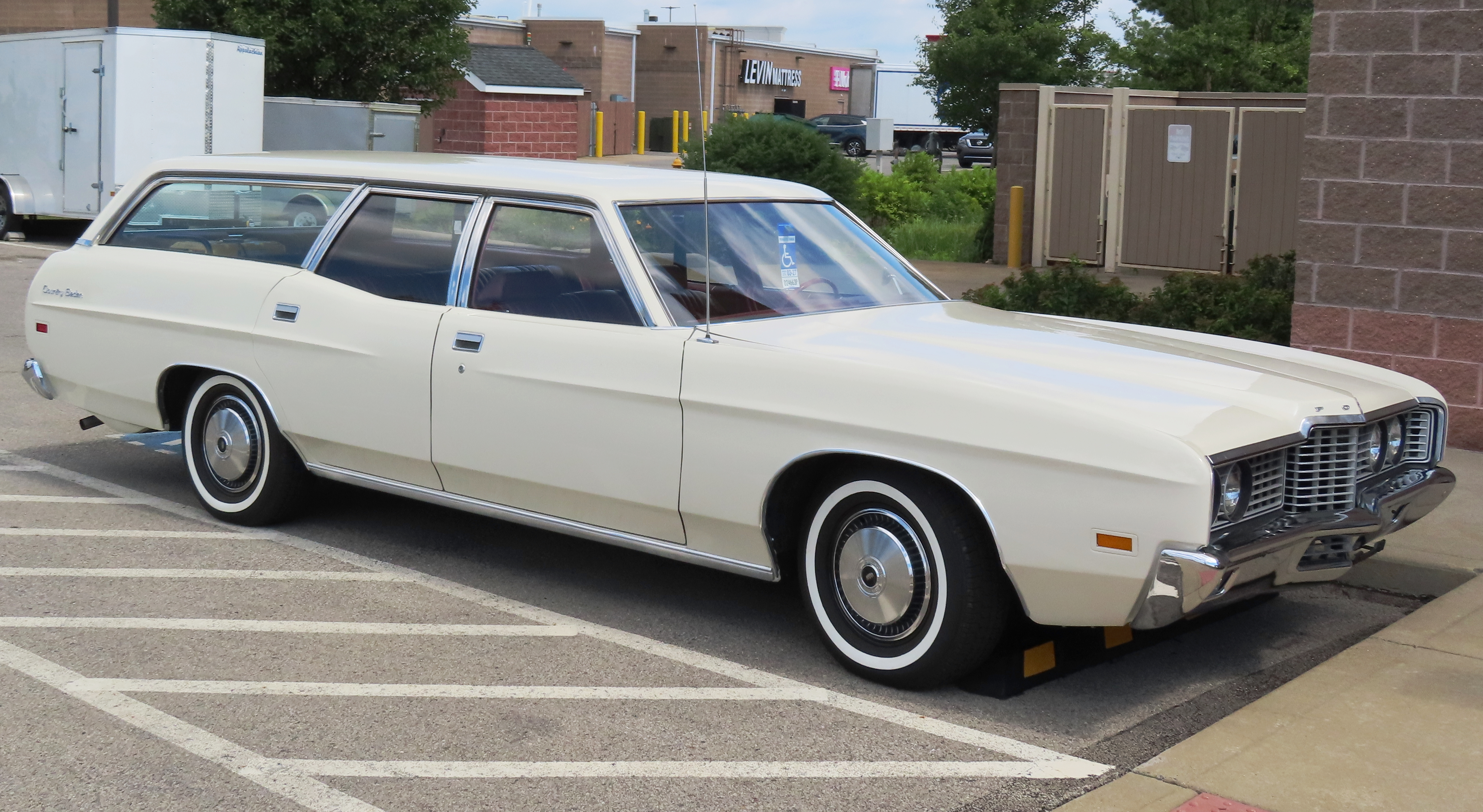
1972 Ford Galaxie 500 Country Sedan

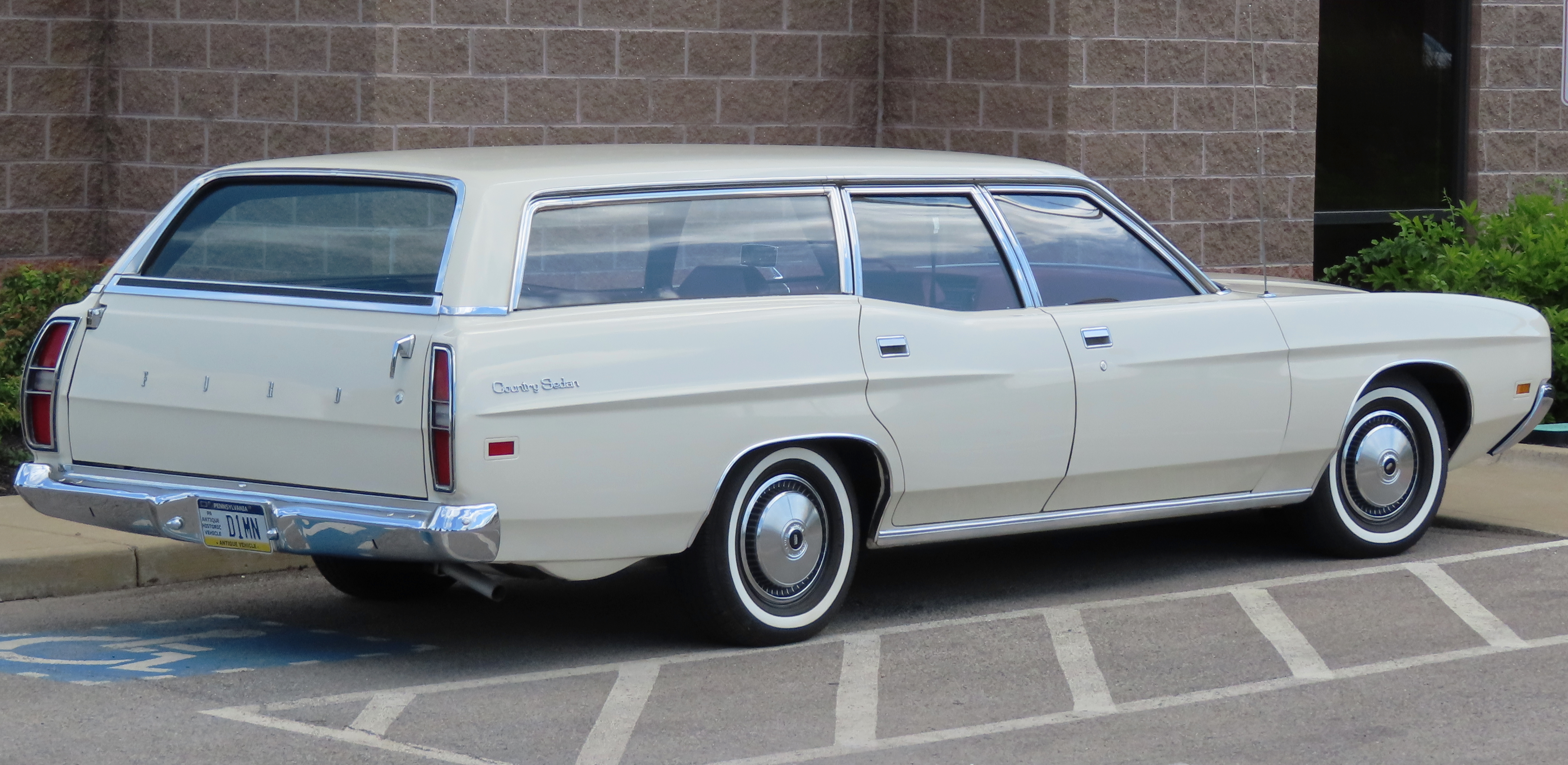
1972 Ford Galaxie 500 Country Sedan rear styling

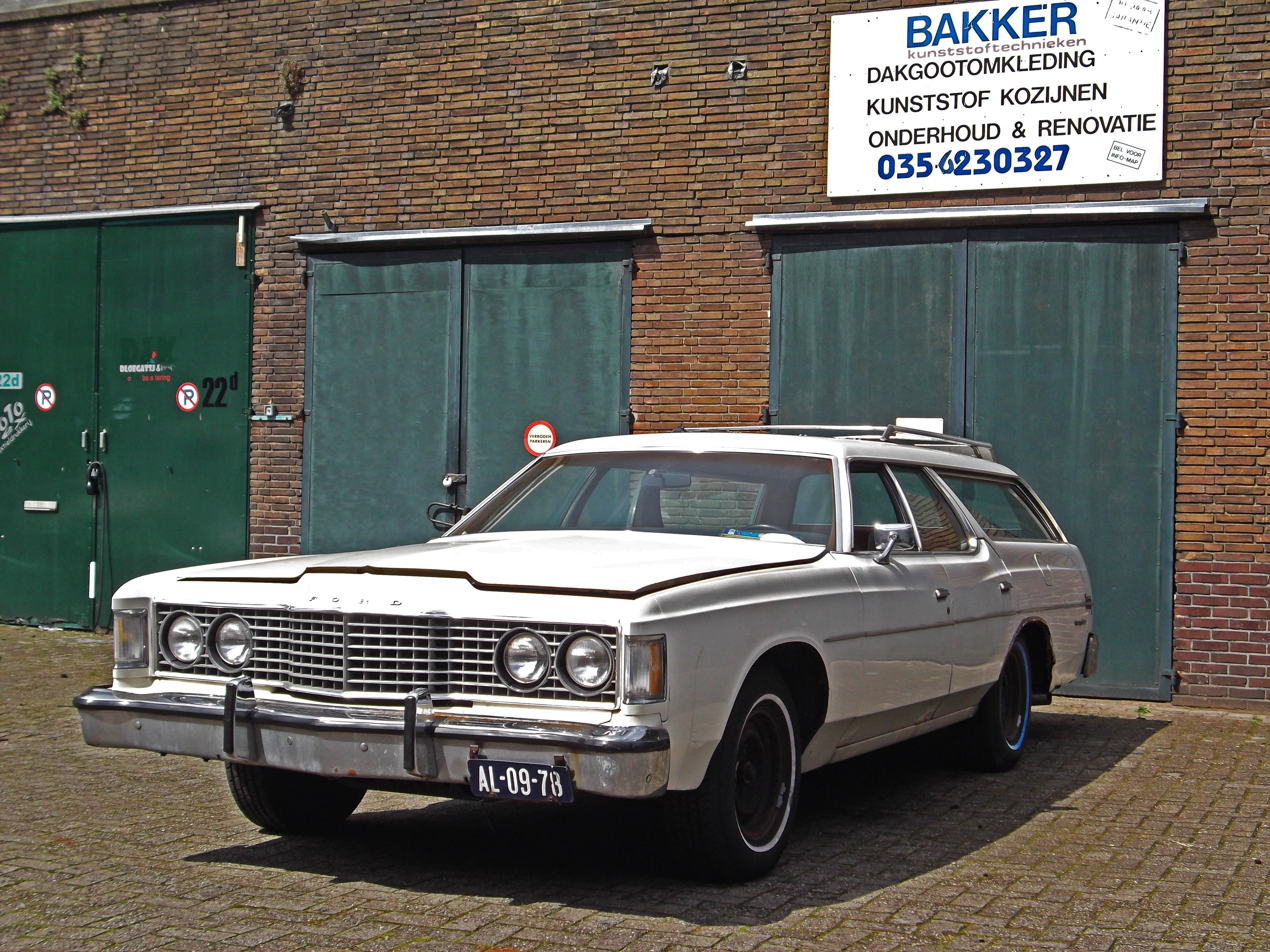
1973 Ford Galaxie 500 Country Sedan

== Sales ==
First-generation Country Sedan production
Year	Sales
1952	11,927
1953	37,743
1954	48,384

Second-generation Country Sedan production
Year	Sales
1955	106,284
1956	85,374

Third-generation Country Sedan production
Year	Sales
1957	49,638
1958	89,474
1959	123,412

Fourth-generation Country Sedan production (6- and 9 passenger combined)
Year	Sales
1960	78,579
1961	62,667
1962	64,197
1963	87,204
1964	94,239

Fifth-generation Country Sedan production (6- and 10 passenger combined)
Year	Sales
1965	92,037
1966	92,249
1967	85,195
1968	68,709

Sixth-generation Country Sedan production (6- and 10 passenger combined)
Year	Sales
1969	47,850
1970	54,854
1971	60,487
1972	55,238

== Rear gate advances ==
(Originally from Ford Country Squire)

Prior to 1961, all Ford wagons utilized a two-piece tailgate assembly that required the operator to lift the rear window and lock it into place via a mechanical support, and then drop the tail gate down to fully access the rear compartment.

For the 1961 model year, Ford incorporated a tailgate assembly that featured a self-storing window that could either be rolled down into the gate via crank on the outside of the gate, or by an electrical motor actuated by the key or an interior switch. A safety lockout measure required that the rear window had to be fully retracted into the gate before it could be lowered.

With the introduction of the 1966 models, all Ford wagons introduced the Magic Door Gate which allowed the tailgate on the vehicle to function as a traditional tailgate that could be lowered, or a door that swung outward for easier access to the seating area. The Magic Door Gate was made possible through a use of a traditional stationary hinge on the right, and a combination of hinges along the doors left side, which carried the weight of the gate as it swung outward when used as a door.

General Motors, Chrysler, AMC, and Toyota would adopt a similar configuration by the end of the 1960s.

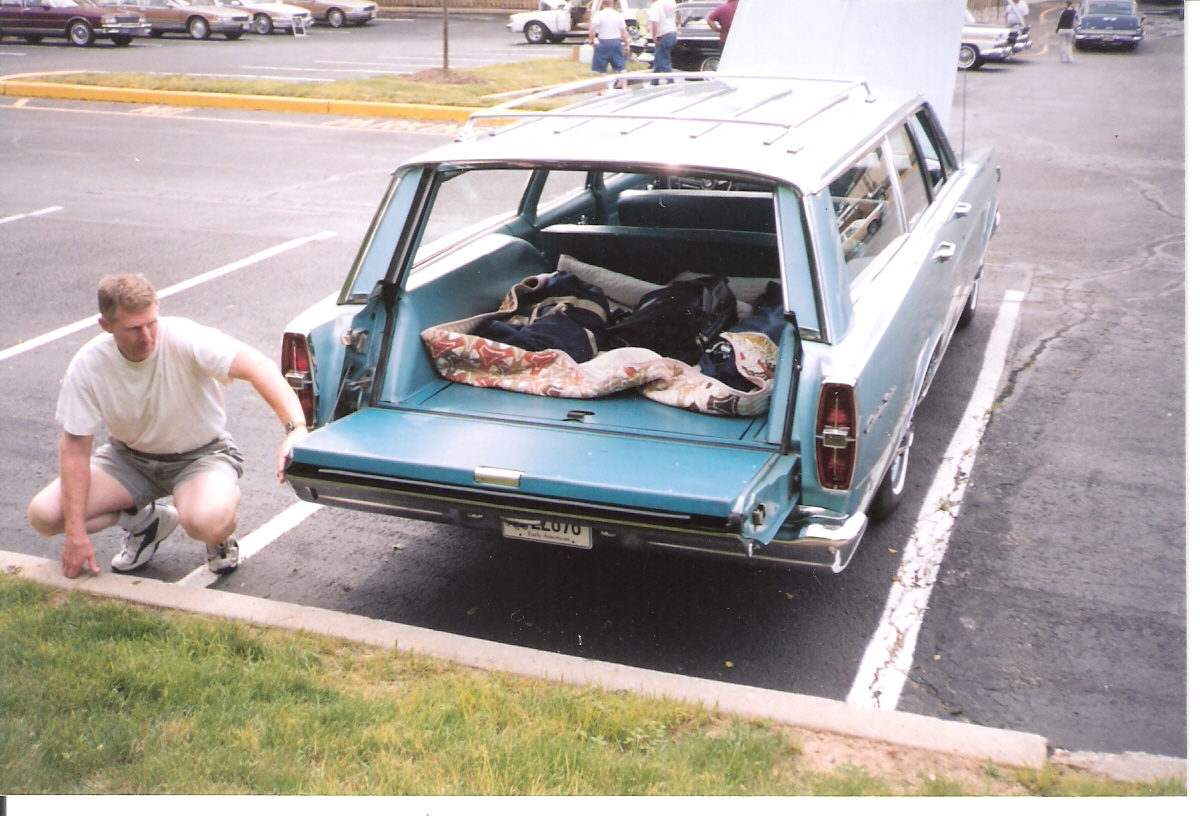
1966 Ford Country Sedan demonstrating that year's new Magic Doorgate that folds down...

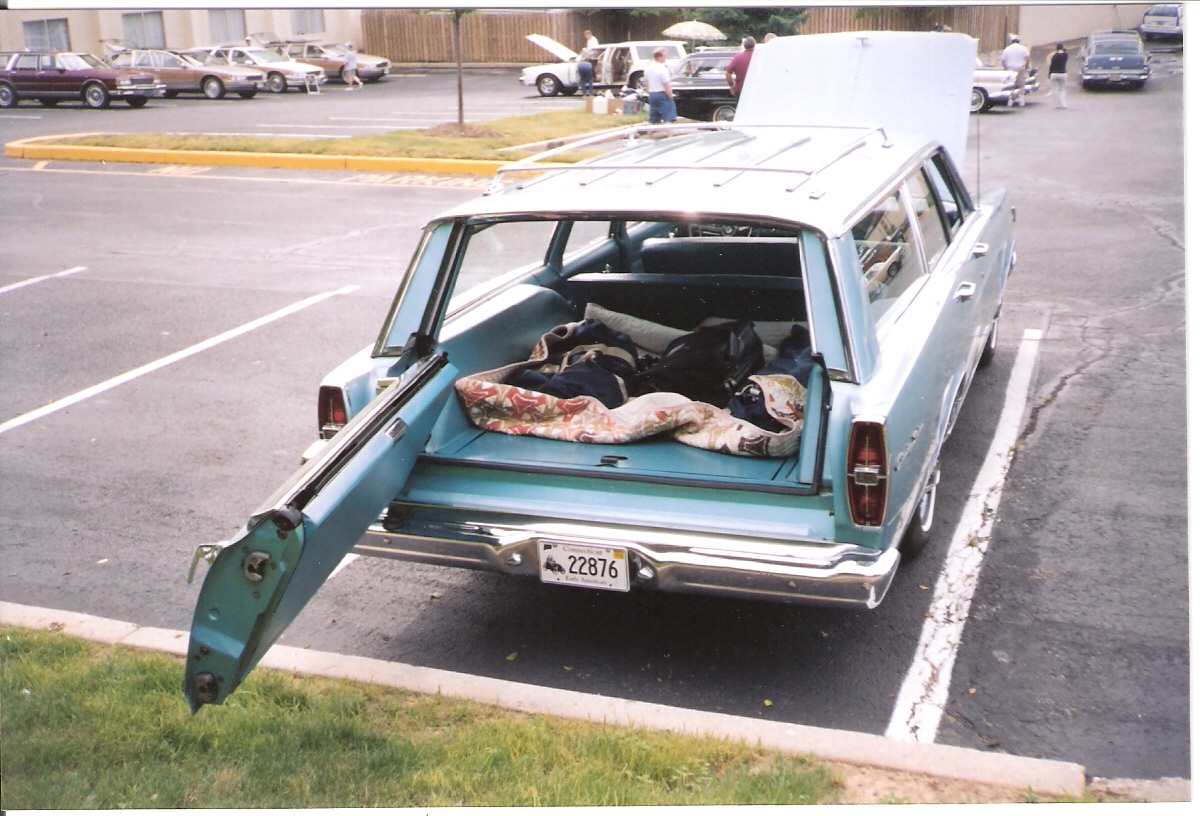
...and swings sideways like a door.
