= List of All-American Girls Professional Baseball League players (A–C) =

The following is a list of All-American Girls Professional Baseball League players who formed part of the circuit during its twelve years of existence.

== See also ==
- List of All-American Girls Professional Baseball League players (D–G)
- List of All-American Girls Professional Baseball League players (H–L)
- List of All-American Girls Professional Baseball League players (M–R)
- List of All-American Girls Professional Baseball League players (S–Z)

== A ==
Name	Position(s)	Year(s)	Team(s)	Ref
Velma Abbott	second base, third base	1946–1947	Kenosha Comets, Peoria Redwings, Rockford Peaches, Fort Wayne Daisies	
Fredda Acker	pitcher	1947	South Bend Blue Sox	
Evelyn Adams	shortstop	1946	Fort Wayne Daisies, Grand Rapids Chicks	
Ellen Ahrndt	second base	1945	South Bend Blue Sox	
Eileen Albright	pitcher, second base, third base	1948	Chicago Colleens	
Gertrude Alderfer	first base, catcher	1949–1950	Springfield Sallies, Chicago Colleens, Kalamazoo Lassies	
Beatrice Allard	pitcher	1949	Muskegon Lassies	
Agnes Allen	pitcher, outfield	1950–1953	Springfield Sallies, Kalamazoo Lassies, Battle Creek Belles	
Melba Alspaugh	outfield	1948	Fort Wayne Daisies, Rockford Peaches, Muskegon Lassies	
Isabel Alvarez	pitcher, outfield	1949–1954	Chicago Colleens, Fort Wayne Daisies, Battle Creek Belles, Kalamazoo Lassies, Grand Rapids Chicks	
Janet Anderson	pitcher	1946	Kenosha Comets	
Vivian Anderson	third base	1944	Milwaukee Chicks	
Amy Applegren	pitcher, first base	1944–1953	Rockford Peaches, Muskegon Lassies, South Bend Blue Sox	
Beatrice Arbour	shortstop	1947	Racine Belles	
Ange Armato	second base	1949, 1953	Rockford Peaches, Kalamazoo Lassies	
Beverly Armstrong	pitcher	1952	Rockford Peaches	
Charlotte Armstrong	pitcher	1944–1945	South Bend Blue Sox	
Lenna Arnold	pitcher	1946	Fort Wayne Daisies	
Louise Arnold	pitcher	1948–1949, 1951–1952	South Bend Blue Sox	
Norene Arnold	pitcher	1949	Springfield Sallies, Muskegon Lassies	

== B ==
Name	Position(s)	Year(s)	Team(s)	Ref
Mary Baker	catcher, infield	1943–1950, 1952	South Bend Blue Sox, Kalamazoo Lassies	
Phyllis Baker	pitcher	1953–1954	Battle Creek Belles, Muskegon Belles, South Bend Blue Sox, Fort Wayne Daisies	
Chris Ballingall	catcher, first base, outfield	1943–1953, 1954	Muskegon Belles, Kalamazoo Lassies	
Barbara Barbaze	outfield	1948	Springfield Sallies	
Lois Barker	third base, right field	1950	Grand Rapids Chicks	
Joyce Barnes	pitcher	1943	Kenosha Comets	
Charlene Barnett	second base	1947–1950	Grand Rapids Chicks, Chicago Colleens, Rockford Peaches	
Edith Barney	catcher	1948	Grand Rapids Chicks	
Doris Barr	pitcher, outfield	1943–1950	South Bend Blue Sox, Racine Belles, Springfield Sallies, Muskegon Lassies, Peoria Redwings, Kalamazoo Lassies	
Patricia Barringer	second base	1947	Muskegon Lassies	
Annastasia Batikis	center field	1945	Racine Belles	
Fern Battaglia	second base, third base	1950–1951	Chicago Colleens, Springfield Sallies, Battle Creek Belles	
Mary Baumgartner	catcher	1949–1954	Chicago Colleens, Springfield Sallies, Peoria Redwings, Kalamazoo Lassies, South Bend Blue Sox	
Betty Bays	outfield, catcher	1950–1951	Chicago Colleens, Springfield Sallies, Grand Rapids Chicks	
Kathryn Beare	catcher	1946	Fort Wayne Daisies	
Lottie Beck	catcher	1946	Fort Wayne Daisies	
Donna Becker	pitcher	1951	Kalamazoo Lassies	
Virginia Bell	pitcher, outfield	1948	Springfield Sallies	
Lois Bellman	infield, outfield	1949	Chicago Colleens	
Catherine Bennett	pitcher	1943–1944	Kenosha Comets, South Bend Blue Sox	
Barbara Berger	catcher	1949–1950	Chicago Colleens, Racine Belles	
Joan Berger	infield, right field	1951–1954	Rockford Peaches	
Margaret Berger	pitcher	1943–1944	South Bend Blue Sox	
Norma Berger	pitcher	1950	Springfield Sallies	
Erma Bergmann	pitcher	1946–1951	Muskegon Lassies, Springfield Sallies, Racine Belles, Battle Creek Belles	
Mary Lou Beschorner	outfield	1949–1950	Grand Rapids Chicks, Peoria Redwings	
Muriel Bevis	outfield, pitcher	1950	Kenosha Comets	
Nalda Bird	pitcher, outfield	1945	South Bend Blue Sox	
Jaynne Bittner	pitcher	1948–1954	South Bend Blue Sox, Muskegon Lassies, Grand Rapids Chicks, Fort Wayne Daisies	
Maybelle Blair	pitcher	1948	Peoria Redwings	
Alice Blaski	outfield	1953–1954	Fort Wayne Daisies	
Audrey Bleiler	third base, shortstop	1950–1952	South Bend Blue Sox	
Kay Blumetta	pitcher, first base, outfield	1944–1954	Minneapolis Millerettes, Milwaukee Chicks, Grand Rapids Chicks, Peoria Redwings, Fort Wayne Daisies, Kalamazoo Lassies	
Phyllis Bookout	infield utility	1953	Fort Wayne Daisies	
Lorraine Borg	catcher	1944	Minneapolis Millerettes	
Ruth Born	pitcher	1943	South Bend Blue Sox	
Ethel Boyce	catcher	1946	Kenosha Comets	
Rita Briggs	catcher, outfield	1947–1954	Rockford Peaches, Chicago Colleens, South Bend Blue Sox, Peoria Redwings, Battle Creek Belles, Fort Wayne Daisies	
Wilma Briggs	outfield, first base	1948–1954	Fort Wayne Daisies, South Bend Blue Sox	
Leola Brody	infield	1943	Racine Belles	
Carol Brown	n/a	1953	Fort Wayne Daisies	
Patricia Brown	pitcher	1950–1951	Chicago Colleens, Battle Creek Belles	
Delores Brumfield	infield, outfield	1947–1953	South Bend Blue Sox, Kenosha Comets, Fort Wayne Daisies	
Marian Bryson	pitcher	1946	Peoria Redwings	
Florence Bucior	infield	1946	Peoria Redwings	
Jean Buckley	center field	1950–1952	Kenosha Comets, Rockford Peaches	
Lorraine Bunton	pitcher	1951	Rockford Peaches	
Geraldine Bureker	outfield	1948	Racine Belles	
Shirley Burkovich	outfield, pitcher	1949–1951	Muskegon Lassies, Chicago Colleens, Springfield Sallies, Fort Wayne Daisies, Rockford Peaches	
Eileen Burmeister	outfield, catcher, infield	1943–1944	Rockford Peaches	
Patricia Burton	pitcher	1950	Fort Wayne Daisies	
Arlene Buszka	infield utility	1953	South Bend Blue Sox	
Mary Butcher	pitcher	1945–1946	Kenosha Comets, Grand Rapids Chicks	

== C ==
Name	Position(s)	Year(s)	Team(s)	Ref
Aldine Calacurcio	shortstop	1947	Rockford Peaches	
Helen Callaghan *	outfield	1944–1946, 1948	Minneapolis Millerettes, Fort Wayne Daisies, Kenosha Comets	
Margaret Callaghan	third base, second base	1944–1951	Minneapolis Millerettes, Fort Wayne Daisies, South Bend Blue Sox, Peoria Redwings, Battle Creek Belles	
Eleanor Callow	outfield	1947–1954	Peoria Redwings, Chicago Colleens, Rockford Peaches	
Georgia Campbell	pitcher	1946	Fort Wayne Daisies	
Janet Campbell	utility	1951	South Bend Blue Sox	
Jean Campbell	catcher	1946	Fort Wayne Daisies	
Ruth Campbell	n/a	1949	n/a	
Mary Carey	third base, second base, shortstop	1946–1954	Kenosha Comets, Peoria Redwings, Kalamazoo Lassies, Muskegon Belles, Rockford Peaches, South Bend Blue Sox	
Phyllis Carlson	utility	1949	Muskegon Lassies	
Virginia Carver	pitcher, outfield	1953–1954	South Bend Blue Sox, Fort Wayne Daisies	
Betty Carveth	pitcher	1945	Rockford Peaches, Fort Wayne Daisies	
Isora Castillo	second base, third base	1949–1951	Chicago Colleens, Kalamazoo Lassies, Kenosha Comets	
Donna Chartier	infield utility	1953	Kalamazoo Lassies	
Bea Chester	third base	1943–1944	South Bend Blue Sox, Rockford Peaches	
Clara Chiano	infield utility	1944	Racine Belles	
Thelma Childress	utility	1946	Grand Rapids Chicks	
Dorothy Christ	outfield utility	1948	South Bend Blue Sox	
Ann Cindric	pitcher	1948–1950	Muskegon Lassies, Springfield Sallies	
Jean Cione	pitcher, first base, outfield	1945–1954	Rockford Peaches, Peoria Redwings, Kenosha Comets, Battle Creek Belles, Muskegon Belles	
Louise Clapp	pitcher	1953–1954	Grand Rapids Chicks, South Bend Blue Sox	
Corinne Clark	infield, outfield	1949	Peoria Redwings	
Muriel Coben	pitcher	1943	South Bend Blue Sox, Rockford Peaches	
Lucille Colacito	catcher	1944–1945	Kenosha Comets	
Clara Cook	pitcher	1943–1944	Rockford Peaches, Kenosha Comets, Milwaukee Chicks	
Donna Cook	pitcher, outfield	1946–1954	Muskegon Lassies, Chicago Colleens, Fort Wayne Daisies, Grand Rapids Chicks, Battle Creek Belles, South Bend Blue Sox, Muskegon Belles, Rockford Peaches	
Doris Cook	pitcher, outfield	1949–1953	Springfield Sallies, Kalamazoo Lassies, South Bend Blue Sox	
Dorothy Cook	utility	1946	Fort Wayne Daisies, Rockford Peaches	
Bonnie Cooper	second base	1952	Battle Creek Belles	
Gloria Cordes	pitcher	1950–1954	Muskegon Lassies, Kalamazoo Lassies, Racine Belles, Battle Creek Belles	
Betty Jane Cornett	third base, pitcher	1950–1951	Rockford Peaches, Springfield Sallies, Kalamazoo Lassies, Battle Creek Belles	
Rita Corrigan	pitcher	1943	Racine Belles	
Patricia Courtney	third base	1950	Grand Rapids Chicks, Chicago Colleens	
Dorothy Cramer	n/a	1951	Rockford Peaches	
Peggy Cramer	catcher	1954	South Bend Blue Sox	
Pauline Crawley	outfield	1946, 1951	Peoria Redwings, Battle Creek Belles	
Idona Crigler	third base	1947	South Bend Blue Sox	
Shirley Crites	third base	1953	Fort Wayne Daisies	

* Callaghan also played under her married name of Helen Candaele.
