= Jean Havlish =

American baseball player (1935–2025)

- Shortstop
- Born: November 23, 1935; Saint Paul, Minnesota, U.S.
- Died: September 1, 2025 (aged 89)
- Batted: Right Threw: Right

debut
- 1952

Last appearance
- 1954

Teams
- Fort Wayne Daisies (1952–1954)

Career highlights and awards
- Two-playoff appearances

Jean Ann Havlish (November 23, 1935 – September 1, 2025), nicknamed Grasshopper, was a shortstop who played from 1953 through 1954 in the All-American Girls Professional Baseball League (AAGPBL). Listed at 5 ft 6 in (1.68 m), 130 lb (59 kg), Havlish batted and threw right-handed. She was born in Saint Paul, Minnesota.

== Brief profile ==
A slick-fielding shortstop, Jean Havlish joined the Fort Wayne Daisies during the last three seasons of the All-American Girls Professional Baseball League (AAGPBL). She posted a modest .218 batting average in 193 games, but provided outstanding defense with a strong and secure throwing arm. After the league disbanded in 1954, Havlish played elite fast-pitch softball and competed successfully in bowling for over three decades, leading the WIBC Top Twenty Year Average list for many years. She died on September 1, 2025, at the age of 89.

== Early life ==
Havlish was one of five siblings of Howard Havlish, a full-time worker for the Great Northern Railroad, and Mary (Sheskern) Havlish, who labored part-time for the Internal Revenue Service. At age eight, Havlish was watching the older girls play when the shortstop got hurt. She was given an opportunity to play, and after that she played all the time. "I can't even remember not playing baseball", she recalled in an interview. Havlish added that she started playing baseball in an empty cornfield near her home with all the neighborhood boys. While attending Washington High School, she developed as a multi-talented athlete, playing hockey, football, basketball, baseball and softball and competed in speed skating. She graduated from there to playing organized softball in the playground leagues. "The only thing I could not play was tennis", she acknowledged.

Havlish wound up with the Fort Wayne Daisies in 1952 in a shortstop swap that sent Dottie Schroeder to Kalamazoo. After three tryouts for three different teams, Havlish went back to school and entered the league in 1952 with the Daisies, by then managed by Bill Allington.

== AAGPBL career ==
Havlish played in only a few games for the Daisies in 1952. In 1953, she struggled at the plate, hitting just .189 (64-for-343), but she excelled in the field preventing runs for a team particularly potent on offense.

In the 1953 season, the Daisies outscored their nearest rival by over 100 runs, winning the league title with a 66–39 mark. The explosive bats of Wilma Briggs and the sisters Betty Weaver Foss and Joanne Weaver provided the difference in the league. While Briggs belted a league-lead nine home runs, Joanne led in average (.346) and Betty in runs batted in (81) and stolen bases (80), but Fort Wayne lost for the third consecutive year in the first round, now with the Kalamazoo Lassies, 2-to-1.

In the 1953 All-Star Game, played on July 14 at Memorial Park, the Daisies defeated the All-Star team in an 11-inning effort behind Jean Geissinger, who belted a walk-off home run, and Katie Horstman, whose relief pitching silenced an All-Stars potential rally in the 9th inning.

Havlish improved her offensive and defensive statistics in 1954, when she connected 11 more hits in 67 fewer at-bats for a .254 average (70-for-276), including hitting a home run in three consecutive games. At the field, she committed 18 fewer errors, participated in 14 more double plays, and started a triple play. Notably, she played in 14 fewer games due to an injury, but also had three times as many doubles, 11 more walks and 24 fewer strikeouts (she fanned only 16 times). During what turned out to be the league's final season, Kalamazoo clinched the Championship Title over Fort Wayne, three games to two.

== Awards and recognitions ==
Havlish is included in a Women in Baseball permanent display, which was opened in 1988 at the National Baseball Hall of Fame and Museum in Cooperstown, New York to honor the entire All-American Girls Professional Baseball League rather than any individual player. In 2009, Havlish's glove was accepted by the Hall of Fame as part of the AAGPBL memorabilia.

In 1992, Havlish, Kay Heim and Nancy Mudge, two other Minnesota residents and former AAGPBL players, were invited to throw out the first pitch in a game Angels-Twins played at the Metrodome. The trio also was honored by the Colorado Silver Bullets all-female baseball team in their 1994 inaugural season, in which they threw out the first ball pitch of a game celebrated in Saint Paul.

Additionally, Havlish gained inductions in the Women's International Bowling Congress Hall of Fame in 1987, the Minnesota State Women's Hall of Fame in 1991, the St. Bernard's Athletic Hall of Fame in 2007, and is also a member of the Minnesota Sports Hall of Fame in 1987.

== Career statistics ==
Seasonal Batting Records

Year	GP	AB	R	H	2B	3B	HR	RBI	SB	TB	BB	SO	BA	OBP	SLG	OPS
1952	-	-	-	-	-	-	-	-	-	-	-	-	-	-	-	-
1953	104	344	35	65	4	0	0	22	14	69	69	35	.189	.324	.201	.525
1954	89	276	39	70	13	0	4	36	9	95	95	46	.254	.445	.344	.789

Seasonal Fielding Records

Year	GP	PO	A	E	TC	DP	FA
1952	-	-	-	-	-	-	-
1953	104	395	256	50	701	23	.929
1954	90	143	237	32	412	37	.922
