= Patricia Roy =

American baseball player

- Corner infielder
- Born: October 3, 1938; Goshen, Indiana, U.S.
- Died: May 23, 2017 (aged 78); Ave Maria, Florida, U.S.
- Batted: Right Threw: Right

Teams
- Fort Wayne Daisies (1954)

Patricia Roy (October 3, 1938 – May 23, 2017) was an All-American Girls Professional Baseball League infielder. Listed at 5' 10", 125 lb., she batted and threw right handed.

Patricia Roy played a season in the league but her career was cut short after an insurance company refused to cover players under the age of 18.

Born in Goshen, Indiana, Patricia was the daughter of Arthur and Margaret Roy. She grew up in Harlan, Indiana, near Fort Wayne, and participated in pick-up games and sandlot ball with the boys before joining an organized Pony League baseball team. But after surpassing her male counterparts, Patricia was told that girls could not play in that league. She then went to the Junior Girls Baseball League located at South Bend, which served as a farm club for the All-American league.

In 1954, Roy was noticed and recruited by an AAGPBL scout. She was aged 15 and still in high school, but she convinced her parents she was old enough to play in the league. Patricia was offered a contract and it was co-signed by her mother. By that time, the Fort Wayne Daisies club was short of players and gave the young girl a chance to play. Usually the AAGPBL hired older girls, but made an exception because of the shortage of talent at a difficult time.

But Roy did not get much of a chance to play during the only season she was with the pennant-winning Daisies. She was used sparingly as a backup infielder for Betty Foss at first base and Katie Horstman at third, until a 16-year old teammate, Shirley Weierman, broke an ankle while sliding into second base. After Weierman's injury, the insurance company hired by the league decided it not cover any girl under age 18. Roy and Weierman were released immediately.

In one season career, Roy hit .079 (3-for-38) with two RBI in 14 games. At the field, she recorded 95 putouts with two assists and turned one double plays, while committing five errors in 179 total chances for a combined .951 fielding average.

Following her graduation at Harlan High School in 1956, Roy enrolled at Ball State University and earned a bachelor's and master's degrees in physical education in 1960. She began her career as a physical education teacher at Chesterton High School in 1960, and served as head of the Department of Girls Physical Education at East Gary from 1964 through 1971. In between, she threw fastpitch softball for the Valparaiso Queens team and travelled all over the Midwest.

Afterwards, Roy became a pioneer for girls athletics in Indiana when she was hired by the Indiana High School Athletic Association in 1972. Her first role in the IHSAA was as director of the girls' athletics department, a position that did not exist before her arrival. As a result, Roy established the guidelines for the tournament series for all sports for girls in Indiana and guided the IHSAA girls basketball team to its first championship. She lasted 27½ years at the IHSSA, the longest tenure for an executive in the organization's history.

In 1988, Roy received further recognition when she became part of Women in Baseball, a permanent display based at the Baseball Hall of Fame and Museum in Cooperstown, New York, which was unveiled to honor the entire All-American Girls Professional Baseball League rather than any individual figure.

She garnered numerous honors, starting with the Indiana Hall of Fame Pioneer of the Game Award and the St. Vincent Silver Medal Award in 2002 for her significant role in the implementation into the IHSAA program. In addition, she was recognized nationally by the Women's Sports Foundation and the U.S. Olympic Committee, received the first Marian Archer Award and ICGSA Service Award from the Indiana Coaches of Girls Sports Association, commissioned a Kentucky Colonel in 1993, and was named a Sagamore of the Wabash by the Governor of Indiana Evan Bayh in 1994. She gained inductions in the Indiana Basketball Hall of Fame, the Indiana Softball Hall of Fame, the Indiana Volleyball Hall o Fame, the Lake Station Hall of Fame, and the Indiana Coaches of Sports Association. Besides, the Patricia L Roy Mental Attitude Award is given annually to one senior player in each class of the Indiana State Girls High School Basketball Championship who best exemplifies a positive attitude, scholarship and leadership skills.

After retiring, Patricia Roy moved to Ave Maria, Florida, where she died on May 23, 2017, at the age of 78.
