= Carol Brown =

Carol Brown may refer to:

- Carol Brown (actor) (born 1941), Italian actor whose real name is Bruno Carotenuto
- Carol Brown (arts administrator), president and CEO of the Pittsburgh Cultural Trust
- Carol Brown (baseball), All-American Girls Professional Baseball League player
- Carol Brown (Neighbours), a fictional character from the soap opera Neighbours
- Carol Brown (physician), physician at Memorial Sloan Kettering Cancer Center
- Carol Brown (politician) (born 1963), Australian politician
- Carol Brown (rower) (born 1953), American Olympic rower
- Carol K. Brown (born 1945), American artist
- Carol Brown, alleged nickname of Assata Shakur
- "Carol Brown", a song by Flight of the Conchords featured in the episode "Unnatural Love" of their TV series
