= Alice Blaski =

- Outfield
- Born: February 15, 1930; Wallingford, Connecticut, U.S.
- Died: March 31, 1974 (aged 44)
- Batted: Right Threw: Right

Teams
- Fort Wayne Daisies (1953–1954)

Alice Blaski (February 15, 1930 – March 31, 1974) was an American outfielder who played in the All-American Girls Professional Baseball League (AAGPBL). She batted and threw right-handed.

Born in Wallingford, Connecticut, Blaski graduated from Lyman Hall High School in 1948. She was just one of the two women from Connecticut who joined the AAGPBL during its 12-year history. Edith Barney, who was born in Bridgeport, was the other.

Blaski entered the league in 1953 with the Fort Wayne Daisies, playing for them two years as a backup outfielder for Wilma Briggs (LF), Jean Geissinger (CF) and Joanne Weaver (RF). The Daisies, with Bill Allington at the helm, won the title in both years but struggled in the post-season.

Since 1988 Blaski is part of Women in Baseball, a permanent display based at the Baseball Hall of Fame and Museum in Cooperstown, New York, which was unveiled to honor the entire All-American Girls Professional Baseball League rather than individual baseball personalities.

== Statistics ==
Batting

GP	AB	R	H	2B	3B	HR	RBI	SB	TB	BA	SLG
92	306	68	69	5	4	5	31	23	97	.225	.317

Fielding

PO	A	E	TC	FA
111	10	6	127	.954
