= Mava Lee Thomas =

American baseball player

- Third base/Catcher
- Born: September 1, 1929; Ocala, Florida, U.S.
- Died: August 6, 2013 (aged 83); Ocala, Florida, U.S.
- Batted: Both Threw: Right

Teams
- Fort Wayne Daisies (1951)

Mava Lee Thomas [′′Tommie′′] (September 1, 1929 – August 6, 2013) was an infielder and catcher who played in the All-American Girls Professional Baseball League (AAGPBL). She was a switch-hitter and threw right-handed.

Born in Ocala, Florida, Mava Lee Thomas was the only player in AAGPBL history whose father played in Major League Baseball. Her father, Herb Thomas, was a center fielder/second baseman for the Boston Braves and New York Giants in parts of three seasons spanning 1924–1927.

In the fourth grade, Thomas learned her baseball skills from her father, who taught her the importance of competition, practice, adversity, and teamwork. ′′Tommie′′, as her father dubbed her, attended several schools while growing up in Florida because Mr. Thomas worked as a coach and scout for the Giants organization. She heard about the AAGPBL while attending Ocala High School, where she played for the VFW team.

The AAGPBL operated from 1943 to 1954 and gave over 600 women athletes the opportunity to play professional baseball and to play it at a level never before attained. The league was conceived by Philip K. Wrigley during World War II, under the idea of initiating the innovative project to maintain interest in baseball as the military draft was depleting major-league rosters of first-line players and attendance declined at ballparks around the country.

After graduating from school, Thomas attended an AAGPBL tryout at Fort Wayne, Indiana. The switch-hitter made the grade and joined the Fort Wayne Daisies for the 1951 season. Thomas earned $75 per week plus expenses with the Daisies, which was a considerable amount of money in those days, even though the girls played six nights a week and a doubleheader on Sundays. She was mostly used as a backup for Mary Rountree (C) and Jean Weaver (3B).

At the end of the season, Thomas became concerned that poor attendance indicated an uncertain future for the league. Then, she was determined to continue playing ball and went into the US Navy to play in the female softball team, serving also as a member of the Armed Forces Recreation Society. After discharge in 1953, she played exhibition games for the Hagerstown Mollies of Maryland during two years. She got married in 1953, but the marriage lasted only two years.

Thomas also finished a degree in recreation at the University of Florida and went to work for the Ocala Parks and Recreation Department in 1984, helping to establish such events as Light Up Ocala and the annual fishing derby at Tuscawilla Park, before retiring in 1995.

In 1988, Thomas received further recognition when she became part of Women in Baseball, a permanent display based at the Baseball Hall of Fame and Museum in Cooperstown, New York, which was unveiled to honor the entire All-American Girls Professional Baseball League. In addition, Thomas and her father became the only father/daughter combination to be inducted into the Florida Baseball Hall of Fame.

The AAGPBL folded in 1954. Lady pitchers, catchers, and fielders drifted into obscurity until 1992 when the film A League of Their Own was released. The film kindled a renewed interest in these trailblazers who have their own places in American history. While the film does not use real names, filmmaker Penny Marshall seemed to be aiming for realism, as her work includes fake newsreel footage and pseudo-documentary present day scenes at the beginning and end of the fictitious story. Since then, Thomas and her teammates have become the darlings of the media. They have been honored several times for their significant contributions, responding to request for autographs and corresponding with young athletes interested in hearing of their days in the AAGPBL.

Thomas felt proud to be the only girl ball player with a major league father. She remembered him into playing an old-timers game in 1988 when he was 87 years old. He had spike scars on his arm from Ty Cobb, she explained in an interview.

Tommie Thomas died in 2013 in her homeland of Ocala, Florida at the age of 83, following complication from Alzheimer's disease.
