= Shirley Crites =

- Infielder
- Born: August 21, 1934; Cape Girardeau, Missouri, U.S.
- Died: December 28, 1990 (aged 56); Phoenix, Arizona, U.S.
- Batted: Right Threw: Right
- Stats at Baseball Reference

Teams
- Fort Wayne Daisies (1953)

Career highlights and awards
- Postseason appearance (1953); Women in Baseball – AAGPBL Permanent Display at Baseball Hall of Fame and Museum (1988)

Shirley L. Crites (August 21, 1934 – December 28, 1990) was an American baseball infielder who played in the All-American Girls Professional Baseball League (AAGPBL) during the 1953 season. Crites batted and threw right-handed. She was born in Cape Girardeau, Missouri.

"Squirrely", as her teammates nicknamed her, played briefly for the 1953 pennant-winning Fort Wayne Daisies. She hit a .129 average in 47 games, appearing mainly at third base as a backup to incumbent Catherine Horstman, which gave manager Bill Allington the chance to use Horstman more as a pitcher.

Fort Wayne clinched the title with a 66–39 record, 4½ games ahead of the Grand Rapids Chicks, but lost to the Kalamazoo Lassies in the first round series. Crites went 0-for-3 in a playoff game.

Crites is part of Women in Baseball, a permanent display based at the Baseball Hall of Fame and Museum in Cooperstown, New York, which was unveiled in 1988 to honor the entire All-American Girls Professional Baseball League.

She died in 1990 in Phoenix, Arizona, at the age of 56.

== Career statistics ==
Batting

GP	AB	R	H	2B	3B	HR	RBI	SB	TB	BB	SO	BA	OBP	SLG
47	132	15	17	3	1	0	11	7	22	15	17	.129	.218	.145

Fielding

GP	PO	A	E	TC	DP	FA
20	41	92	11	144	5	.924
