= Beverly Armstrong =

American pitcher (1934–2025)

- Pitcher
- Born: September 27, 1934; Maywood, New Jersey, U.S.
- Died: July 15, 2025 (aged 90); Maywood, New Jersey, U.S.
- Batted: Right Threw: Right

Teams
- Rockford Peaches (1952)

Beverly Armstrong Steuert (September 27, 1934 – July 15, 2025) was an American pitcher who played in the All-American Girls Professional Baseball League (AAGPBL). She batted and threw right-handed. Sometimes she is credited as Bev Steuert.

== Biography ==
A native of Maywood, New Jersey, Armstrong began to play at age 10 in the backyard with her father, a semi-professional baseball player who taught her how to pitch and knew all about the baseball game. She later developed a strong fastball and a decent curve.

Armstrong entered the league in 1952 with the Rockford Peaches, pitching for them in that season while she was still in high school. She posted a 4–1 record in six starts and three relief appearances. Managed by Bill Allington, the Peaches featured top-notch players as Eleanor Callow, Rose Gacioch, Carol Habben, Alice Pollitt and Ruth Richard. The team advanced to the playoffs, only to lose in the first round to the Fort Wayne Daisies.

Unfortunately, in 1953 Armstrong injured an ankle midway through her second season. Due to the AAGPBL folding in 1954, Armstrong went on to play basketball and softball. She later married and raised three children.

In November 1988, the Baseball Hall of Fame and Museum in Cooperstown, New York dedicated a permanent display to the entire league. She lived in Kernersville, North Carolina.

Armstrong died on July 15, 2025, at the age of 90.
