= Jean Smith (baseball) =

American baseball player (1928–2011)

- Outfielder / Relief pitcher
- Born: May 9, 1928; Ann Arbor, Michigan, U.S.
- Died: March 13, 2011 (aged 82); Harbor Springs, Michigan, U.S.

Teams
- Kenosha Comets (1948); Fort Wayne Daisies (1948–1949); Peoria Redwings (1950–1951); Grand Rapids Chicks (1952–1954)

Career highlights and awards
- All-Star Game (1954); Championship Team (1953)

Jean Marie Smith (May 9, 1928 – March 13, 2011) was an outfielder and relief pitcher who played from 1948 through 1954 in the All-American Girls Professional Baseball League (AAGPBL). Listed at 5 ft 6 in (1.68 m), 128. lb, she batted and threw right-handed.

Smith entered the All-American Girls Professional Baseball League in 1948, beginning her career at outfield and later doubling as a reliever until the final season of play in 1954. Regarded as a disciplined hitter and a daring base runner, she posted a robust .334 on-base percentage and a 1.77 walk-to-strikeout ratio, while utilizing her speed to snatch 194 stolen bases in 567 career games. A member of a championship team, she also played in five out of seven possible playoffs.

== Baseball career ==
In 1947 Smith attended a tryout of the All-American Girls Professional Baseball League in Grand Rapids, Michigan. After being selected at a try-out camp in Grand Rapids I was sent a contract in the mail for me to sign and also to be signed with consent with my parents or guardian. Both my parents gave me their permission, she recalled. For her career, Smith was able to play well in all three outfield positions, mainly at center field. She then attended the 1948 spring training in Opa-locka, Florida, and was assigned to the Kenosha Comets.

Smith was sent to the Fort Wayne Daisies during the 1948 midseason, just in time for playoffs, but Fort Wayne lost the first round to the Rockford Peaches, four games to one. She batted a combined .168 average with 36 runs and 22 runs batted in in 104 games.

In 1949 Smith also was used as a relief pitcher, because Daisies manager Dick Bass thought he had a hard fastball and a good curve. I was a thrower and not a pitcher, she admitted. In that season, she collected a 3.38 earned run average in eight innings of work while playing 25 games at outfield. Fort Wayne advanced again to the playoffs, losing to the Grand Rapids Chicks in the best-of-three first round series.

Smith opened 1950 with the Peoria Redwings. She finished with a 2–0 record and a 1.80 ERA in four relief appearances. As a hitter, she went 58–for–267 (.217) with 36 runs and 14 RBI in 89 games, including 10 doubles and three triples, while stealing 12 bases.

Smith had her first good season in 1951, collecting a .233 average with 10 doubles and 38 stolen bases, driving in 30 runs while scoring 50 times in 93 games. She made 18 appearances on the mound, posting a 7–7 record and a 2.92 ERA in a career-high 111 innings.

For the next three years Smith played for the Grand Rapids Chicks, a strong team managed by Woody English, which included talented players as Jean Geissinger, Pepper Paire, Doris Satterfield, Dorothy Stolze, Connie Wisniewski and Alma Ziegler. Smith shared outfield duties with Geissinger, Satterfield and Wisniewski, hitting .196 in 46 games while going 1–2 as a reliever. Grand Rapids advanced to the playoffs, but was swept by the South Bend Blue Sox in the best-of-three series on strong pitching by Jean Faut.

Smith had a solid season in 1953, hitting .227 with 73 stolen bases and a .343 OBP in a career-high 114 games, being surpassed only by Fort Wayne's Betty Foss for the most stolen bases (80). She also posted career numbers in hits (91), runs (86), doubles (20), triples (5) and steals, while walking 71 times and tying for third in doubles. In the best-of-three first round series, third place Kalamazoo Lassies disposed of first place Fort Wayne, and second place Grand Rapids drew fourth place Rockford. In the best-of-three final series, Grand Rapids swept Kalamazoo behind complete game victories by Mary Lou Studnicka and Earlene Risinger. In Game 1, Studnicka limited the Lassies to seven hits in a 7–2 victory, while Risinger drove in two runs and struck out nine to whip Kalamazoo, 4–3, in a cold weather, shortened seven-inning game. Smith went 3–for–10 and scored a run in the finals. In her final season of 1954, Smith batted .252 (78–for–309) with nine triples, three home runs 56 RBI and 88 walks, all career numbers. She also scored 74 runs and stole 28 bases, while collecting a notable .397 on-base percentage in 88 game appearances. Fort Wayne repeated the regular season title and faced Grand Rapids in the first round of the playoffs, while second place South Bend played fourth place Kalamazoo. As a member of the champion team, Davis played in the All-Star Game against an All-Stars team selected by the league's managers. Fort Wayne and Kalamazoo defeated their respective opponents and advanced to the best-of-five final series.

=== 1954 championship ===
In Game 1 of the best-of-five series, the Kalamazoo Lassies defeated the Fort Wayne Daisies 17–9 behind a four-hit, seven strong innings from June Peppas, who also helped herself by hitting 2–for–4, including one home run. Her teammates Carol Habben and Fern Shollenberger also slugged one each, and Chris Ballingall belted a grand slam. Pitching star Maxine Kline, who had posted an 18–7 record with 3.23 ERA for the Daisies during the regular season, gave up 11 runs in six innings and was credited with the loss. Katie Horstman connected two home runs for the Daisies in a lost cause, and her teammate Joanne Weaver slugged one.

The Daisies bounced back in Game 2, hitting five home runs against the Lassies to win, 11–4. Horstman started the feat with a two-run home run to open the score in the first inning. In the rest of the game, Betty Weaver Foss added two homers with five RBI, while her sister Joanne and Geissinger added solo shots. Peppas, Nancy Mudge and Dorothy Schroeder homered for Kalamazoo.

In Game 3, the Daisies won the Lassies, 8–7, fueled again by a heavy hitting by Joanne Weaver, who hit a double, a triple and a three-run home run in five at bats, driving in four runs.

In Game 4, starter Gloria Cordes helped Kalamazoo to tie the series, pitching a complete game victory over the Daisies, 6–5. Habben drove in two runs who marked the difference, while Kline suffered her second loss of the Series.

In decisive Game 5, Peppas pitched a clutch complete game and went 3–for–5 with an RBI against her former Daisies team, winning by an 8–5 margin to give the Lassies the Championship title in the AAGPBL's last ever game. She received support from Balingall (3–for–4) and Schroeder, who drove in the winning run in the bottom of the eight inning. Peppas finished with a .450 average in the Series and collected two of the three Lassies victories, to become the winning pitcher of the last game in the twelve-year history of the league.

=== Bill Allington All-Stars ===
When the league was unable to continue in 1955, Smith joined several other players selected by former Daisies manager Bill Allington to play in the national touring team known as the All-Americans All-Stars. The team played 100 games, each booked in a different town, against male teams, while traveling over 10,000 miles in the manager's station wagon and a Ford Country Sedan. Besides Smith, the Allington All-Stars included players as Joan Berger, Gloria Cordes, Jeanie Descombes, Gertrude Dunn, Betty Foss, Mary Froning, Jean Geissinger, Katie Horstman, Maxine Kline, Dolores Lee, Magdalen Redman, Ruth Richard, Dorothy Schroeder, Dolly Vanderlip and Joanne Weaver, among others.

== Life after baseball ==
Following her baseball career, Smith settled down in Harbor Springs, Michigan, where she worked as a secretary at the Harbor Springs IGA and as a bookkeeper for Woodland Buildersand. She also mowed the meadows at Barnyard Golf on her John Deere tractor until retirement in 1992.

Since 1980, Peppas and a group of friends began assembling a list of names and addresses of former AAGPBL players. Her work turned into a newsletter that resulted in the league's first-ever reunion in Chicago, Illinois in 1982. Starting from that reunion, a Players Association was formed five years later and many former AAGPBL players continued to enjoy reunions, which became annual events in 1998. Smith attended the first reunion and regained communication with her teammates and old friends. Of the approximately 560 women who had played in the league, most had lost touch with the others, at least not until the reunion held in Chicago. The association was largely responsible for the opening of an AAGPBL permanent display at the Baseball Hall of Fame and Museum at Cooperstown, New York, opened in 1988, which is dedicated to the entire league rather than any individual personalities. Smith, along with the rest of the league's girls, is now enshrined in the Hall.

Jean Smith died in Harbor Springs, Michigan at the age of 82, following a brief illness.

== Career statistics ==
Batting

GP	AB	R	H	2B	3B	HR	RBI	SB	BB	SO	BA	OBP	SLG
567	1853	320	396	67	18	13	174	194	333	188	.215	.334	.290

Pitching

GP	W	L	W-L%	ERA	IP	H	RA	ER	BB	SO	WHIP
39	10	10	.500	3.61	172	137	92	69	129	45	1.55

Outfield fielding

GP	PO	A	E	TC	DP	FA
538	953	78	47	1078	15	.987

Playoff hitting

GP	AB	R	H	2B	3B	HR	RBI	SB
21	63	9	6	1	0	0	0	6
