= Alta Little =

- First base / Pitcher
- Born: May 21, 1923; Gas City, Indiana, U.S.
- Died: March 10, 1999 (aged 75); Dallas, Texas, U.S.
- Batted: Right Threw: Right

Teams
- Muskegon Lassies (1947); Fort Wayne Daisies (1948)

Career highlights and awards
- Women in Baseball – AAGPBL Permanent Display at Baseball Hall of Fame and Museum (since 1988)

Alta Lucille Little (May 21, 1923 – March 10, 1999) was an American first sacker and pitcher who played from 1947 to 1948 in the All-American Girls Professional Baseball League (AAGPBL). She batted and threw right handed.

Born in Gas City, Indiana, Little grew up in Muskegon, Michigan, where her sisters played on a softball team. She wanted to play along with her sisters, but the team's coach said her that she was too young. As luck would have it, one day the team was short of players and she received a chance to play at the age of 11. She then formed part of the regular lineup thereafter.

In 1947, Little was playing in a Muskegon factory league when an AAGPBL scout signed her to a contract, as she went to Opa-locka, Florida for spring training. She was assigned to her home team, Muskegon Lassies, but she was never given enough playing time because already the Lassies had the slick-fielding Sara Reeser at first base. She then was reassigned to the Fort Wayne Daisies the next season and the same thing happened, as they used outstanding first sacker Betty Foss. Unable to crack the lineup as a regular, Little decided to leave the league. In a sixteen-game career, she collected six hits in 47 at-bats for a .128 batting average. She also made one pitching appearance.

After baseball, Little she went into managing bowling lanes. She eventually moved to Dallas, Texas and became the director of operations for Don Carter's All Star Lanes.

Little is part of the AAGPBL permanent display at the Baseball Hall of Fame and Museum in Cooperstown, New York opened in 1988, which is dedicated to the entire league rather than any individual figure.

In 1995, she was invited to Arlington Stadium to throw out the ceremonial first pitch before a game between the home Texas Rangers and the Oakland Athletics.

Little was a long time resident of Dallas, Texas, where she died in 1999 at the age of 75.
