= Donna Norris =

Donna Norris may refer to:

- Donna Norris (child safety campaigner), mother of Amber Hagerman, namesake of the AMBER Alert
- Donna Norris (baseball) (1934–2013), All-American Girls Professional Baseball League player
