= Helen Ketola =

American baseball player

- Third base
- Born: September 30, 1931; Quincy, Massachusetts, U.S.
- Died: December 1, 2016 (aged 85); Edgewater, Florida, U.S.
- Batted: Right Threw: Right

Teams
- Fort Wayne Daisies (1950)

Career highlights and awards
- Women in Baseball – AAGPBL Permanent Display at the Baseball Hall of Fame and Museum (unveiled in 1988)

Helen Julia Ketola [LaCamera] (September 30, 1931 – December 1, 2016) was an American All-American Girls Professional Baseball League player. Listed at 5' 4", 109 lb., Ketola batted and threw right handed. She was dubbed 'Pee Wee' by her teammates.

Born in Quincy, Massachusetts, Helen Ketola used to play sandlot ball with the local boys at age nine before joining a softball team in Quincy High School as a sophomore. She first heard about the All American League by her gym teacher, Mary Pratt, who had played in the league in the mid-1940s.

Pratt convinced Ketola and took her to an All American League tryout held in Everett, MA, where she competed with around 400 girls trying the join the league. She survived the final cut and was assigned to the Fort Wayne Daisies, which was managed by former big leaguer Max Carey.

Helen was slated at third base and played on a regular basis, until outstanding Betty Foss arrived with her powerful bat and capable defensive skills and she was relegated to the bench.

In one-season career, Ketola hit .131 (8-for-61) with nine RBI and eight runs in 31 games. At third base, she recorded 20 putouts with 48 assists and turned six double plays, while committing eight errors in 76 total chances for a .895 fielding average.

Nevertheless, the team sent her a contract the next season, but she did not return because she met her future husband, Joseph LaCamera, and stayed in Massachusetts instead. They married in 1955 and had two children, Paul and Jean.

Afterwards, she worked as school bus driver while her children were in school. After her children grew up and left home, Helen retired and moved with her spouse to Edgewater, Florida. While there, she coached softball and returned to driving a school bus. She was an accomplished candlepin bowler and golfer. Helen enjoyed being behind the wheel of her car, and as her annual journey from Florida to Massachusetts to visit family and friends in the summer was a subject of much family debate. Notably, she would drive up north solo well into her seventies.

In 1988, Helen Ketola received further recognition when she became part of Women in Baseball, a permanent display based at the Baseball Hall of Fame and Museum in Cooperstown, New York, which was unveiled to honor the entire All-American Girls Professional Baseball League rather than any individual figure.

She died in 2016 in Edgewater, Florida, at the age of 85.
