= Alice Hoover =

American baseball player

- Second base / Third base
- Born: October 27, 1928; Reading, Pennsylvania, U.S.
- Died: December 10, 2014 (aged 86); Reading, Pennsylvania, U.S.
- Batted: Right Threw: Right

Teams
- Fort Wayne Daisies (1948)

Career highlights and awards
- Women in Baseball – AAGPBL Permanent Display at the Baseball Hall of Fame and Museum (since 1988)

Alice Hoover (October 27, 1928 – December 10, 2014) was an American backup infielder who played in the All-American Girls Professional Baseball League (AAGPBL). Listed at 4’ 11”, 105 lb., Hoover batted and threw right-handed. She was dubbed Pee Wee or Sniffle.

Born in Reading, Pennsylvania, the diminutive Alice Hoover started playing organized softball at age 14 with the local Kaufmann Maids team. She was signed by the league before the 1948 season and was assigned to the Fort Wayne Daisies, where she did not see much action. She appeared in just six games and went hitless in four at-bats.

In 1949, Hoover decided not to go back to the league. Instead, she went to work in a shirt factory production line for the next 33 years. Afterwards, she switched careers and worked for Western Electric, the primary supplier to AT&T, for nearly 16 years. She retired in 1993.

Following her retirement, Hoover actively participated in a number of events coordinated by the AAGPBL Players Association. She was among those present in November 1988, when the Baseball Hall of Fame and Museum inaugurated a permanent display at Cooperstown, New York, that honors the league's girls as well as the entire staff.

Alice Hoover died in 2014 at the age of 86 in her home in Reading, Pennsylvania.
