= Sarah Mavis Dabbs =

American baseball player

- Outfield
- Born: March 10, 1922; Largo, Florida, U.S.
- Died: May 14, 2000 (aged 78); St. Petersburg, Florida, U.S.
- Batted: Right Threw: Right

Teams
- Fort Wayne Daisies (1947)

Career highlights and awards
- Women in Baseball – AAGPBL Permanent Display at Baseball Hall of Fame and Museum (1988)

Sarah Mavis Dabbs (March 10, 1922 – May 14, 2000) was a fourth outfielder who played in the All-American Girls Professional Baseball League (AAGPBL). Listed at 5' 5", 130 lb., she batted and threw right handed.

Sarah Dabbs played softball in her home state of Florida during ten years before joining the league. From 1940 to 1941, she demonstrated her role as catcher and cleanup hitter for the R. H. Hall team of St. Petersburg that won the Florida women's softball in consecutive years.

Dabbs served as a backup outfielder for the Fort Wayne Daisies during the 1947 season, playing briefly for them while collecting a .091 batting average in 12 games. She is remembered for making several sparkling running catches at outfield and for taking some timely hitting for the Daisies.

In 1988, Dabbs received further recognition when she became part of Women in Baseball, a permanent display based at the Baseball Hall of Fame and Museum in Cooperstown, New York, which was unveiled to honor the entire All-American Girls Professional Baseball League.

== Batting statistics ==
GP	AB	R	H	2B	3B	HR	RBI	SB	TB	BB	SO	BA	OBP	SLG
12	22	0	2	0	0	0	1	1	2	2	1	.091	.167	.091
