= Mary Weddle =

American baseball player (1934–2021)

- Pitcher / Infield/outfield utility
- Born: April 26, 1934; Woodsfield, Ohio, U.S.
- Died: October 31, 2021 (aged 87); Corbin, Kentucky, U.S.
- Batted: Right Threw: Right

Teams
- Fort Wayne Daisies (1954)

Mary Weddle [Hines] (April 26, 1934 - October 31, 2021) was a former pitcher and utility infielder/outfielder who played in the All-American Girls Professional Baseball League (AAGPBL) during the 1954 season. Listed at 5 ft 3 in (1.60 m), 118 lb, she batted and threw right-handed.

Nicknamed "Giggles," Weddle proved to be a valuable utility and spot starter during what turned out to be the AAGPBL final season, adding depth at both shortstop and outfield and pitching a complete-game one-hitter.

Born in Woodsfield, Ohio, Weddle grew up in a farm and came from a large family of ten brothers and four sisters that had its own baseball team, the Weddle Auctioneers, while her father was a semi-professional pitcher. Weddle played shortstop for a boys baseball team in junior high, but she was not allowed to play with them in high school. She then joined a VFW softball team. She also played softball for the A-1 Queens in Phoenix, Arizona in 1953, before entering the AAGPBL with the Fort Wayne Daisies in 1954.

Weddle posted a 3–1 record and a 3.83 earned run average in 15 pitching appearances, while hitting a .216 average with a .323 on-base percentage in 76 games. The Daisies, with Bill Allington at the helm, clinched the regular season title and defeated the Grand Rapids in the best-of-three first round, but lost to the Kalamazoo Lassies in the final round, three games to two. She went 5-for-24 for a .208 average in six playoff games, including one stolen base and five runs scored.

Weddle married Lewis Hines in 1955, and had three children and five grandchildren. She later played softball for more than thirty years and coached softball at high school and middle school for nine years.

She is part of Women in Baseball, a permanent display at the Baseball Hall of Fame and Museum at Cooperstown, New York unveiled in 1988, which is dedicated to the entire All-American Girls Professional Baseball League.

Weddle died on October 31, 2021.

== Career statistics ==
Pitching

GP	W	L	W-L%	ERA	IP	H	RA	ER	BB	SO	WHIP
15	3	1	.750	3.83	47	23	30	20	60	21	1.77

Batting

GP	AB	R	H	2B	3B	HR	RBI	SB	TB	BB	SO	BA	OBP	SLG
76	241	38	52	6	2	2	21	5	68	38	37	.216	.323	.282

Collective fielding

GP	PO	A	E	TC	DP	FA
76	53	87	21	161	11	.130
