= Gloria Cordes =

American baseball player (1931–2018)

- Pitcher
- Born: September 21, 1931; Staten Island, New York, U.S.
- Died: March 13, 2018 (aged 86); Staten Island, New York, U.S.
- Batted: Right Threw: Right

Teams
- Muskegon Lassies (1950); Kalamazoo Lassies (1950, 1951–'54); Racine Belles (1950); Battle Creek Belles (1950–'51)

Career highlights and awards
- Two-time All-Star Team (1952, 1954); Championship Title (1954); Two playoff appearances (1953-'54); Women in Baseball – AAGPBL Permanent Display Baseball Hall of Fame and Museum (1988)

Gloria Cordes Elliott (September 21, 1931 – March 13, 2018) was an American starting pitcher who played from 1950 through 1954 in the All-American Girls Professional Baseball League (AAGPBL). Listed at 5' 8", 138 lb., she batted and threw right-handed.

== Overview profile ==
Gloria Cordes was one of 25 players who made the All-American Girls Professional Baseball League clubs hailed from New York City and State, including Muriel Bevis, Mildred Deegan, Nancy Mudge, Betty Trezza and Margaret Wigiser. Cordes pitched in the last five seasons of the All-American Girls Professional Baseball League, primarily with the Kalamazoo Lassies. A hard-thrower and extremely competitive, she overcame control problems early in her career to become one of the most consistent overhand pitchers of the league. She was adversely affected by frequently moving from one city to another, totaling five moves in her first two seasons before settling in Kalamazoo for the rest of her career.

== Early life ==
A native of Staten Island, New York, Cordes was one of eleven children, having five sisters and five brothers. At the age of eleven she began playing baseball with her brothers, learning the basics of the game, but intermittently, because there were no teams for girls. Nevertheless, she was determined to play well and continued to practice whenever she could.

In 1948, the Springfield Sallies and Chicago Colleens were added to the roster of the All-American Girls Professional Baseball League (AAGPBL). Both teams had a lousy year and lost their franchises by the end of the season. For the next two years, the Colleens and Sallies became rookie training teams that played exhibition games and recruited new talent as they toured through the South and East. When the teams stopped for an exhibition game at Yankee Stadium in 1949, Cordes tried out for the league and was invited to another tryout in South Bend, Indiana, the following year. She attended the invitation and was assigned to the Muskegon Lassies.

== AAGPBL career ==
At 19 age, Cordes entered the league in 1950 with the Lassies, based in Muskegon, Michigan. She pitched in nine games and was 0–5 on a team made up mainly of rookies from the traveling teams. It was a very bad season for the Lassies, who relocated to Kalamazoo, Michigan, in the middle of the year, and posted the worst record of the league with 36 wins, 73 losses and two ties. Although never credited with a no-hitter in the midseason because the contest ended in a 0–0 tie, she later defeated the South Bend Blue Sox, 1–0, behind a two-hit shutout. After pitching in the two cities, she joined the Racine Belles late in the season. She combined for a 5–10 record with a 3.63 earned run average, giving up 76 walks while striking out just 23 in 119 innings of work. Cordes stayed with the Belles when the team moved from Racine, Wisconsin, to Battle Creek, Michigan, for the 1951 season, but was sent back to the Lassies during the midseason. She finished 1951 with a solid 3.63 ERA, despite her 3–15 record for two helpless teams.

Cordes enjoyed a career year in 1952, pitching 34 consecutive scoreless innings and going the whole season without ever being relieved in her 24 starts. She finished with a 16–8 record and a 1.44 ERA and lowered drastically her numbers of the previous season, cutting her walks from 96 to 52, by increasing her strikeouts from 70 to 84, and allowing 12 fewer hits (168 to 156) in 34 more innings (179 to 213). Besides this, she finished fifth in the league in innings, third in strikeouts, sixth in wins and second in ERA to Jean Faut, who set an all-time, single-season record of 0.93 (.51 ahead of Cordes).

Cordes also appeared in the 1952 midseason All-Star Game as a member of the All-Star Team, which faced the South Bend Blue Sox, the league's 1951 playoff champions. The All-Stars prevailed, 7–6, when Betty Foss scored the eventual winning run on an RBI-single by Doris Sams in the top of the 9th inning. Then Cordes retired South Bend in the bottom of the ninth to earn the save. Kalamazoo improved to a 49–61 record in that season.

When the 1953 season opened, Cordes felt more confident about her game. She won three of the first four victories of Kalamazoo, already achieving her wins mark from the previous season. By then, she depended on a good fastball and a curve, but also possessed a knuckler that baffled opposite hitters who tried to analyze her pitches. Cordes finished 13–11 with 106 strikeouts and a 1.98 ERA, and again ranked among the leaders in ERA (3rd), strikeouts (5th), complete games (20, tied for 8th), shutouts (six, 2nd) and innings pitched (218, 10th). In the first round of the playoffs, Kalamazoo defeated the Fort Wayne Daisies and advanced to the best-of-three game Championship Series only to lost to the Grand Rapids Chicks, 2–0.

In her last season, Cordes went 12–7 with 86 strikeouts and a 4.58 ERA, ending in fourth place both in strikeouts and wins (tied). She was rewarded with her second All-Star berth and a trip to the best-of-five game Championship Series. Previously in the playoffs, Kalamazoo dispatched South Bend in three games and the Daisies did the same with the Chicks.

== 1954 Championship Title ==
In Game 1 of the AAGPBL Series, the Kalamazoo Lassies defeated the Fort Wayne Daisies 17-9 behind a four-hit, seven strong innings from June Peppas, who also helped herself by hitting 2-for-4, including one home run. Her teammates Carol Habben and Fern Shollenberger also slugged one each, and Chris Ballingall belted a grand slam. Pitching star Maxine Kline, who had posted an 18–7 record with 3.23 ERA for the Daisies during the regular season, gave up 11 runs in six innings and was credited with the loss. Katie Horstman connected two home runs for the Daisies in a lost cause, and her teammate Joanne Weaver slugged one.

Cordes started for the Lassies in Game 2, which featured seven home runs by the two teams. In Game 3 the Daisies won a close one, 8–7. Cordes relieved with the bases loaded in the seventh inning, but did not allow any damage for the remainder of the game. Cordes started Game 4 of the series with her team against the wall, 2-to-1. This time properly warmed up, she pitched a complete game, allowing five runs on nine hits, to help Kalamazoo to tie the series. Habben drove in two runs who marked the difference, while Kline suffered her second loss of the Series.

In decisive Game 5, Peppas pitched a clutch complete game and went 3-for-5 with an RBI against her former Daisies team, winning by an 8–5 margin to give the Lassies the Championship title in the AAGPBL's last ever game. She received support from Balingall (3-for-4) and Schroeder, who drove in the winning run in the bottom of the eighth. Peppas finished with a .450 average in the Series and collected two of the three Lassies victories, to become the winning pitcher of the last game in the league's history.

== Bill Allington All-Stars ==
When the league was unable to continue in 1955, Cordes joined several other players selected by former Daisies manager Bill Allington to play in the national touring team known as the All-Americans All-Stars. The team played 100 games, each booked in a different town, against male teams, while traveling over 10,000 miles in the manager's station wagon and a Ford Country Sedan. Besides Cordes, the Allington All-Stars included players as Joan Berger, Jeanie Descombes, Gertrude Dunn, Betty Foss, Jean Geissinger, Katie Horstman, Maxine Kline, Dolores Lee, Magdalen Redman, Ruth Richard, Dorothy Schroeder, Jean Smith, Dolly Vanderlip and Joanne Weaver, among others.

Following her baseball retirement, Cordes coached girls softball and was an active participant in events related to the All-American Girls Professional Baseball League.

Cordes died on March 13, 2018, at the age of 86 in her hometown of Staten Island.

== Pitching statistics ==
GP	W	L	W-L%	ERA	IP	H	R	ER	BB	SO	WHIP
100	49	51	.490	2.82	874	750	422	274	361	369	1.271

== After the league folded ==
=== Bill Allington All-Stars ===
Following her AAGPBL career, Cordes joined several other players on Bill Allington's All-American team, a barnstorming remnant of the league. The team, known as the All-American All-Stars, played 100 games from 1955 through 1957, each booked in a different town, against male semi-pro teams. The girls traveled over 10,000 miles in the manager's station wagon and a Ford Country Sedan. Besides Cordes, the Allington All-Stars included players as Joan Berger, Gertrude Dunn, Betty Foss, Jean Geissinger, Katie Horstman, Maxine Kline, Dolores Lee, Ruth Richard and Dorothy Schroeder, between others.

== See also ==
- List of people from Staten Island § Sports
- Staten Island Sports Hall of Fame
