= Doris Marsh =

American baseball player

- Pitcher
- Born: Elkhart, Indiana, U.S.
- Bats: Right Throws: Right

Teams
- Fort Wayne Daisies (1945)

Doris Marsh was a pitcher who played in the All-American Girls Professional Baseball League (AAGPBL). She batted and threw right handed.

Marsh spent a season with the Fort Wayne Daisies in 1945 and made three pitching appearances. She posted a 0–2 record with a 3.18 ERA in 17.0 innings of work, striking out two, while walking eight and hitting one batter. At the plate, she went hitless in five at-bats.

The AAGPBL folded in 1954, but there is a permanent display at the Baseball Hall of Fame and Museum at Cooperstown, New York, since November 5, 1988, that honors the entire league rather than any individual figure.

== Career statistics ==
Pitching

GP	W	L	W-L%	ERA	IP	RA	ER	BB	SO	HB	WP
3	0	2	.000	3.18	17	10	6	8	2	1	2

Batting

GP	AB	R	H	2B	3B	HR	RBI	SB	BB	SO	BA	OBP
3	5	0	0	0	0	0	0	0	0	0	.000	.000
