= Kathleen Malach =

American baseball player (1926–2011)

- Pinch hitter
- Born: May 30, 1926; Knoxville, Tennessee, U.S.
- Died: December 19, 2011 (aged 85); Louisville, Tennessee, U.S.
- Batted: Right Threw: Right

Teams
- Fort Wayne Daisies (1947)

Kathleen Malach [Webb] (May 30, 1926 – December 19, 2011) was an All-American Girls Professional Baseball League player. Listed at 5' 5", 135 lb., she batted and threw right handed.

Born in Knoxville, Tennessee, Kathleen Malach graduated from Knoxville Catholic High School and shortly thereafter joined the All American League in its 1947 season.

'Kay', as she was dubbed by her teammates, made a pinch-hitting appearance for the Fort Wayne Daisies and went hitless in her only at bat.

Afterwards, Malach had a distinguished fencing career during 24 years, while competing in local and regional tournaments, in Canada as well as in a national competition in New York City. Besides, she served as a fencing instructor at the University of Tennessee for several years.

In between, she retired in 1988 from ORNL in Oak Ridge, Tennessee after 36 years of employment.

Kathleen Malach received further recognition when she became part of Women in Baseball, a permanent display based at the Baseball Hall of Fame and Museum in Cooperstown, New York which was unveiled in 1988 to honor the entire All-American Girls Professional Baseball League.

Malach married Kenneth B. Webb in 1961 and they had three children: Debby Stethen, Wally Pressey and Tony. Kenneth would be her husband for 50 years until his death on November 14, 2011. She died on December 19 of the same year in Louisville, Tennessee, at the age of 85.
