= Meryle Fitzgerald =

American baseball player

- Pitcher
- Born: January 24, 1925; Hutchinson, Minnesota, U.S.
- Died: March 4, 2004 (aged 79); Mitchell, South Dakota, U.S.
- Batted: Right Threw: Right

Teams
- Fort Wayne Daisies (1946)

Career highlights and awards
- Women in Baseball – AAGPBL Permanent Display at the Baseball Hall of Fame and Museum (unveiled in 1988)

Meryle Fitzgerald (later LeClaire; January 24, 1925 – March 4, 2004) was a pitcher who played in the All-American Girls Professional Baseball League (AAGPBL). Fitzgerald batted and threw right handed. She was dubbed 'Pinkey' by her teammates.

Born in Hutchinson, Minnesota to Elmer and Virginia Fitzgerald, she was raised in Rapid City, South Dakota. By the age of 10 she was the mascot/batgirl for a baseball team coached by her father. Meryle was 21 when she joined the Fort Wayne Daisies in 1946, but she did not have much of a chance to play during the season. She made two pitching appearances, but additional information is incomplete because there are no records available at the time of the request.

In 1988, a permanent display was inaugurated at the Baseball Hall of Fame and Museum at Cooperstown, New York, that honors those who were part of the All-American Girls Professional Baseball League. Meryle Fitzgerald is included at the display/exhibit. She later was inducted into the South Dakota Sports Hall of Fame.
