= Dorothy Cook =

Canadian baseball player

- Infield Utility
- Born: St. Catharines, Ontario, Canada
- Bats: Right Throws: Right

Teams
- Fort Wayne Daisies (1946); Rockford Peaches (1946)

Career highlights and awards
- Women in Baseball – AAGPBL Permanent Display at Baseball Hall of Fame and Museum (since 1988); Canadian Baseball Hall of Fame Honorary Induction (1998)

Dorothy Cook was a Canadian infielder who played in the All-American Girls Professional Baseball League (AAGPBL) during its 1946 season. She batted and threw right handed.

Born in St. Catharines, Ontario, Cook was one of the 68 players born in Canada to enter the AAGPBL in its twelve-year history. She joined the league as their backup shortstop for the Fort Wayne Daisies and the Rockford Peaches while appearing in 14 games. In one-season-career, Cook went hitless in 24 at bats and drove in two runs with one stolen base.

The AAGPBL folded in 1954, but there is a permanent display at the Baseball Hall of Fame and Museum at Cooperstown, New York, since November 5, 1988, that honours the entire league rather than any individual figure. In 1998, Cook and all Canadian AAGPBL ballplayers gained honorary induction into the Canadian Baseball Hall of Fame.
