= Jean Weaver =

- Pitcher / Third base
- Born: August 28, 1933; Metropolis, Illinois, U.S.
- Died: January 18, 2008 (aged 74); Metropolis, Illinois, U.S.
- Batted: Right Threw: Right

Teams
- Fort Wayne Daisies

Jean Weaver (August 28, 1933 – January 18, 2008) was a utility player who played from 1951 through 1953 in the All-American Girls Professional Baseball League (AAGPBL). Listed at 5' 8", 138 lb., Weaver batted and threw right-handed. She was born in Metropolis, Illinois. Her sisters Betty and Joanne also played in the league.

Jean was one of the famous Weaver sisters of the Fort Wayne Daisies during the last years of the All-American Girls Professional Baseball League. Her older sister Betty won the batting title in both 1950 and 1951, and earned the Most Valuable Player award in 1952. Younger sister Joanne took three consecutive batting titles from 1952 to 1954, the last with a season-record .429 average which gave her MVP honors. Jean was a dependable utility with good instincts for the game. She played three years for the Daisies, appearing as a backup at third base and in the outfield and occasionally coming out for pitching. Her most productive season came in 1953, when she posted a 7–1 record in 20 games and hit a solid .313 average. The Daisies reached the playoffs in the years in which she played for them, but were beaten in the last round.

After the league disbanded in 1954, Jean Weaver lived in Chicago, Illinois, for over forty years. In November 1988, the three sisters received recognition when the Baseball Hall of Fame and Museum in Cooperstown, New York dedicated a permanent display to the entire league rather than any individual player.

In 1995 Jean moved back to her hometown of Metropolis, Illinois, to be with her parents, former minor league ballplayer Lloyd Weaver and Elsie (Dummeier) Weaver. Joanne returned in 1990, while Betty came back in 1994. The three sisters were able to see each other every day. Betty died in 1998, following complications related to Amyotrophic lateral sclerosis (Lou Gehrig's disease), and Joanne died in 2000 of the same disease that claimed her sister. Eight years later, Jean died in her hometown at the age of 74.

== Statistics ==
Batting

GP	AB	R	H	2B	3B	HR	RBI	SB	BB	SO	BA	OBP	SLG
172	520	71	128	15	6	2	55	41	25	62	.246	.294	.310

Pitching

GP	W	L	W-L%	ERA	IP	H	R	ER	BB	SO	WHIP
25	7	3	.700	3.99	106	84	74	47	100	51	1.943

Fielding

PO	A	E	TC	DP	FA
187	251	43	481	15	.911
