= Georgia Campbell =

American baseball player (1926–2004)

Georgia Campbell (September 17, 1926 – May 5, 2004) was a pitcher who played in the All-American Girls Professional Baseball League (AAGPBL). Campbell batted and threw right handed. She was born in Syracuse, New York.

Campbell appears as a member of the Fort Wayne Daisies club during its 1946 season. She did not have individual records or some information was incomplete.

The AAGPBL folded in 1954, but there is a permanent display at the Baseball Hall of Fame and Museum at Cooperstown, New York, since November 5, 1988, that honors the entire league rather than any individual figure.
