= Donna Norris (baseball) =

American basketball player

Donna Norris (1934 Culver City, California–October 7, 2013) played in the All-American Girls Professional Baseball League.

== Baseball career ==
During her professional baseball career, Norris played in the positions of right field and utility infielder for two teams in 1953: the South Bend Blue Sox (playing 11 games) and the Fort Wayne Daisies (playing 5 games). She was described as a “sharp fielding infielder” and a “rookie flychaser.”

== Education ==
Norris earned a degree from Pepperdine University in Physical Education.

== Family life ==
When Norris died, she was survived by five daughters, 12 grandchildren and 13 great-grandchildren.

== Career statistics ==
Seasonal batting record

Year	G	AB	R	H	2B	3B	HR	RBI	SB	BB	SO	AVG
1953	16	36	3	3	1	0	0	2	0	1	13	.083
