= Betty Carveth =

Canadian baseball player (1925–2019)

- Pitcher
- Born: April 13, 1925; Edmonton, Alberta, Canada
- Died: January 27, 2019 (aged 93); Edmonton, Alberta, Canada
- Batted: Right Threw: Right

Teams
- Rockford Peaches (1945[start]); Fort Wayne Daisies (1945[end])

Career highlights and awards
- Postseason appearance (1945); Canadian Baseball Hall of Fame Honorary Induction (1998); Women in Baseball – AAGPBL Permanent Display at Baseball Hall of Fame and Museum (1988)

Marjorie Elizabeth Carveth (later Dunn, April 13, 1925 – January 27, 2019) was a Canadian pitcher who played in the All-American Girls Professional Baseball League (AAGPBL) during the 1945 season. She batted and threw right handed.

Born in Edmonton, Alberta, Betty Carveth was one of the 68 players born in Canada to join the All-American Girls Professional Baseball League in its twelve years history.

In her only season Carveth posted a combined 4–11 record and a 2.28 earned run average in 21 games for the Rockford Peaches (1945) and the Fort Wayne Daisies. During the best-of-five playoff series, she lost an 11-inning pitching duel with Racine Belles' Doris Barr.

In 1998, she garnered honorary induction in the Canadian Baseball Hall of Fame. She also is part of Women in Baseball, a permanent display based at the Baseball Hall of Fame and Museum in Cooperstown, New York, which was unveiled in 1988 to honor the entire All-American Girls Professional Baseball League.

Betty Carveth Dunn spent the latter part of her life in Edmonton and continued to be involved by awarding an annual $2000 scholarship which is named in her honour and shared with Millie Warwick McAuley, another Canadian who played in the AAGPBL. The scholarship is awarded in Alberta to a young female baseball player who combines excellence on the diamond, in the classroom and in the community. Betty and Millie also were Special Ambassadors during the first-ever World Cup of Women's Baseball held at Edmonton in 2004. In 2017, at the age of 91, Dunn was the oldest person at the time to be inducted into the Alberta Sports Hall of Fame. She died in Edmonton in 2019 at the age of 93.

== Career statistics ==
Pitching

GP	W	L	W-L%	ERA	IP	H	RA	ER	BB	SO	HBP	WP	WHIP
21	4	11	.267	2.28	138	116	57	35	47	28	0	3	1.18

Batting

GP	AB	R	H	2B	3B	HR	RBI	SB	BB	SO	BA	OBP
21	47	2	7	0	0	0	1	0	5	4	.149	.231

Fielding

GP	PO	A	E	TC	DP	FA
21	6	63	9	78	0	.885
