= Melba Alspaugh =

- Outfielder
- Born: July 13, 1926; Wichita, Kansas, US
- Died: February 16, 1983 (aged 56); Wichita, Kansas, US
- Batted: Right Threw: Right

Teams
- Fort Wayne Daisies (1948[start]); Rockford Peaches (1948[end]–1949[start]); Muskegon Lassies (1949[end])

Career highlights and awards
- Championship team (1948); Women in Baseball – AAGPBL Permanent Display at Baseball Hall of Fame and Museum (1988)

Melba Irene Alspaugh (July 13, 1926 – February 16, 1983) was an American backup outfielder who played from 1948 through 1949 in the All-American Girls Professional Baseball League (AAGPBL). She batted and threw right-handed.

Born in Wichita, Kansas, Alspaugh was a light hitting outfielder with good defense and a strong throwing arm. She entered the league in 1948 with the Fort Wayne Daisies, playing for them in part of the season before joining the Rockford Peaches at the end of the year, in time to become a member of the champion team.

In the 1948 playoffs, Rockford swept the Kenosha Comets in the first round of the best-of-five series, and also swept the Racine Belles in the second round of the best-of-five series. The Peaches then went on to win the Championship Title, beating the Daisies in the best-of-seven series, four to one games. Alspaugh hit .240 in eight playoff games (6-for-25), including a double and one stolen base, while driving in one run and scoring four times. She opened 1949 with Rockford, but was traded to the Muskegon Lassies during the midseason.

Alspaugh died in her hometown of Wichita, Kansas, at the age of 56.

== Career statistics ==
Batting

GP	AB	R	H	2B	3B	HR	RBI	SB	BB	SO	BA	OBP
112	297	41	59	1	0	0	19	40	29	46	.199	.270

Fielding

GP	PO	A	E	TC	DP	FA
99	104	10	5	119	2	.968
