= Evelyn Adams (baseball) =

- Shortstop
- Born: November 16, 1923; Richmond, Virginia, U.S.
- Died: August 14, 1999 (aged 75); Richmond, Virginia, U.S.
- Batted: Both Threw: Right

Teams
- Fort Wayne Daisies (1946); Grand Rapids Chicks (1946)

Career highlights and awards
- Richmond Softball Hall of Fame inductee (1974); Women in Baseball – AAGPBL Permanent Display at Baseball Hall of Fame and Museum (1988)

Evelyn E. "Tommie" Adams (November 16, 1923 – August 14, 1999) was a shortstop who played in the All-American Girls Professional Baseball League (AAGPBL) during the 1946 season. Listed at 5' 3", 110 lb., she was a switch-hitter and threw right-handed.

Adams spent one year in the league with two clubs but could not return the following season because of a lingering illness.

Born in Richmond, Virginia, Adams was nicknamed "Tommie" for her tomboy personality. She started playing baseball at age 14 with the Freckless, by then the only girls baseball team in Virginia. She was then a star pitcher for her club, who would play exclusively against men's teams. She later played organized softball for a few years.

Adams joined the AAGPBL in 1946 with the Fort Wayne Daisies and was traded to the Grand Rapids Chicks during the midseason. She played shortstop, hitting a .140 average in 39 games, but became sick and had to quit before the season ended. She was diagnosed with acute asthma and was unable to play the next year.

After recovering, Adams could not play amateur softball for a long time because of her professional status. She then coached and eventually played for the Dairy, Pollyannas and Polly's Pals softball teams in Virginia.

Besides this, Adams went to work for A&P Company in her hometown and retired in 1984 after 34 years of service.

Adams is part of Women in Baseball, a permanent display at the Baseball Hall of Fame and Museum at Cooperstown, New York unveiled in 1988, which is dedicated to the entire All-American Girls Professional Baseball League.

In 1974, she was named to the Richmond Softball Hall of Fame in recognition of her many accomplishments. She also was honored by the Colorado Silver Bullets all-female baseball team in their 1994 inaugural season, in which she threw out the first ball pitch of a game celebrated in Richmond.

Adams died in 1999 in her homeland of Richmond, Virginia at the age of 75.

== Career statistics ==
Batting

GP	AB	R	H	2B	3B	HR	RBI	SB	BB	SO	BA	OBP
39	86	6	12	1	1	0	1	4	6	20	.140	.197

Fielding

GP	PO	A	E	TC	DP	FA
18	12	22	8	42	1	.810
