= Kathryn Beare =

American softball player

- Catcher
- Born: November 7, 1917; Syracuse, New York, U.S.
- Died: January 27, 1997 (aged 79); Syracuse, New York, U.S.
- Batted: Right Threw: Right

Teams
- Fort Wayne Daisies (1946)

Career highlights and awards
- Women in Baseball – AAGPBL Permanent Display at Baseball Hall of Fame and Museum (1988)

Kathryn Beare (November 7, 1917 – January 27, 1997) was a catcher who played in the All-American Girls Professional Baseball League (AAGPBL). Listed at 5' 7", 170 lb., she batted and threw right handed.

Born in Syracuse, New York, the stocky Katie Beare played with the Fort Wayne Daisies in part of the 1946 season, batting a .111 average in 24 games while sharing catching duties with Kathryn Vonderau.

Following her brief stint in the league she returned to Syracuse, where she played softball for many years.

In 1988, Beare received further recognition when she became part of Women in Baseball, a permanent display based at the Baseball Hall of Fame and Museum in Cooperstown, New York, which was unveiled to honor the entire All-American Girls Professional Baseball League.

== Career statistics ==
Batting

GP	AB	R	H	2B	3B	HR	RBI	SB	TB	BB	SO	BA	OBP	SLG
24	45	1	5	0	0	0	1	0	5	6	3	.111	.220	.111

Fielding

GP	PO	A	E	TC	DP	FA
24	61	10	4	75	2	.947
