= Donna Cook =

- Pitcher / Outfield
- Born: May 24, 1928; Muskegon, Michigan, U.S.
- Died: October 16, 2006 (aged 78); North Muskegon, Michigan, U.S.
- Batted: Right Threw: Left

Teams
- Muskegon Lassies (1946–1948); Chicago Colleens (1948); Fort Wayne Daisies (1948–1949); Grand Rapids Chicks (1950); Battle Creek Belles (1951–1952); Muskegon Belles (1953); South Bend Blue Sox (1953); Rockford Peaches (1954)

Career highlights and awards
- Three playoffs appearances (1947–1949); Muskegon Sports Area Hall of Fame (1993); Women in Baseball – AAGPBL Permanent Display at Baseball Hall of Fame and Museum (1988)

Donna Jean Cook [״Cookie״] (May 24, 1928 – October 16, 2006) was a pitcher and outfielder who played from 1946 through 1954 in the All-American Girls Professional Baseball League (AAGPBL). Listed at 5 ft 2 in (1.57 m), 121 lb., she batted right-handed and threw left-handed.

Donna Cook played for eight different teams of the All-American Girls Professional Baseball League in nine years. She moved around for a while, as the league usually shifted players as needed to help some teams stay afloat.

Born in Muskegon, Michigan, Donna was one of twelve children into the family of Sidney and Daisy (née Johnson) Cook. She played five years of organized softball before joining the league with her hometown team, just days after graduating from Muskegon Heights High School.

In 1946 Cook opened at right field for the Muskegon Lassies. She had a .156 average in 78 games. The next year she was switched to pitcher. She became a proven starter, turning in a 14–8 record with a sparkling 1.42 earned run average, as the Lassies posted a 69‑43 record en route to win the regular season championship in a close pennant race. Muskegon, managed by Bill Wambsganss, nailed down the victory with two days remaining on the schedule, though the team was eliminated in the playoffs by a strong Racine Belles squad. During a stretch in the season, Cook won four games in a week and belted two home runs in a game. In addition, she ended fourth in the league for the best winning percentage (.636) and tenth in ERA.

Cook started 1948 with Muskegon, but was traded to the Chicago Colleens in the midseason and ended the year with the Fort Wayne Daisies, which took a toll on her performance, dropping to a 4–9 record with a 4.03 ERA. She made a successful comeback for the Daisies in 1949, evening her record at 9–9 with a 1.94 ERA in 22 pitching appearances. Unfortunately, she injured a knee toward the end of the season, which affected her for the rest of her career.

She slumped considerably for the next five years, pitching in only 32 games with the Grand Rapids Chicks (1950), Battle Creek/Muskegon Belles (1951–1953), South Bend Blue Sox (1953) and Rockford Peaches (1954). Her younger sister, Doris Cook, also played in the league. The sisters came together in South Bend.

After baseball Cook worked as a bank teller at Comerica Bank in Muskegon during 25 years. She also had three surgeries on her injured knee.

Since 1988 she is part of Women in Baseball, a permanent display based at the Baseball Hall of Fame and Museum in Cooperstown, New York, which was unveiled to honor the entire All-American Girls Professional Baseball League. She also was inducted into the Muskegon Area Sports Hall of Fame along with her sister Doris in 1993.

Donna Cook died in 2006 in North Muskegon, Michigan, at the age of 79.

== Career statistics ==
Pitching

GP	W	L	W-L%	ERA	IP	H	RA	ER	BB	SO	HB	WP	WHIP	SO/BB
108	28	39	.418	3.38	596	451	315	224	449	246	29	17	1.72	0.59

Batting

GP	AB	R	H	2B	3B	HR	RBI	SB	TB	BB	SO	BA	OBP	SLG
439	1294	99	246	20	7	2	76	46	286	95	85	.190	.246	.221

Fielding

GP	PO	A	E	TC	DP	FA
466	599	160	45	TC	45	.954
