= Nalda Bird =

- Pitcher
- Born: February 11, 1927; Los Angeles, California, US
- Died: September 15, 2004 (aged 77)
- Batted: Right Threw: Left

Teams
- South Bend Blue Sox (1945)

Career highlights and awards
- Hurled complete game shutouts in both games of a doubleheader; Women in Baseball – AAGPBL Permanent Display at Baseball Hall of Fame and Museum (since 1988)

Nalda Marie Bird [Phillips] (February 11, 1927 – September 15, 2004) was a starting pitcher and outfielder who played in the All-American Girls Professional Baseball League (AAGPBL) during the 1945 season. Listed at 5 ft 1 in (1.55 m), 115 lb., Bird batted right-handed and threw left-handed. She was nicknamed "Birdie". Sometimes she is credited as Nelda Bird.

== Early life ==
A native of Los Angeles, California, Nalda Bird was the daughter of James Henry Bird, Sr. and Donalda Quesnel Bird. She grew up with three brothers who taught her how to play baseball. At age 10 she began playing organized softball, and a year later she joined a semi-professional team. She later became a top all-around athlete while in high school. At 17, she was invited to the 1945 spring training of the All-American Girls Professional Baseball League at Wrigley Field in Chicago. Before that, a player from Los Angeles Angels PCL team worked with her on playing baseball. Finally, she was signed to a contract and was allocated to the South Bend Blue Sox.

== Professional career ==
Bird was a hard-throwing and durable left-hander, but had problems with her control in her only season in the league. She joined a South Bend pitching staff headed by Charlotte Armstrong, and contributed with 13 victories, even though she allowed the most earned runs (67), tied the league season-record for the more balks (six), and posted a 0.80 strikeout-to-walk ratio (128-to-160).

After the season ended, soon to be nineteen, Nalda left the game, got married with Jesse Otis Phillips, and delivered her only son, Michael. In 1947 she pitched in the National Women's Softball League of Chicago, because the AAGPBL no longer used underhand pitchers. She hurled a no-hitter in her only season in Chicago, and retired to take care of her husband and little boy. She was widowed in 1991.

Nalda Bird-Phillips died in Kennesaw, Georgia, at the age of 77.

== Pitching statistics ==
GP	W	L	W-L%	ERA	IP	H	R	ER	BB	SO	WHIP
31	13	17	.433	2.70	223	135	117	67	160	128	1.322

== Fact ==
The AAGPBL Players Association movement helped to bring the league story to the public eye. The association was largely responsible for the opening of a permanent display at the Baseball Hall of Fame and Museum in Cooperstown, New York since November 5, 1988 that honors those who were part of this unique experience. Nalda Bird-Phillips coauthored the Official Song of the All-American Girls Professional Baseball League along with Pepper Paire. The theme, named Victory Song, was popularized in the 1992 film A League of Their Own, directed by Penny Marshall, which was a fictionalized account dedicated to the women who played in the league during the course of World War II. In their annual reunions since 1998, it is usual to hear the original AAGPBL players singing We're the members of the All-American League. We come from cities near and far. We've got Canadians, Irish ones, and Swedes. We're all for one, we're one for all. We're all Americans.
