= Shirley Weierman =

Shirley Ann Weierman (June 27, 1938 – July 11, 1999) played in the All-American Girls Professional Baseball League between 1953 and 1954. She both batted and threw right-handed. Outside of her interest in baseball, Shirley enjoyed fishing, golf, painting and tennis.

== Early life ==
Shirley was born in Lima, Ohio to parents Edwin Earl Weierman and Amy Grace Weierman, née Frankhouser.

== Baseball career ==
Shirley began playing baseball for the AAGPBL at a very young age. In fact, at 14, when she joined the Fort Wayne Daisies she was the youngest player to join the league. She played in the position of utility infielder in third base. She earned a reputation as being a "good fielder and a better than average hitter." She enjoyed playing, being "disappointed" she didn't get a longer time playing with the league, but was happy she managed to play some. She retired in 1954 on the dissolution of the league.

== After baseball ==
Following her short-lived but successful baseball career, in 1954, Shirley retired and embarked on a career in dentistry. She was licensed by the Dental Board of California, license #21076, expiration date, June 30, 1998.

== Batting record ==
Year	G	AB	R	H	2B	3B	HR	RBI	SB	BB	SO	AVG
1953	-10	-	-	-	-	-	-	-	-	-		-
1954	11	28	0	5	0	0	0	0	0	1	12	.179

== Sources ==
1. Ancestry.com 2. Prolicenses
