= Phyllis Bookout =

American baseball player

- Utility infielder
- Born: August 1, 1935; Fort Wayne, Indiana, U.S.
- Died: October 31, 1964 (aged 29); Fort Wayne, Indiana, U.S.
- Batted: Right Threw: Right

Teams
- Fort Wayne Daisies (1953)

Career highlights and awards
- Women in Baseball – AAGPBL Permanent Display at the Baseball Hall of Fame and Museum (since 1988)

Phyllis Bookout Jontz (August 1, 1935 – October 31, 1964) was a utility infielder who played in the All-American Girls Professional Baseball League (AAGPBL). She batted and threw right handed.

Phyllis Bookout was assigned to the Fort Wayne Daisies club in its 1953 season. She did not have individual records or some information was incomplete at the time of the request. The AAGPBL folded in 1954, but there is a permanent display at the Baseball Hall of Fame and Museum at Cooperstown, New York, since November 5, 1988, that honors the entire league rather than any individual figure.
