= Lottie Beck =

American baseball player

- Catcher
- Born: January 9, 1929; Jackson, Missouri, U.S.
- Died: February 17, 2010 (aged 81); Jackson, Missouri, U.S.
- Batted: Right Threw: Right

Teams
- Fort Wayne Daisies (1946)

Career highlights and awards
- Women in Baseball – AAGPBL Permanent Display at Baseball Hall of Fame and Museum (since 1988)

Lottie Beck (January 9, 1929 – February 17, 2010) was an All-American Girls Professional Baseball League catcher. She batted and threw right handed.

Beck was assigned to the Fort Wayne Daisies club in its 1946 season. She did not have individual records or some information was incomplete at the time of the request.

The All-American Girls Professional Baseball League folded in 1954, but there is now a permanent display at the Baseball Hall of Fame and Museum at Cooperstown, New York, since November 5, 1988, that honors those who were part of this unique experience. Lottie, along with the rest of the girls and the league staff, is included at the display/exhibit.
