= Carol K. Brown =

American sculptor and visual artist

- Born: Tennessee, US
- Known for: Sculpture
- Notable work: Pedestrian series (2006), and Home Décor series (2008)
- Awards: National Endowment for the Arts Fellowship (1984 and 1986)

Carol K. Brown (born 1945 in Tennessee) is an American artist that works with sculpture, painting, photography, installation, video, and digital manipulation. She is a professor of sculpture at the New World School of the Arts in Miami. Brown lives and works between Miami and New York.

== Work ==
Carol K. Brown received an MFA from University of Colorado, Boulder, in 1981, and a BFA from University of Miami, Coral Gables, Florida, in 1978. Brown also had academic experiences at Tulane University, New Orleans, LA (1965) and at New School for Social Research, New York (1967).

Brown's artistic practice has elaborated on social commentary about female perception and gender perspectives in relationship to the environment and society. Her initial sculptural work evolved into an expansive multidisciplinary practice, from anthropomorphic figures to abstraction and figurative painting.

Her solo exhibition Off (spring) in 2014-2015 at Under the Bridge Art Space, South Florida, showcased paintings, photographs, installation, and video pieces to touch on the overwhelming and distinct experiences of motherhood and childbearing.

In 2019, Carol K. Brown's solo exhibition Down The Rabbit Whole, in New York, displayed a series of mixed media paintings on board and three sculptures.

Her work is often associated with her metal elongated sculpture work, but her most recent body of work encompasses a series of watercolor paintings and hand drawings, which she titles "Modified Husband." The series, a culmination of decades worth of artistic practice, was on view at Brown's 2023 solo exhibition Someplace Else at Nohra Haime Gallery, in New York. The series also takes inspiration from Henry David Thoreau's writings.

== Collections (selection) ==
Her artworks are featured in international museum collections across the United States including Pérez Art Museum Miami, the Museum of Contemporary Art San Diego, the Memphis Brooks Museum of Art, and the Herbert F. Johnson Museum of Art at Cornell University, the Denver Art Museum, Colorado; University of Colorado, Boulder; City of Orlando, Art in Public Spaces in Miami-Dade County Art in Public Spaces, and Miami-Dade County Public Library.

== Awards and recognition ==
Carol K. Brown is the recipient of regional and national awards. She has received the State of Florida Fine Arts Fellowship (1983), the National Endowment for the Arts Fellowship (1984 and 1986), and the Southeastern Center for Contemporary Art Fellowship (1986).
