= Dick Bass (baseball) =

American baseball player (1906–1989)

- Pitcher
- Born: July 7, 1906; Rogersville, Tennessee, U.S.
- Died: February 3, 1989 (aged 82); Graceville, Florida, U.S.
- Batted: Right Threw: Right

MLB debut
- September 21, 1939, for the Washington Senators

Last MLB appearance
- September 21, 1939, for the Washington Senators

MLB statistics
- Win–loss record: 0–1
- Earned run average: 6.75
- Strikeouts: 1
- Stats at Baseball Reference

Teams
- Washington Senators (1939)

Richard William Bass (July 7, 1906 – February 3, 1989) was an American Major League Baseball pitcher.

Bass grew up in rural Tennessee, in the small town of Rogersville. A tall, right-handed pitcher, Bass attended Miami University in Ohio, where he was named to the All-Buckeye baseball teams during his junior and senior years. He signed with the St. Louis Cardinals organization, and made his pro debut with Shawnee, Oklahoma in 1930; he wound up in Louisville by 1932 and pitched parts of six seasons with the Louisville Colonels of the American Association, winning 17 games in 1934. After winning 19 games with the Chattanooga Lookouts of the Southern Association in 1939, Bass got the call to the majors, starting for the Washington Senators on September 21, 1939.

Bass and the Cleveland Indians' Al Milnar battled through six scoreless innings, before Washington's Charlie Gelbert hit a two-run homer in the bottom of the seventh, giving the Nats a 2–0 lead. But Bass fell apart in the eighth, giving up singles to Roy Weatherly, Ben Chapman and Odell Hall. After hitting Bruce Campbell with a pitch to load the bases, Ken Keltner doubled to give Cleveland a lead they would never relinquish; Cleveland would win, 6–3, ruining Bass' major league debut. Most of Bass' start (from the fourth inning onwards) can still be heard today, as part of the WJSV broadcast day tapes, making it one of the oldest baseball play-by-play broadcasts still extant.

It would be Bass' only game in the majors. Already 33 years old, he would return to Chattanooga, then enlist in World War II. (Instead of heading overseas, however, Bass remained in Ohio, employed as a purchasing agent by an aluminum company in Dayton. He also managed the local amateur baseball team to four city championships and the World's Amateur Championship at Youngstown, Ohio in 1944.) After the war, he pitched for and managed Class D clubs in Gainesville, Florida and Kingsport, Tennessee, not far from his old hometown. In 1948, when Bass was fired by Kingsport, he took another managerial job, coaching not men but women: the Fort Wayne Daisies of the All-American Girls Professional Baseball League.

Bass died in 1989, in Graceville, Florida.
