= Patricia Burton =

American basketball player

- Born: November 16, 1932; Steele, Missouri, U.S.
- Died: March 26, 2018 (aged 85); Memphis, Tennessee, U.S.
- Batted: Right Threw: Right

debut
- 1950

Last appearance
- 1950

Teams
- Fort Wayne Daisies (1950)

Patricia Burton [married surname Woody] (November 16, 1932 – March 26, 2018) was an All-American Girls Professional Baseball League player. Burton batted and threw right handed. She was born in Steele, Missouri. She died in March 2018 at the age of 85. She later played basketball for Holmes Community College and was recruited by the All-American Red Heads.

== Notes ==
- Little is known about this player. Burton appears as a member of the Fort Wayne Daisies club during its 1950 season. Nevertheless, the league stopped individual achievements after 1948, so individual accomplishments are complete only through 1949.
- She is part of the AAGPBL permanent display at the Baseball Hall of Fame and Museum at Cooperstown, New York opened in 1988, which is dedicated to the entire league rather than any individual figure.
