= Jean Campbell (baseball) =

American baseball player (1928–2004)

Jean Campbell (December 30, 1928 – August 18, 2004) was a catcher who played in the All-American Girls Professional Baseball League (AAGPBL). Campbell batted and threw right handed. She was born in Syracuse, New York.

== Notes ==
- Little is known about this player. Campbell appears as a member of the Fort Wayne Daisies club during its 1946 season. Campbell did not have individual records or some information was incomplete.
- Campbell is part of the AAGPBL permanent display at the Baseball Hall of Fame and Museum at Cooperstown, New York opened in 1988, which is dedicated to the entire league rather than any individual figure.
