= Lenna Arnold =

American baseball player

Lenna B. Arnold
- Pitcher
- Born: October 29, 1920; Fort Wayne, Indiana, US
- Died: January 22, 2010 (aged 89); Fort Wayne, Indiana, US
- Batted: Right Threw: Right
- Stats at Baseball Reference

Teams
- Fort Wayne Daisies (1946)

Career highlights and awards
- Women in Baseball – AAGPBL Permanent Display at Baseball Hall of Fame and Museum (1988)

Lenna B. Arnold (October 29, 1920 – January 22, 2010) was a pitcher who played in the All-American Girls Professional Baseball League (AAGPBL). Listed at 5' 7", 135 lb., she batted and threw right handed.

Arnold was an outstanding softball pitcher before joining the AAGPBL with her hometown Fort Wayne Daisies in the 1946 season.

Born in Fort Wayne, Indiana, Arnold was the only daughter of two children born to John E. Sr. and Marie (Klemm) Arnold. She was a 1939 graduate of Central High School, subsequently receiving a bachelor's degree from Ball State Teachers College and a master's degree from Indiana University. An all-around athlete, she excelled at softball with the Uhligs Machine Shop and also played basketball for the City Light squad, while participating in golf, skiing and bowling.

״Sis״, as her Daisies teammates called her, had a modest career during her only season in the league, ending with a 2–4 record in just six pitching appearances. As a hitter, she went 3-for-14 for a .214 batting average.

After that, she labored as a teacher during 35 years for Fort Wayne Community Schools, teaching at Central and Northrop high schools, before retiring in 1978.

Following her retirement, she followed the Indiana Hoosiers on the basketball court and enjoyed travelling throughout the United States in a motorhome.

In 1988, Arnold received further recognition when she became part of Women in Baseball, a permanent display based at the Baseball Hall of Fame and Museum in Cooperstown, New York, which was unveiled to honor the entire All-American Girls Professional Baseball League.

She died in 2010 at her home of Fort Wayne at the age of 89.

== Pitching statistics ==
GP	W	L	W-L%	ERA	IP	H	RA	ER	BB	SO	HBP	WP	WHIP
6	2	4	.333	n/a	40	37	32	n/a	23	1	1	2	1.50
