= Virginia Carver =

American baseball player (1935–2022)

Virginia Carver (February 23, 1935 – December 9, 2022) was a pitcher and outfielder who played in the All-American Girls Professional Baseball League (AAGPBL). She was born in New Brighton, Pennsylvania.

Carver entered the league in 1953 with the South Bend Blue Sox, and later was a member of the pennant-winning Fort Wayne Daisies in its 1954 season.

In 17 pitching appearances, Carver posted a 5–7 record with an 8.78 ERA in 80.0 innings of work. As a batter, she hit an average of .173 (13-for-75) in 32 games, including seven RBI, seven runs scored, and one stolen base.

The AAGPBL folded in 1954, but there is a permanent display at the Baseball Hall of Fame and Museum at Cooperstown, New York, since November 5, 1988, that honors the entire league rather than any individual figure.

Carver died in Petaluma, California on December 9, 2022, aged 87.
