= Rita Briggs =

American baseball player (1929–1994)

- Catcher / Outfielder
- Born: March 27, 1929; Ayer, Massachusetts, U.S.
- Died: September 6, 1994 (aged 65); Kalamazoo, Michigan, U.S.
- Batted: Left Threw: Right

debut
- 1947

Last appearance
- 1954

Teams
- Rockford Peaches (1947–'48); Chicago Colleens (1948); South Bend Blue Sox (1949); Racine Belles (1949); Peoria Redwings (1949–'51); Battle Creek Belles (1952); Fort Wayne Daisies (1953–'54)

Career highlights and awards
- All-Star Team (1952); Two playoff appearances (1953-'54); All-time, single-season record for most games played by a catcher (1948); Women in Baseball – AAGPBL Permanent Display Baseball Hall of Fame and Museum (1988)

Rita Briggs ["Maude"] (March 27, 1929 – September 6, 1994) was an American female baseball catcher who played from 1947 through 1954 for seven different teams in the All-American Girls Professional Baseball League (AAGPBL). Listed at 5 ft 3 in (1.60 m), 120 lb., Briggs batted left-handed and threw right-handed. She was born in Ayer, Massachusetts.

== Brief profile ==
An All-Star and member of two champion teams, Briggs was a backup catcher during the last years of the All-American Girls Professional Baseball League. Known more for her glove work than her bat, she had a strong throwing arm and has synergy with pitchers. This benefited her play as the league expanded the length of the base paths and pitching distance and decreased the size of the ball until the final year of play. She recorded an all-time mark for most games played by a catcher in a single season. Besides this, she was able to play all outfield positions and first base while being a left-hitter.

== Early life ==
Briggs started to play baseball at a very early age. She attended Ayer High School, where she was the full-time catcher for the Ayer baseball team to become the first and only girl ballplayer in the school's history. Briggs was discovered by an AAGPBL scout while she was playing at school and gave her a tryout. Briggs did well, and was given a contract to play in the 1947 season. This time the league opened its spring training in Havana, Cuba.

== AAGPBL career ==
Briggs entered the league in 1947 with the Rockford Peaches, playing for them one and a half years before joining the Chicago Colleens (1948), South Bend Blue Sox (1949), Racine Belles (1949), Peoria Redwings (1949-'51), Battle Creek Belles (1952) and Fort Wayne Daisies (1953-'54). She hit .215 in limited action during her rookie season. In 1948 she batted .200 for Rockford and Chicago with a career-high 43 stolen bases and seven triples (third in the league). She caught 128 games that year, to set an all-time record for most games played by a catcher in a single season.

Playing for three clubs in 1949, Briggs hit a combined .222 average with 22 steals before becoming a regular with Peoria for the next two years. Her most productive season came in 1951, when she posted career-highs in average (.275), runs scored (57) and runs batted in (44). After that she helped the Daisies to win pennants in 1953 and 1954, but the team lost the final series in both years to the Grand Rapids Chicks and Kalamazoo Lassies, respectively. She was named to the All-Star Team in 1952, and shared catching duties with Pepper Paire in 1954, during what turned out to be the All-American League's final season.

In November 1988, the AAGPBL received recognition when the Baseball Hall of Fame and Museum in Cooperstown, New York dedicated a permanent display to the entire league.

Rita Briggs spent the last years of her life in Kalamazoo, Michigan, where she died at the age of 65. In 2009, Ayer High School dedicated their new softball park Rita Briggs Field, to her.

== Statistics ==
=== Batting ===
| GP | AB | R | H | 2B | 3B | HR | RBI | TB | SB | BB | SO | BA | OBP | SLG |
|---|---|---|---|---|---|---|---|---|---|---|---|---|---|---|
| 757 | 2465 | 274 | 507 | 42 | 10 | 6 | 227 | 587 | 186 | 318 | 145 | .206 | .296 | .238 |

=== Fielding ===
| GP | PO | A | E | TC | DP | FA |
|---|---|---|---|---|---|---|
| 729 | 2112 | 496 | 108 | 2716 | 57 | .960 |
