= Velma Abbott =

Canadian baseball player (1924–1987)

- Second base / Third base
- Born: May 29, 1924; Regina, Saskatchewan, Canada
- Died: October 5, 1987 (aged 63); Fair Oaks, California, US
- Batted: Right Threw: Right
- Stats at Baseball Reference

Teams
- Kenosha Comets (1946); Peoria Redwings (1946); Rockford Peaches (1946); Fort Wayne Daisies (1947)

Career highlights and awards
- Canadian Baseball Hall of Fame and Museum; Women in Baseball – AAGPBL Permanent Display at Baseball Hall of Fame and Museum (1988)

Flora Velma Abbott (May 29, 1924 – October 5, 1987) was a utility infielder who played in the All-American Girls Professional Baseball League (AAGPBL). Listed at 5 ft 2 in (1.57 m), 110 pounds (50 kg), she batted and threw right handed.

== Biography ==
A native of Regina, Saskatchewan Abbott was one of the sixty eight girls from Canada who played in the All-American Girls Professional Baseball League during its 12-year history. A light-hitting reserve player, she was able to play at second base and third and showed speed on the bases, while playing for four different teams in a span of two years.

Before joining the league, Abbott played in California with the Alameda Girls, a twice World Champion in amateur softball. She entered the AAGPBL in 1946, dividing her playing time between the Kenosha Comets, Peoria Redwings and Rockford Peaches. She posted a collective .178 batting average in 52 games, driving in five runs while scoring 15 times.

Abbott opened the 1947 season with the Fort Wayne Daisies, playing for them as a regular at third base. She hit .141 with 27 runs and 15 RBI, including 18 stolen bases and her only career home run.

== Career statistics ==
Batting

GP	AB	R	H	2B	3B	HR	RBI	SB	BB	SO	BA	OBP	SLG
149	438	42	68	2	4	1	20	33	38	43	.155	.227	.185

Fielding

GP	PO	A	E	TC	DP	FA
133	187	239	51	477	16	.893

== Facts ==
The All-American Girls Professional Baseball League folded in 1954. It was a neglected chapter of sports history, at least until 1988, when was inaugurated a permanent display at the Baseball Hall of Fame and Museum at Cooperstown, New York, which is dedicated to the entire league rather than any individual figure.

After that, filmmaker Penny Marshall premiered her 1992 film A League of Their Own, a fictional history centered in the first season of the AAGPBL. Starring Geena Davis, Tom Hanks, Madonna, Lori Petty and Rosie O'Donnell, this film brought a rejuvenated interest to the extinct league.

Abbott and the other girls that represented Canada in the AAGPBL form part of the aforementioned display at Cooperstown. They also gained induction into the Canadian Baseball Hall of Fame in 1998.
