= Fort Wayne Daisies =

- 1945–1954; Fort Wayne, Indiana
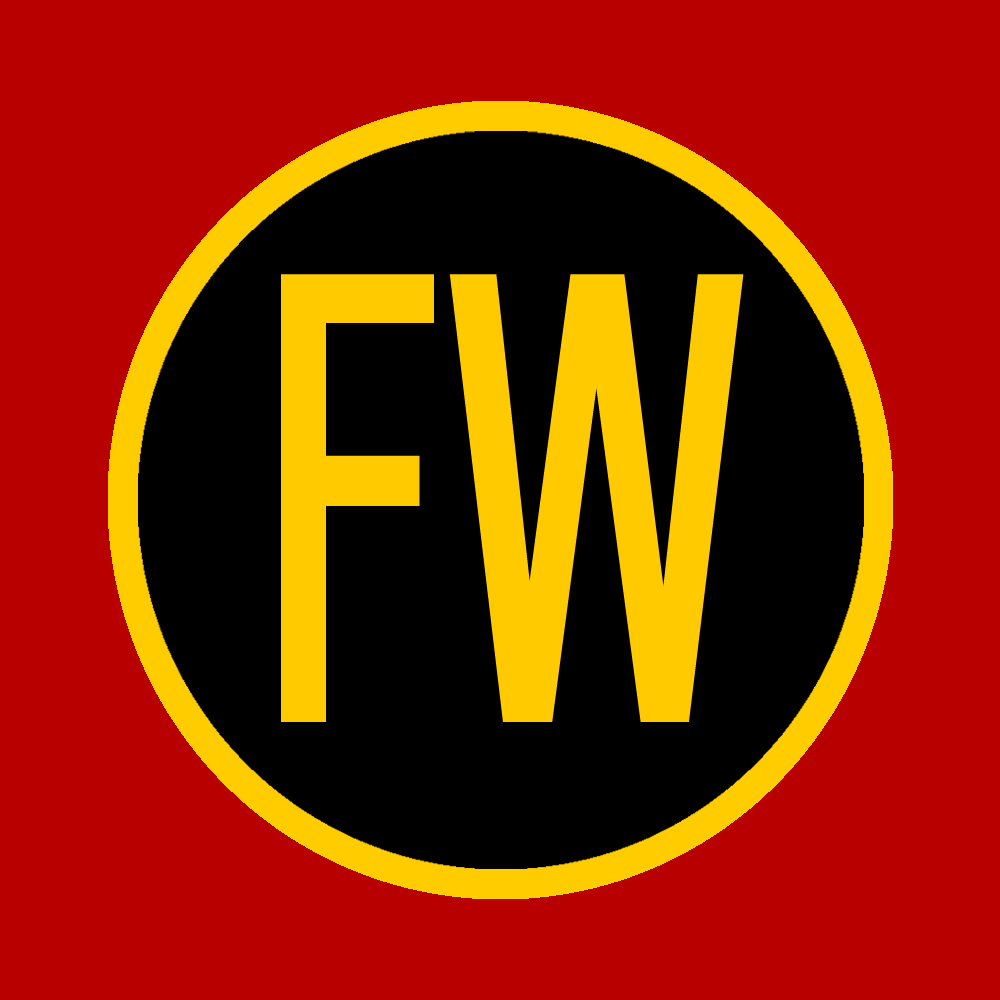

Minor league affiliations
- Previous leagues: All-American Girls Professional Baseball League

Team data
- Previous parks: North Side High School (1945–1946); Memorial Park (1946–1954)
- Owner/ Operator: AAGPBL

1953 Fort Wayne Daisies Front, L-R: Jean Geissinger (CF), Rita Briggs (C/OF), Jean Havlish (SS), Alice Blaski (utility), Delores Brumfield (IF), Lavonne Paire (C), Shirley Crites (3B), Wilma Briggs (LF), Dolly Vanderlip (P). Back, L-R: Bill Allington (manager), Maxine Kline (P), Katie Horstman (UT), Jean Weaver (P/3B), Jaynne Bittner (P), Joanne Weaver (RF), Betty Weaver Foss (1B), Mary Taylor (OF), Pat Scott (P), Doris Tetzlaff (chaperone).

The Fort Wayne Daisies were a women's professional baseball team based in Fort Wayne, Indiana, that played from 1945 through 1954 as members of the All-American Girls Professional Baseball League (AAGPBL).

== History ==
The Daisies represented Fort Wayne, Indiana, and their home games were played at North Side High School (1945–1946) and Memorial Park (1946–1954).

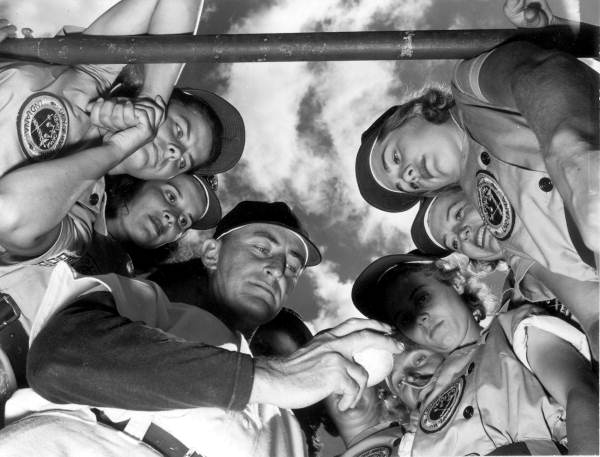
Dick Bass with members of the Fort Wayne Daisies baseball team- Opa-locka, Florida on April 22, 1948

Daisy uniforms often changed from one season to the next, away uniforms having been yellow, pink, and brown during various years. Early Daisy uniforms featured a circular emblem of the Fort Wayne city seal in the center of the chest. This was replaced in later years with a patch reading "DAISIES". In the final years of the league, the Daisy uniform changed to a center seam running down the middle of the dress with an F and W on the front.

The team debuted in the 1945 season, replacing the departed Minneapolis Millerettes. The Daisies went 62–47 in their debut and finished four and a half games behind the first place Rockford Peaches.

Even though the Daisies made it to the playoffs in every year from 1948 to 1954, ending in first place from 1951 through 1954, they failed to win a championship title.

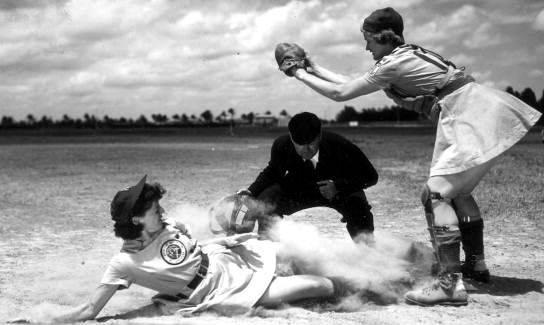
Marg Callaghan of the Fort Wayne Daisies sliding into home plate as umpire Norris Ward watches in Opa-locka, Florida on April 22, 1948

Among its notable players were the sisters Betty Foss and Joanne Weaver, who were able to win the final five batting championships of the league and two Player of the Year awards. With Helen Callaghan leading all hitters in 1945, the Daisies amassed six batting crowns to set a league record.

Other players of note included pitchers Jaynne Bittner, Maxine Kline and Dorothy Wiltse Collins; catchers Rita Briggs and Lavonne Paire; shortstop Dorothy Schroeder, center fielder Faye Dancer, and sluggers Wilma Briggs and Jean Geissinger.

== All-time players roster ==
Bold denotes members of the inaugural roster

- Velma Abbott
- Evelyn Adams
- Melba Alspaugh
- Isabel Alvarez
- Lavone Anson
- Lenna Arnold
- Phyllis Baker
- Lois Barker
- Kathryn Beare
- Lottie Beck
- Jaynne Bittner
- Alice Blaski
- Kay Blumetta
- Phyllis Bookout
- Rita Briggs
- Wilma Briggs
- Carol Brown
- Delores Brumfield
- Shirley Burkovich
- Patricia Burton
- **Helen Callaghan**
- **Margaret Callaghan**
- Georgia Campbell
- Jean Campbell
- Virginia Carver
- **Betty Carveth**
- Donna Cook
- Dorothy Cook
- Shirley Crites
- Sarah Mavis Dabbs
- **Faye Dancer**
- Alice DeCambra
- Lillian DeCambra
- Mildred Deegan
- Audrey Deemer
- Thelma Eisen
- Lillian Faralla
- Meryle Fitzgerald
- Betty Foss
- Barbara Gates
- Jean Geissinger
- Beulah Anne Georges
- Betty Gernert
- **Audrey Haine**
- Elise Harney
- Jean Havlish
- Ruby Heafner
- Joyce Hill
- Nancy Hodgin
- Alice Hoover
- Catherine Horstman
- **Lillian Jackson**
- Alice Janowski
- Frances Janssen
- **Arleene Johnson**
- Marilyn Jones
- Daisy Junor
- **Vivian Kellogg**
- Beatrice Kemmerer
- Helen Ketola
- Maxine Kline
- Theresa Kobuszewski
- Phyllis Koehn
- Irene Kotowicz
- **Dorothy Kovalchick**
- Ruth Kramer
- Marie Kruckel
- Noella Leduc
- **Annabelle Lee**
- Rhoda Leonard
- **Ruth Lessing**
- Alta Little
- Betty Luna
- Helene Machado
- Betty McKenna
- Marie Mahoney
- Kathleen Malach
- Mirtha Marrero
- **Doris Marsh**
- Ruth Matlack
- Mildred Meacham
- Naomi Meier
- Norma Metrolis
- Eleanor Moore
- Mary Moraty
- Nancy Mudge
- Mary Nelson
- Donna Norris
- **Penny O'Brian**
- **Lavonne Paire**
- June Peppas
- Betty Petryna
- Marjorie Pieper
- Bertha Podolski
- Marie Richardson
- Georgiana Rios
- Mary Rountree
- Patricia Roy
- **Irene Ruhnke**
- Toni Sachetti
- Ellen Schallern
- Dorothy Schroeder
- Pat Scott
- Jean Smith
- Adele Stahley
- Lee Surkowski
- Mary Taylor
- Norma Taylor
- **Yolande Teillet**
- Doris Tetzlaff
- Helen Thomas
- Mava Lee Thomas
- Alice Tognatti
- **Betty Trezza**
- Betty Tucker
- Dolly Vanderlip
- Kathryn Vonderau
- Helen Walulik
- Nancy Warren
- Evelyn Wawryshyn
- Jean Weaver
- Joanne Weaver
- Mary Weddle
- Marie Wegman
- Shirley Weierman
- Margaret Wenzell
- Betty Whiting
- Ruth Williams
- **Dorothy Wiltse**
- Elsie Wingrove
- Trois Wood
- Lois Youngen
- **Agnes Zurowski**

== Managers ==
* Bill Wambsganss	1945; 1946
* George Johnson	1947 [first half]
* William Rohrer	1947 [second half]
* Dick Bass	1948
* Harold Greiner * Vivian Kellogg	1949 [first half] 1949 [second half]
* Mary Rountree	1950 [first half]
* Max Carey	1950 [second half] 1951
* Jimmie Foxx	1952
* Bill Allington	1953; 1954

== See also ==
- History of sports in Fort Wayne, Indiana

== Sources ==
- All-American Girls Professional Baseball League History
- All-American Girls Professional Baseball League official website – Fort Wayne Daisies seasons
- All-American Girls Professional Baseball League official website – Manager/Player profile search results
- AAGPBL Collectors
- AAGPBL Everything
- The Diamond Angle – AAGPBL Players Interviews
- Golden Age Era Sports
- All-American Girls Professional Baseball League Record Book – W. C. Madden. Publisher: McFarland & Company, 2000. Format: Hardcover, 294pp. Language: English. ISBN 0-7864-0597-X
- The Women of the All-American Girls Professional Baseball League: A Biographical Dictionary – W. C. Madden. Publisher: McFarland & Company, 2005. Format: Softcover, 295 pp. Language: English. ISBN 978-0-7864-2263-0
