= Joanne Weaver =

American baseball player (1935–2000)

- Right field
- Born: December 19, 1935; Metropolis, Illinois, U.S.
- Died: March 19, 2000 (aged 64); Metropolis, Illinois, U.S.
- Batted: Right Threw: Right

Career statistics
- Batting average: .359
- Hits: 438
- Home runs: 38
- Runs batted in: 234
- Stolen bases: 174

Teams
- Fort Wayne Daisies (1950–1954)

Career highlights and awards
- Player of the Year Award (1954); 3× AAGPBL All-Star Team (1952–1954); 3× AAGPBL batting champion (1952–1954); AAGPBL home run leader (1954); AAGPBL records: All-time leader in batting average: .359; Single-season record in batting average: .429; Single-season record for home runs: 29 (1954); Single-season record for total bases: 187

Joanne "Joltin' Jo" Weaver (December 19, 1935 – March 19, 2000) was a right fielder who played from 1951 through 1954 in the All-American Girls Professional Baseball League (AAGPBL). Listed at 5 ft 11 in (1.80 m), 142 lb., she batted and threw right-handed.

== Overview profile ==
One of the most talented hitters in AAGPBL history, Joanne Weaver was the youngest of three sisters to play for the Fort Wayne Daisies in the final years of the league. Weaver often outdid her renowned sister, Betty, as a power hitter, winning three consecutive batting titles and setting several all-time records. At this point, the Weaver-Foss duet led the AAGPBL in most major offensive categories between 1952 and 1954. A three-time All-Star, Weaver earned Player of the Year honors in 1954, when she hit a .429 average to set an AAGPBL single-season record. Besides this, her .429 mark was the highest Professional American Baseball batting average collected by any player in a single season in a minimum of 300 at-bat appearances.

== Early life ==
A native of Metropolis, Illinois, Joanne Weaver was the daughter of minor league pitcher Lloyd Weaver and Elsie (Dummeier) Weaver. At the age of 11, she began playing softball with her sisters Betty and Jean. Their father tried to get them to play on a local boys' baseball team, with little success, until he managed to insert them into the Magnavox team of the Chicago industrial league, a successful fastpitch softball squad in which they finally started to play regularly. In 1950, Betty rejected a contract offer from the Chicago White Sox minor league system and opted to sign with the All-American Girls Professional Baseball League (AAGPBL). Betty was allocated to the Fort Wayne Daisies and her sisters joined her on the team a year later.

== AAGPBL career ==
Weaver appeared in one game in the 1950 season, which occurred before she turned 15 years old. She formally debuted at third base with the Daisies in the following 1951 season. She hit .276 in 53 games, showing a smooth, quick swing with good speed and above average base running instincts. Her fielding was the only skill lacking. Meanwhile, her sister Betty won batting titles in back-to-back seasons in 1950 and 1951, helping Fort Wayne to make the playoffs in these years.

Weaver's performance exploded in her second season. After moving to right field in 1952, she led all hitters with a .344 average, surpassing her sister Betty (.331), who led five offensive categories and earned the Player of the Year Award, while Joanne did not rank high in any other category. Both sisters were selected for the All-Star Team and helped Fort Wayne advance to the playoffs.

Weaver improved her fielding considerably in 1953, when she finished the year with a .952 average. Her hitting stayed about the same, which was good enough to win another batting title with a .346 average, ending second to Betty in total bases (187) and hits (142, two behind). Joanne also finished third in runs (79), stolen bases (70), and runs batted in (76). Fort Wayne added another playoff trip, and she made the All-Star Team again.

During the 1954 midseason the AAGPBL reduced the ball from 10.00 inches to the major league size, around 9.00 inches. The league also extended pitching distance from 56 feet to 60 feet and base paths from 75 feet to 85 feet. As a result, Joanne earned the Player of the Year Award and made the All-Star Team for the third consecutive year after setting season-records with 29 home runs and 254 total bases, while leading the league in hits (143), runs (109) and stolen bases (79). She finished second in doubles (16) and triples (4), and joined Eleanor Callow as the only players in the league's history to hit 20 home runs and steal 20 bases during a regular season. Weaver also hit a league-leading .429, which remains the highest professional baseball batting average posted in the 20th century.

The Fort Wayne Daisies advanced to the best-of-five game Championship Series. Previously in the playoffs, the Kalamazoo Lassies dispatched the South Bend Blue Sox in three games and Fort Wayne did the same with the Grand Rapids Chicks.

== 1954 Championship Title ==
In Game 1 of the AAGPBL Series, the Kalamazoo Lassies defeated the Fort Wayne Daisies 17–9 behind a four-hit, seven strong innings from June Peppas, who also helped herself by hitting 2-for-4, including one home run. Her teammates Carol Habben and Fern Shollenberger also slugged one each, while Chris Ballingall added a grand slam. Katie Horstman connected two home runs for the Daisies in a lost cause and Joanne Weaver slugged one. Pitching star Maxine Kline, who had posted an 18–7 record with a 3.23 ERA during the regular season, gave up 11 runs in six innings and was credited with the loss.

The Daisies evened the Series against the Lassies by winning Game 2, 11–4, after hitting five home runs off two pitchers. Horstman started the feat with a two-run home run to open the score in the first inning. In the rest of the game, Betty added two homers with five RBI, while Joanne and Jean Geissinger added solo shots. Nancy Mudge and Dorothy Schroeder homered for Kalamazoo, while Peppas, who played first base, hit a solo homer in three at-bats.

In Game 3, the Daisies defeated the Lassies, 8–7, fueled again by a heavy hitting performance by Joanne Weaver, who hit a double, a triple and a three-run home run in five at bats, driving in four runs. Peppas went 1-for-4 to spark a seventh inning three-run rally, but Fort Wayne came back in the bottom of the inning with two runs that marked the difference. Cordes relieved with the bases loaded in the seventh inning, but did not allow any damage for the remainder of the game.

In another close score, the Lassies evened the Series in Game 4 with a victory over the Daisies, 6–5. Cordes started again with her team against the wall, 2-to-1. This time properly warmed up, she hurled a complete game, allowing five runs on nine hits. Habben drove in two runs which marked the difference, while Kline suffered her second loss of the Series. Peppas contributed with a single, a double and one RBI in four at-bats.

In decisive Game 5, Peppas pitched a clutch complete game and went 3-for-5 with an RBI against her former Daisies team, winning by an 8–5 margin to give the Lassies the Championship title in the AAGPBL's last ever game. She received support from Balingall (3-for-4) and Schroeder, who drove in the winning run in the bottom of the eighth. Peppas finished with a .450 average and collected two of the three Lassies victories, to become the winning pitcher of the last game in the league's history.

The sisters Foss-Weaver were able to win the final five batting championships of the All-American Girls Professional Baseball League and two Player of the Year awards. With Helen Callaghan winning the batting title in 1945, the Fort Wayne Daisies amassed six batting crowns to set a league record. But while Fort Wayne made the playoffs in the last seven seasons of the league, the team struggled in the post-season and never won a Championship Title. In 1952 and 1953, the Daisies were knocked out in the first round after posting the best regular-season record.

== Bill Allington All-Stars ==
Once the league disbanded in 1954, Joanne Weaver was one of eleven players selected by former Daisies manager Bill Allington to play in the national touring team known as the All-Americans. The Allington All-Stars played 100 games between 1954 and 1958, each booked in a different town, against male teams, while traveling over 10,000 miles in the manager's station wagon and a Ford Country Sedan. Besides Weaver, the All-Americans included her sister Betty Foss, Joan Berger, Gloria Cordes, Jeanie Descombes, Gertrude Dunn, Jean Geissinger, Mary Froning, Katie Horstman, Maxine Kline, Dolores Lee, Magdalen Redman, Ruth Richard, Jean Smith, Dorothy Schroeder and Dolly Vanderlip, among others.

== Life after baseball ==
Following her baseball career, Joanne Weaver lived in Fort Wayne, Indiana for more than 30 years. In November 1988, the Weaver sisters received recognition when the Baseball Hall of Fame and Museum in Cooperstown, New York dedicated a permanent display to the entire league rather than any individual player.

In 1990 Joanne moved back to her hometown of Metropolis, Illinois, to be with her parents. Betty returned in 1994 while Jean moved back in 1995, allowing the three Weaver sisters to see each other every day. Betty died in 1998, at the age of 68, following complications related to Amyotrophic lateral sclerosis (Lou Gehrig's disease). Joanne died in 2000 at age 64 of the same disease that claimed her sister. Eight years later, Jean died at age 74.

Weaver was honored by Major League Baseball when the league named a conference room in her honor at its headquarters in New York in 2020.

== Career statistics ==
Batting

GP	AB	R	H	2B	3B	HR	RBI	SB	TB	BB	SO	BA	OBP	SLG	OPS
329	1220	226	438	52	17	38	234	174	638	93	89	**.359**	**.404**	.523	**.927**

Bold denotes category leader.

Fielding

GP	PO	A	E	TC	DP	FA
319	552	40	43	635	10	.932
