= Katie Horstman =

American baseball player (born 1935)

- Utility player
- Born: April 14, 1935 (age 91); Minster, Ohio, U.S.
- Bats: Right Throws: Right

Teams
- Kenosha Comets (1951); Fort Wayne Daisies (1951–1954)

Career highlights and awards
- All-Star Team (third base, 1953); Four playoff appearances (1951-'54); All-time rankings batting average (6th) home runs (11th); Women in Baseball – AAGPBL Permanent Display Baseball Hall of Fame and Museum (1988)

Catherine Horstman [″Horsey″] (born April 14, 1935) is a former female utility player who played from 1951 through 1954 in the All-American Girls Professional Baseball League (AAGPBL). Listed at 5 ft 7 in (1.70 m), 150 lb., she batted and threw right-handed.

== Early life ==
A native of Minster, Ohio, Horstman was the youngest girl in a home of six children. Whenever they played baseball she did it. She started to play on the Catholic Youth Organization softball team in Minster since the fifth grade. At 16, she was invited to tryouts for the All-American Girls Professional Baseball League, and signed a contract for $250 a month to play with the Kenosha Comets before the 1951 season.

== AAGPBL career ==
Horstman was a pitcher and catcher in the All-American Girls Professional Baseball League, being also able to play at third base and all outfield positions. As a hitter, she ranks in the AAGPBL all-time list with a career .286 average (6th) and 23 home runs (11th), despite playing just four of the league's twelve seasons. In four playoff appearances, Horstman was a .255 hitter (13-for-49) with three home runs and seven RBI in 15 games, including seven runs, three doubles and one stolen base, dividing her playing time at third base or catching.

Horstman started 1951 with Kenosha but was traded to the Fort Wayne Daisies during the midseason, playing for them until the demise of the league in 1954. In her rookie season, she pitched, caught and played at outfield, hitting a combined .256 batting average in 38 games, and going 3–0 with nine strikeouts and a 2.35 earned run average in six pitching appearances. Fort Wayne reached the playoffs, but lost to the South Bend Blue Sox in the first round, two games to one. Horstman saw more action in 1952, appearing at third base and pitching. She hit .250 in 90 games, and posted a 5–2 record with 28 strikeouts and a 2.35 ERA in ten decisions. The Daisies advanced to the playoffs for the second year in a row, this time finishing in first place with a 67–42 record, but again lost the first round, 2-to-1, to the Rockford Peaches.

In 1953, Horstman hit .292 with 46 runs batted in and 23 extrabases in 94 games, including 46 runs and a career-high 14 stolen bases. She also went 11–5 with 57 strikeouts and a 2.32 ERA in 17 games, being selected for the All-Star Team at third base. The Daisies won the title with a 66–39 mark. The explosive bats of Wilma Briggs and the sisters Betty Weaver Foss and Joanne Weaver provided the difference in the league. Briggs belted a league-lead nine home runs, while Joanne led in average (.346) and Betty in RBI (81) and stolen bases (80), but Fort Wayne lost for the third consecutive year in the first round, now with the Kalamazoo Lassies, 2-to-1. In the All-Star Game, played on July 14 at Memorial Park, the Daisies defeated the All-Star team in an 11-inning effort behind Jean Geissinger, who belted a walk-off home run, and Horstman, whose relief pitching silenced an All-Stars potential rally in the 9th inning.

During what turned out to be the league's final season, the girls hit a regulation-sized baseball. The strong Daisies lineup won the title with a 54–40 record. Once more, Joanne Weaver led all hitters with a .429 average and a best-ever 29 home runs, while her older sister Betty hit .352 with 14 homers and 54 RBI. Other contributions came from Geissinger, who hit a second-best .377 average with 26 homers and a league-high 91 RBI. Meanwhile, Horstman posted career numbers in average (.328), home runs (16), hits (98), doubles (13), RBI (55), runs (68), total bases (163) and slugging (.545). She played at third, caught and pitched, adding to her resume a 10–4 mark with 46 strikeouts and a 2.85 ERA. In the playoffs, Fort Wayne dispatched the Grand Rapids Chicks (2-to-1) and Kalamazoo did the same with the Blue Sox.

== 1954 Championship Title ==
In Game 1 of the AAGPBL Series, the Kalamazoo Lassies defeated the Fort Wayne Daisies 17–9 behind a four-hit, seven strong innings from June Peppas, who also helped herself by hitting 2-for-4, including one home run. Her teammates Carol Habben and Fern Shollenberger also slugged one each, and Chris Ballingall belted a grand slam. Maxine Kline, who had posted an 18–7 record with 3.23 ERA for the Daisies during the regular season, gave up 11 runs in six innings and was credited with the loss. Hortsman connected two home runs for the Daisies, and her teammate Joanne Weaver slugged one. The Daisies bounced back in Game 2, hitting five home runs against the Lassies to win, 11–4. Horstman started the feat with a two-run home run to open the score in the first inning. In the rest of the game, Betty Weaver Foss added two home runs with five RBI, while her sister Joanne and Geissinger added solo shots. Peppas, Nancy Mudge and Dorothy Schroeder homered for Kalamazoo.

In Game 3, the Daisies defeated the Lassies, 8–7, fueled again by a heavy hitting performance by Joanne Weaver, who hit a double, a triple and a three-run home run in five at bats, driving in four runs. In Game 4, starter Gloria Cordes helped Kalamazoo to tie the series, pitching a complete game victory over the Daisies, 6–5. Habben drove in two runs which marked the difference, while Kline suffered her second loss of the Series. In decisive Game 5, Peppas pitched a clutch complete game and went 3-for-5 with an RBI against her former Daisies team, winning by an 8–5 margin to give the Lassies the Championship title in the AAGPBL's last ever game. She received support from Ballingall (3-for-4) and Schroeder, who drove in the winning run in the bottom of the eighth. Peppas finished with a .450 average in the Series and collected two of the three Lassies victories, to become the winning pitcher of the last game in the league's history.

== Allington All-Stars ==
When the league was unable to continue in 1955, Horstman joined several other players selected by former Daisies manager Bill Allington to play in the national touring team known as the All-Americans All-Stars. The team played 100 games, each booked in a different town, against male teams, while traveling over 10,000 miles in the manager's station wagon and a Ford Country Sedan. Besides Horstman, the Allington All-Stars included players as Joan Berger, Gloria Cordes, Jeanie Descombes, Betty Foss, Mary Froning, Jean Geissinger, Gertrude Dunn, Maxine Kline, Dolores Lee, Magdalen Redman, Ruth Richard, Dorothy Schroeder, Jean Smith, Dolly Vanderlip and Joanne Weaver, among others.

== Statistics ==
=== Batting ===
GP	AB	R	H	2B	3B	HR	RBI	SB	BB	SO	BA	OBP	SLG	OPS
308	1057	164	302	42	14	23	150	28	104	61	.286	.350	.420	.770

=== Pitching ===
GP	W	L	W-L%	ERA	IP	H	ER	BB	SO	WHIP
49	29	11	.725	2.50	313.0	202	87	122	140	1.0351

=== Combined fielding ===
GP	PO	A	E	TC	DP	FA
245	307	411	63	781	28	.919

== Life after baseball ==
In the 1960s, Horstman graduated from Medical Record Librarian School. She later joined the Franciscan Sisters of the Sacred Heart religious order for five years, to become the first nun in the United States to earn a Bachelor of Science degree in physical education. For the next decade, she taught physical education in Illinois, Indiana and Ohio before returning to her hometown of Minster, where she initiated girls sports programs, including volleyball, gymnastics, basketball, track and field, cross country and softball. By 1980, she focused in coaching on track and cross country. For the next five years, her girls teams never lost a track meet. After being runner-up State Champions in 1975, the inaugural year of girls track and field, her track team won five consecutive state championships (eight overall). She also guided her cross-country running squad to two state championships. Ending up 25 years in Minster, she moved to Los Angeles, California, where she oriented a clinical social work method to the sports area.

Horstman has been named Midwest Athletic Conference League Coach in all sports numerous times, and has been inducted in five halls of fame in baseball and track. In 1988, she attended to the opening of a permanent display at the Baseball Hall of Fame and Museum in Cooperstown, New York that honors those who were part of the All-American Girls Professional Baseball League. She gained induction in the Ohio Women's Hall of Fame, and also is the first woman honored in the Ohio Track Hall of Fame and the first woman elected into the National Track and Field Hall of Fame.
