= Carol Brown (baseball) =

American baseball player

Carol Brown was an All-American Girls Professional Baseball League player.

== Notes ==
- Brown appears as a member of the Fort Wayne Daisies club during its 1953 season. Nevertheless, the league stopped individual achievements after 1948, so individual accomplishments are complete only through 1948.
- She is part of the AAGPBL permanent display at the Baseball Hall of Fame and Museum at Cooperstown, New York opened in 1988, which is dedicated to the entire league rather than any individual figure.
