= Betty Foss =

American baseball player (1929–1998)

- First base / Outfield
- Born: May 10, 1929; Metropolis, Illinois, U.S.
- Died: February 8, 1998 (aged 68); Metropolis, Illinois, U.S.
- Batted: Both Threw: Right-handed

debut
- 1950

Last appearance
- 1954

Career statistics
- Batting average: .342
- Hits: 649
- Home runs: 32
- Runs batted in: 312
- Stolen bases: 294
- Stats at Baseball Reference

Teams
- Fort Wayne Daisies (1950–1954)

Career highlights and awards
- Player of the Year Award (1952); 2× AAGPBL All-Star Team (1952–1953); 2× AAGPBL batting champion (1950–1951); Rookie of the Year Award (1950); AAGPBL records: All-time leader in doubles: 117

Betty "Fossey" Weaver-Foss (May 10, 1929 – February 8, 1998) was an infielder and outfielder who played from 1950 through 1954 in the All-American Girls Professional Baseball League (AAGPBL). Listed at 5 ft 10 in (1.78 m), 180 lb., she was a switch-hitter and threw right-handed. She started her career as Betty Weaver but changed her last name to Foss after marrying. Her younger sisters, Jean and Joanne, also played in the league. In her five-season career, she set records for doubles and hits, with three seasons seeing her lead the league in the former category while setting a single-season record for hits in 1953).

== Overview profile ==
Foss enjoyed an outstanding career during the final five years of the All-American Girls Professional Baseball League. She won batting titles in back-to-back seasons in 1950 and 1951 and consistently ranked among the top 10 sluggers and best base stealers. Fossie, as friends and fans often called her, was a steady and productive hitter, a solid and speedy outfielder, and a skilled defender at first base. Gifted with a keen eye and a quick swing, she posted a .342 batting average in 498 games, being surpassed only by her younger sister Joanne, who set an all-time record with a .359 mark.

Besides scoring 401 runs and driving in another 312 runs, Foss topped the league in doubles three times. She holds the single-season records for hits, doubles and triples, and also set a record for career doubles (117). She collected 294 stolen bases and is only one of six players to have hit 30 or more career home runs (32). Her career .963 fielding average as an infielder would have been higher except for her rookie season at third base, when she committed 47 errors in 374 chances. Her fielding average at first base and in the outfield never dropped below .964. A two-time All-Star, she won the Rookie of the Year (1950) and Player of the Year (1952) awards, combining with her sister Joanne to capture the final five batting championships of the league. Her playing accomplishments helped her club to make the playoffs in these years and win three straight AAGPBL pennants beginning in 1952.

== Early life ==
A native of Metropolis, Illinois, Betty began playing sandlot ball with her younger sisters at a very early age. Their father, former minor league ballplayer Lloyd Weaver, tried to get them to play in a boys' baseball team without success. The sisters finally started to play fast-pitch softball on a regular basis. Determined to stay together, the trio played for the Magnavox softball team of the Chicago industrial league before joining the All-American Girls Professional Baseball League. In 1950, a Chicago White Sox scout wanted to sign Betty to a minor league contract, but at the same time she received a proposal from the All-American Girls Professional Baseball League to play for the Fort Wayne Daisies. She opted to stay in the women's league and joined the Fort Wayne team at the start of the 1950 season. The next season, Jean and Joanne would join the Daisies' roster.

== AAGPBL career ==
As a rookie in 1950 Foss had a significant and immediate impact in the league. She won the batting title with a .346 average, and led all hitters with 24 doubles and a robust .471 slugging percentage, 35 points ahead of Sophie Kurys. Foss also finished second with 125 hits (five behind Kurys), tied for third in home runs (five), finished fourth in total bases (162) and runs batted in (61), while tying for sixth in stolen bases (64) and for eighth in runs scored (64). She won the Rookie of the Year honors, but missed the All-Star Team in favor of Fern Shollenberger, an outstanding defender at third base who constantly paced the league in fielding percentage and number of double plays turned.

Foss had increased success in her second season. After moving to first base in 1951, she won her second consecutive batting title with a .368 average, to become the first repeat batting champion in the league since Dorothy Kamenshek, who did it both in 1946 and 1947. Foss also led the league with 34 doubles and 176 total bases, and tied for first place in home runs (four) with Eleanor Callow and Alice Pollitt. She also finished fifth in RBI (78), seventh in stolen bases (60) and tied for fourth in runs (77), but again was denied an All-Star spot, this time to Kamenshek, a batting average runner-up in 1950 (.334) and 1951 (.335). Her 34 doubles in a season are the league record.

In 1952, Foss received the highest honor of the league when she earned the Player of the Year Award. She led all batters in runs (81), hits (137), doubles (26), triples (17) and RBI (74), and was second in stolen bases (80), while hitting a solid .331 in 106 games to finish second in the batting race behind her sister Joanne (.344). Her 17 triples (more than the next two players combined) is a single-season record. Finally, she gained her first All-Star selection at first base. The All-Star team faced the South Bend Blue Sox, the league's 1951 playoff champions. The All-Stars prevailed, 7–6, when Foss scored the eventual winning run on an RBI-single by Doris Sams in the top of the 9th inning.

Foss made her second straight All-Star appearance in 1953, and for the third consecutive year set a single-season mark after collecting 144 hits. She also led the league in stolen bases (80), in runs (99) for the second consecutive year, and in total bases (195) for the third year in a row. Besides this, she ended third in triples (seven), fifth in RBI (65) and sixth in home runs (five). For the first time in her career, she failed to lead the league in doubles. Foss hit 20 doubles, three behind leader Eleanor Callow. She dropped to a .321 average, while her sister Joanne won the title with a .346 mark.

In 1954 Foss hit .352, ending fourth in the batting crown race, while her sister Joanne clinched the title for her third straight season with a .429 average, to become the only player in AAGPBL history to hit .400 or more in a regular season. Foss scored 80 runs, ending second to Joanne (109), and tied for sixth place with 13 doubles. She also finished second in stolen bases (34), fourth in hits (117) and fifth in total bases (172).

The Fort Wayne Daisies advanced to the best-of-five game Championship Series. Previously in the playoffs, the Kalamazoo Lassies dispatched the South Bend Blue Sox in three games and Fort Wayne did the same with the Grand Rapids Chicks.

== 1954 Championship Title ==
In Game 1 of the AAGPBL Series, the Kalamazoo Lassies defeated the Fort Wayne Daisies 17–9 behind a four-hit, seven strong innings from June Peppas, who also helped herself by hitting 2-for-4, including one home run. Her teammates Carol Habben, Fern Shollenberger and Chris Ballingall, who hit a grand slam, also slugged one each. Katie Horstman connected two home runs for the Daisies in a lost cause, and her teammate Joanne Weaver slugged one. Pitching star Maxine Kline, who had posted an 18–7 record with 3.23 ERA during the regular season, gave up 11 runs in six innings and was credited with the loss.

The Daisies evened the Series against the Lassies winning Game 2, 11–4, after hitting five home runs off two pitchers. Gloria Cordes started for Kalamazoo, but due to a mix-up over the game's starting time the umpires did not allow her to warm up (supposedly there would be a half hour delay). Starting cold, Cordes allowed five runs before getting a batter out. After a leadoff walk to Mary Weddle, Horstman belted a home run for a 2–0 Fort Wayne lead. Then Ruth Richard and Joanne Weaver hit back-to-back singles, and Betty Foss hit a three-run homer for a 5–0 edge. Elaine Roth relieved Cordes and completed the game. But the Lassies hit three more home runs, one each by Jean Geissinger and the Foss-Weaver sisters. Kalamazoo discounted the margin with leadoff homers by Nancy Mudge, Peppas (playing at first base) and Dorothy Schroeder, but the game's outcome was never in doubt.

In Game 3, the Daisies defeated the Lassies, 8–7, fueled again by a heavy hitting performance by Joanne Weaver, who hit a double, a triple and a three-run home run in five at-bats, driving in four runs. Peppas went 1-for-4 to spark a seventh inning three-run rally, but Fort Wayne came back in the bottom of the inning with two runs that marked the difference. Cordes relieved with the bases loaded in the seventh inning but did not allow any damage for the remainder of the game.

In another close score, the Lassies evened the Series in Game 4 with a victory over the Daisies, 6–5. Cordes started again with her team against the wall, 2-to-1. This time properly warmed up, she hurled a complete game, allowing five runs on nine hits. Habben drove in two runs which marked the difference, while Kline suffered her second loss of the Series. Peppas contributed with a single, a double and one RBI in four at-bats.

In decisive Game 5, Peppas pitched a clutch complete game and went 3-for-5 with an RBI against her former Daisies team, winning by an 8–5 margin to give the Lassies the Championship title in the AAGPBL's last ever game. She received support from Ballingall (3-for-4) and Schroeder, who drove in the winning run in the bottom of the eighth. Peppas finished with a .450 average and collected two of the three Lassies victories, to become the winning pitcher of the last game in the league's history. In the end, the inspired Lassies rose to the challenge and batted a .337 average as a team. On the other hand, the usually heavy-hitting Daisies averaged only .275.

== Bill Allington All-Stars ==
Once the league disbanded, Foss joined several other players selected by former Daisies manager Bill Allington to play in the national touring team known as the All-Americans All-Stars. The team played 100 games, each booked in a different town, against male teams, while traveling over 10,000 miles in the manager's station wagon and a Ford Country Sedan. Besides Foss, the Allington All-Stars included players as Joan Berger, Gloria Cordes, Jeanie Descombes, Gertrude Dunn, Mary Froning, Jean Geissinger, Katie Horstman, Maxine Kline, Dolores Lee, Magdalen Redman, Ruth Richard, Dorothy Schroeder, Jean Smith, Dolly Vanderlip, and her younger sister, Joanne, among others.

== Life after baseball ==
Foss returned to Fort Wayne, Indiana to work for a pump company until retiring in 1994. She later moved back to her hometown of Metropolis, Illinois, where she died three years later at the age of 68, following complications related to Amyotrophic lateral sclerosis (Lou Gehrig's disease), the same disease which would claim Joanne's life in March 2000.

== Career statistics ==
Batting

GP	AB	R	H	2B	3B	HR	RBI	TB	SB	BB	SO	BA	OBP	SLG	OPS
498	1898	401	649	**117**	30	32	312	922	294	199	176	.342	**.404**	.486	.890

Bold denotes category leader.

Fielding

GP	PO	A	E	TC	DP	FA
495	3638	330	151	4119	194	.963

== Facts ==
=== A team record ===
The sisters Foss-Weaver were able to win the final five batting championships of the All-American Girls Professional Baseball League. With Helen Callaghan winning the title in 1945, the Fort Wayne Daisies amassed six batting crowns to set a league record. But while Fort Wayne made the playoffs in the last seven seasons of the league, the team struggled in the post-season and never won a Championship Title. In 1952 and 1953, the Daisies were knocked out in the first round after posting the best regular-season record.

=== Players Association ===
When the All-American Girls Professional Baseball League was unable to continue in 1955, its history and its significance were soon forgotten. Many people in the 1950s thought that women were not supposed to play baseball, so most female athletes competed in other fields of endeavor. Finally, in 1980, former pitcher June Peppas launched a newsletter project to get in touch with friends, teammates, and opponents, that resulted in the league's first-ever reunion in Chicago, Illinois in 1982. Starting from that reunion, a Players Association was formed five years later and many former players of the defunct league continued to enjoy reunions.

=== Hall of Fame honors ===
The AAGPBL Players Association movement helped to bring the league story to the public eye. The association was largely responsible for the opening of a permanent display at the Baseball Hall of Fame and Museum in Cooperstown, New York since November 5, 1988, that honors those who were part of this unique experience.

=== A League of Their Own ===
The 1992 film A League of Their Own is about the first season of the All-American Girls Professional Baseball League. While the film does not use real names, filmmaker Penny Marshall seemed to be aiming for realism, as her film includes fake newsreel footage and pseudo-documentary present day scenes at the beginning and end of the fictitious story. A League of Their Own itself was inspired by the 1987 documentary of the same title, written and produced by Kelly Candaele, one of the five sons of the aforementioned Helen Callaghan. Candaele also collaborated with Kim Wilson in the story for the film. The AAGPBL players were relatively unknown until the Marshall's film was exhibited for the first time. In the AAGPBL Players Association annual reunions since 1998, it is usual to hear the original AAGPBL players singing We're the members of the All-American League. We come from cities near and far. We've got Canadians, Irish ones, and Swedes. We're all for one, we're one for all. We're all Americans.
