= Wilma Briggs =

- Left fielder
- Born: November 6, 1930; East Greenwich, Rhode Island, U.S.
- Died: September 4, 2023 (aged 92)
- Batted: Left Threw: Right

Career statistics
- Batting average: .258
- Home runs: 43
- Runs batted in: 301
- Games played: 691

Teams
- Fort Wayne Daisies (1948–1953); South Bend Blue Sox (1954)

Career highlights and awards
- Ranks second in the all-time home runs list; Ranks 14th in the RBI all-time list; Best defensive outfielder (1951); Season-leader in home runs (1953, nine)

Wilma Briggs (November 6, 1930 – September 4, 2023) was an American left fielder in the All-American Girls Professional Baseball League (AAGPBL) who played from 1948 through 1954. Listed at 5' 4", 138 lb., she batted left-handed and threw right-handed. She led the league in home runs during the 1953 season, ranks second in the all-time home runs list (43) behind Eleanor Callow (55) and over Dorothy Schroeder (42) and Jean Geissinger (41), and was one of only 14 players to collect 300 or more career runs batted in, yet she was never selected to the All-Star team. Briggs was inducted into the Rhode Island Heritage Hall of Fame in 2013.

== Professional career ==
Briggs entered the league in 1948 with the Fort Wayne Daisies, playing for them six years before joining the South Bend Blue Sox in 1954. She started at right field for the Daisies during her rookie season and stayed there until the left fielder broke an ankle while sliding into second base. She was then moved to left field for the rest of her career, with the exception of two weeks at first base in the 1952 season.

During her first two professional baseball seasons, Briggs hit two home runs, but increased her output to a league-leading nine in 1953. She ranked second with 25 homers in 1954, in the AAGPBL's last ever season. Briggs hit the only home run at Indiana's Playland Park during the 1949 season, a walk-off in the ninth inning, to defeat the Blue Sox. In 1951 she was voted the best defensive outfielder with a .987 fielding average. Briggs helped Fort Wayne win pennants in both 1952 and 1953, and spent her final season in 1954 with South Bend.

== Out of the field ==
The AAGPBL folded in 1954, but there is now a permanent display at the Baseball Hall of Fame and Museum in Cooperstown, New York since November 5, 1988 that honors those who were part of this unique experience. Briggs, along with the rest of the league's girls, are now enshrined in the Hall. In 1990 Briggs became the first woman inducted into East Greenwich's Athletic Hall of Fame and was elected to the first AAGPBL Players Association Board of Directors. In 1991, she received the first annual Game of Legends Award for her 38 years of contributing to women's softball in Rhode Island. On November 20, 2021, Briggs was inducted into the Rhode Island Slow Pitch Hall of Fame.

A League of Their Own is a 1992 film about the first season of the All-American Girls Professional Baseball League. While the film does not use real names, the film includes fake newsreel footage and pseudo-documentary present day scenes at the beginning and end of the fictitious story. A League of Their Own itself was inspired by the 1987 documentary of the same title, written and produced by Kelly Candaele, one of the five sons of Helen Callaghan, who in 1945 won the AAGPBL batting championship with a .299 average.

Briggs died on September 4, 2023, at the age of 92.

== Career statistics ==
=== Batting ===
| GP | AB | R | H | 2B | 3B | HR | RBI | SB | BA | OBP | SLG |
|---|---|---|---|---|---|---|---|---|---|---|---|
| 691 | 2456 | 375 | 633 | 64 | 24 | 43 | 301 | 128 | .258 | .317 | .356 |

=== Fielding ===
| GP | PO | A | E | TC | DP | FA |
|---|---|---|---|---|---|---|
| 683 | 1092 | 65 | 44 | 1201 | 17 | .963 |

== Sources ==
- Biographical Dictionary of American Sports – David L. Porter. Publisher: Greenwood Press, 2000. Format: Hardcover, 2064pp. Language: English. ISBN 978-0-313-29884-4 W. C. Madden
- Encyclopedia of Women and Baseball – Leslie A. Heaphy, Laura Wulf, Mel Anthony May. Publisher: McFarland & Company, 2006. Format: Hardcover, 438pp. Language: English. ISBN 0-7864-2100-2
- Girls of Summer: The Real Story of the All American Girls Professional Baseball League – Lois Browne. Publisher: HarperCollins, 1992. Format: Hardcover, 212 pp. Language: English. ISBN 0-00-215838-8
- Women in Baseball: The Forgotten History – Gai Ingham Berlage, Charley Gerard. Publisher: Greenwood Publishing Group, 1994. Format: Hardcover, 224pp. Language: English. ISBN 978-0-275-94735-4
