= Bill Allington =

American baseball player

- Manager
- Born: October 26, 1903; St. Clair County, Michigan, U.S.
- Died: August 16, 1966 (aged 62); Tucson, Arizona, U.S.
- Batted: Right Threw: Right

Career statistics
- Managing record: 583-398
- Winning percentage: .594
- Stats at Baseball Reference

Teams
- Rockford Peaches (1945–46, 1948–52); Fort Wayne Daisies (1953–54)

Career highlights and awards
- Four Championship Titles (1945, 1948–50); Eight Playoff appearances (1946, 1948–54); All-time leader in victories (583)

William Baird Allington (October 26, 1903 – August 17, 1966) was an American minor league baseball player and manager. Listed at 5' 9" and 160 pounds, Allington batted and threw right-handed. He was born in St. Clair County, Michigan.

== Playing career ==
Allington spent 31 years in baseball as a player (15), coach (4) and manager (12). He started his professional career as an outfielder, playing from 1926 through 1940 with ten teams of four different leagues. Between 1926 and 1934, he played in the Blue Ridge League (1926–27), Western League (1926–28, 1930–32), Southern Association (1929, 1933–34) and Pacific Coast League (1929–30). He also played nine years in the California Winter League circuit (1932–40).

Allington hit .300 or more in eight of his nine minor league years career. His most productive season came in 1931, when he led the Western League hitters with a .374 batting average, even though he was left off of the All-Star Team after leading the league in several offensive statistics, including stolen bases (36), triples (23), total bases (335) and runs scored (167), while adding nine home runs and 92 runs batted in. In addition, he ended fifth in doubles (49), and his .984 fielding percentage was the second-best of any starting outfielder in the Western League that season.

Allington posted a career-average of .327 in 1145 games, including a .508 slugging percentage, and hit .273 with a .494 slugging in the California Winter League.

== Coaching and managing career ==
Following his playing career, Allington coached in the minors from 1941 to 1944, before landing in the All-American Girls Professional Baseball League, to become the most successful manager in the league's history. With Allington at the helm, the Rockford Peaches reached the playoff six times, winning the AAGPBL Championship Title in 1945 and in consecutive years from 1948 to 1950. Allington later managed the Fort Wayne Daisies in 1953 and 1954, leading them to the playoffs in both seasons.

From 1945 to 1954, Allington posted a 583–398 record for a .594 winning percentage, never had a losing season and is the all-time leader in victories in the AAGPBL. He also was an active scout talent for the league.

The AAGPBL folded in 1954, but the following year Allington formed two women's touring teams called Allington's All-Stars, a barnstorming remnant of the league. The Allington All-Stars played 100 games between 1955 and 1958, each booked in a different town, against male teams, while traveling over 10,000 miles in the manager's station wagon and a Ford Country Sedan. The Allington All-Stars included players as Joan Berger, Gloria Cordes, Jeanie Descombes, Gertrude Dunn, Betty Foss, Mary Froning, Jean Geissinger, Katie Horstman, Maxine Kline, Dolores Lee, Magdalen Redman, Ruth Richard, Dorothy Schroeder, Jean Smith, Dolly Vanderlip and Joanne Weaver, among others.

== Sources ==
- The All-American Girls Professional Baseball League Record Book: Comprehensive Hitting, Fielding and Pitching Statistics. – W. C. Madden. Publisher: McFarland & Company, 2000. Format: Hardcover, 250 pp. Language: English. ISBN 978-0-7864-0597-8
- Encyclopedia of Minor League Baseball – Lloyd Johnson, Miles Wolf. Publisher: Baseball America, 2007. Format: Paperback, 767pp. Language: English. ISBN
- The Pacific Coast League: A Statistical History, 1903-1957 – Dennis Snelling. Publisher: McFarland & Company, 1995. Format: Paperback, 392pp. Language: English. ISBN 978-0-7864-0045-4
- Women in Baseball – Gai Ingham Berlage. Publisher: Praeger Trade, 1994. Format: Hardcover, 224 pp. Language: English. ISBN 0-275-94735-1
