= 1951 All-American Girls Professional Baseball League season =

- League: All-American Girls Professional Baseball League
- Sport: Baseball
- Teams: Eight

Regular season
- Season champions: Grand Rapids Chicks (first half); South Bend Blue Sox (second half)

Shaugnessy playoffs
- Champions: South Bend Blue Sox

AAGPBL seasons
- 1950 1952

The 1951 All-American Girls Professional Baseball League season marked the ninth season of the circuit. The teams Battle Creek Belles, Fort Wayne Daisies, Grand Rapids Chicks, Kalamazoo Lassies, Kenosha Comets, Peoria Redwings, Rockford Peaches and South Bend Blue Sox competed through a 112-game schedule, while the Shaugnessy playoffs featured the top four teams from each half of the regular season.

In 1951, many things changed in relation to the previous season, when attendance began to decline dramatically. The Racine Belles franchise was moved to Battle Creek, Michigan, while the Chicago Colleens and Springfield Sallies traveling teams were disbanded. Betty Foss of Fort Wayne led all hitters for the second year in a row with a .368 batting average, breaking her own single-season record of .346 set in her rookie season. Foss also topped the league with 34 doubles, setting an all-time single-season record that would never be surpassed. Nine pitchers recorded an earned run average below 2.00, while Rose Gacioch of Rockford was the only one to gain 20 victories during the year. The Player of the Year Award was given to South Bend pitcher Jean Faut, who posted a 15–7 record with a 1.33 ERA and a league-leading 135 strikeouts, including a perfect game against Rockford on July 21 of that season.

During the best-of-three series, first-place South Bend defeated third-place Fort Wayne, two games to one, while second-place Grand Rapids was swept by fourth-place Rockford in two games. South Bend pitching star Jean Faut drove in a run and held Fort Wayne to a run in Game 1, and later struck out nine batters and allowed one run in Game 3 to advance to the finals. In the other series, Rockford's Helen Nicol gave up six hits and shut out Grand Rapids in the first contest, while Marie Mansfield hurled a 7–6, 11-inning victory to defeat the Chicks.

The final series took all five games to decide the champion team. Rockford held a 2–0 advantage in the series and looked to take it all, but South Bend rebounded and won the last three games to clinch the title. In Game 3, Faut stopped the Peaches in their tracks, pitching a six-hit, 3–2 victory, and picked up the win in a seven-inning relief effort in Game 5 to continue her winning ways. South Bend batted a collective .275 average in the finals, with Jane Stoll leading the offense with a .333 average (6-for-18) and six RBI, while Senaida Wirth batted .412 (7-for-17) and scored four runs, and Betty Wagoner hit .389 (7-for-18) with five runs.

In 1951, the AAGPBL attendance declined for the third straight year. As revenues fell, individual teams' funds were limited to advertise nationally as a way of recruiting scattered baseball talent. With no centralized control of publicity, promotion, rookie training teams, and equalization of player talent, the League began to break down. The Kenosha and Peoria franchises withdrew at the end of the year, leaving the league with six teams for the next season.

== Teams ==
1951 All-American Girls Professional Baseball League Teams
Team	City	Stadium
Battle Creek Belles	Battle Creek, Michigan	Bailey Park
Fort Wayne Daisies	Fort Wayne, Indiana	Memorial Park
Grand Rapids Chicks	Grand Rapids, Michigan	Bigelow Field
Kalamazoo Lassies	Kalamazoo, Michigan	Lindstrom Field
Kenosha Comets	Kenosha, Wisconsin	Simmons Field
Peoria Redwings	Peoria, Illinois	Peoria Stadium
Rockford Peaches	Rockford, Illinois	Beyer Stadium
South Bend Blue Sox	South Bend, Indiana	Playland Park

== Map of teams ==
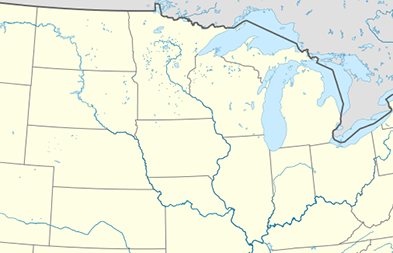
All-American Girls Professional Baseball League teams

== Standings ==
=== First half ===
Rank	Team	W	L	W-L%	GB
1	Grand Rapids Chicks	40	13	.755	—
2	Fort Wayne Daisies	34	17	.667	5
3	South Bend Blue Sox	38	22	.633	5½
4	Rockford Peaches	31	26	.544	11
5	Peoria Redwings	28	25	.528	12
6	Kenosha Comets	21	36	.368	21
7	Kalamazoo Lassies	19	38	.333	23
8	Battle Creek Belles	11	45	.196	30½

=== Second half ===
Rank	Team	W	L	W-L%	GB
1	South Bend Blue Sox	38	14	.731	—
2	Rockford Peaches	34	15	.694	2½
3	Fort Wayne Daisies	34	18	.654	4
4	Grand Rapids Chicks	31	22	.585	7½
5	Peoria Redwings	21	31	.404	17
6	Battle Creek Belles	19	35	.352	20
7	Kenosha Comets	15	35	.333	22
8	Kalamazoo Lassies	15	37	.288	23

=== Overall ===
Rank	Team	W	L	W-L%	GB
1	South Bend Blue Sox	76	36	.679	—
2	Grand Rapids Chicks	71	35	.670	2
3	Fort Wayne Daisies	68	35	.660	3½
4	Rockford Peaches	65	41	.613	8
5	Peoria Redwings	49	56	.467	23½
6	Kenosha Comets	36	71	.336	37½
7	Kalamazoo Lassies	34	75	.312	40½
8	Battle Creek Belles	30	80	.273	45

== Postseason ==
First round Best of three series
1	South Bend Blue Sox	2
3	Fort Wayne Daisies	1
2	Grand Rapids Chicks	0
4	Rockford Peaches	2

Second round Best of five series
1	South Bend Blue Sox	3
4	Rockford Peaches	2

== Batting statistics ==
Statistic	Player	Record
Batting average	Betty Foss (FW); Dorothy Kamenshek (ROC); Eleanor Callow; Connie Wisniewski (GR); Charlene Pryer (SB); Doris Sams (KAL); Alice Pollitt (ROC); June Peppas (BC/KAL); Inez Voyce (GR); Doris Satterfield (GR); Ruth Richard (ROC); Evelyn Wawryshyn (FW); Joanne Weaver (FW); Wilma Briggs (FW); Senaida Wirth (SB); Delores Brumfield (KEN); Betty Wagoner (SB)	.368.345.326.326.312.306.299.285.285.279.277.277.276.275.274.273.274
Runs scored	Charlene Pryer (SB); Dorothy Harrell (ROC); Dorothy Kamenshek (ROC); Thelma Eisen (FW); Alice Pollitt (ROC); Marilyn Olinger (GR); Connie Wisniewski (GR); Betty Foss (FW); Senaida Wirth (SB); Betty Wagoner (SB); Eleanor Callow; Wilma Briggs (FW); Doris Satterfield (GR); Evelyn Wawryshyn (FW)	106; 91; 90; 88; 88; 82; 78; 77; 77; 77; 66; 64; 64; 60
Hits	Charlene Pryer (SB); Betty Foss (FW); Connie Wisniewski (GR); Eleanor Callow (ROC); Alice Pollitt (ROC); Dorothy Kamenshek (ROC); Doris Satterfield (GR); June Peppas (BC/KAL); Doris Sams (109); Evelyn Wawryshyn (FW); Wilma Briggs (FW); Inez Voyce (GR); Betty Wagoner (SB)	133; 126; 126; 124; 121; 117; 112; 109; 109; 108; 106; 106; 102
Doubles	Betty Foss (FW); Shirley Stovroff (SB); Thelma Eisen (FW); Eleanor Callow (ROC); Marjorie Pieper (PEO/BC); Doris Sams (KAL); Jane Stoll (SB); Connie Wisniewski (GR); Delores Brumfield (KEN); Inez Voyce (GR); Wilma Briggs (FW); Dorothy Kamenshek (ROC); Doris Satterfield (GR); June Peppas (BC/KAL)	34; 19; 17; 16; 16; 16; 15; 15; 14; 14; 12; 12; 12; 11
Triples	Eleanor Callow (ROC); Dorothy Kamenshek (ROC); Alice Pollitt (ROC); Doris Satterfield (GR); Connie Wisniewski (GR); Margaret Wenzell (KAL/BC); Jacquelyn Kelley (ROC); Elizabeth Mahon (SB); Marguerite Pearson (BC/KAL); Barbara Payne (KAL/BC/ROC); Inez Voyce (GR)	10; 9; 9; 9; 9; 7; 6; 5; 5; 5; 5
Home runs	Eleanor Callow (ROC); Betty Foss (FW); Alice Pollitt (ROC); Dorothy Schroeder (FW); Jean Lovell (KEN/KAL); Doris Sams (KAL); Doris Satterfield (GR); Jean Faut (SB); Jean Geissinger (FW); Jacquelyn Kelley (ROC); Margaret Russo (PEO); Doris Sams (KAL); Inez Voyce (GR); Joanne Weaver (FW)	4; 4; 4; 3; 2; 2; 2; 2; 2; 2; 2; 2; 2; 2
Runs batted in	Eleanor Callow (ROC); Elizabeth Mahon (SB); Doris Satterfield (GR); Ruth Richard (ROC); Betty Foss (FW); Lavonne Paire (GR); Shirley Stovroff (SB); Evelyn Wawryshyn (FW); Senaida Wirth (SB); Margaret Russo (PEO); Joyce Hill (PEO); Inez Voyce (GR); Jane Stoll (SB); Alice Pollitt (ROC); Dorothy Schroeder (FW); Rita Briggs (PEO)	84; 68; 62; 60; 58; 56; 54; 54; 54; 51; 50; 49; 47; 45; 45; 44
Stolen bases	Charlene Pryer (SB); Dorothy Harrell (ROC); Thelma Eisen (FW); Senaida Wirth (SB); Dorothy Kamenshek; Alice Pollitt (ROC); Betty Foss (FW); Elizabeth Mahon (SB); Betty Wagoner (SB); Evelyn Wawryshyn (FW); Margaret Russo (PEO)	129; 91; 88; 69; 63; 61; 60; 53; 50; 50; 45
Total bases	Betty Foss (FW); Eleanor Callow (ROC); Connie Wisniewski (GR); Alice Pollitt (ROC); Doris Satterfield (GR); Dorothy Kamenshek; Charlene Pryer (SB); Inez Voyce (GR); Doris Sams (KAL); June Peppas (BC/KAL); Elizabeth Mahon (SB); Margaret Russo (PEO); Jacquelyn Kelley (ROC); Evelyn Wawryshyn (FW); Jane Stoll (SB); Margaret Wenzell (KAL/BC)	176; 172; 159; 158; 148; 147; 147; 136; 135; 131; 125; 124; 117; 116; 112; 105

== Pitching statistics ==
Statistic	Player	Record
Wins	Rose Gacioch (ROC); Maxine Kline (FW); Helen Nicol (ROC); Mirtha Marrero (FW); Margaret Holgerson (GR); Marie Mansfield (ROC); Jean Faut (SB); Lillian Faralla (SB); Alice Hohlmayer (PEO); Pat Scott (FW); Mary Lou Studnicka (GR); Jaynne Bittner (GR); Alma Ziegler (GR)	20; 18; 18; 17; 16; 16; 15; 15; 15; 15; 15; 15; 14
Winning percentage	Louise Arnold (SB); Dorothy Mueller (SB); Maxine Kline (FW); Lillian Faralla (SB); Mary Lou Studnicka (GR); Rose Gacioch (ROC); Jaynne Bittner (GR); Helen Nicol (ROC); Jean Faut (SB); Pat Scott (FW); Mirtha Marrero (FW)	.833.833.818.789.750.741.727.720.682.682.680
Earned run average	Dorothy Naum (KEN); Alma Ziegler (GR); Jean Faut (SB); Margaret Holgerson (GR); Dorothy Mueller (SB); Rose Gacioch (ROC); Lillian Faralla (SB); Maxine Kline (FW); Ruth Williams (KAL); Alice Hohlmayer (PEO); Pat Scott (FW); Earlene Risinger (GR); Nancy Warren (PEO); Mirtha Marrero (FW)	1.14; 1.26; 1.33; 1.53; 1.56; 1.68; 1.85; 1.95; 1.96; 2.02; 2.13; 2.14; 2.20; 2.24
Strikeouts	Jean Faut (SB); Margaret Holgerson (GR); Marie Mansfield (ROC); Jean Marlowe (KEN); Georgette Vincent (SB); Barbara Rotvig (KEN); Mirtha Marrero (FW); Nancy Warren (PEO); Mary Lou Studnicka (GR); Gloria Cordes (BC/KAL); Maxine Kline (FW); Helen Nicol (ROC); Pat Scott (FW); Alma Ziegler (GR); Erma Bergmann (BC); Ruth Williams (KAL)	135; 123; 121; 116; 113; 93; 87; 79; 72; 70; 69; 67; 62; 62; 59; 59
Complete games	Migdalia Pérez (BC); Rose Gacioch (ROC); Helen Nicol (ROC); Alice Hohlmayer (PEO); Alma Ziegler (GR); Margaret Holgerson (GR); Jean Marlowe (KEN); Erma Bergmann (BC); Jean Faut (SB); Maxine Kline (FW); Mirtha Marrero (FW)	26; 25; 23; 22; 22; 21; 21; 20; 20; 20; 20
Shutouts	Rose Gacioch (ROC); Alma Ziegler (GR); Jean Faut (SB); Alice Hohlmayer (PEO); Margaret Holgerson (GR); Maxine Kline (FW); Jaynne Bittner (GR); Lillian Faralla (SB); Mary Lou Studnicka (GR); Ruth Williams (KAL)	9; 8; 7; 6; 5; 5; 4; 4; 4; 4
Games pitched	Migdalia Pérez (BC); Josephine Hasham (PEO); Marie Mansfield (ROC); Elaine Roth (KAL); Rose Gacioch (ROC); Alice Hohlmayer (PEO); Mirtha Marrero (FW); Eleanor Moore (FW); Jean Marlowe (KEN); Helen Nicol (ROC); Nancy Warren (FW/PEO); Gloria Cordes (BC/KAL); Frances Janssen (FW/PEO/BC//KAL); Pat Scott (FW)	32; 30; 30; 30; 29; 29; 29; 29; 28; 28; 27; 26; 26; 26
Innings pitched	Migdalia Pérez (BC); Rose Gacioch (ROC); Josephine Hasham (PEO); Helen Nicol (ROC); Mirtha Marrero (FW); Jean Marlowe (KEN); Alice Hohlmayer (PEO); Marie Mansfield (ROC); Erma Bergmann (BC); Margaret Holgerson (GR); Maxine Kline (FW); Jean Faut (SB); Pat Scott (FW); Nancy Warren (FW/PEO)	237; 231; 218; 214; 213; 211; 209; 202; 200; 200; 194; 190; 190; 188

== See also ==
- 1951 Major League Baseball season
- 1951 Nippon Professional Baseball season
