= 1950 All-American Girls Professional Baseball League season =

- League: All-American Girls Professional Baseball League
- Sport: Baseball
- Teams: Eight

Regular season
- Season champions: Rockford Peaches

Shaugnessy playoffs
- Champions: Rockford Peaches

AAGPBL seasons
- ← 1949 1951 →

The 1950 All-American Girls Professional Baseball League season marked the eighth season of the circuit. The teams Fort Wayne Daisies, Grand Rapids Chicks, Kenosha Comets, Muskegon Lassies, Peoria Redwings, Racine Belles, Rockford Peaches and South Bend Blue Sox competed through a 112-game schedule.

In 1950 the league used a livelier 10 inches ball. Finally, the batting was able to take advantage of the pitching, when five hitters reached the .300 average mark for the year. Fort Wayne's rookie Betty Foss led the circuit with a .346 average, to set a new season mark.

Nevertheless, three no-hitters were recorded in the season, two of them by Jean Cione of Kenosha during the month of August. Her first was a 12-inning gem against Grand Rapids, and the second came in a seven-inning shutout over Racine. Previously, Kenosha's Ruby Stephens had pitched a nine-inning no-no against the Lassies in July.

Grand Rapids' Alma Ziegler posted a 19–7 record and a solid 1.38 earned run average in 35 games, leading all pitchers in winning percentage (.732). She also tossed 43 straight shutout innings, and finished second in ERA behind South Bend's Jean Faut (1.12). Ziegler was honored with the Player of the Year Award.

The league returned to the Shaugnessy format during the playoffs, featuring the top four teams of the season. In the best-of-five first round, first place Rockford defeated Kenosha and second place Fort Wayne defeated fourth place Grand Rapids. The final series took all seven games to decide the champion team. After winning the first two games, Rockford lost the next two games to Fort Wayne. Rockford took a 3–2 advantage in Game 5, but Fort Wayne won the next contest to send the series to a seventh game. Finally, Rockford never gave Fort Wayne a chance at another upset and won the series, four to three games. Helen Nicol was credited with three of the four victories of Rockford in the finals, including a shutout in decisive Game 7. Bill Allington guided the Peaches to their third title in a row, fourth overall, to set two all-time records for a manager.

In 1950 the AAGPBL declined in attendance for the second consecutive year. Poor financial management finally caught up to the league and it began to slide. At the end of the season, team directors voted to purchase the league from Arthur Meyerhoff and operate their teams independently. That season had been a nightmare for Muskegon, after registering the worst record in the circuit and a relocation during the midseason to Kalamazoo, Michigan, where the team was renamed the Kalamazoo Lassies. Besides this, the Racine franchise, a two-time champion and one of the four original teams, had to move to Battle Creek, Michigan. The team would be renamed the Battle Creek Belles for the next season.

== Teams ==
1950 All-American Girls Professional Baseball League Teams
| Team | City | Stadium |
| Fort Wayne Daisies | Fort Wayne, Indiana | Memorial Park |
| Grand Rapids Chicks | Grand Rapids, Michigan | Bigelow Field |
| Kalamazoo Lassies | Kalamazoo, Michigan | Lindstrom Field |
| Kenosha Comets | Kenosha, Wisconsin | Simmons Field |
| Peoria Redwings | Peoria, Illinois | Peoria Stadium |
| Racine Belles | Racine, Wisconsin | Horlick Field |
| Rockford Peaches | Rockford, Illinois | Beyer Stadium |
| South Bend Blue Sox | South Bend, Indiana | Playland Park |

== Map of teams ==
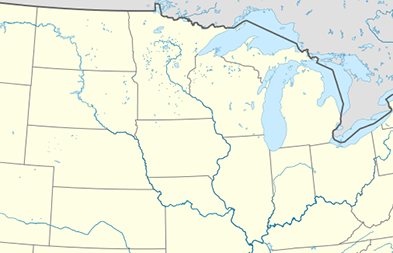
All-American Girls Professional Baseball League teams

== Standings ==
| Rank | Team | W | L | W-L% | GB |
|---|---|---|---|---|---|
| 1 | Rockford Peaches | 67 | 44 | .604 | — |
| 2 | Fort Wayne Daisies | 62 | 43 | .590 | 2 |
| 3 | Kenosha Comets | 63 | 46 | .578 | 3 |
| 4 | Grand Rapids Chicks | 59 | 53 | .527 | 8½ |
| 5 | South Bend Blue Sox | 55 | 55 | .500 | 11½ |
| 6 | Racine Belles | 50 | 59 | .459 | 16 |
| 7 | Peoria Redwings | 44 | 63 | .411 | 21 |
| 8 | Kalamazoo Lassies | 36 | 73 | .330 | 30 |

== Postseason ==
First round Best of five series
1 | Rockford Peaches | 3
3 | Kenosha Comets | 1
2 | Fort Wayne Daisies | 3
4 | Grand Rapids Chicks | 1

Second round Best of seven series
1 | Rockford Peaches | 4
2 | Fort Wayne Daisies | 3

== Batting statistics ==
| Statistic | Player | Record |
|---|---|---|
| Batting average | Betty Foss; Dorothy Kamenshek (ROC); Evelyn Wawryshyn (FW); Sophie Kurys (RAC); Doris Sams (KAL); Betty Wagoner (SB); Inez Voyce (GR); Alice Pollitt (ROC); Doris Satterfield (GR); Dorothy Harrell (ROC); Wilma Briggs (FW); Rose Gacioch (GR) | .346.334.311.307.301.296.292.279.278.276.275.263 |
| Runs scored | Sophie Kurys (RAC); Thelma Eisen (FW); Marilyn Olinger (GR); Charlene Pryer (SB); Evelyn Wawryshyn (FW); Wilma Briggs (FW); Doris Satterfield (GR); Betty Foss (FW); Dorothy Kamenshek (ROC); Edythe Perlick (RAC) | 95; 87; 78; 75; 71; 69; 68; 64; 64; 64 |
| Hits | Sophie Kurys (RAC); Betty Foss (FW); Evelyn Wawryshyn (FW); Doris Satterfield (GR); Dorothy Harrell (ROC); Charlene Pryer (SB); Betty Wagoner (SB); Dorothy Kamenshek (ROC); Inez Voyce (GR); Wilma Briggs (FW) | 130; 125; 124; 120; 119; 115; 115; 114; 111; 109 |
| Doubles | Betty Foss (FW); Sophie Kurys (RAC); Thelma Eisen (FW); Betty Luna (FW/KAL); Dorothy Harrell (ROC); Lavonne Paire (GR); Doris Satterfield (GR); Dorothy Schroeder (FW); Doris Sams (KAL); Betty Whiting (SB/KAL) | 24; 22; 20; 18; 16; 16; 16; 15; 15; 15 |
| Triples | Eleanor Callow (ROC); Dorothy Harrell (ROC); Doris Satterfield (GR); Delores Brumfield (KEN); Alice Pollitt (ROC); Edythe Perlick (RAC); Madeline English (RAC); Helen Filarski (SB); Sophie Kurys (RAC); Ruth Richard (ROC) | 11; 10; 8; 7; 7; 7; 6; 6; 6; 6 |
| Home runs | Eleanor Callow (ROC); Sophie Kurys (RAC); Betty Foss (FW); Dorothy Schroeder (FW); Madeline English (RAC); Doris Sams (KAL); Doris Satterfield (GR); June Peppas (RAC); Wilma Briggs (FW); Dorothy Harrell (ROC); Vivian Kellogg (FW); Edythe Perlick (RAC); Marjorie Pieper (KEN/PEO); Inez Voyce (GR) | 7; 7; 5; 5; 4; 4; 4; 4; 3; 3; 3; 3; 3; 3 |
| Runs batted in | Lavonne Paire (GR); Inez Voyce (GR); Dorothy Harrell (ROC); Betty Foss (FW); Edythe Perlick (RAC); Dorothy Schroeder (FW); Eleanor Callow (ROC); Doris Satterfield (GR); June Peppas (RAC); Josephine Lenard (KEN); Evelyn Wawryshyn (FW); Sophie Kurys (RAC); Madeline English (RAC) | 70; 66; 63; 61; 59; 58; 56; 54; 52; 51; 50; 42; 41 |
| Stolen bases | Sophie Kurys (RAC); Thelma Eisen (FW); Charlene Pryer (SB); Senaida Wirth (SB); Evelyn Wawryshyn (FW); Betty Foss (FW); Eilaine Roth (KAL); Madeline English (RAC); Josephine Lenard (KEN); Betty Trezza (RAC) | 120; 75; 75; 67; 65; 64; 64; 61; 53; 53 |
| Total bases | Sophie Kurys (RAC); Dorothy Harrell (ROC); Doris Satterfield (GR); Betty Foss (FW); Eleanor Callow (ROC); Inez Voyce (GR); Evelyn Wawryshyn (FW); Delores Brumfield (KEN); June Peppas (RAC); Dorothy Kamenshek; Edythe Perlick; Betty Wagoner (SB); Thelma Eisen (FW) | 185; 164; 164; 162; 160; 144; 144; 139; 139; 134; 134; 132; 129 |

== Pitching statistics ==
| Statistic | Player | Record |
|---|---|---|
| Wins | Maxine Kline (FW); Jean Faut (SB); Lois Florreich (ROC); Alma Ziegler (GR); Jean Cione (KEN); Eleanor Dapkus (RAC); Louise Erickson (ROC); Dorothy Mueller (SB); Ruby Stephens (KEN); Margaret Holgerson (GR/MUS); Helen Nicol (ROC); Earlene Risinger (GR) | 23; 21; 20; 19; 18; 17; 16; 16; 15; 14; 14; 14 |
| Winning percentage | Alma Ziegler (GR); Maxine Kline (FW); Lois Florreich (ROC); Jean Faut (SB); Jean Cione (KEN); Mildred Deegan (FW); Dorothy Mueller (PEO); Ruby Stephens (KEN); Dorothy Wiltse (FW); Louise Erickson (ROC); Eleanor Dapkus (RAC) | .731.719.714.700.643.640.640.625.619.615.607 |
| Earned run average | Jean Faut (SB); Lois Florreich (ROC); Alma Ziegler (GR); Eleanor Dapkus (RAC); Helen Nicol (ROC); Margaret Holgerson (GR/MUS); Mildred Deegan (FW); Kay Blumetta (FW); Nancy Warren (PEO); Earlene Risinger (GR) | 1.12; 1.18; 1.38; 1.81; 1.98; 2.00; 2.17; 2.33; 2.37; 2.38 |
| Strikeouts | Lois Florreich (ROC); Jean Faut (SB); Eleanor Dapkus (RAC); Doris Sams (KAL); Mary Reynolds (PEO); Margaret Holgerson (GR/MUS); Earlene Risinger (GR); Dorothy Mueller (SB); Louise Erickson (ROC); Maxine Kline (FW) | 171; 118; 112; 109; 106; 101; 90; 90; 88; 87 |
| Complete games | Jean Faut (SB); Lois Florreich (ROC); Jean Cione (KEN); Mildred Deegan (FW); Alma Ziegler (GR); Louise Erickson (ROC); Doris Sams (KAL); Dorothy Mueller (SB) | 29; 28; 25; 24; 24; 23; 22; 22 |
| Games pitched | Jean Faut (SB); Alma Ziegler (GR); Margaret Holgerson (GR/MUS); Maxine Kline (FW); Mary Reynolds (PEO); Jean Cione (KEN); Lois Florreich (ROC); Josephine Hasham (PEO); Nancy Warren (PEO); Eleanor Dapkus (RAC); Earlene Risinger (GR); Mirtha Marrero (KAL); Joanne Winter (RAC) | 36; 35; 33; 33; 33; 32; 32; 32; 32; 31; 31; 30; 30 |
| Innings pitched | Jean Faut (SB); Maxine Kline (FW); Lois Florreich (ROC); Jean Cione (KEN); Alma Ziegler (GR); Earlene Risinger (GR); Margaret Holgerson (GR/MUS); Eleanor Dapkus (RAC); Nancy Warren (PEO); Josephine Hasham (PEO); Mary Reynolds (PEO); Louise Erickson (ROC); Dorothy Mueller (SB); Mildred Deegan (FW) | 290; 266; 252; 243; 235; 231; 230; 229; 228; 226; 221; 221; 221; 220 |

== See also ==
- 1950 Major League Baseball season
- 1950 Nippon Professional Baseball season
