= List of All-American Girls Professional Baseball League fielding records =

This is a list of All-American Girls Professional Baseball League players who posted the best fielding averages in the history of the circuit.

The career fielding records are based on players who appeared in a minimum of six seasons. The regular season fielding records are based on pitchers throwing in at least 20 games and position players appearing in at least 50 games.

== Career records ==
Position	Player	Record	Seasons
Pitcher	Maxine Kline	.972	1948-1954
Catcher	Ruth Lessing	.973	1944-1949
First base	Margaret Danhauser; Dorothy Kamenshek; Betty Whiting	.982	1943-1950; 1943–1951, 1953; 1944-1952
Second base	Sophie Kurys	.957	1943-1952
Third base	Fern Shollenberger	.942	1946-1954
Shortstop	Lavonne Paire	.945	1944-1953
Outfield	Doris Satterfield	.971	1947-1954

== Single season records ==
Position	Player	Record	Season
Pitcher	Lillian Faralla; Maxine Kline; Jean Marlowe; Mary Reynolds; Elaine Roth; Nancy Warren	1.000	1951; 1953; 1952; 1950; 1953; 1954
Catcher	Mary Rountree	.986	1952
First base	Dorothy Kamenshek	.995	1949
Second base	Sophie Kurys	.973	1946
Third base	Ernestine Petras	.965	1952
Shortstop	Alva Jo Fischer	.972	1949
Outfield	Betty Wagoner	1.000	1948

== Sources ==
- All-American Girls Professional Baseball League Record Book – W. C. Madden. Publisher: McFarland & Company, 2000. Format: Softcover, 294pp. Language: English. ISBN 978-0-7864-3747-4

== See also ==
- All-American Girls Professional Baseball League batting records
- All-American Girls Professional Baseball League pitching records
