= Josephine Hasham =

- Pitcher
- Born: November 10, 1924; Brockton, Massachusetts, U.S.
- Died: October 15, 2008 (aged 83); Miami, Florida, U.S.
- Batted: Right Threw: Left

Teams
- Muskegon Lassies (1948); Peoria Redwings (1948, 1950–1951); South Bend Blue Sox (1949); Battle Creek Belles (1952); Muskegon Belles (1953); Rockford Peaches (1954); Grand Rapids Chicks (1954)

Josephine "Feena” Hasham (November 10, 1924 – October 15, 2008) was an American pitcher who played from 1948 through 1954 in the All-American Girls Professional Baseball League (AAGPBL). Hasham batted right-handed and threw left-handed.

A native of Brockton, Massachusetts, Hasham spent seven years in the AAGPBL, pitching in 179 games while collecting a 3.15 career earned run average. She never once played for a pennant-winning team, which is one reason for her losing record of 58–88. Eventually, she played at outfield and was used in pinch-hitting duties to take advantage of her sturdy bat.

Hasham debuted in 1948, but did not win a game while dividing her playing time between the Muskegon Lassies and the Peoria Redwings. She posted a solid 2.14 ERA in 63 innings pitched, though she finished with a 0–6 record in ten games.

Hasham joined the South Bend Blue Sox in 1949, when she enjoyed her best career season. She earned the respect of Blue Sox manager Dave Bancroft, who included her in a pitching staff headed by Jean Faut, Ruth Williams, Lillian Faralla and Louise Arnold. Hasham collected a 12–8 record and a 2.02 ERA in 23 decisions, probably inspired by her pitching teammates and a strong offensive support from Elizabeth Mahon, Betty Whiting, Senaida Wirth, Betty Wagoner and Rita Briggs. South Bend tied the Rockford Peaches for first place with a record of 75–36. Both teams played later a best-of-seven-series, which Rockford swept.

But Hasham suffered a nightmare career after she came back to Peoria. In 1950 she went 8–19 with a 3.38 ERA while leading the league in losses. She improved in 1951, after going 13–15 with a 3.10 ERA. She pitched much better for the hapless Battle Creek Belles in 1952, leading her team with a 12–14 mark and a 2.51 ERA, while ranking third in the league for the most innings pitched (222) behind Racine Belles' Rose Gacioch (259) and Fort Wayne Daisies' Maxine Kline (238). She also contributed as a hitter, going 35-for-158 for a .222 average in 81 games, driving in 21 runs and scoring six times. Meanwhile, the Belles finished last with a 43–67 record, 24 games behind first place Fort Wayne.

In 1953, Hasham had an 8–19 record with a .371 ERA for the last-place Muskegon Belles, who ended with a 39–70 mark, 39½ games out of contention. For the second time she led the league in losses, but helped herself with the bat by hitting a .241 average (27-for-62) with one home run and 13 RBI in 62 games.

Hasham was used sparingly by the Grand Rapids Chicks in 1954, during what turned out to be the AAGPBL final season. She played mainly as an outfielder, even though she often pitched in relief when needed. As a hitter, she posted a .349 average (15-for-43) with three homers and nine RBI in 37 games, and also had a 5–7 record with a 7.05 ERA while pitching in 20 games.

Hasham, along with her former teammates and opponents, received their long overdue recognition when the Baseball Hall of Fame and Museum dedicated a permanent display to the All-American Girls Professional Baseball League in 1988. After retiring, she moved to Miami, Florida.

== Career statistics ==
Pitching

GP	W	L	W-L%	ERA	IP	H	RA	ER	BB	SO	HBP	WP	WHIP	SO/BB
179	58	88	.397	3.15	1164	1126	575	407	440	270	7	51	1.345	0.61

Batting

GP	AB	R	H	2B	3B	HR	RBI	SB	TB	BB	SO	BA	OBP	SLG	OPS
331	629	29	133	12	0	4	67	3	157	51	42	.211	.271	.250	.520

Fielding

PO	A	E	TC	FA
82	357	28	467	.940

== See also ==
- All-American Girls Professional Baseball League pitching records
