= Marie Mansfield =

American baseball player (1931–2024)

- Pitcher
- Born: November 4, 1931; Jamaica Plain, Massachusetts, U.S.
- Died: January 28, 2024 (aged 92); Lowell, Massachusetts, U.S.
- Batted: Right Threw: Right

debut
- 1950

Last appearance
- 1954

Teams
- Rockford Peaches (1950–1952[end], 1953–1954); Battle Creek Belles (1952[start])

Career highlights and awards
- Championship team (1950); Two playoff appearances (1951–1952); Single-season leader in strikeouts (1953); Women in Baseball – AAGPBL Permanent Display at Baseball Hall of Fame and Museum (1988)

Marie Mansfield (later Kelley, November 4, 1931 – January 28, 2024) was an American pitcher who played from 1950 through 1954 in the All-American Girls Professional Baseball League (AAGPBL). Listed at 5 ft 7 in (1.70 m), 140 lb., she batted and threw right-handed.

Born in Jamaica Plain, Massachusetts, Mansfield began playing softball at age 12. She entered the All-American Girls Professional Baseball League in 1950 with the Rockford Peaches, playing for them as a fourth outfielder and at first base. Guided by her manager Bill Allington, she showed promise on the pitcher's mound with her fluid overhand delivery, which the league had converted in 1946. Allington did not hesitate to include her in the Peaches pitching staff.

In 1951, Mansfield teamed up with Rose Gacioch and Helen Fox to give Rockford a strong one-two-three punch pitching combination in the eight-team circuit. She collected a 16–8 record and a 2.85 earned run average in 30 games, ending fifth in wins, eighth in innings pitched (202), and third in strikeouts (121) behind Jean Faut of the South Bend Blue Sox (135) and Margaret Holgerson of the Grand Rapids Chicks (123). In addition, Gacioch finished 20–7 and Fox went 18–7 to assure a berth in the postseason. In the first round of the best-of-three series, Rockford swept the favored Chicks backed by victories from Fox and Mansfield and the bats of Eleanor Callow and Dorothy Kamenshek. The Peaches won the first two games of the final best-of-five series, but South Bend claimed the championship by winning them three games in a row.

Mansfield moved to the ill-fated Battle Creek Belles in 1952, as the AAGPBL shifted players as needed to help some teams stay afloat. Nevertheless, she rejoined the Peaches late in the year in time to help the team in the playoffs. She dropped for a combined 3–14 record in the regular season, while Rockford advanced to the finals after sweeping the Fort Wayne Daisies in two games. The 1952 championship series was a repeat of the previous year with the Peaches again facing the Blue Sox. This time Rockford lost to South Bend, three to two games. Faut was the winning pitcher in the decisive Game 5, hitting two triples and driving in two runs while turning in a 6–3 complete game performance.

In 1953, Mansfield went 10–12 with 143 strikeouts and a 2.82 ERA, tying with Faut for the most strikeouts in the season. Fourth place Rockford faced second place Grand Rapids in the first round of the best-of-three series. Rockford was the winner in Game 1 by a 9–2 score, but Earlene Risinger pitched a 2–0 shutout to lead the Chicks in Game 2, while Dorothy Mueller held off the Peaches on eight hits in the final game, to send Grand Rapids into the finals.

Mansfield had a 5–8 record in 1954, finishing seventh in ERA (3.27) and ninth in strikeouts, during what turned out to be the league's final season. With five teams in the circuit, the only team not to make it to the postseason was the last place Rockford Peaches.

In a five-season career, Mansfield collected a 34–42 record and a 3.33 ERA in 92 pitching appearances. She went 1–2 in three postseason games, even though she posted a solid 0.86 ERA in 21 innings of work.

Following her baseball career Mansfield returned to her homeland of Jamaica Plain and worked as a keypunch operator at a number of firms. After retiring, she became an active collaborator of the AAGPBL Players Association. With former AAGPBL pitcher June Peppas at the helm, the association was largely responsible for the opening of a permanent display at the Baseball Hall of Fame and Museum in Cooperstown, New York, which was unveiled in 1988 to honor the entire All-American Girls Professional Baseball League.

Mansfield died in Lowell, Massachusetts, on January 28, 2024, at the age of 92.

== Career statistics ==
Pitching

| GP | W | L | W-L% | ERA | IP | H | RA | ER | BB | SO |
|---|---|---|---|---|---|---|---|---|---|---|
| 92 | 34 | 42 | .447 | 3.33 | 611 | 424 | 321 | 226 | 505 | 369 |

Batting

| GP | AB | R | H | 2B | 3B | HR | RBI | SB | BB | SO | BA | OBP |
|---|---|---|---|---|---|---|---|---|---|---|---|---|
| 153 | 623 | 54 | 91 | 10 | 1 | 0 | 38 | 16 | 69 | 140 | .146 | .231 |

Fielding

| GP | PO | A | E | TC | DP | FA |
|---|---|---|---|---|---|---|
| 123 | 243 | 21 | 10 | 283 | 9 | .961 |
