= Delores Brumfield =

American baseball player (1932–2020)

- Infield/outfield utility
- Born: May 26, 1932; Prichard, Alabama, U.S.
- Died: May 29, 2020 (aged 88); Prescott, Arkansas, U.S.
- Batted: Right Threw: Right

Teams
- South Bend Blue Sox (1947); Kenosha Comets (1948–1951); Fort Wayne Daisies (1952, 1953)

Career highlights and awards
- Four postseason appearances (1948–1950, 1953); Led all position players in fielding average (1950); Women in Baseball – AAGPBL Permanent Display at Baseball Hall of Fame and Museum (1988)

Delores Brumfield [White] (May 26, 1932 – May 29, 2020) was an American baseball player. White played as a utility infielder/outfielder from 1947 through 1953 in the All-American Girls Professional Baseball League (AAGPBL). Listed at 5 ft 6 in (1.68 m), 125 lb., she batted and threw right-handed.

In 1947 Delores Brumfield became one of the youngest players to join the All-American Girls Professional Baseball League at the age of 14. Throughout much of her career, Brumfield exhibited a versatility to play most positions with the exception of pitcher and catcher. Among other career highlights, she posted the best fielding average for all position players in 1950 and finished second in the batting title race in 1953. Following her baseball retirement, she earned a master's degree and doctorate in physical education and worked as a teacher and coach for 40 years.

== Early life ==
Born in Prichard, Alabama, Delores was the oldest of three children into the family of Earl Henry and Miriam McKay (née Turner) Brumfield. Her father was an auto mechanic, while her mother stayed at home until World War II, when she started as an office worker before becoming an office manager for an insurance firm.

At an early age Brumfield learned to play sandlot ball with other neighborhood kids, trying out for the league in 1946 when she turned 13. After failing to make the grade, she joined a softball team made up of girls from the Brookley Field area military base in Mobile. She received an invitation the next year to attend the AAGPBL spring training in Havana, Cuba. Her parents did not like the idea, but they agreed after a league's player, Margaret Holgerson, offered to serve as a chaperone for their daughter during the trip.

== Professional career ==
At 15, Brumfield entered the league in 1947 with the South Bend Blue Sox, a squad managed by Chet Grant, a former Notre Dame football player and the sports editor for the South Bend Tribune. She obtained her nickname ״Dolly״ that season, and it stuck with her for the rest of her career. Grant worked hard with Brumfield, spending significant amount of time teaching and encouraging her. When he moved to the Kenosha Comets the following season, he selected her from the player pool. I attribute a lot of my success in the league to Chet, she explained in an interview.

Brumfield had a .117 batting average in her rookie season and .142 as a sophomore. She raised her average to .212 in 1949, while playing for new manager Johnny Gottselig. She also improved in other areas, dropping her strikeouts to only 26 in 274 at bats (one in each 10.54 AB), while raising her on-base percentage from .225 to .289 and her slugging from .153 to .248.

Her most productive season came in 1950, when she posted career numbers in games played (108), hits (108), runs (58), runs batted in (37), doubles (14), triples (7) and stolen bases (37). She also ranked seventh for the most total bases (139) and tied for fourth in triples, averaging a .336 on base percentage and a .332 slugging average. For the second consecutive year, she improved her batting average more than 50 points, hitting .264, while striking out only once every 17.78 at bats, another career best. In addition, she shone at first base, committing only 15 errors in 1259 chances for a .988 fielding average, for the best mark among position players.

In 1951 Brumfield batted a team-high .273 average and tied for ninth in the league in doubles (14). She was traded to the Fort Wayne Daisies in 1952, appearing mostly at second base, but struggled until the manager Jimmie Foxx put her at first base for a double header. She went six-for-eight, including a home run, which prompted Foxx to use her at first in a regular basis. Unfortunately, near the end of the season she broke her left ankle in a home-plate collision and lost the rest of the season and the playoffs.

During her last season of play, in 1953, Brumfield batted .332 to finish second behind teammate Joanne Weaver (.346), while surpassing another teammate, Betty Foss (.321), and Rockford Peaches' Alice Deschaine (.315). Fort Wayne, with Bill Allington at the helm, clinched the regular season title but lost to the Kalamazoo Lassies in the best-of-three first round. Despite her successful year, Brumfield suffered a prolonged case of anemia during the regular season and decided to concentrate in her college education. Playing in the league allowed me to pay for my college education, she claimed.

== Personal life and legacy ==
Brumfield had been attending college during the offseason. She graduated from Alabama College for Women (1954) with a degree in health, physical education and recreation. She then attended the University of Southern Mississippi, receiving her master's degree (1959) and doctorate (1969) in physical education. In 1977 she married Joe White, from Gurdon, Arkansas, becoming known as Dr. Delores ״Dee״ White. She took up teaching at Henderson State University and retired in 1994 after 40 years of dedicated work, being honored with the title professor emeritus.

In 1988, she became part of Women in Baseball, a permanent display based at the Baseball Hall of Fame and Museum in Cooperstown, New York, which was unveiled to honor the entire All-American Girls Professional Baseball League. She later served as president of the AAGPBL Players Association for a long term.

Besides this, her work and legacy also have been recognized by a number of individuals and organizations. She gained induction into the Henderson's Reddie Hall of Honor in 1998. In 2003, she was invited to the White House by President George W. Bush to serve as a first base coach for one of the South Lawn tee ball games hosted by the president. In 2004, she was honored by the University of Montevallo with one of its Distinguished Alumni Awards. Then, in 2007 she was recognized by seeing the Henderson State University softball field renamed as the “Dr. Delores ‘Dolly’ Brumfield-White Softball Field” in a dedication ceremony. She has even been honored with a painting of her adorning a traffic control box in North Little Rock, Arkansas, just a short distance from Dickey-Stephens Park, the home of the Texas League's Arkansas Travelers.

She died on May 29, 2020, in Prescott, Arkansas, at the age of 88.

== Career statistics ==
Batting

GP	AB	R	H	2B	3B	HR	RBI	SB	TB	BB	SO	BA	OBP	SLG
533	1767	215	408	61	17	4	160	107	515	247	176	.231	.325	.291

Fielding

GP	PO	A	E	TC	DP	FA
498	3841	453	95	4389	193	.978
