= Frances Janssen =

American baseball player

- Pitcher
- Born: January 26, 1926; Remington, Indiana, U.S.
- Died: November 27, 2008 (aged 82); Lafayette, Indiana, U.S.
- Batted: Right Threw: Right

Teams
- South Bend Blue Sox (1948[start]); Grand Rapids Chicks (1948[end]); Chicago Colleens (1949); Peoria Redwings (1950[start], 1951[mid]); Kalamazoo Lassies (1950[mid], 1951[mid]); Fort Wayne Daisies (1950[end], 1951[start]); Battle Creek Belles (1951[end], 1952)

Career highlights and awards
- Postseason appearance (1950); Women in Baseball – AAGPBL Permanent Display at Baseball Hall of Fame and Museum (1988)

Frances L. Janssen (January 25, 1926 – November 27, 2008), also known as "Big Red" or "Little Red", was an American pitcher who played from 1948 through 1952 in the All-American Girls Professional Baseball League (AAGPBL). Listed at 5 ft 11 in (1.80 m), 155 lb, she batted and threw right-handed.

She was a well-traveled pitcher during her five-year career in the AAGPBL, as she moved constantly from one city to another because the league office shifted players to help teams stay competitive. Janssen also was cut twice from the league, but kept playing for seven different teams.

Born in Remington, Indiana, Frances was the daughter of Fred and Anna (née Petersen) Janssen, who emigrated from Germany in the mid-1910s and settled in the farmlands of Indiana. She had a brother, Paul, and four sisters, Betty, Tinie, Wilma and Anna. Almost six feet tall, Frances played basketball and organized softball while attending Gilboa High School. She later received an associate degree in business from South Bend IUPUI and attended the International Business College of Fort Wayne. She graduated in 1944 and immediately went to work in an office.

== Baseball Career ==
By the time, several girls from her local softball team had been scouted and signed by the league; Janssen went to a tryout in 1946 but was not signed. At a second tryout in 1948, she was accepted and assigned to the South Bend Blue Sox for a couple of days before being sent to the Grand Rapids Chicks. Janssen had a 4–4 record with a 3.98 earned run average in 11 games and was released after one month of action. According to Janssen, she was released because she "couldn't throw a curveball".

=== Chicago Colleens ===
Janssen accepted a demotion to the Chicago Colleens/Springfield Sallies rookie touring teams after being released. The Colleens and the Sallies had lost their franchises after their poor performance the previous year; both teams played exhibition games against each other as they travelled through 20 states primarily in the South and East and played in 46 cities.

In two of those games, Janssen was asked to switch to the Sallies and serve as playing manager as well as chaperone. She also led her Colleens team in pitching and had two one-hitter shutouts against Springfield at ballparks in Oklahoma and South Carolina. Janssen finished the tour with a 16–6 record in 23 pitching appearances, which were not recorded in official statistics by the league due to the tour's nature as exhibition games.

=== 1950: Peoria Redwings and Fort Wayne Daisies ===
Janssen was promoted to the Peoria Redwings in 1950 and pitched for the Fort Wayne Daisies in the postseason. She went 3–3 with a 3.87 ERA in 19 games for Peoria and Fort Wayne, and pitched 12 innings of shutout ball without a decision in three playoff games as the Daisies lost to the Rockford Peaches in the best-of-seven final round.

=== 1951: Fort Wayne, Peoira, Kalamazoo Lassies and Battle Creek Belles ===
She opened the 1951 season with Fort Wayne and returned to Peoria early in the year. Janssen was then sent to the Kalamazoo Lassies during the midseason and finished the year with the Battle Creek Belles. Through the season, Janssen posted a career-best 26 games pitched, only six behind Belles teammate Migdalia Pérez, while also setting career-highs in ERA (2.67), innings pitched (145) and strikeouts (43). Despite her performance, the team finished with a 6–10 losing record.

=== 1952: Battle Creek Belles ===
Janssen spent the entire 1952 season with Battle Creek and was used in relief duties, a seldom used role in the league. She appeared in only five games, going 0–1 with a 5.00 ERA in 18 innings.

== Post Baseball Career ==
After retiring from baseball, Janssen played center for the South Bend Rockettes women's basketball team and volleyball with the South Bend Turners for more than a decade. She helped the Rockettes win five national championships and won a national champion title with the Turners. Janssen was also an avid golfer and attended AAGPBL Players Association reunions. She also was an insurance representative for the Laven Insurance Company in South Bend for 25 years and retired in 1991. Janssen was an assistant researcher for AAGPBL archives at the Northern Indiana Historical Society, of which she was an active member. The association was largely responsible for the opening of Women in Baseball, a permanent display at the Baseball Hall of Fame and Museum in Cooperstown, New York, which was unveiled in 1988 to honor the entire All-American Girls Professional Baseball League. After moving from her native Remington to South Bend, she lived in Lafayette, where she died of natural causes in 2008 at the age of 82.

== Career statistics ==
Pitching

GP	W	L	W-L%	ERA	IP	H	RA	ER	BB	SO	HBP	WP	WHIP
61	13	18	.419	3.74	289	283	178	120	143	67	13	11	1.47

Batting

GP	AB	R	H	2B	3B	HR	RBI	SB	BB	SO	BA	OBP
61	105	6	17	3	0	0	5	0	7	18	.162	.229

Fielding

GP	PO	A	E	TC	DP	FA
61	7	129	4	140	1	.938
