= Louise Erickson (baseball) =

- Pitcher
- Born: June 2, 1929; Arcadia, Wisconsin, U.S.
- Died: May 27, 2016 (aged 86); Whitehall, Wisconsin, U.S.
- Batted: Right Threw: Right

Teams
- Racine Belles (1948); Rockford Peaches (1949–1950)

Career highlights and awards
- Two-time All-Star Team (1949–1950); Two Championship Teams (1949–1950); Women in Baseball – AAGPBL Permanent Display Baseball Hall of Fame and Museum (1988)

Louise Erickson [Sauer] (June 2, 1929 – May 27, 2016) was an American pitcher who played from 1948 through 1950 in the All-American Girls Professional Baseball League (AAGPBL). Listed at 5 ft 9 in (1.75 m), 162 lb. (73 kg), she batted and threw right-handed. She was nicknamed Lou by her teammates.

Erickson had a brief but fruitful career as a member of the AAGPBL. In a three-year stint, she was a member of two champion teams and landed on the All-Star team two times. While showing an array of pitches and not being prone to walks, she relied on a fastball, curveball and changeup combination, mixing speeds in her curve sparingly, with an impeccable control over location.

Born in Arcadia, Wisconsin, Erickson used to play baseball with her father, uncles and five brothers at an early age. I had no previous formal or informal training in softball or baseball. Two of my uncles played weekend baseball and I was the tomboy shagging balls in the outfield, she recalled in an interview.

Afterward she was allowed to shag balls for a neighboring town team, which drew the attention of the manager, who recommended her to the league. She was invited to a tryout and immediately was assigned to the Racine Belles in the 1948 season, which was already underway. She was used in relief duties and collected a 1–0 record with a 5.74 earned run average and 11 innings of work in three appearances.

Erickson opened 1949 with the Rockford Peaches. She was added to the pitching rotation, becoming the third starter on an excellent staff behind Lois Florreich and Helen Fox. Erickson responded to more mound time with a 17–6 record and a 1.76 ERA in 216 innings, including seven shutouts, while ranking fourth in the league in wins and winning percentage (.739), gaining selection to the All-Star team.

Meanwhile, the Peaches played a best-of-seven series with the South Bend Blue Sox, which Rockford swept, with Erickson defeating Jean Faut and South Bend in a two-hit, 1–0 shutout in Game 4. Then, the Grand Rapids Chicks and Rockford hooked up for a best-of-five series to determine the league championship, which was won by Rockford in four contests. In Game 3, Erickson beat Mildred Earp and Grand Rapids by a 5–2 score.

In the 1950 season Erickson went 16–10 with a 2.52 ERA, ending sixth in complete games (23), ninth in strikeouts (88) and eleventh in innings pitched (221), tying South Bend's Dorothy Mueller for seventh in wins, and also joined the All-Star team for the second consecutive year. She contributed at the plate as well, going 21-for-88 for a .239 batting average, more than three of the Rockford starting position players.

In the best-of-five first round, Rockford eliminated the Kenosha Comets in four games, with Erickson winning Game 3 while limiting Kenosha to four hits in an 8–3 victory. In the final series Rockford claimed its second title in a row, four games to three, over the Fort Wayne Daisies. In Game 2, Erickson limited the Daisies to five hits in a 5–2 victory, but lost a pitching duel against Maxine Kline in Game 6. Rockford wound up winning last game thanks to a 3–1 pitching performance by her teammate Fox. It would be the last season for Erickson. Overall, she posted a 34–16 record with a 2.13 ERA in three seasons, while going 4–1 with a 2.60 ERA in five playoff appearances.

Erickson retired from baseball for personal reasons. Everything was great, except the bus rides to the four state destinations. I could never sleep on the bus, so those trips got boring after a 126 game schedule – all night games, she explained.

Lou married Burton Sauer in 1950 and became a housewife. Her husband was a postmaster and they produced a daughter and a son and two grandsons. In addition, she coached girls' softball in her hometown of Arcadia, Wisconsin.

Lou Erickson is part of Women in Baseball, a permanent display based at the Baseball Hall of Fame and Museum in Cooperstown, New York, which was unveiled in 1988 to honor the entire All-American Girls Professional Baseball League rather than any individual personality.

== Pitching statistics ==
GP	W	L	W-L%	ERA	IP	H	RA	ER	BB	SO	WHIP	H/9	BB/9	K/9
55	34	16	.680	2.13	448	343	133	106	122	130	1.04	6.89	2.45	2.61
