= Senaida Wirth =

American baseball player (1926–1967)

- Shortstop
- Born: October 4, 1926; Tampa, Florida, U.S.
- Died: May 20, 1967 (aged 40)
- Batted: Right Threw: Right
- Stats at Baseball Reference

Teams
- South Bend Blue Sox (1945–1951)

Career highlights and awards
- All-Star Team (1946); Championship Team (1951)

Senaida Wirth [Shu-Shu] (October 4, 1926 – May 20, 1967) was a shortstop who played in the All-American Girls Professional Baseball League (AAGPBL). Listed at 5 ft 0 in (1.52 m), 114 lb., Wirth batted and threw right-handed. She was born in Tampa, Florida.

Senaida Wirth was a fine defensive shortstop with good range on the field and a strong throwing arm. Basically a line drive hitter, Wirth did not have any real power, but she was an accomplished bunter that put the ball in play and was extremely hard to strike out, averaging one strikeout per every 7.55 at bats (160-for-2120) while collecting a solid 1.96 walk-to-strikeout ratio (313-to-160). She also was respected for her swiftness in stealing bases, because once she reached base she was almost unstoppable, collecting 352 stolen bases in her seven-year career. A member of a champion team, she earned one spot in the 1946 All-Star Team.

Wirth entered the AAGPBL in 1945 with the South Bend Blue Sox, playing for them through the 1951 season as a replacement for departed shortstop Dottie Schroeder. She joined a talented team, managed by Marty McManus, that included players as pitching star Jean Faut, one of the most dominant hurlers of the league, as well as Bonnie Baker, Betsy Jochum, Phyllis Koehn, Elizabeth Mahon and Inez Voyce, whom could be counted on for their bats and solid defense. Wirth had a promising debut, leading the league hitters with a .386 average at a point of the season. She faded after that, ending with a .249 mark. The Blue Sox finished fifth of six teams with a 49–60 record.

In her sophomore season, Wirth was selected by the AAGPBL managers for the 1946 All-Star Team as a rookie. She hit a .245 average in 107 games, including 65 runs with 91 hits and 22 RBI, while stealing 89 bases. The Blue Sox improved to 70–42 and advanced to the playoffs, but were defeated by the Racine Belles in the first round.

Wirth saw limited action in 1947. Though she lost more than 30 games due to an injury, she was able to hit .227 and score 35 runs in 73 games. For the second consecutive year, South Bend reached the playoffs after going 57–54, but the club lost to the Grand Rapids Chicks in their first round of post-season action.

Wirth increased her average to .241 in 1948, appearing in a career-high 113 games while scoring 60 runs with 26 RBI. Her batting average was remarkable, considering that it was a season dominated by strong pitching. At this point, Alice Haylett led the league with a 25–5 record and a 0.77 earned run average, while Joanne Winter finished 25–12 with a league-lead 248 strikeouts. Audrey Wagner, who won the batting title with a .312 average, became the only girl to hit over .300, ending 23 points ahead of runner-up Connie Wisniewski. Meanwhile, the Blue Sox ended 57–69 and made the playoff but again were defeated by the Chicks in the first round.

Wirth matched her own record of 113 games in 1949, ending with a .229 average, 89 hits, 62 runs and 40 RBI. That year the Blue Sox were swept in the final series by the Rockford Peaches, 4 to 0, after getting a first-round bye (75-36, along with the Peaches). In 1950, she appeared in 105 games and bolstered her average to .268, including 61 runs, 49 RBI, and a career-high 103 hits. With Dave Bancroft at the helm, South Bend earned a fifth place with a 55–55 mark.

In 1951 Wirth enjoyed her most productive year in her final season of play, when she posted career-numbers with a .274 average and 77 runs scored in 105 games while driving in 54 runs. Her teammate Jean Faut was 15–7 with a 1.33 ERA and led the league with 135 strikeouts. On July 21 she hurled a perfect game against Rockford, and was named Player of the Year at the end of the season. New manager Karl Winsch guided South Bend to the playoffs with a combined record of 76–36. Finally, Wirth was on a club that advanced to the final series. In round one Faut won two 2–1 decisions against the Fort Wayne Daisies. She later defeated twice the Chicks in the best-of-five series, as South Bend claimed the Championship Title.

In a seven-season career with South Bend, Wirth posted a .248 average with a .345 on-base percentage in 616 games appearances. She is also part of the AAGPBL permanent display at the Baseball Hall of Fame and Museum at Cooperstown, New York, opened in 1988, which is dedicated to the entire league rather than any individual player.

== Statistics ==
Batting

GP	AB	R	H	2B	3B	HR	RBI	SB	BB	SO	BA	OBP	SLG
616	2120	360	526	26	12	2	201	359	313	160	.248	.345	.275

Fielding

PO	A	E	TC	DP	FA
1127	1898	186	3211	124	.943
