= Jacquelyn Kelley =

- Utility Infielder / Outfielder / Pitcher
- Born: November 11, 1926; Lansing, Michigan, U.S.
- Died: May 12, 1988 (aged 61); Lansing, Michigan, U.S.
- Batted: Right Threw: Right

Teams
- South Bend Blue Sox (1947); Chicago Colleens (1948); Peoria Redwings (1949); Rockford Peaches (1949–1953)

Career highlights and awards
- All-Star Team (1950); Championship Team (1950); Five playoff appearances (1949–1953); Women in Baseball – AAGPBL Permanent Display Baseball Hall of Fame and Museum (1988)

Jacquelyn Kelley [née Savage] (November 11, 1926 – May 12, 1988) was an American utility infielder/outfielder and pitcher who played from 1947 through 1953 in the All-American Girls Professional Baseball League (AAGPBL). Listed at 5 ft 7 in (1.70 m), 140 lb., she batted and threw right-handed.

Born in Lansing, Michigan, Jackie Kelley grew up in a household devoted to athletic activity. Notably, all four of her brothers were athletes and her mother was a star basketball player, while Kelley was a talented swimmer in pursuit of a professional career. On one occasion, her swimming skills led to saving two people from drowning. She also enjoyed all sports, particularly baseball, and had a strong interest in flying and photography.

Kelley played in the All-American Girls Professional Baseball League for seven years, being able to play infield, outfield, and pitch.

″Scrounge,″ or ″Babe,″ as Kelley was usually called, was spotted by a AAGPBL scout while she was playing in her hometown. She attended the 1947 AAGPBL spring training held in Havana, Cuba, and made the trip along with her fellow neighbor and long-time friend Alice Pollitt. Kelley was relocated to the South Bend Blue Sox, while Pollitt joined the Rockford Peaches.

Following her rookie season in 1947, Kelley was part of the expansion Chicago Colleens in 1948. She opened 1949 with the Peoria Redwings, but rejoined Pollitt on the Peaches in a moment of the season when the league shifted players as needed to help teams stay afloat. She played with the Peaches through 1953, her last year in the league.

In 1950, Kelley was a member of the Rockford team that won the championship title and was selected to the All-Star team as a backup outfielder. Her most productive season came in 1951, when she posted career-numbers in games played (107), hits (85), extrabases (22), runs batted in (52) and stolen bases (31), while batting a .224 average and a .286 on-base percentage. In 1952 she enjoyed her best year as a pitcher, after going 12–11 with a 2.89 earned run average in 209 innings of work.

After her baseball career was over, Kelley joined the United States Marine Corps and met her husband. Since 1988 she is part of Women in Baseball, a permanent display based at the Baseball Hall of Fame and Museum in Cooperstown, New York, which was unveiled to honor the entire All-American Girls Professional Baseball League rather than individual baseball personalities.

Jacquelyn Kelley died of lung cancer in Lansing, Michigan, at the age of 61.

== Regular season statistics ==
Batting

| GP | AB | R | H | 2B | 3B | HR | RBI | SB | BB | SO | BA | OBP | SLG |
|---|---|---|---|---|---|---|---|---|---|---|---|---|---|
| 426 | 1307 | 112 | 270 | 42 | 18 | 5 | 131 | 70 | 105 | 166 | .207 | .266 | .278 |

Pitching

| GP | W | L | W-L% | ERA | IP | H | RA | ER | BB | SO | WHIP |
|---|---|---|---|---|---|---|---|---|---|---|---|
| 53 | 15 | 18 | .455 | 3.46 | 310 | 259 | 157 | 119 | 216 | 115 | 1.70 |

Collective fielding

| GP | PO | A | E | TC | DP | FA |
|---|---|---|---|---|---|---|
| 356 | 677 | 449 | 105 | 1231 | 42 | .918 |

== Post season statistics ==
Batting

| GP | AB | R | H | 2B | 3B | HR | RBI | SB | BA |
|---|---|---|---|---|---|---|---|---|---|
| 26 | 81 | 8 | 16 | 1 | 1 | 0 | 11 | 3 | .198 |

Pitching

| GP | W | L | W-L% | ERA | IP | H | RA | ER | BB | SO | WHIP |
|---|---|---|---|---|---|---|---|---|---|---|---|
| 3 | 2 | 0 | 1.000 | 5.08 | 16 | 18 | 13 | 9 | 4 | 2 | 1.37 |
