= Shirley Stovroff =

American baseball player

- Catcher
- Born: March 18, 1931; Madison, Illinois, U.S.
- Died: September 16, 1994 (aged 63); Arizona, U.S.
- Batted: right Threw: right

Teams
- Springfield Sallies (1948); South Bend Blue Sox (1948–1952)

Career highlights and awards
- Two-time Championship team (1951–1952)

Shirley "Stovie" Stovroff (March 18, 1931 – September 16, 1994) was a catcher who played from 1948 through 1952 in the All-American Girls Professional Baseball League (AAGPBL). Stovroff batted and threw right-handed. She was born in Madison, Illinois.

Stovroff entered the All-American Girls Professional Baseball League in 1948 with the expansion Springfield Sallies, playing for them part of that season before joining the South Bend Blue Sox for the rest of her career (1948–1952).

Her most productive season came in 1951, when she hit a .266 average in 100 games, including 81 hits, and drove in 54 runs while scoring 37 times. She also was a member of the South Bend teams that clinched the Championship titles in 1951 and 1952.

While catching for the Blue Sox, Stovroff formed a solid battery with talented pitcher Jean Faut, catching two no-hitters and one perfect game for her teammate. She also led the Sox offensive with a .467 average (7-for-15) and three RBI in the 1951 final series.

Stovroff is part of Women in Baseball, the AAGPBL permanent display at the Baseball Hall of Fame and Museum at Cooperstown, New York, which was inaugurated on November 5, 1988 in honor of the entire league rather than individual baseball personalities.

Stovroff died in her homeland of Madison at the age of 63.

== Batting statistics ==
GP	AB	R	H	RBI	BA
455	1306	138	282	143	.216
