= Alice Hohlmayer =

- First base / Pitcher
- Born: January 19, 1925; Springfield, Ohio, U.S.
- Died: March 25, 2017 (aged 92); Bonita, California, U.S.
- Batted: Left Threw: Left

Teams
- Kenosha Comets (1946–1948); Muskegon Lassies (1949); Kalamazoo Lassies (1950); Peoria Redwings (1950–1951)

Career highlights and awards
- Pitched 42 consecutive scoreless innings (1950); Two postseason appearances (1948–1949); Women in Baseball – AAGPBL Permanent Display at the Baseball Hall of Fame and Museum (since 1988)

Alice Hohlmayer (later Naughton; January 19, 1925 – March 25, 2017) was an American first sacker and pitcher who played from 1946 through 1951 in the All-American Girls Professional Baseball League (AAGPBL). Listed at 5' 6" (1.68 m), 160 lb. (73 k), she batted and threw left-handed.

Born in Springfield, Ohio, Alice Hohlmayer was the daughter of Carl Hohlmayer, a milkman and laundromat owner, and Marguerite (née Waggaman) Hohlmayer, a housewife. Alice played softball at age five with her brothers and later served as a batgirl and player for the Finke and Herne club, which toured across Ohio, being selected at first base for the All-Star team in the 1937 State's Tournament. Nicknamed ״Lefty״ from school days, she also played basketball, field hockey, tennis and volleyball.

Hohlmayer graduated from Springfield High School in 1942. The next year she entered Ohio State University, where she had a chance to show her athletic talent. Then, she was discovered by an AAGPBL sport in 1945 while playing during a tournament in Cleveland, and later was contacted by the league's president Max Carey.

Following a tryout at Pascagoula, Mississippi, Hohlmayer entered the league in 1946 with the Kenosha Comets, playing for them three years. She opened at first base, then gradually started to pitch until becoming a full-time pitcher, showing good batting skills and a hard throwing arm. The versatile Hohlmayer hurled 42 consecutive scoreless innings in 1950, and also made 21 putouts at first base in a regular game. Her most productive season came in 1951, when she posted a 15–11 record with a 2.02 earned run average and 209 innings of work in 29 pitching appearances.

In a six-year career, Hohlmayer was a .203 hitter and posted a pitching record of 33–32 with a 2.58 ERA. In seven postseason games, she hit .136 (3-for-22) and had a 1.29 ERA in seven innings without a decision.

Hohlmayer continued studying while playing baseball, graduating in 1949 from Ohio State with bachelor's degrees in physical education and health. After the 1951 season she returned home to help save the family laundromat business. Later she married William McNaughton and moved to Fairfield, California. When widowed in 1960, she brought up her two children, Michele and Sean. After retiring in 1979, she managed a softball team for five years before moving to San Diego, California.

In 1988, Alice became part of Women in Baseball, a permanent display based at the Baseball Hall of Fame and Museum in Cooperstown, New York, which was unveiled to honor the entire All-American Girls Professional Baseball League. Afterwards, she was nominated and inducted into the Women's Hall of Fame in 2005 for the title of Spirit Of The Women's Hall Of Fame. The annual Women's Hall of Fame induction is co-hosted by Women's Museum of California (located in San Diego), Commission on the Status of Women, UC San Diego Women's Center, and San Diego State Women's Studies.

Alice Hohlmayer McNaughton was a longtime resident of Bonita, California, where she died in 2017 at the age of 92.

== Career statistics ==
Batting

| GP | AB | R | H | 2B | 3B | HR | RBI | SB | TB | BB | SO | BA | OBP | SLG |
|---|---|---|---|---|---|---|---|---|---|---|---|---|---|---|
| 486 | 1486 | 85 | 301 | 35 | 15 | 3 | 128 | 43 | 375 | 138 | 192 | .203 | .270 | .252 |

Pitching

| GP | W | L | W-L% | ERA | IP | H | RA | ER | BB | SO | WHIP |
|---|---|---|---|---|---|---|---|---|---|---|---|
| 89 | 33 | 32 | .508 | 2.58 | 579 | 533 | 246 | 166 | 141 | 126 | 1.16 |

Fielding

| GP | PO | A | E | TC | DP | FA |
|---|---|---|---|---|---|---|
| 468 | 4225 | 264 | 109 | 4598 | 101 | .976 |
