= Betty Wagoner =

American baseball player (1930–2006)

- Born: July 15, 1930; Lebanon, Missouri, US
- Died: May 9, 2006 (aged 75); South Bend, Indiana, US

Career statistics
- Games played: 665
- Runs scored: 367
- Runs batted in: 191
- Batting average: .271

Teams
- Muskegon Lassies (1948); South Bend Blue Sox (1948–1954)

Career highlights and awards
- 2× All-Star (1950, 1954); 2× AAGPBL champion (1951, 1952)

Betty Ann Wagoner (July 15, 1930 – May 9, 2006) was an American baseball player. She was a right fielder and pitcher who played from 1948 through 1954 in the All-American Girls Professional Baseball League (AAGPBL). Listed at 5 ft 2 in (1.57 m), 110 lb., she batted and threw left-handed.

An All-Star and a member of two championship teams, Betty Wagoner played in the All-American Girls Professional Baseball League during the final seven years of its existence. For most of her career Wagoner hit for batting average, moving along baserunners as an occasional slugger and often appeared among the league's top twenty hitters. A smart and alert runner, she moved aggressively in the right situations to take the extra base. Armed with a strong, accurate throwing arm, she had good range at right field, catching almost everything that came her way and always knew what to do with the ball. Eventually, she played at center field or first base, serving also as an occasional starting pitcher. She posted an 8–20 record in 32 pitching appearances, while her .271 batting average ranks her eleventh in the AAGPBL all-time list.

== Early life ==
Wagoner was born on July 15, 1930. A native of Lebanon, Missouri, Wagoner was a 1948 graduate of Bolivar High School. She started to play softball in Phillipsburg on the boy's softball team in grade school and later joined the girls' softball team at Bolivar, playing also for the YWCA team of Springfield during two summers.

Wagoner read about the AAGPBL in Life magazine when she was 12 years old. "I told my parents that someday I'd like to play in that league (if I was good enough)", she recalled in an interview. After graduating at 17, she attended a tryout at Chicago. She passed the test and was rewarded with a contract to play in the circuit.

== Career ==
Wagoner entered the league with the Lassies, playing for them only four days before joining South Bend for the rest of her career. In her rookie season, she hit a combined .278 (69-for-284) in 84 games for both teams. South Bend, with Marty McManus at the helm, ended in third place with a 57–69 record and lost to Grand Rapids in the first round of the playoffs, three to two games. In Game 1, Jean Faut pitched 20 innings to beat Alice Haylett and Grand Rapids, 3–2, in which has been reported as being the longest game in AAGPBL post-season history. Grand Rapids won Game 2 in 11 innings, 3–2, to tie the series, but Lillian Faralla hurled a four-hit, 2–1 victory in Game 3. In another extra-inning duel, Haylett took revenge in Game 4, defeating Faut and South Bend in 15 innings by a 1–0 score, while in decisive Game 5 Mildred Earp silenced the South Bend hitters in a one-hit, 1–0 shutout, and Grand Rapids advanced to the finals.

In 1949 Wagoner became the right fielder of South Bend. She appeared in a career-high 113 games and hit .230 (87-for-379), scoring 58 runs while driving in 26 more. Throughout the regular season, South Bend, now managed by Dave Bancroft, waged an up-and-down battle with Rockford for first place. Although South Bend had a four-game lead in August, both clubs tied with identical records of 75–36 at the end of the year. In the playoffs, Rockford eliminated South Bend in four straight games. By edict of league president Max Carey, the playoff victory also made Rockford the regular season champion team.

By 1950 the advantage began to shift toward the batter. That year, most pitchers were still adjusting to the new 10-inch ball introduced the previous season. Also, the pitching distance, set at 43 feet before 1948 and increased to 50 feet in 1949, was augmented to 55 feet in 1950. Betty Foss of Fort Wayne topped the league with a .346 average, while Rockford's Eleanor Callow and Racine's Sophie Kurys tied with seven home runs, and Grand Rapids' Pepper Paire finished with 70 runs batted in. Wagoner enjoyed a solid season, hitting .296 with 61 runs and 39 RBI in 106 games,. She also recorded career-best numbers in at-bats (388) and hits (115), and was selected for the All-Star Team. South Bend finished in fifth place with a 55–55 mark and dropped out of the playoffs.

In 1951 Karl Winsch took over as manager of South Bend. By the time the season rolled around, his wife Jean Faut was a successful and established pitcher. She led the league in strikeouts (135), tied for seventh in wins (15), and ranked third in earned run average (1.33) and in shutouts (seven). Wagoner, who was proficient at hitting line drives, played 110 games and hit a .272 average (102-for-375), driving in 41 runs and scoring 77 times to set career numbers in both categories. Faut reached her peak of the season on July 21, when she hurled a perfect game against the visiting Rockford Peaches at Playland Park. Ahead 2–0, she struck out five of the last nine hitters, including pitching ace Helen Nicol to end the game. Faut gave considerable credit for her perfect performance to the flawless fielding of her teammates. I had an extremely good team behind me, she recalled years later. To this day she remembered the shoestring catch Wagoner made on the right field foul line in the second inning. That was the only real scare I had. That was a tremendous catch, adding that Wagoner ran a long way on a dead run to snag it justoff the ground.

While South Bend placed third in the first-half standings, the team finished first in the second half, thus giving them a playoff berth. Their complete season record of 75 and 36 was best in the league in 1951, and the Blue Sox would end the season battling Rockford in the best-of-five championship round. The defending AAGPBL champion Rockford won the first two games, but South Bend won the next three games to clinch the title. Faut collected two of the victories, while Wagoner led all-hitters with a .600 average (6-for-10).

But everything came to a head in 1952, because South Bend manager Winsch became more demanding of his players. That season was to see Faut again lead the league in several pitching categories. She posted a 20–2 record in 23 games to set an all-time record in winning percentage (.909). She also recorded a career-best 0.93 ERA and led all pitchers with 114 strikeouts, but the fact that her husband managed the team created friction between Faut and many of her teammates. Meanwhile, Wagoner raised her average to .295, including 64 runs and 27 RBI in 97 games. Nevertheless, some of the players bristled under Winsch's leadership, many of them refusing to speak to him or their star pitcher. Dissension within the South Bend team peaked just before the season ended, when flashy infielder Charlene Pryer was disciplined following a dispute with Winsch. The incident occurred when he suspended Pryer from the team after she responded slowly to his order to pinch-run late in a game. In protest, five South Bend teammates joined Pryer in a walkout, leaving Winsch's team short-handed for the playoffs. Pryer was reinstated at the club, but she decided to retire for good. The championship series was a repeat of the previous year with South Bend again facing Rockford. It was the second league championship for South Bend and the second time Faut pitched the decisive Game 5. She also hit two triples and drove in two runs while turning in a 6–3 complete game victory.

In 1953 South Bend was weakened considerably by the player losses at the end of the previous season. The Blue Sox would finish the second from last, compiling a dismal 45–65 record. Wagoner dropped to .239 (84-for-352), driving in 27 runs while scoring 42 times in 97 games. In spite of everything that had gone wrong, Faut still turned in a solid season by leading the league in wins (17), strikeouts (153) and ERA (1.51) in 29 games, to win the Triple Crown and Player of the Year honors. She was worn down from all the dissension and retired at the end of the season.

Wagoner saw limited action in 1954, but she still batting for average and went 48-for-150 to collect a .320 mark in just only 48 games, joining the All-Star team as a reserve outfielder. South Bend finished second (48–44) and advanced to the playoffs, but was beaten in the first round by the Kalamazoo Lassies, who would end the season defeating Fort Wayne to become the winning team of the last championship in the league's history.

== Later life ==
Following her baseball career, Wagoner took a job at Bendix Corporation, where she worked as an office supervisor from 1952 to 1986. After retiring, she stayed active by constantly volunteering and by bowling and playing basketball. She gained induction into the Hall of Fame in Lebanon, Missouri, and also is part of the AAGPBL permanent display at the Baseball Hall of Fame and Museum at Cooperstown, New York, which was inaugurated in 1988 in honor of the entire league rather than individual baseball personalities.

Wagoner was a longtime resident of South Bend, Indiana, where she died, aged 75, from undisclosed causes. She was survived by one sister, three nieces, two nephews, and a large extended family.
