= Walk percentage =

Baseball statistic criterion

Walk percentage (also known as Base-on-balls percentage, BB%, or BBP) is a baseball statistic criterion.

The purpose of this offensive measurement is to gauge the percentage of a batter's plate appearances that result in the player being walked. A more recently developed statistic than batting average, it is used to determine hitters that have a better plate discipline.

== See also ==
- On-base percentage
- Walk-to-strikeout ratio
