= Eleanor Callow =

Canadian baseball player

- Left fielder
- Born: August 8, 1927; Winnipeg, Manitoba, Canada
- Died: October 28, 1974 (aged 47); Winnipeg, Manitoba, Canada
- Batted: Switch hitter Threw: Right

debut
- 1947, for the Peoria Redwings

Last appearance
- 1954, for the Rockford Peaches

Career statistics
- Batting average: .273
- Hits: 756
- Home runs: 55
- Runs batted in: 407
- Stolen bases: 214

Teams
- Peoria Redwings (1947); Chicago Colleens (1948); Rockford Peaches (1948–1954)

Career highlights and awards
- 3× AAGPBL champion (1948–1950); 4× AAGPBL All-Star Team (1951–1954); AAGPBL records: 55 career home runs; 60 career triples; .549 career slugging percentage

Eleanor 'Squirt' Callow (August 8, 1927 – October 28, 1974) was a Canadian left fielder who played from 1947 through 1954 for three teams of the All-American Girls Professional Baseball League (AAGPBL). Callow was a switch-hitter and threw right-handed. She was born in Winnipeg, Manitoba.

A consummate professional that hit for distance, Callow led the league in triples in four consecutive years from 1948 to 1951 and added home runs to her repertoire, particularly when it came to the postseason, where she batted .322 as a key part of the Peaches that won three consecutive league championships; she had 32 runs batted in in postseason play. She closed her career out with recognition to the All-Star Team in each of her last four seasons. When her career ended in 1954, she departed as the all-time leader in home runs and triples in league history.

== Women in baseball ==
Women have been playing professional baseball since the early 1930s, when Chattanooga Lookouts pitcher Jackie Mitchell struck out Babe Ruth and Lou Gehrig in succession, during an exhibition game against the New York Yankees in 1931.

The AAGPBL was a league that began to operate in 1943 in cities located on or near Lake Michigan. The main promoter was Philip K. Wrigley, owner of the Chicago Cubs, who worried about the viability of male professional baseball players during World War II decided to establish an alternate attraction. The league folded after the end of the 1954 season. Over the years the rules, equipment, and style of play in the league changed from softball to baseball (e.g., the size of the ball at the beginning was 12" in circumference, but at the end it was 9 1/4"). Eleven girls from Manitoba played in the league, including Callow. All of them received honorary inductions into the National Baseball Hall of Fame and Museum (1988), the Canadian Baseball Hall of Fame (1998), and the Manitoba Softball Hall of Fame (1998).

== Overview profile ==
During her career, Callow was among the most feared sluggers of the AAGPBL. A four-time All-Star, she was the Babe Ruth or Tris Speaker equivalent of the AAGPBL, accumulating more home runs and triples than any other player in league history. She was known for power, speed, patience at the plate and fielding. She overwhelmed opposite teams with her speed, by drawing walks, stealing bases, and catching difficult fly balls.

== AAGPBL career ==
Callow entered the AAGPBL in 1947 with the Peoria Redwings, playing for them during her rookie season before joining the Chicago Colleens expansion team for a small time in 1948. She was traded to the Rockford Peaches during the midseason and remained with them for the rest of her career, including in three consecutive championship titles (1948-'50) and also in the team's last ever game in 1954.

Beginning in 1948, Callow led the league in triples for four straight years and ended up with 60 in her career. She started off slow in the home run category with none during her rookie season, but by the rest of her eight years career she belted 55 to top the all-time list.

In 1948, Callow ended with a .251 batting average, but tied for second in home runs (6) and led the league for the first time in triples (15). She repeated as the leader in triples in 1949 (11) and 1950 (11). In 1951 she gained her first selection for the All-Star Team, after recording career-highs in average (.326), runs (66), runs batted in (84), hits (124), doubles (16), stolen bases (40), total bases (172) and walks (49); claimed her fourth triple title in a row, had the best fielding percentage of any outfielder, and tied with Fort Wayne Daisies' Betty Foss and teammate Alice Pollitt in home runs (4).

In 1952 Callow was unable to repeat the success of the previous season. Nevertheless, she finished third in home runs (8), fourth in triples (6), fifth in total bases (151), eighth in runs (56), ninth in RBI (49), and still made the All-Star Team. But she rebounded in 1953, hitting .303 (3rd league-best) with eight home runs (2nd) and 58 RBI (7th). She also scored 58 runs (8th) and stole 37 bases (8th), while making the All-Star Team for the third time.

By the time of her last season, Callow said goodbye hitting .324 with 20 home runs, 58 RBI and 23 stolen bases in 273 at-bats. In addition, she joined Joanne Weaver as the only two AAGPBL players to reach the 20 home runs and 20 stolen bases plateaus in the same season.

She is also one of five players to collect 400 or more career-RBIs, ranking third (407) behind Dorothy Schroeder (431) and Inez Voyce (422). Elizabeth Mahon and Pepper Paire recorded exactly 400 RBIs. The league ceased operations shortly after Callow's 27th birthday. Considering she had only 2,765 at-bats in her abbreviated career (Schroeder had 4,129 at-bats), Callow may have been the greatest clutch hitter in AAGPBL history.

== Career statistics ==
=== Batting ===
GP	AB	R	H	2B	3B	HR	RBI	SB	TB	BB	SO	BA	OBP	SLG	OPS
778	2765	381	756	88	60	55	407	214	1129	147	192	.273	.310	.408	.718

=== Fielding ===
GP	PO	A	E	TC	DP	FA
754	1316	87	60	1463	19	.960

== Personal life ==
She was born Eleanor Margaret Knudsen to Danish immigrants, the youngest of 10 children. Her first marriage, shortly after the end of World War II in Europe, was to Frank Leonard Callow, a private in the Canadian military, on June 17, 1945. However, he deserted her that September. After her mother's death in 1949, she began living with her sister Nora and brother-in-law Harry Brown. In summer 1971, she married James Glendenning Litterick, an electrician. After being diagnosed with cancer in the early 1960s, she died from it on October 28, 1974, at just 47 years old. Nora had also died from cancer in 1973 at 55 years old.

== Fact ==
- In 1992, filmmaker Penny Marshall premiered her film A League of Their Own, which was a fictionalized account of activities in the All-American Girls Professional Baseball League. Starring Geena Davis, Tom Hanks, Madonna, Lori Petty and Rosie O'Donnell, this film brought a rejuvenated interest to the extinct AAGPBL. Many baseball historians consider the league's players as pioneers of an important movement which has eventually brought women's athletics to the prominent place it occupies in the 21st century.

== Sources ==
- Encyclopedia of women and baseball - Leslie A. Heaphy, Mel Anthony May. Publisher: McFarland and Co., 2006. Format: Paperback, 438pp. Language: English. ISBN 978-0-7864-2100-8
- The Women of the All-American Girls Professional Baseball League: A Biographical Dictionary - W. C. Madden. Publisher: McFarland and Company, 2005. Format: Paperback, 295 pp. Language: English. ISBN 0-7864-2263-7
