= Doris Satterfield =

American baseball player

- Outfield
- Born: July 27, 1926; Belmont, North Carolina, U.S.
- Died: November 4, 1993 (aged 67); Grand Rapids, Michigan, U.S.
- Batted: Right Threw: Right

Career statistics
- Games played: 683
- Runs scored: 321
- Hits: 682
- Runs batted in: 366
- Batting average: .271

Teams
- Grand Rapids Chicks (1947–1954)

Career highlights and awards
- 3× All-Star (1950, 1953–1954); 2× AAGPBL champion (1947, 1953)

Doris L. Satterfield [Sadie] (July 27, 1926 – November 4, 1993) was a left and center fielder who played from 1947 through 1954 in the All-American Girls Professional Baseball League (AAGPBL). She batted and threw right-handed.

A three-time All-Star, Doris Satterfield established herself as one of the most dominant hitters in the All-American Girls Professional Baseball League during her career. A member of three champion teams, she ranks seventh in the all-time list with runs batted in and eleventh with a .271 batting average. She was also noted as providing a solid defense at outfield combined with a good and secure throwing arm.

== Early life ==
Born in Belmont, North Carolina, Satterfield started playing softball by the age of eleven. She joined the city league at age fifteen, and for three years took part in the National Softball Tournament held at Detroit, Michigan. She was noticed by scouts for the AAGPBL and offered a contract, but she decided to finish school first and earned a Bachelor of Science in Nursing degree.

== AAGPBL ==
Satterfield joined the league in 1947 with the Grand Rapids Chicks, playing for them her entire career in the circuit. Usually, she batted cleanup because of her ability to clear the bases with runners in scoring position. By April 1947, all of the league's players were flown to Havana, Cuba for the first AAGPBL spring training outside the United States, as part of a plan to create an International League of Girls Baseball. The Chicks roster, managed by Johnny Rawlings, included top notch players such as Mildred Earp, Alice Haylett, Ruth Lessing, Ruth Richard, Jane Stoll, Inez Voyce, Connie Wisniewski and Alma Ziegler. In the final Series, Earp pitched a four-hit, 1–0 shutout against the Racine Belles to win decisive Game 7.

In 1949, Satterfield led the league with 22 doubles. She earned her first All-Star berth in 1950, repeating in 1953 and 1954, while the Chicks, with Woody English at the helm, won their second title in 1953, two to zero games, against the Kalamazoo Lassies.

During the 1950 season, Satterfield spoiled a no-hit bid by Fort Wayne Daisies pitching great Dorothy Wiltse in the seventh inning, smacking a clean single to center field. In her last season, she posted career-numbers in average (.295) and RBI (79).

== Life after baseball ==
In addition, Satterfield and teammate Connie Wisniewski opened a small burger joint near the Grand Rapids theater. Called the Chicks Dugout, the business was moderately successful and the partners eventually sold it for a profit. She also worked as a nurse until her retirement in 1988.

Since 1988 Satterfield is part of Women in Baseball, a permanent display based at the Baseball Hall of Fame and Museum in Cooperstown, New York, which was unveiled to honor the entire All-American Girls Professional Baseball League rather than individual baseball personalities. She died in Grand Rapids, Michigan, at the age of 67.
