= Louise Arnold (baseball) =

American baseball player

- Pitcher
- Born: May 11, 1923; Pawtucket, Rhode Island, U.S.
- Died: May 27, 2010 (aged 87); South Bend, Indiana, U.S.
- Batted: Right Threw: Right

debut
- 1948

Last appearance
- 1952

Teams
- South Bend Blue Sox (1948–'49, 1951–'52)

Career highlights and awards
- Two Championship Teams (1951-'52); Pitched a no-hitter (1951); Single-season leader in winning percentage (1951); South Bend Baseball Hall of Fame Inductee (2005)

Louise Veronica Arnold [Lou] (May 11, 1923 – May 27, 2010) was a female pitcher who played during four seasons for the South Bend Blue Sox of the All-American Girls Professional Baseball League (AAGPBL). Listed at 5' 5", 145 lb., she batted and threw right-handed.

The All-American Girls Professional Baseball League was a circuit that began to operate in 1943. Since the only organized ball for women in the United States was softball, the league officials created a game which included both fast-pitch softball and baseball. Compared to softball, the crucial differences were that nine (not ten) players were used, and runners could lead off, slide and steal bases. In its twelve years of history the AAGPBL evolved through many stages. These differences varied from the beginning of the league, progressively extending the length of the base paths and pitching distance and decreasing the size of the ball until the final year of play in 1954. For the first five years the circuit used a fastpitch underhand motion, shifted to sidearm in 1947, and never really became baseball until overhand pitching began in 1948.

A native of Pawtucket, Rhode Island, Arnold was the youngest of 13 children into the family of George and Mary Ann (née McCormick) Arnold, of English and Irish ancestry. She was a top all-around athlete in high school, and an AAGPBL scout signed her thinking that she had athletic abilities, endurance and fitness necessary to play baseball. Arnold attended to a league tryout in 1948. She had no baseball position, but the league was desperate for overhand pitchers, so she seemed like a good pitching prospect.

Arnold entered the league in 1948 with the South Bend Blue Sox, playing for them two years. Out in 1950 for undisclosed reasons, she returned in 1951 to South Bend for two more years. Her most productive season came in 1951, when she posted a 10–2 record for a league-high .833 winning percentage. She also hurled a no-hitter, tossed 32 consecutive scoreless innings, and completed nine of her twelve starts. In addition, Arnold was a member of two Blue Sox clubs to win consecutive titles in 1951 and 1952.

Following her baseball career, Arnold lived in South Bend, Indiana for the rest of her life. She took a job at Bendix Corporation, where she worked on the brake line for thirty years.

Arnold was inducted into the South Bend Baseball Hall of Fame in 2005. She is also part of the AAGPBL permanent display at the Baseball Hall of Fame and Museum at Cooperstown, New York, opened in 1988, which is dedicated to the entire league rather than any individual player. She died in South Bend, sixteen days after her 87th birthday.
