= Arthur Meyerhoff =

American advertising agency executive (1895–1986)

Arthur E. Meyerhoff (1895–1986) was an advertising agency executive and entrepreneur. He was born in Chicago, Illinois.

Meyerhoff died in 1986; services were held at the Fourth Presbyterian Church in Rancho Santa Fe, California.
