= Margaret Holgerson =

- Pitcher / Infielder
- Born: January 28, 1927; Mobile, Alabama, U.S.
- Died: March 23, 1990 (aged 63); Mobile, Alabama, U.S.
- Batted: Right Threw: Right

Teams
- Rockford Peaches (1946–1949); Muskegon Lassies (1949–1950); Grand Rapids Chicks (1950–1952)

Career highlights and awards
- AAGPBL champion (1948); Threw four no-hitters; Pitched a postseason no-hitter on September 11, 1948

Margaret Holgerson (January 28, 1927 – March 23, 1990) was an American pitcher and infielder who played from 1946 to 1952 in the All-American Girls Professional Baseball League (AAGPBL). She batted and threw right-handed. After being married in 1948 she played under the name of Margaret Silvestri. One of only two pitchers to throw four no-hitters in the AAGPBL, she ranks in the top ten in the pitching all-time list for the best earned run average.

== Early life ==
Born in Mobile, Alabama, Marge Holgerson started her career at second base but turned into a solid pitcher after a slow start. She collected a 76–69 record during her seven years in the league, allowing a 1.07 base runner per inning pitched, while her 1.94 career earned run average ranks her eighth in the all-time list of AAGPBL pitchers with at least 1,000 innings of work.

== Debut Season ==
Holgerson entered the league in 1946 with the Rockford Peaches, playing for them through the 1949 mid-season before joining the Muskegon Lassies (1949–1950) and the Grand Rapids Chicks (1950–1952). She had a natural sidearm delivery, which the league had converted to in 1946. She posted a 2–2 record for Rockford as a rookie, while pitching 33 innings in five starts. At the plate, she hit a .190 batting average in 61 games.

In 1947 Holgerson had more opportunities to show her talent. She made 27 pitching appearances, and went 9–15 with a 2.42 ERA and 48 strikeouts in 201 innings. But she would fare even better in 1948, when the league shifted strictly to overhand motion. She then turned in a competent pitcher, going 16–15 with a 1.92 ERA while setting personal records in wins, games pitched (37), strikeouts (194) and innings (277). She also finished fourth for the most strikeouts, sixth in ERA and seventh in innings. The Peaches, with Bill Allington at the helm, advanced to the best-of-five series of the Western Division and swept the Peoria Redwings in three games.

Racine repeated the feat in the best-of-five first round, and upset the Kenosha Comets in three games. In Game 1, Lois Florreich recorded the first no-hitter in series history during a 6–0 victory, while Helen Fox followed with a two-hit, 3–2 win in Game 2. Then, Holgerson recorded a second no-hitter against the Comets, 4–0, helping Racine to advance to the final series.

At the end, the Peaches never gave the Fort Wayne Daisies a chance as Rockford jumped out to a three-game lead and clinched the Championship Title four games to one. Fox won Games 2 and 5 (3–2, 4–2), while Florreich and Holgerson hurled shutouts in Game 1 (1–0) and Game 3 (10–0), respectively.

In 1949, Holgerson divided her playing time between Racine and Muskegon, as the league shifted players as needed to help new teams stay afloat. She recorded a solid 1.70 ERA with both clubs, though she ended with a 5–10 mark because of lack of run support from the Lassies.

Holgerson opened 1950 with Muskegon and was traded to Grand Rapids during the mid-season. She posted a combined 14–12 record and a 2.00 ERA in 33 games, while striking out 101 batters in 230 innings, ranking sixth both in ERA and strikeouts (101) and seventh in innings pitched (230).

In 1951 Holgerson went 16–6, set a career-best 1.53 ERA, and matched her career-high wins mark. She crowned her successful year by ending second with 123 strikeouts, being surpassed only by Jean Faut of the South Bend Blue Sox (135). She also finished fourth in ERA and ninth in winning percentage (.727), while tying for fifth in shutouts (5), for sixth in complete games (21), and for ninth in innings (200).

Holgerson had a 14–9 record with 78 strikeouts and a 2.36 ERA in her final season of 1952, while working 168 innings in 24 pitching appearances.

Margaret Holgerson Silvestri, along with her former teammates and opponents, received their long overdue recognition when the Baseball Hall of Fame and Museum dedicated a permanent display to the All American Girls Professional Baseball League in 1988. She died in her homeland of Mobile, Alabama, at the age of 63.

== Career statistics ==
Pitching

GP	W	L	W-L%	ERA	IP	H	RA	ER	BB	SO	WHIP	SO/BB
168	76	69	.510	1.94	1241	832	393	267	497	599	1.07	1.20

Batting

GP	AB	R	H	2B	3B	HR	RBI	SB	BB	SO	BA	OBP	SLG
201	622	47	97	1	6	0	44	30	24	34	.160	.200	.186

Fielding

PO	A	E	TC	FA
52	349	30	422	.930

Postseason

GP	W	L	W-L%	ERA	IP	H	RA	ER	BB	SO	WHIP	SO/BB
6	3	1	.750	1.64	44	19	8	8	27	30	1.05	1.11
