= Elizabeth Mahon =

- Outfield/Second base
- Born: November 18, 1919; Greenville, South Carolina, U.S.
- Died: September 6, 2001 (aged 81); South Bend, Indiana, U.S.
- Batted: Right Threw: Right

Teams
- Minneapolis Millerettes (1944); Kenosha Comets (1944); South Bend Blue Sox (1945–1952)

Career highlights and awards
- Two-time All-Star (1946, 1949); Two-time AAGPBL Championship Team (1951–1952); Two-time RBI single-season leader (1946, 1951)

Elizabeth B. Mahon (November 18, 1919 – September 6, 2001) was an American outfielder who played from 1944 through 1954 in the All-American Girls Professional Baseball League (AAGPBL). Listed at 5 ft 7 in (1.70 m), 135 lb., Mahon batted and threw right-handed. She was born in Greenville, South Carolina.

== Early life ==
Lib Mahon was one of six children of David Mahon and Pearl Mahon. Her father and older brother were avid baseball fans, while her younger brother played sandlot ball and her three sisters handled most of the chores around home. At age of twelve, Mahon and her older sisters played for a local basketball team sponsored by the Brandon Cotton Mill, where their father worked as a truck driver. She also played intramural sports at Parker High, including fastpitch softball, field hockey and soccer.

Mahon proved herself to be one of the most competent ballplayers in AAGPBL history. At a very early age, she got used to playing ball with her brothers in Greenville brownfields. She not only learned how to play the games, but also gained self-confidence by setting and reaching goals, self-esteem by continual growth, and respect for others and themselves. Lib, who grew up in a mill village located directly across the street from the Brandon Mills, was among the most talented of those who ever played on the improvised baseball diamonds that were usually the property of one of the area's many textile mills. It was not easy for a female ball player to hone her diamond skills in the thirties, because the high schools did offer athletic programs for female students, and the girls who liked baseball could often be seen playing with the boys.

Part of a modest and big family, Mahon decided to take a job in a cotton mill while completing her senior year in high school. Even though life at the mill meant 55-hour weeks for those who were considered full-time employees, girls' athletic teams usually were made up of employers who held jobs at their respective plants, as the games were played on weekends, though an occasional weekday game came (into the picture) from time to time. While it was common practice for men's mill teams to put talented ball players on the local payroll to shore up the strength of their lineup, the girls just played for fun. Despite being one of the better players around the Greenville area, Mahon never received payment for playing on any of these teams.

Mahon continued to work at her boring mill job following her graduation in 1937, until an aunt offered to pay her a college education at Winthrop College. Mahon accepted the generous proposition and began her freshman year on the campus in 1938. She finished college in 1942 with a degree in physical education, and spent one year in Whitmire, South Carolina, teaching all subjects to a class of seventh graders. She returned to Greenville in 1944 and took a job in the U.S. Post Office.

While at college, Mahon started a close friendship with Viola Thompson, a talented fastpitch softball pitcher with the same passion for baseball. Eventually, Mahon played softball in Greenville on the same team with Thompson. In the same year, a talent scout offered Mahon and Thompson an invitation to come to the newly founded All-American Girls Professional Baseball League tryouts, which were to be held at Wrigley Field in Chicago, Illinois. Both Mahon and Thompson managed to win full-time jobs in the AAGPBL for the 1944 season.

== AAGPBL career ==
Mahon was assigned to the Minneapolis Millerettes, a helpless and unfortunate franchise that did not last long in the league. She eventually was spotted by Kenosha Comets manager Marty McManus, who traded three players for her during the midseason. Mahon played at outfield and took an occasional turn at one of the infield spots, but she was especially noted by her hitting ability. In her first season, she hit .211 with 38 runs batted in and a career-high three home runs in 107 games. She quickly established herself as a solid player and assured a return for the 1945 season. That year, McManus joined the South Bend Blue Sox and traded for her again. Mahon responded with a hitting streak which spanned 13 games, tying an all-time record set by Rockford Peaches' Mildred Warwick in 1943.

In 1946, Mahon hit .276 for the sixth best batting average and led the batters with 72 runs batted in. She also was credited for stealing 114 bases out of 116 attempts, but for most of the time, Mahon was the cleanup hitter for the Blue Sox. She helped her team to clinch the regular pennant in 1951, after leading the league with 60 RBI while hitting .269. She also showed her offensive consistency by driving in 68 runs (second) in 1951 and 65 (third) in 1948.

Mahon spent a total of nine seasons in the league. Along the way, she was chosen for the AAGPBL All Star team on two occasions (1946, 1949), and posted a career batting average of .248 (721-for-2903), including 432 runs and 400 RBI in 837 game appearances. Her 400 RBI ties her with Pepper Paire for fourth best in the AAGPBL's all-time list, behind Dorothy Schroeder (431), Inez Voyce (422) and Eleanor Callow (407).

Mahon quit playing during the 1952 season, but did not return to South Carolina. By then the AAGPBL had begun to go downhill as interest in the novelty of top-flight women's baseball was losing its luster, and baseball, in general, was beginning to fall in hardest times as well as the salaries, forcing club owners could get players to play at their clubs for relatively cheap. Then, Mahon accepted a well remunerated teaching position in the public school system of South Bend, Indiana. After earning a master's degree at Indiana University, in 1960, she remained as a teacher and later a guidance counselor until her retirement in 1981.

Mahon continued to live in South Bend, where she died at the age of 81. Her final honor came posthumously, when she was inducted into the South Carolina Athletic Hall of Fame on May 5, 2005. Mahon is one of only two South Carolina natives to play in the All-American Girls Professional Baseball League, the other being her longtime friend Viola Thompson, who had been inducted in the SCAHOF in 1998.

== Career statistics ==
Batting

GP	AB	R	H	2B	3B	HR	RBI	SB	BB	SO	BA	OBP	SLG	OPS
837	2562	432	721	84	34	8	400	SB	TB	358	150	.281	.370	.720

Fielding

GP	PO	A	E	TC	DP	FA
807	1190	236	58	1484	28	.961

== Bibliography ==
- All-American Girls Professional Baseball League Record Book – W. C. Madden. Publisher: McFarland & Company, 2000. Format: Paperback, 294pp. Language: English. ISBN 0-7864-3747-2. ISBN 978-0-7864-3747-4
- Baseball In The Carolinas: 25 Essays On The States' Hardball Heritage – Chris Holaday, Clyde King. Publisher: McFarland & Company, 2002. Format: Paperback, 192 pp. Language: English. ISBN 0-7864-1318-2 ISBN 9780786413188
- Women of the All-American Girls Professional Baseball League: A Biographical Dictionary - W. C. Madden. Publisher: McFarland & Company, 2005. Format: Paperback, 295 pp. Language: English. ISBN 0-7864-3747-2. ISBN 978-0-7864-2263-0
