= Inez Voyce =

American baseball player (1924–2022)

- First base
- Born: August 16, 1924; Rathbun, Iowa, U.S.
- Died: July 26, 2022 (aged 97); Santa Monica, California, U.S.
- Batted: Left Threw: Left

AAGPBL debut
- 1946, for the South Bend Blue Sox

Last AAGPBL appearance
- 1953, for the Grand Rapids Chicks

Teams
- South Bend Blue Sox (1946); Grand Rapids Chicks (1947–1953)

Career highlights and awards
- Two-time Championship Team (1947, 1953)

Inez Ferne Voyce (August 16, 1924 – July 26, 2022), nicknamed Lefty, was a first basewoman who played from 1946 through 1953 in the All-American Girls Professional Baseball League (AAGPBL). Listed at 5' 6", 148 lb., she batted and threw left-handed.

== Early life ==
A native of Rathbun, Iowa, Voyce began playing sandlot ball with her brothers at a very early age and listened to radio broadcasts of Chicago Cubs games. She spent her student years attending Seymour grade school and high school, and played on the girls' basketball and softball teams. She later attended business college at American Institute of Commerce in Davenport from 1942 to 1943.

After graduating, Voyce enlisted as an apprentice in the Navy. She served as a secretary to the legal officer at Hunters Point Naval Shipyard in San Francisco, California, attaining the rank of second class yeoman, and working from 1944 to 1946. At the time of her discharge, Voyce received an invitation to attend a tryout with the All-American Girls Professional Baseball League during the 1946 spring training, which was held in Pascagoula, Mississippi. She made the grade and was assigned to the South Bend Blue Sox.

== AAGPBL career ==
In 1946 Voyce hit a .210 average in 104 games for South Bend. The team advanced to the playoffs, but lost to the Racine Belles in the first round. She was traded to the Grand Rapids Chicks at the end of the season. After being traded, Voyce emerged as one of the most dynamics hitters in the league, helping the Chicks to capture two titles and making each playoff in her seven-year tenure with the team. In 1947 she hit .214 in 113 games and finished third in runs batted in (45), providing a one-two punch along with versatile Connie Wisniewski (.291, 24 RBI), to support a pitching staff consisting of Mildred Earp (20-8), Alice Haylett (19-11) and Wisniewski (16-14). Managed by Johnny Rawlings, Grand Rapids dispatched South Bend in the first round and defeated Racine in the finals to clinch the championship title. Earp was the heroine of the final, even though she lost Game 1, 2–0, in 11 innings after retiring the first 21 Belles batters. She rebounded to win Game 4 on a 3–0 shutout, and then pitched a four-hit, 1–0 shutout to win decisive Game 7.

Voyce continued to improve in 1948, ending with 52 RBI, 46 runs, 99 hits and a .227 average in 126 games. In 1949, in a pitching dominated league, she hit .257 (0.021 behind champion bat Doris Sams) with three home runs and 53 RBI while scoring 51 runs in 113 games. She shared the home run title with Thelma Eisen and Audrey Wagner and finished second in RBI. The defending champion Chicks won the first round of the playoffs but lost in the semi-finals.

In 1950 Voyce raised her average to .292 and collected career-numbers in RBI (66) and games (113). The next year she hit .285 in 106 games, including 43 runs and 49 RBI. Her most productive season came in 1952, when she posted career-highs in average (.295), home runs (10), hits (115), and runs scored (57) in 107 games, while driving in 54 runs. At this point, Grand Rapids qualified for the playoffs each season, but failed in the first round in 1950 and lost the finals to South Bend in 1951 and 1952. Voyce dropped to .269 in 1953, her final season with the Chicks, but produced 103 hits, 55 runs and 60 RBI. For the seven consecutive year, she appeared in at least 104 games (112) and reached the playoffs.

== 1953 AAGPBL Playoffs ==
=== First round ===
The Grand Rapids Chicks, with Woody English at the helm, faced the Rockford Peaches in the first round of the playoffs in a best-of-three series. In Game 1 Rockford scored early and defeated the visiting Chicks, 9–2, to win the opener. In Game 2, Earlene Risinger silenced the Peaches' bats to just two measly hits en route to a complete game, 2–0 shutout. In Game 3 Grand Rapids starter Dorothy Mueller pitched well enough to beat Rockford, 4–3, and the Chicks advanced to the Championship Series to face the Kalamazoo Lassies, who defeated the Fort Wayne Daisies in the other first round series games.

=== Championship Series ===
In the final series, The Grand Rapids Chicks swept the Kalamazoo Lassies in the best of three game set, by the scores of 5–2 and 4–1. In Game 1 Studnicka started for Grand Rapids and allowed only two runs in eight innings of work. With the score tied 2–2 going into the fourth inning, the Chicks scored three runs off Lassies’ pitcher Gloria Cordes. A tie-breaking sacrifice fly by Alma Ziegler scored Dolores Moore, and another RBI sacrifice fly Voyce put the Chicks up 4–2. A RBI single by Joyce Ricketts extended the lead to 5–2. When the Lassies first two batters reached base in the final inning, manager English promptly brought in reliever Eleanor Moore, who retired the next three batters in order. She struck out Isabel Alvarez for the first out, retired Dorothy Schroeder with a pop fly to shortstop Ziegler, and beat June Peppas for the final out of the game.

== Highlights ==
In an eight-year career, Voyce posted a .256 average in 894 games, stole 168 bases, scored 386 runs, and 137 of her 781 hits were for extrabases. She ranks 9th in the all-time list with 28 home runs, being one of the few league hitters to belt two homers in a single game. One of five players with 400 or more RBI, Voyce is second in AAGPBL history for career RBI with 422, behind the leader Dorothy Schroeder (431) and over Eleanor Callow (407), Elizabeth Mahon (400) and Pepper Paire (400). A patient batter, she walked 480 times against only 144 strikeouts for an outstanding walk-to-strikeout ratio of 3.34, while collecting a .358 on-base percentage and a .329 of slugging for a solid .687 OBP. Voyce gained prestige as an excellent first base fielder and was even called acrobatic by her teammates. Eventually, she appeared in a few games as an emergency pitcher.

== Batting statistics ==
GP	AB	R	H	2B	3B	HR	RBI	SB	BB	SO	BA	OBP	SLG	OPS
894	3047	386	781	81	28	28	422	168	480	144	.256	.358	.329	.687

== Life after baseball ==
Following her baseball retirement, Voyce worked for a small company for 32 years because of the skills she had acquired at Hunters Point Naval Shipyard. After retiring she took up golf. Voyce died in Santa Monica, California on July 26, 2022, at the age of 97.
