= Position player =

In baseball, certain players on defense

In baseball, a position player is a player who on defense plays as an infielder, outfielder, or catcher. A pitcher is generally not considered a position player. A designated hitter, who bats but does not play any defensive position, is also not considered a position player.

Position players are eligible to pitch, and a manager will use a position player as a relief pitcher on some occasions. This typically happens if a game is a blowout, if no other pitchers are available, or if the game has gone well into extra innings.

== In other sports ==
In ice hockey, "position player" refers to all non-goaltender players (forwards and defencemen), although "skater" is the more common term.
