= Pepper Paire =

- Catcher/Infielder
- Born: May 29, 1924; Los Angeles, California, US
- Died: February 2, 2013 (aged 88); Los Angeles, California, US
- Batted: Right Threw: Right

Teams
- Minneapolis Millerettes (1944); Fort Wayne Daisies (1945); Racine Belles (1946–1947); Grand Rapids Chicks (1948–1952); Fort Wayne Daisies (1952–1953)

Career highlights and awards
- 1948 AAGPBL All-Star Team; AAGPBL Championship Team (1946); Single-season leader for the most runs batted in (1950)

Lavone A. "Pepper" Paire Davis (May 29, 1924 – February 2, 2013) was a baseball catcher and infielder who played from 1944 through 1953 in the All-American Girls Professional Baseball League (AAGPBL). Listed at 5 ft 4 in (1.63 m), 138 lb., she batted and threw right-handed.

== Overview profile ==
An All-Star catcher, Paire was a fine defensive player with good range on the field and a strong throwing arm. She exhibited an aggressive catching style, leading to a broken collarbone in her rookie season. She suffered numerous injuries thereafter, but kept on playing. Basically a line-drive hitter, she had a compact swing and tremendous plate discipline, collecting a significant 2.63 walk-to-strikeout ratio (308-to-117). A lifetime .225 hitter, she made good contact, hitting safely more frequently with runners on base or when the team was behind in the score, as her 400 runs batted in ties her in fourth place with Elizabeth Mahon on the all-time list, behind Dorothy Schroeder (431), Inez Voyce (422) and Eleanor Callow (407). In addition, the versatile Paire played shortstop and third base, and even pitched. She also was a member of a championship team and made the playoffs in nine of her ten seasons.

In 60 playoff games, she hit .211 with one home run and 16 RBI, including one triple and seven stolen bases.

== Early life ==
Lavone A. Paire was the daughter of Charles Edward Paire from Montana and Hortense Theresa (née LaPage) Paire Blazek from South Dakota. A native of Los Angeles, California, Paire grew up playing baseball with her older brother, Joseph L. "Joe" Paire, and started playing baseball at age nine for a grocery store of Santa Monica, in a time that each victory earned the players free groceries during the Depression Era. She attended the University Senior High School, located in West Los Angeles, and continued excelling in sports, playing on semi-professional softball teams along with Faye Dancer, with whom she was recruited by Bill Allington for the All-American Girls Professional Baseball League.

== AAGPBL career ==
Paire entered the league in 1944 with the Minneapolis Millerettes. She hit .240 in 60 games as a rookie catcher and was moved to the Fort Wayne Daisies in 1945. That season she slipped to .196 as a shortstop, but paced the Daisies with 39 RBI and led the league with the fewest strikeouts (six). Then she found herself on the move again, this time to the Racine Belles from 1946 through 1947 and then the Grand Rapids Chicks from 1948 to the 1952 midseason, when she returned to the Daisies until her final season in 1953. She also moved around the field over the years, repeating at shortstop (1946), catching again (1947), and switching to third base (1948), before establishing herself as a catcher for the rest of her career.

In 1946 Paire hit a solid .238 with 59 RBI in 101 games for the league champion Belles, in a year characterized by strong pitching and low batting averages. Batting crown winner Dorothy Kamenshek led hitters with a .316 mark while pitchers Connie Wisniewski and Joanne Winter tied for a league-lead 33 wins.

Paire was one of two hundred players to attend the first AAGPBL spring training outside the United States, which was held in 1947 in Cuba at the Gran Stadium de La Habana. She enjoyed a good year, batting .226 with 50 RBI and recording career numbers in hits (97), runs (35), doubles (14), and stolen bases (18).

Paire earned an All-Star Team berth in 1948, a year in which she caught a career-high 114 games and hit .186 with 24 runs and 27 RBI. She caught 110 games in both 1949 and 1950, improving her averages to .205 and .249, respectively. In 1950 she topped the league with 70 RBI and led all catchers with a .979 fielding percentage. After that, she hit a career-high .264 with 56 RBI in 1951, and shared catching duties with Rita Briggs in her last two seasons for the Daisies.

== Life after baseball ==
Subsequently, Paire played amateur softball and bowling. She worked for the Howard Hughes Aircraft Company, married Bob Davis, and had three children, William, Robert, and Susan. She also opened an electronics business with her fellow player and longtime friend Faye Dancer. Paire retired in 1963 to Van Nuys, California, and served as the spokesperson for the Women's National Adult Baseball Association, for female players between the ages of 18 and 65. She is included in a Women in Baseball permanent display, opened in 1988 at the National Baseball Hall of Fame and Museum in Cooperstown, New York.

Paire also coauthored the Official Song of the All-American Girls Professional Baseball League along with Nalda Bird. The theme, named Victory Song, was popularized in the 1992 film A League of Their Own, directed by Penny Marshall and starring Geena Davis, Tom Hanks, Madonna, Rosie O'Donnell and Lori Petty. The film was a fictionalized account dedicated to the women who played in the league during the course of World War II. In their annual reunions since 1998, it is customary for the original AAGPBL players to sing We're the members of the All-American League. We come from cities near and far. We've got Canadians, Irish ones, and Swedes. We're all for one, we're one for all. We're all Americans. Additionally, Paire served as technical advisor for Marshall's film.

In December 2009, Paire released her own book, Dirt in the Skirt, to set the record straight on her life and fellow players from the AAGPBL. The book includes forewords by Penny Marshall and Tom Hanks.

== Death ==
On February 2, 2013, Paire died of natural causes in Van Nuys, Los Angeles, California. She was 88 years old.

== Career statistics ==
Batting

GP	AB	R	H	2B	3B	HR	RBI	SB	TB	BB	SO	BA	OBP	SLG
926	3164	251	713	79	15	2	400	79	828	308	117	.225	.295	.262

Fielding

GP	PO	A	E	TC	DP	FA
899	2564	1501	239	4304	101	.945
