= Walk-to-strikeout ratio =

Baseball statistic

In baseball statistics, walk-to-strikeout ratio (BB/K) is a measure of a hitter's plate discipline and knowledge of the strike zone. Generally, a hitter with a good walk-to-strikeout ratio must exhibit enough patience at the plate to refrain from swinging at bad pitches and take a base on balls, but he must also have the ability to recognize pitches within the strike zone and avoid striking out. Joe Morgan and Wade Boggs are two examples of hitters with a good walk-to-strikeout ratio. A hit by pitch is not counted statistically as a walk and therefore not counted in the walk-to-strikeout ratio.

The inverse of this, the strikeout-to-walk ratio, is used to compare pitchers.

== Leaders ==
Best single-season walk-to-strikeout ratios from 1913 to 2011:

Rank	Player	Team	LG	Year	BB	SO	BB/SO
1	Joe Sewell	NYY	AL	1932	56	3	18.67
2	Joe Sewell	NYY	AL	1933	71	4	17.75
3	Joe Sewell	CLE	AL	1925	64	4	16.00
4	Joe Sewell	CLE	AL	1929	48	4	12.00
5	Charlie Hollocher	CHC	NL	1922	58	5	11.60
6	Lou Boudreau	CLE	AL	1948	98	9	10.89
7	Eddie Collins	CWS	AL	1925	87	8	10.88
8	Joe Sewell	CLE	AL	1926	65	6	10.83
9	Eddie Collins	CWS	AL	1923	84	8	10.50
10	Mickey Cochrane	PHA	AL	1929	69	8	8.63
11	Joe Sewell	CLE	AL	1923	98	12	8.17
12	Tommy Holmes	BSN	NL	1945	70	9	7.78
13	Joe Sewell	NYY	AL	1931	62	8	7.75
14	Tris Speaker	CLE	AL	1920	97	13	7.46
15	Joe Sewell	CLE	AL	1927	51	7	7.29
16	Mickey Cochrane	PHA	AL	1927	50	7	7.14
17	Tris Speaker	CLE	AL	1918	64	9	7.11
18	Lou Boudreau	CLE	AL	1949	70	10	7.00
18	Tris Speaker	CLE	AL	1922	77	11	7.00

In 2018, Jose Ramirez had the best BB/K ratio in the major leagues, at 1.33.

== See also ==
- On-base percentage
- Walk percentage
