= Alice Pollitt =

- Third base/Shortstop
- Born: July 19, 1929; Lansing, Michigan, U.S.
- Died: March 15, 2016 (aged 86); Bay Bluffs, Harbor Springs, Michigan, U.S.
- Batted: Right Threw: Right

Teams
- Rockford Peaches (1947–1953)

Career highlights and awards
- Two-time All-Star Team (1951–1952); Three Championship Teams (1948–1950); Six playoff appearances (1948-'53); Single-season leader in home runs (1951); Women in Baseball – AAGPBL Permanent Display Baseball Hall of Fame and Museum (1988)

Alice Pollitt Deschaine [born Margaret Pollitt] (July 19, 1929 – March 15, 2016) was an infielder who played from 1947 through 1953 in the All-American Girls Professional Baseball League (AAGPBL). Listed at 5 ft 3 in (1.60 m), 150 lb., she batted and threw right-handed.

A native of Lansing, Michigan, Margaret Pollitt was born to John and Mary (née Miller) Pollitt. She grew up in a home where sport was considered of vital importance. Her father, who had been a professional soccer player in England before coming to the United States, was also an avid baseball fanatic and motivated her to play the game at a very early age.

A two-time All-Star, Pollitt was discovered by an AAGPBL scout while she was playing in her hometown and entered the league in 1947. She played all seven of her AAGPBL seasons with the Rockford Peaches, helping them win three championships pennants by combining a sharp defense and provided stability through the middle of the batting order.

Pollitt started at shortstop in her rookie season, then anchored third base for six years as part of an infield that included Dorothy Kamenshek at first base, Mildred Deegan at second and Dorothy Harrell at shortstop.

Her most productive season came in 1951, when she collected a .299 batting average and tied with Fort Wayne Daisies' Betty Foss and teammate Eleanor Callow for the most home runs (four). Pollitt also ranked fourth in total bases (158), fifth in hits (121) and runs (88), seventh in average, while tying for second in triples with Kamenshek (9) behind Rockford Peaches' Eleanor Callow (10). In addition, she gained her first selection for the All-Star Team.

In 1952, Pollitt batted .270 and stole 35 bases, being selected to the All-Star Team as a reserve infielder. She then posted career-numbers with a .315 average and 14 doubles in 1953, her last year in the league.

== Personal life ==
Politt married Glenmore Deschaine in 1951. They had two children: a son and a daughter.

In November 1988, Politt along with her former teammates and opponents, received recognition, when the Baseball Hall of Fame and Museum in Cooperstown, New York, dedicated a permanent display to the All American Girls Professional Baseball League.

Politt died on March 15, 2016, at Bay Bluffs, Harbor Springs, Michigan. She was survived by her children and extended family.

== Career statistics ==
Batting

GP	AB	R	H	2B	3B	HR	RBI	SB	BB	SO	BA	OBP	SLG
606	2177	250	555	41	35	8	214	181	139	184	.255	.300	.317

Collective fielding

GP	PO	A	E	TC	DP	FA
580	955	1252	200	2207	98	.971
