= Helen Nicol =

Canadian baseball player (1920–2021)

Helen Nicol-Fox
- Pitcher
- Born: May 9, 1920; Ardley, Alberta, Canada
- Died: July 25, 2021 (aged 101); Mesa, Arizona, U.S.
- Batted: Right Threw: Right

Career statistics
- Win–loss record: 163–118
- Earned run average: 1.89
- Strikeouts: 1,076

Teams
- Kenosha Comets (1943–1947); Rockford Peaches (1947–1952)

Career highlights and awards
- AAGPBL All-Star Team (1943); 3× AAGPBL champion (1948–1950); Triple crown (1943); 2× AAGPBL ERA leader (1943, 1944); AAGPBL records: All-time leader in games pitched (313); All-time leader in innings (2,382); All-time leader in wins (163); All-time leader in strikeouts (1,076)

Helen Nicol (later Fox; May 9, 1920 – July 25, 2021) was a Canadian-American baseball pitcher who played from 1943 through 1952 in the All-American Girls Professional Baseball League (AAGPBL).

Listed at 5 feet 3 inches (1.60 m), 120 pounds (54 kg), Nicol batted and threw right-handed. She was sometimes credited as Helen Fox or Nickie Fox.

The 1992 film A League of Their Own, directed by filmmaker Penny Marshall, revitalized interest in women's baseball and helped memorialize a neglected chapter of sports history: the All-American Girls Professional Baseball League, which gave over 600 women athletes the opportunity to play professional baseball and to play it at a level never before attained. Nicol was one of them.

Nicol turned 100 in May 2020 and died in Mesa, Arizona, in July 2021, at the age of 101.

== Career ==
A native of Ardley, Alberta, Canada, Nicol has been catalogued by many as one of the greatest pitchers in AAGPBL history. She holds several all-time pitching records, including appearances (313), wins (163), consecutive wins (13), strikeouts (1,076), batters faced (7,537), and innings pitched (2,382). In addition, she posted a 13–7 record with a 1.83 earned run average in postseason games.

Nicol entered the AAGPBL in 1943 with the Kenosha Comets, playing for them through the 1947 midseason before joining the Rockford Peaches (1947–1952). She enjoyed a solid first season, leading the league with 31 wins, a 1.81 ERA, 220 strikeouts, eight shutouts and 348 innings of work, including the aforementioned string of (13) wins in a row. Though she failed in the playoffs, after going 0–2 with a 4.50 ERA against the eventual champion Racine Belles. After the end of the season, she was selected for the All-Star Team and was honored as Pitcher of the Year.

In her sophomore 1944 season, Nicol went 17-11 and led again the league with a 0.93 ERA. In addition, she hurled a no hitter and four one-hitters. She went 2–3 with a 1.09 ERA while facing the Milwaukee Chicks in the playoffs, but lost three of four pitching matchups with Connie Wisniewski, including the crucial Game 6, 2–1, a 13 inning-duel won by Wisniewski. For the second consecutive year, she was named Pitcher of the Year.

In 1945, Nicol married and played under the name Helen Fox. She had another stellar season though the Comets finished in last place. She earned 24 of the 41 wins of her team, finishing fourth in ERA (1.34) and second in strikeouts (220) and innings (357). The next season, and for the first time, she fell under .500 of winning percentage (15-17) and missed the top 10 in wins.

In 1947, according to new regulations, the AAGPBL pitchers were forced to switch from underhand to sidearm, and both the bases and the mound were pushed back. Many underhand pitchers could not make it to the sidearm pitching, including Fox. She divided her playing time between Kenosha and Rockford, and posted a combined 6–16 with a 2.62 ERA. Nevertheless, in 1948 she stayed patient and made the necessary adjustments to pitch sidearm and overhand, as was required in that season. She rebounded with a 17–13 mark and a 2.61 ERA. After that, she won all four playoff games she pitched, including the pennant clinching victory, 4–2, over the Fort Wayne Daisies.

Fox rediscovered her previous form in 1949, going 13–8 with seven shutouts and a second-best 0.98 ERA, behind Lois Florreich (0.67) and over Jean Faut (1.10). She was 2–0 in the playoffs against the South Bend Blue Sox, to win her second straight championship with the Peaches. In 1950 she went 14–12 with a 1.98, helping her team to reach the playoffs. She finished 4–1, including the decisive Game 7 against the Daisies, 4–3, for her third consecutive championship title.

The 1951 season saw Fox continue to shine with Rockford, as she had an 18–7 record with a 2.57 ERA and 23 complete games in 214 innings. In her final 1952 season, she went 8-7 and an ERA of 2.50 to culminate a 10-season brilliant career.

Fox, and another 63 women who represented Canada in the AAGPBL, gained induction into the Canadian Baseball Hall of Fame in 1998.

== Sources ==
- All-American Girls Professional Baseball League Record Book – W. C. Madden. Publisher: McFarland & Company. Format: Paperback, 294pp. Language: English. ISBN 0-7864-3747-2 ISBN 9780786437474
