= All-American Girls Professional Baseball League =

League for women's baseball teams in the United States

- Sport: Women's baseball
- Founded: 1943 All-American Girls Professional Baseball League season (1943; 83 years ago)
- Founder: Philip K. Wrigley
- First season: 1943
- Folded: September 5, 1954; 71 years ago
- Motto: Do or die!
- No. of teams: 15
- Last champion: Kalamazoo Lassies
- Most titles: Rockford Peaches (4)
- Website: aagpbl.org

The All-American Girls Professional Baseball League (AAGPBL) was a professional women's baseball league founded by Philip K. Wrigley, which existed from 1943 to 1954. The AAGPBL is the forerunner of women's professional league sports in the United States. Over 600 women played in the league, which eventually consisted of 10 teams located in the American Midwest. In 1948, league attendance peaked at over 900,000 spectators. The most successful team, the Rockford Peaches, won a league-best four championships.

The 1992 film A League of Their Own and the 2022 television show of the same name are mostly fictionalized accounts of the league and its stars. Sixty-five original AAGPBL members appeared in scenes for the movie filmed in October 1991 recreating the induction of the league into the Baseball Hall of Fame in 1988.

== History ==
=== Founding ===
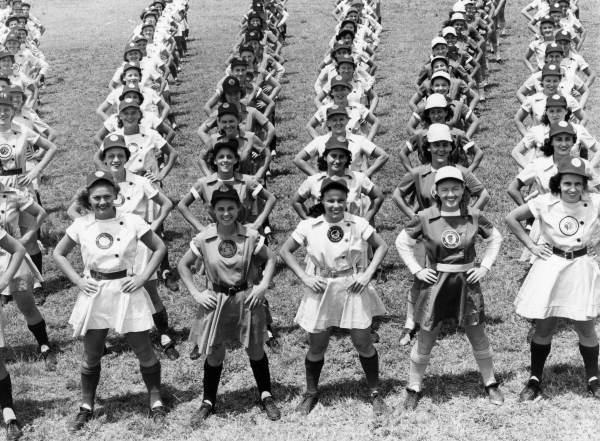
All-American Girls Professional Baseball League members performing calisthenics in Opa-locka, Florida, on April 22, 1948. The different baseball clubs are (L-R): Fort Wayne Daisies (partially visible), Chicago Colleens, Rockford Peaches, South Bend Blue Sox, Springfield Sallies and Peoria Redwings.

Although the AAGPBL was the first recorded professional women's baseball league, women had played baseball since the nineteenth century. The first known women's baseball team played at Vassar College in 1866, while there were several barnstorming Bloomer Girls teams (sometimes including men).

With the entry of the United States into World War II, several major league baseball executives started a new professional league with women players in order to maintain baseball in the public eye while the majority of able men were away. The founders included Philip K. Wrigley, Branch Rickey, and Paul V. Harper. They feared that Major League Baseball might even temporarily cease due to the war because of the loss of talent, as well as restrictions on team travel due to gasoline rationing.

The women's initial tryouts were held at Wrigley Field in Chicago. Scouted from amateur softball games across the country, over 200 women were invited to try out, and about 60 were selected for the league roster. Like the male major league, the 'girls' league was also informally segregated; thus, no African Americans were recruited or hired. Women were selected for their skilled play, but the player also needed to fit what was seen by marketers as a wholesome, feminine ideal. The first league game was played on May 30, 1943.

Scouts for the Chicago-based All-American Girls Professional Baseball League initially sought and recruited talent from the Chicago softball Metropolitan League, along with several others. However, after seeing many of their players leave for the AAGPBL, it was decided to then turn the amateur Metropolitan League to a professional league. The result was the creation of the six-team National Girls Baseball League, which began in 1944, composed entirely of Chicago-area teams. The National Girls baseball League was founded by Emery Parichy, Charles Bidwill (owner of the Chicago Cardinals football team) and politician Ed Kolski. Pirachy operated the Metropolitan League. Football star Red Grange was hired to preside over the league. As a local league with a limited geographical reach, the NGBL was much less publicized than the AAGPBL, but it paralleled the AAGPBL, as it also lasted until 1954 and drew up to 500,000 fans per season. For a time, the two leagues were involved in a strong rivalry for players, before meeting and agreeing to a poaching truce in 1946. Many players and several managers appeared in both leagues.

In the winter of 1952–1953, players from both the AAGPBL and National Girls Baseball League played together in the four–team International Girls Baseball League based in Miami, Florida.

=== Ownership and management ===
The All-American Girls Professional Baseball League went through three periods of ownership. It was owned by chewing gum mogul Wrigley from 1943 to 1945, wealthy publicist Arthur Meyerhoff from 1945 to 1951, and the teams were individually owned from 1951 to 1954. The teams generally played in Midwestern cities. The South Bend Blue Sox and the Rockford Peaches were the only two teams that stayed in their home cities for the full period of the AAGPBL's existence.

Baseball Hall of Fame members Max Carey and Jimmie Foxx managed teams in the AAGPBL. The character of Jimmy Dugan, played by Tom Hanks in A League of Their Own, was loosely based on Foxx's tenure in the league. However, several of his former AAGPBL players said that, unlike Hanks's character in the movie, Foxx was always gentlemanly around them.

=== Play ===
In the first season, the league played a game that was a hybrid of baseball and softball. The ball was 12 inches in circumference, the size of a regulation softball (regulation baseballs are 9 to 9 1/4 inches). The pitcher's mound was only forty feet from home plate, closer even than in regulation softball and much closer than the baseball distance of 60 feet, 6 inches. Pitchers threw underhand windmill, like in softball, and the distance between bases was 65 feet, five feet longer than in softball, but 25 feet shorter than in baseball. Major similarities between the AAGPBL and baseball included nine player teams and the use of a pitcher's mound (softball pitchers throw from flat ground). By 1948, the ball had shrunk to 10 3/8 inches, overhand pitching was allowed, and the mound was moved back to 50 feet. Over the history of the league, the rules continued to gradually approach those of baseball. By the final season in 1954, the ball was regulation baseball size, the mound was moved back to 60 feet, and the basepaths were extended to 85 feet (still five feet shorter than in regulation baseball). Teams were generally managed by men who knew competitive athletics and were former major league players, in part to demonstrate to fans that the league was serious.

Salaries were above average for women and ranged from $45–$85 (or $837–$1581 in 2025 dollars) a week during the first years of play, with some reaching $125 (or $1550 in 2025 dollars) per week in later years. The women's league generally went along with the men's late spring to early autumn season.

The uniforms worn by the female ballplayers consisted of a belted, short-sleeved tunic dress with a slight flare of the skirt. Rules stated that skirts were to be worn no more than six inches above the knee, but the regulation was most often ignored in order to facilitate running and fielding. A circular team logo was sewn on the front of each dress, and baseball caps featured elastic bands in the back so that they were one-size-fits-all.

During spring training, the girls were required to attend evening classes at Helena Rubinstein's charm school. The proper etiquette for every situation was taught, and every aspect of personal hygiene, mannerisms and dress code was presented to all of the players. In an effort to make each player as physically attractive as possible, each received a beauty kit and instructions on how to use it. As a part of the league's 'Rules of Conduct', the 'girls' were not permitted to have short hair, could not smoke or drink in public places, were not allowed to wear pants, and were required to wear lipstick at all times. Fines for not following the league's rules of conduct were five dollars for the first offense, ten for the second, and suspension for the third. In 1944, Josephine "JoJo" D'Angelo was fired for cutting her hair short. The women's contracts were much stricter about behavior than in the men's league, and each team was also assigned its own chaperone by the league.

=== Publicity ===
The AAGPBL received extensive publicity from its inception throughout the 1940s. The league was featured in national periodicals such as Time, Life, Seventeen, Newsweek and American Magazine, as well as in local city newspapers. Philip Wrigley, the league's founder, believed in the value of advertising, which may have contributed to the league's extensive exposure and marketing focus. Wrigley learned to appreciate advertising from his father, William Wrigley, who had success with his chewing-gum company in large part due to marketing methods. The league remained under Wrigley's advertising influence until 1951, when individual team directors took over the publicity.

The league's principal advertising agent was Arthur E. Meyerhoff, who handled the league's publicity from 1943 through 1950. Meyerhoff's promotional efforts focused on the value of national exposure in popular periodicals. These magazine articles attracted new fans and new players to the AAGPBL. The major publicity themes that characterized the league were "Recreation for War Workers", "Femininity", "Community Welfare", and "Family Entertainment".

The league shifted to decentralized league administration from 1951 to 1954. Thus, the responsibility was on individual team management to publicize and promote the teams. However, local managers were not always effective due to their lack of expertise in advertising. In the 1951 season, league president Fred Leo asked all team presidents to provide publicity on games and training events. Only one team complied with Fred Leo's request, which led to an early 1952 preseason board meeting to discuss inadequate promotion.

Due to the decentralized league administration, many of the promotion efforts from team management were aimed exclusively at local populaces. There were many promotional events with players, children's benefits, civic groups and holiday celebrations. Along with daily newspaper reports, the primary advertising strategy was radio broadcasts.

The AAGPBL peaked in attendance during the 1948 season, when 10 teams attracted 910,000 paid fans. The Rockford Peaches won the most league championships with four (1945, 1948, 1949 and 1950). The Milwaukee/Grand Rapids Chicks were second with three (1944 in Milwaukee and 1947 and 1953 in Grand Rapids). The Racine Belles (1943 and 1946) and the South Bend Blue Sox (1951 and 1952) each won two, and the Kalamazoo Lassies won in the league's final season (1954).

=== Closure ===
Once WWII ended, men returned to the workforce, which meant that men's sports became more prioritized again rather than women's sports. As attendance and revenues began to fall in the early 1950s, the league became less alluring to players, and some even returned to playing softball. Teams rapidly began to close down operations each year until, at the end of the 1954 season, only five teams remained, and the AAGPBL officially shut down and closed in 1954. During the AAGPBL's twelve-year operations, over 500 women were able to play baseball in a professional setting.

== Rules of play ==
Since the only organized ball for women in the United States was softball, the league officials created a hybrid game which included features of both fast-pitch softball and baseball. Compared to softball, the crucial differences were that nine (not ten) players were used, and runners could lead off, slide and steal bases.

In its twelve years of history the All-American Girls Professional Baseball League evolved through many stages. These differences varied from the beginning of the league, progressively extending the length of the base paths and pitching distance, while decreasing the size of the ball until the final year of play in 1954.

For the first five years the circuit used a fastpitch underhand motion, shifted to sidearm in the 1947 season, and overhand pitching began in 1948.

| Season | Ball circumference | Length of base paths | Pitching distance | Pitching style |
|---|---|---|---|---|
| 1943 | 12 in (300 mm) | 65 ft (20 m) | 40 ft (12 m) | Underhand |
| 1944 | 11 1/2 in (290 mm) (midseason) | 68 ft (21 m) (midseason) | 40 ft (12 m) | Underhand |
| 1945 | 11 1/2 in (290 mm) | 68 ft (21 m) | 42 ft (13 m) (midseason) | Underhand |
| 1946 | 11 in (280 mm) | 70 ft (21 m) | 43 ft (13 m) | Underhand (limited side-arm) |
| 1947 | 11 in (280 mm) | 70 ft (21 m) | 43 ft (13 m) | Side-arm |
| 1948 | 10 3/8 in (260 mm) | 72 ft (22 m) | 50 ft (15 m) | Overhand |
| 1949 | 10 in (250 mm) (red seam) | 72 ft (22 m) | 55 ft (17 m) (midseason) | Overhand |
| 1950 | 10 in (250 mm) (livelier) | 72 ft (22 m) | 55 ft (17 m) | Overhand |
| 1951 | 10 in (250 mm) (livelier) | 72 ft (22 m) | 55 ft (17 m) | Overhand |
| 1952 | 10 in (250 mm) (livelier) | 72 ft (22 m) | 55 ft (17 m) | Overhand |
| 1953 | 10 in (250 mm) | 75 ft (23 m) | 56 ft (17 m) | Overhand |
| 1954 | 9 in (230 mm) | 85 ft (26 m) | 60 ft (18 m) | Overhand |

== Uniforms ==
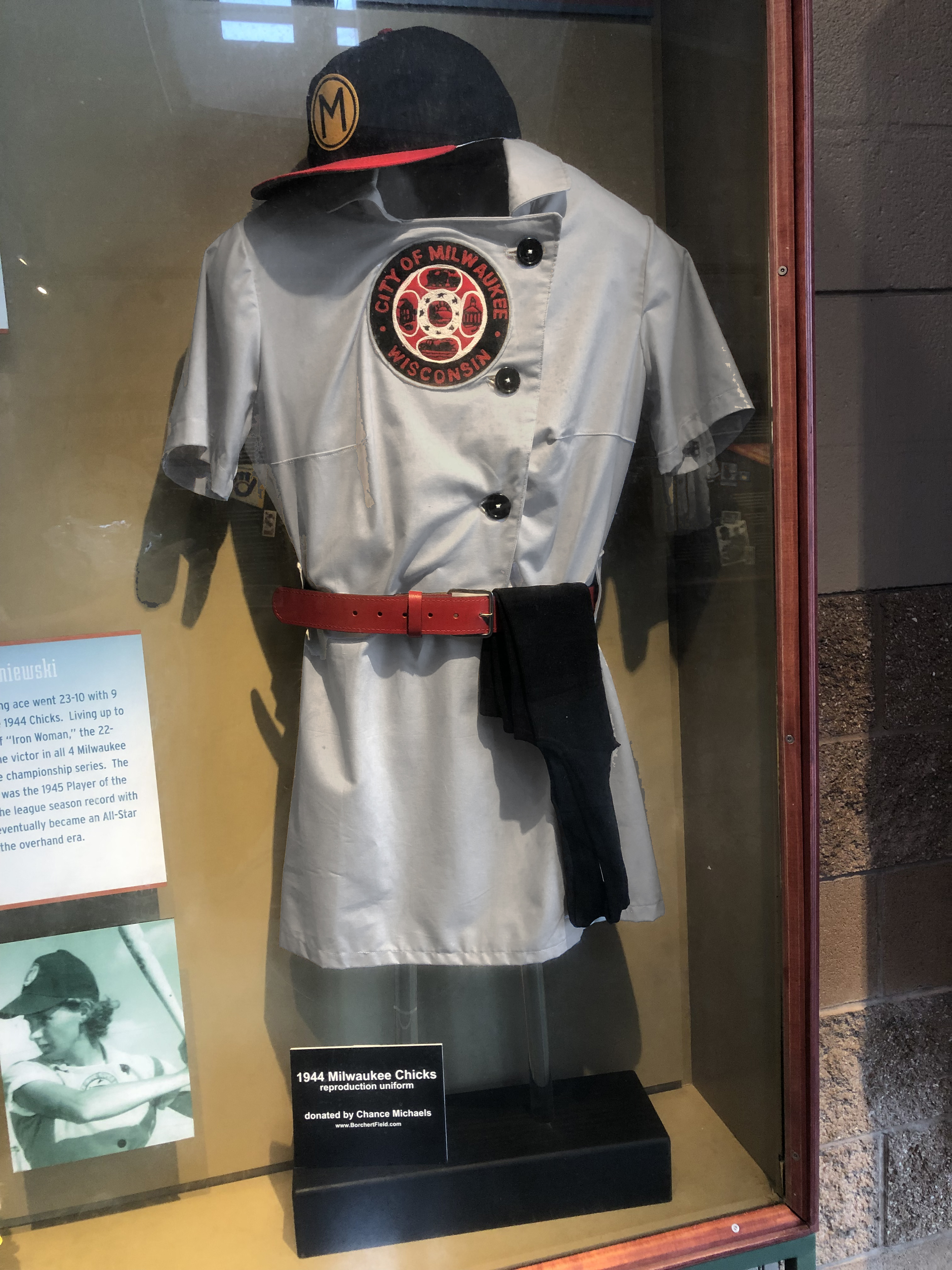
Reproduction 1944 Milwaukee Chicks uniform on display at American Family Field.

The uniform was a one-piece short-skirted flared tunic with a team patch in the center of the chest. The base uniform was designed by Wrigley Company art director Otis Shepard, assisted by Philip K. Wrigley's wife Helen Blanche (née Atwater) Wrigley and Chicago softball player Ann Harnett, the first player signed by the league. Shepard was also the longtime art director for the Chicago Cubs and spearheaded a series of innovative uniforms beginning in 1937. Shepard designed all visual elements of the league, including game scorecards and promotional materials. For his work on the AAGPBL and the Cubs, Shepard was called the "chief visualizer of mid-century baseball".

Shepard modeled the uniform after the figure skating, field hockey and tennis outfits of the period. The uniforms included satin shorts, knee-high baseball socks and a baseball cap. The team patches were modeled after each respective city's seal. The uniform was meant to display the player's feminine image; all masculine clothing was not allowed, both on the field and in public.

In the beginning, each team was issued one uniform style, to be worn in all games. Shepard unveiled the inaugural uniforms in a palette of pastel colors: green for Kenosha; yellow for Racine; blue for South Bend; and peach for Rockford. The accessories (cap, belt and stirrups) were bold, darker shades of the team color. As new teams were added, they were given a new distinctive team color (gray for Milwaukee, pink for Minneapolis). Road uniforms were introduced to the league starting with the 1948 season.

== Branding ==
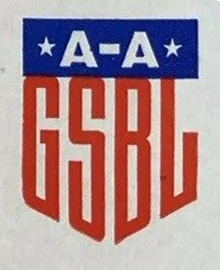
Logo of the All-American Girls Softball League, as scanned from a 1943 score card

The league went through a series of name changes during its history. It was founded as the All-American Girls Softball League, but, midway through its first season of 1943, the name was changed to the All-American Girls Baseball League (AAGBBL). After the 1943 season, the official League name was again changed, to the All-American Girls Professional Ball League (AAGPBL), reflecting that players were paid from the start and further separating it from existing amateur leagues. This name was used until the end of the 1945 season, when the league reverted to All-American Girls Baseball League (AAGBBL), which it would use through 1950. When teams were sold to independent owners at the end of the 1950 season, the official League name was changed to the American Girls Baseball League (AGBL), although it continued to be popularly identified as the All-American League or the All-American Girls Baseball League (AAGBBL). When the Players' Association was organized in 1986 and gained recognition from the National Baseball Hall of Fame in 1988, it was again, and finally, named All-American Girls Professional Baseball League (AAGPBL).

The theme song made famous in the 1992 film A League of Their Own was the official song of the All-American Girls Baseball League, co-written by Pepper Paire and Nalda Bird (although in the movie, the word "Irishmen" was changed to "Irish ones"). In their annual reunions since 1998, it is usual to hear the original AAGPBL players singing the song.

== Teams ==
=== Team timeline ===
- Kenosha Comets (1943–1951)
- Racine Belles (1943–1950)
- Rockford Peaches (1943–1954)
- South Bend Blue Sox (1943–1954)
- Milwaukee Chicks (1944)
- Minneapolis Millerettes (1944)
- Fort Wayne Daisies (1945–1954)
- Grand Rapids Chicks (1945–1954)
- Muskegon Lassies (1946–1949)
- Peoria Redwings (1946–1951)
- Chicago Colleens (1948)
- Springfield Sallies (1948)
- Kalamazoo Lassies (1950–1954)
- Battle Creek Belles (1951–1952)
- Muskegon Belles (1953)

== League champions ==
The League had twelve championship series, and six separate champion teams, in its time of play. For the 1943 and 1944 seasons, the playoffs were a matchup of the first half champion and the second half champion. The seasons of 1945–1947 matched four teams for its postseason. For 1948 only, four teams each from the Eastern and Western Division made the postseason. The 1949 season utilized a system where six teams reached the postseason, with the 1 and 3 seeds having a first-round bye (the 2 seed played the 1 seed). The 1950 season had four teams reach the postseason. The 1951 season returned to the half system, but with a caveat that the top two teams of the first and second half went to the playoffs. For the final three seasons (1952–1954), they had the top four teams reach the playoffs.

| * | First half / Second half champion / League pennant winner |

Overview of AAGPBL champions
| Year | Winning team | Winning manager | Series | Losing team |
|---|---|---|---|---|
| 1943 | Racine Belles | Johnny Gottselig | 3–0 | Kenosha Comets |
| 1944 | Milwaukee Chicks | Max Carey | 4–3 | Kenosha Comets |
| 1945 | Rockford Peaches | Bill Allington | 4–1 | Fort Wayne Daisies |
| 1946 | Racine Belles | Leo Murphy | 4–2 | Rockford Peaches |
| 1947 | Grand Rapids Chicks | Johnny Rawlings | 4–3 | Racine Belles |
| 1948 | Rockford Peaches | Bill Allington | 4–2 | Fort Wayne Daisies |
| 1949 | Rockford Peaches | Bill Allington | 3–1 | Grand Rapids Chicks |
| 1950 | Rockford Peaches | Bill Allington | 4–3 | Fort Wayne Daisies |
| 1951 | South Bend Blue Sox | Karl Winsch | 3–2 | Rockford Peaches |
| 1952 | South Bend Blue Sox | Karl Winsch | 3–2 | Rockford Peaches |
| 1953 | Grand Rapids Chicks | Woody English | 2–0 | Kalamazoo Lassies |
| 1954 | Kalamazoo Lassies | Mitch Skupien | 3–2 | Fort Wayne Daisies |

== Legacy ==
=== Media ===
The 1992 film A League of Their Own, although fictionalized, covers the founding and play of this league. Geena Davis, Lori Petty, Rosie O'Donnell, Madonna and Tom Hanks were the stars of the film, which was directed by Penny Marshall. A six-episode television series with the same name aired in 1993. In 2022, a second spin-off television series of the same name was released. The 2022 series shares a number of similarities to the film, but showrunner Abbi Jacobson notes that the series aims to portray a more authentic representation of the league. The television adaptation addresses homosexuality within the league, the reality of which has been discussed by former players. The series also addresses race relations at the time, taking on a split format which follows both the Peaches and Max Chapman—a fictional black pitcher who was barred from trying out for the league.

Lois Siegel documented the All-American Girls Professional Baseball League in her film Baseball Girls, which was produced by the National Film Board of Canada. Several histories of the AAGPBL have also been published in book form.

=== AAGPBL Players Association ===
When the All-American Girls Professional Baseball League was unable to continue in 1955, its history and its significance were forgotten by baseball historians. Many people in the 1950s thought that women were not supposed to play baseball, so most female athletes competed on other fields of endeavor. Finally, in 1980, former pitcher June Peppas launched a newsletter project to get in touch with friends, teammates, and opponents that resulted in the league's first reunion in Chicago, Illinois in 1982. The Players Association was formed after a 1986 Reunion held in Fort Wayne as part of Run, Jane, Run, a local Women's Bureau event. Historian and Baseball card publisher Sharon Roepke (author of Diamond Gals) who was circulating a petition to get the Baseball Hall of Fame to recognize the All American Girls Baseball League asked the players at the Reunion to organize to help the effort. A meeting was held at the South Bend home of Fran Janssen, and the Player's Association was born. June Peppas was nominated President. Membership is now offered to players, staff members, and descendants, in addition to associate memberships for baseball fans and historians.

Sixty-five original AAGPBL members appeared in the 1992 film A League of Their Own in scenes recreating the induction of the league into the Baseball Hall of Fame in 1988.

The President of the AAGPBL Players Association is Richard Chapman. He attended the 1982 reunion representing his mother Dorothy Maguire, who died in the prior year. In 2017, he told Baseball America, "When I went to the reunion in 1982 to represent her, I learned more about her playing than she had ever said. There is a lot of history getting lost."

In 2019, the Players' Association established American Girls Baseball, which promotes women's baseball for the World Baseball Softball Confederation Women's Baseball World Cup. American Girls Baseball, established by Sue (Parsons) Zipay, who played in the final two seasons of the league with Rockford in the 1953 and 1954 seasons, and Misdee Miller, granddaughter of AAGPBL founder Phillip Wrigley, first began the All-American Woman's Baseball Classic at Ed Smith Stadium, the spring training home of the Baltimore Orioles, in Sarasota, Florida during November in a tournament that began in 2022. The AGB tournament features four teams named as tributes for the original AAGPBL teams, with all teams using a progressive fade to white jersey based on the colors of the squad—Rockford (peach with red numerals), South Bend (light blue with dark blue numerals), Racine (gold with brown numerals), and Kenosha (light green with green numerals) and white trousers. Games are played to modern WBSC Women's Baseball rules, with all games seven innings long. Players must be 16 years of age to participate.

The 2025 Players Association Annual Meeting is scheduled for July 31 to August 3 at Durham Bulls Athletic Park in Durham, North Carolina, and will feature events with surviving players and descendants. In addition, the American Women's Baseball Classic will be part of the reunion for the first time.

== See also ==
- All-American Girls Professional Baseball League All-Star Team
- All-American Girls Professional Baseball League Player of the Year Award
- All-American Girls Professional Baseball League batting records
- All-American Girls Professional Baseball League fielding records
- All-American Girls Professional Baseball League pitching records
- List of All-American Girls Professional Baseball League players
- Ted Williams Museum and Hitters Hall of Fame, which includes an AAGPBL exhibit
- Major women's sport leagues in North America
- Women in baseball
- Toni Stone, Mamie Johnson, Connie Morgan (the only three black women to play in the Negro leagues)
