= List of All-American Girls Professional Baseball League players (S–Z) =

The following is a list of All-American Girls Professional Baseball League players who formed part of the circuit during its twelve years of existence.

== See also ==
- List of All-American Girls Professional Baseball League players (A–C)
- List of All-American Girls Professional Baseball League players (D–G)
- List of All-American Girls Professional Baseball League players (H–L)
- List of All-American Girls Professional Baseball League players (M–R)

== S ==
Name	Position(s)	Year(s)	Team(s)	Ref
Toni Sachetti	n/a	1954	Fort Wayne Daisies	
Shirley Salisbury	outfield	1953	South Bend Blue Sox	
Doris Sams	pitcher, outfield	1946–1953	Muskegon Lassies, Kalamazoo Lassies	
Sarah Jane Sands	right field, catcher	1953–1954	Rockford Peaches	
Dorothy Sarazen	n/a	1950	South Bend Blue Sox	
Doris Satterfield	left field, pitcher	1947–1953	Grand Rapids Chicks	
Dorothy Sawyer	n/a	1943	Rockford Peaches, South Bend Blue Sox	
Blanche Schachter	catcher	1948	Kenosha Comets	
Ellen Schallern	n/a	1946	Fort Wayne Daisies	
Joan Schatz	outfield	1950, 1952	Chicago Colleens, Kalamazoo Lassies	
Edna Scheer	pitcher	1950	Rockford Peaches	
Audrey Schenck	third base	1950	Chicago Colleens, Springfield Sallies	
Claire Schillace	center field	1943–1946	Racine Belles	
Marilyn Schmidt	catcher	1952	Rockford Peaches	
Violet Schmidt	pitcher	1946	South Bend Blue Sox, Rockford Peaches	
June Schofield	pitcher, infield	1948–1949	Springfield Sallies, Muskegon Lassies, Peoria Redwings	
Dorothy Schroeder	shortstop, pitcher	1943–1954	South Bend Blue Sox, Kenosha Comets, Fort Wayne Daisies, Kalamazoo Lassies	
Shirley Schulze	outfield	1944	Milwaukee Chicks	
Gloria Schweigerdt	pitcher	1950–1952	Chicago Colleens, Grand Rapids Chicks, Battle Creek Belles	
Pat Scott	pitcher	1948, 1951–1953	Springfield Sallies, Fort Wayne Daisies	
Delores Seigfried	second base	1947	Muskegon Lassies	
Lillian Shadic	center field	1949	Springfield Sallies	
Geraldine Shafranis	infield	1943	South Bend Blue Sox	
Mary Shastal	second base	1944	Milwaukee Chicks	
Mary Sheehan	outfield	1952	Battle Creek Belles	
Lois Sheffield	n/a	1952	South Bend Blue Sox	
Doris Shero	outfield	1950–1951	Racine Belles, Battle Creek Belles	
Dorothy Shinen	outfield	1945	Kenosha Comets	
Kay Shinen	third base	1945	Kenosha Comets	
Twila Shively	first base, outfield	1945–1950	Grand Rapids Chicks, Chicago Colleens, Peoria Redwings	
Fern Shollenberger	third base	1946–1954	Kenosha Comets, Kalamazoo Lassies	
Amy Shuman	first base	1946	Grand Rapids Chicks, South Bend Blue Sox	
Norma Sieg	n/a	1951	Battle Creek Belles	
Louise Simpson	n/a	1954	n/a	
Joan Sindelar	first base, outfield	1949–1953	Chicago Colleens, Kalamazoo Lassies	
Josephine Skokan	pitcher	1943	Rockford Peaches	
Frances Sloan	pinch-hitter	1946	Grand Rapids Chicks, Peoria Redwings	
Charlotte Smith	infield/outfield utility	1943–1944	Racine Belles	
Colleen Smith	third base	1949	Grand Rapids Chicks	
Hazel Smith	catcher	1951	Battle Creek Belles	
Helen Smith	utility	1946	Rockford Peaches	
Helen Smith	outfield	1947–1948	Kenosha Comets, Grand Rapids Chicks	
Jean Smith	center field, pitcher	1948–1954	Kenosha Comets, Fort Wayne Daisies, Peoria Redwings, Grand Rapids Chicks	
Marjean Smith	utility	1948	Grand Rapids Chicks	
Shirley Smith	outfield, second base	1947	Peoria Redwings	
Kay Sopkovic	utility	1945	South Bend Blue Sox	
Barbara Sowers	outfield	1953–1954	Muskegon Belles, Grand Rapids Chicks	
Donna Stageman	outfield, shortstop	1946	Peoria Redwings	
Adele Stahley	outfield	1947	Fort Wayne Daisies	
Elma Steck	outfield	1948–1950	Peoria Redwings, Rockford Peaches, Chicago Colleens, Springfield Sallies	
Joyce Steele	first base, center field	1953	Kalamazoo Lassies	
Margaret Stefani	second base	1943–1949	South Bend Blue Sox, Rockford Peaches	
Ruby Stephens	pitcher	1946–1951	Racine Belles, South Bend Blue Sox, Springfield Sallies, Kenosha Comets	
Emily Stevenson	catcher, outfield	1944	Milwaukee Chicks	
Rosemary Stevenson	outfield	1954	Grand Rapids Chicks	
Jeanette Stocker	catcher	1946	Kenosha Comets	
Jane Stoll	outfield	1946–1954	Peoria Redwings, Grand Rapids Chicks, Springfield Sallies, South Bend Blue Sox, Kalamazoo Lassies	
Dorothy Stolze	infield/outfield utility	1946–1952	Muskegon Lassies, Racine Belles, Peoria Redwings, Grand Rapids Chicks	
Lucille Stone	shortstop	1945	Racine Belles, South Bend Blue Sox	
Shirley Stovroff	catcher	1948–1952	South Bend Blue Sox, Springfield Sallies	
Ruby Stoykovich	backup catcher	1953	Grand Rapids Chicks	
Mary Lou Studnicka	pitcher, second base	1951–1953	Grand Rapids Chicks	
Beverly Stuhr	outfield	1949–1950	Peoria Redwings, Racine Belles	
Anne Surkowski	outfield	1945	South Bend Blue Sox	
Lee Surkowski *	outfield	1944–1946, 1948	South Bend Blue Sox, Rockford Peaches, Fort Wayne Daisies	
Shirley Sutherland	utility	1950–1951	Chicago Colleens, Grand Rapids Chicks	
Rella Swamp	n/a	1943	Rockford Peaches	
Mary Lou Swanagon	n/a	1946	Grand Rapids Chicks	

* Surkowski also played under her married name of Lee Delmonico.

== T ==
Name	Position(s)	Year(s)	Team(s)	Ref
Eunice Taylor	catcher	1950–1951	Chicago Colleens, Kenosha Comets	
Mary Taylor	outfield	1953–1954	Fort Wayne Daisies, Kalamazoo Lassies	
Norma Taylor	first base	1950	Fort Wayne Daisies	
Yolande Teillet	outfield	1945–1947	Fort Wayne Daisies, Grand Rapids Chicks, Kenosha Comets	
Georgia Terkowski	infield	1952–1953	Rockford Peaches	
Betty Terry	utility	1946	Peoria Redwings	
Barbara Tetro	n/a	1948	Grand Rapids Chicks	
Virginia Tezak	infield/outfield utility	1948	Racine Belles	
Doris Tetzlaff	third base	1944–1950	Milwaukee Chicks, Grand Rapids Chicks, Chicago Colleens, Fort Wayne Daisies, Muskegon Lassies	
Miss Thatcher	n/a	1951	Battle Creek Belles	
Erla Thomas	catcher	1944	Kenosha Comets	
Mava Lee Thomas	third base, catcher	1951	Fort Wayne Daisies	
Annebelle Thompson	pitcher	1943	Racine Belles	
Barbara Thompson	outfield	1951–1952	Rockford Peaches	
Viola Thompson	pitcher	1944–1947	Milwaukee Chicks, Grand Rapids Chicks, South Bend Blue Sox	
Gloria Tipton	pitcher	1946	Kenosha Comets	
Alice Tognatti	outfield	1946	Fort Wayne Daisies	
Lorraine Torrison	third base	1944	Minneapolis Millerettes	
Ina Dell Towers	outfield	1953	Grand Rapids Chicks	
Gene Travis	first base, outfield	1948	Rockford Peaches	
Betty Trezza	shortstop, center field	1944–1950	Minneapolis Millerettes, South Bend Blue Sox, Fort Wayne Daisies, Racine Belles	
Ellen Tronnier	outfield	1943	South Bend Blue Sox	
Betty Tucker	pitcher	1946–1949	Peoria Redwings, Fort Wayne Daisies, Rockford Peaches, Grand Rapids Chicks, Chicago Colleens	
Joan Tysver	pitcher	1950–1951	Grand Rapids Chicks, Rockford Peaches	

== V ==
Name	Position(s)	Year(s)	Team(s)	Ref
Dolly Vanderlip	pitcher	1952–1954	Fort Wayne Daisies, South Bend Blue Sox	
Virginia Ventura	first base	1951, 1953	Rockford Peaches	
Zonia Vialat	first base	1951, 1953	Springfield Sallies	
Marge Villa	second base, shortstop, catcher	1946–1950	Kenosha Comets	
Georgette Vincent *	pitcher	1947–1952, 1954	Racine Belles, South Bend Blue Sox	
Karen Violetta	infield	1953	Grand Rapids Chicks	
Kathryn Vonderau	catcher	1946–1953	Fort Wayne Daisies, Muskegon Lassies, Chicago Colleens, Peoria Redwings, Muskegon Belles	
Inez Voyce	first base	1946–1953	South Bend Blue Sox, Grand Rapids Chicks	
Frances Vukovich	pitcher	1950–1951	Chicago Colleens, Racine Belles	

* Vincent also played under her married name of Georgette Mooney.

== W ==
Name	Position(s)	Year(s)	Team(s)	Ref
Helen Waddell	outfield, infield	1949–1951	Springfield Sallies, Rockford Peaches, Battle Creek Belles	
Audrey Wagner	outfield	1943–1949	Kenosha Comets	
Betty Wagoner	outfield, pitcher	1948–1954	South Bend Blue Sox, Muskegon Lassies	
Martha Walker	pitcher	1943	Racine Belles	
Nellie Jean Walker	pinch-hitter	1945	South Bend Blue Sox	
Thelma Walmsley	n/a	1946	Racine Belles	
Mary Walter	n/a	1946	n/a	
Helen Walulik	outfield, pitcher, second base	1948–1950	Muskegon Lassies, Fort Wayne Daisies, Chicago Colleens, Kalamazoo Lassies	
Betty Wanless	third base	1953–1954	Grand Rapids Chicks, South Bend Blue Sox	
Betty Warfel	pitcher, infield	1948–1949	Rockford Peaches	
Nancy Warren	pitcher,	1946–1948, 1951–1952, 1954	Muskegon Lassies, Chicago Colleens, Peoria Redwings, Fort Wayne Daisies, Muskegon Belles, Kalamazoo Lassies	
Mildred Warwick	third base	1943–1944	Rockford Peaches	
Marion Watson	pitcher	1947	Muskegon Lassies	
Evelyn Wawryshyn	second base	1946–1951	Kenosha Comets, Muskegon Lassies, Springfield Sallies, Fort Wayne Daisies	
Jean Weaver	third base, outfield, pitcher	1951–1953	Fort Wayne Daisies	
Joanne Weaver	outfield, pitcher	1950–1954	Fort Wayne Daisies	
Mary Weddle	pitcher, infield/outfield utility	1954	Fort Wayne Daisies	
Rossey Weeks	catcher	1947	Rockford Peaches, Racine Belles	
Marie Wegman	second base, pitcher	1947–1950	Rockford Peaches, Fort Wayne Daisies, Muskegon Lassies, Grand Rapids Chicks	
Shirley Weierman	third base	1953–1954	Fort Wayne Daisies	
Margaret Wenzell	infield/outfield utility	1945–1953	Grand Rapids Chicks, Muskegon Lassies, Peoria Redwings, Fort Wayne Daisies, Springfield Sallies, Racine Belles, Kalamazoo Lassies, Battle Creek Belles, South Bend Blue Sox	
Helen Westerman	catcher	1943–1944	Kenosha Comets, Rockford Peaches	
Dorothy Whalen	catcher	1948	South Bend Blue Sox	
Vera Whiteman	second base	1946	Grand Rapids Chicks	
Betty Whiting	first base, outfield, catcher	1944–1952	Milwaukee Chicks, Grand Rapids Chicks, Fort Wayne Daisies, Chicago Colleens, South Bend Blue Sox, Kalamazoo Lassies, Battle Creek Belles	
Norma Whitney	second base	1949–1950	Chicago Colleens, South Bend Blue Sox	
Elizabeth Wicken	outfield	1945–1946	Grand Rapids Chicks, Muskegon Lassies	
Margaret Wigiser	outfield	1944–1946	Minneapolis Millerettes, Rockford Peaches	
Hazel Wildfong	pinch-hitter	1946	Rockford Peaches	
Janet Wiley	first base	1950–1953	Chicago Colleens, South Bend Blue Sox, Rockford Peaches	
Ruth Williams	pitcher	1947–1953	South Bend Blue Sox, Peoria Redwings, Kalamazoo Lassies	
Wilma Williams	infield/outfield utility	1953	Rockford Peaches	
Dolores Wilson	outfield	1947–1948	Peoria Redwings, Chicago Colleens	
Jean Wilson	n/a	1943	South Bend Blue Sox	
Verna Wilson	n/a	1946	Rockford Peaches	
Dorothy Wiltse *	pitcher	1944–1948, 1950	Minneapolis Millerettes, Fort Wayne Daisies	
Dorothy Wind	shortstop	1943–1944	Racine Belles	
Elsie Wingrove	outfield	1946–1947	Fort Wayne Daisies, Grand Rapids Chicks	
Alma Winkler	n/a	1949	n/a	
Laverne Winn	n/a	1950	n/a	
Miss Winslow	n/a	1953	South Bend Blue Sox	
Joanne Winter	pitcher	1943, 1946–1948, 1950	Racine Belles	
Senaida Wirth	shortstop, second base	1945–1951	South Bend Blue Sox	
Connie Wisniewski	pitcher, outfield	1944–1949, 1951–1952	Milwaukee Chicks, Grand Rapids Chicks	
Marian Wohlwender	catcher	1943	Kenosha Comets	
Mary Wood	outfield	1946–1947	Peoria Redwings	
Trois Wood	pitcher	1950–1951	Fort Wayne Daisies, Kenosha Comets	
Sadie Wright	infield/outfield utility	1951	Battle Creek Belles	
Sylvia Wronski	pitcher	1944–1945	Milwaukee Chicks, Grand Rapids Chicks	
Lorraine Wuethrich	infield utility	1943–1944	Rockford Peaches	

* Wiltse also played under her married name of Dorothy Collins.

== Y ==
Name	Position(s)	Year(s)	Team(s)	Ref
Betty Yahr	right field	1946	Rockford Peaches	
Renae Youngberg	third base	1949–1954	Springfield Sallies, Grand Rapids Chicks, Muskegon Lassies, South Bend Blue Sox	
Janet Young	pitcher	1951	Battle Creek Belles	
Lois Youngen	catcher, third base	1951–1954	Kenosha Comets, Fort Wayne Daisies, South Bend Blue Sox	

== Z ==
Name	Position(s)	Year(s)	Team(s)	Ref
Clara Zaph	n/a	1943	n/a	
Marie Zeigler	utility	1953	Grand Rapids Chicks	
Alma Ziegler	second base, pitcher, shortstop	1944–1954	Milwaukee Chicks, Grand Rapids Chicks	
Frances Ziermak	pitcher	1951	Peoria Redwings	
Agnes Zurowski	pitcher	1945	Racine Belles, Fort Wayne Daisies	
