= Charlene Barnett =

American baseball player

- Infielder
- Born: March 13, 1928; Elgin, Illinois, U.S.
- Died: January 25, 1979 (aged 50); Elgin, Illinois, U.S.
- Batted: Right Threw: Right

Teams
- Grand Rapids Chicks (1947); Chicago Colleens (1948); Rockford Peaches (1949–1950)

Career highlights and awards
- Three-time championship team (1947, 1949–1950); Women in Baseball – AAGPBL Permanent Display at Baseball Hall of Fame and Museum (1988)

Charlene Barnett ("Barney") (March 13, 1928 – January 25, 1979) was an infielder who played from 1947 through 1950 in the All-American Girls Professional Baseball League (AAGPBL). She batted and threw right-handed.

Born in Elgin, Illinois, Charlene Barnett filled a consistent role during her four seasons in the All-American Girls Professional Baseball League. A three-time champion team member, she was a versatile infielder, playing mainly at second base, while adding deep defense at third base and shortstop. Considered a light hitter, she combined her usual brilliant defense with a decent bit of offense for a hitter placed at bottom of the batting order.

Barnett entered the league in 1947 with the Grand Rapids Chicks, playing for them one year. She hit a .115 batting average as a rookie, appearing in 33 games as a backup for Alma Ziegler (2B), Ernestine Petras (3B) and Doris Tetzlaff (SS). Grand Rapids, managed by Johnny Rawlings, defeated the South Bend Blue Sox in the first round of the playoffs, three games to two, and disposed of the Racine Belles in the final series, four games to three, to claim the champion title.

Unfortunately, Barnett opened 1948 with the Chicago Colleens, as the league shifted players as needed to help some teams stay afloat. The Colleens, managed by experimented Dave Bancroft, were the worst in the strong Eastern Division, getting roughed up as a last-place expansion club with a 47–76 record, ending twenty nine and a half games out of the first place spot. Barnett was a regular at second base, appearing in a career-high 106 games, while batting .165 with a .941 fielding average. As a result, from 1949 through 1950 the Colleens became a rookie development team that played exclusively exhibition games.

Then Barnett found herself on the move again, but this time she found a most positive environment after joining the Rockford Peaches from 1949 to 1950. With Bill Allington at the helm, the Peaches were the most successful team in league history, winning four championships titles in twelve seasons, including three in a row between 1948 and 1950.

In 1949, Barnett played at second base for Rockford as part of a good-defense infield that included Dorothy Kamenshek (1B), Dorothy Harrell (3B) and Alice Pollitt (SS). She executed 36 double plays, while committing only 20 errors in 448 fielding chances for a solid .955 fielding average. In 104 games, she batted .159 and stole 30 bases, driving in 13 runs while scoring 37 times.

In that season, Rockford pitchers Lois Florreich (0.67) and Helen Fox (0.98) allowed less than one earned run per each nine innings, while the Peaches had a high powered offense led by outfielders Eleanor Callow and Rose Gacioch and first sacker Kamenshek. Rockford swept South Bend in the best-of-seven first round, and defeated Grand Rapids in the best-of-five final round, three games to one, to clinch the championship.

In 1950, Barnett continued to provide good services during her last season, when she posted a career-high batting average (.221) and managed his usual defensive work rate (.943). First place Rockford beat the Kenosha Comets in the first round, three games to one, and followed the next step. The journey became a tough one.

In the final best-of-seven series, Rockford battled with the Fort Wayne Daisies throughout the tournament. After victories of Rockford in the first two games (3–1 and 7–2), Fort Wayne tied the series (7–3). Rockford responded by winning Game 5 (4–3), while the last two contests were blowouts with Fort Wayne winning Game 6 (8–0) and Rockford taking Game 7 (11–0) to win the championship. Fox won three of these games, including a shutout in the final game. In the series, Barnett combined for a .333 average (9-for-33) with four RBI and four runs in 11 games, committing just two errors in 40 chances (.950).

Following her baseball career, Barnett became a flight attendant.

In 1988, nine years after her death at age 50, Charlene Barnett became part of Women in Baseball, a permanent display based at the Baseball Hall of Fame and Museum in Cooperstown, New York, which was unveiled to honor the entire All-American Girls Professional Baseball League.

== Career statistics ==
Batting

| GP | AB | R | H | 2B | 3B | HR | RBI | SB | TB | BB | SO | BA | OBP | SLG |
|---|---|---|---|---|---|---|---|---|---|---|---|---|---|---|
| 355 | 1216 | 120 | 213 | 16 | 7 | 1 | 85 | 89 | 246 | 144 | 128 | .175 | .262 | .202 |

Fielding

| GP | PO | A | E | TC | DP | FA |
|---|---|---|---|---|---|---|
| 349 | 725 | 657 | 84 | 1466 | 104 | .943 |
