= Chicago Colleens =

- (1948); Chicago, Illinois
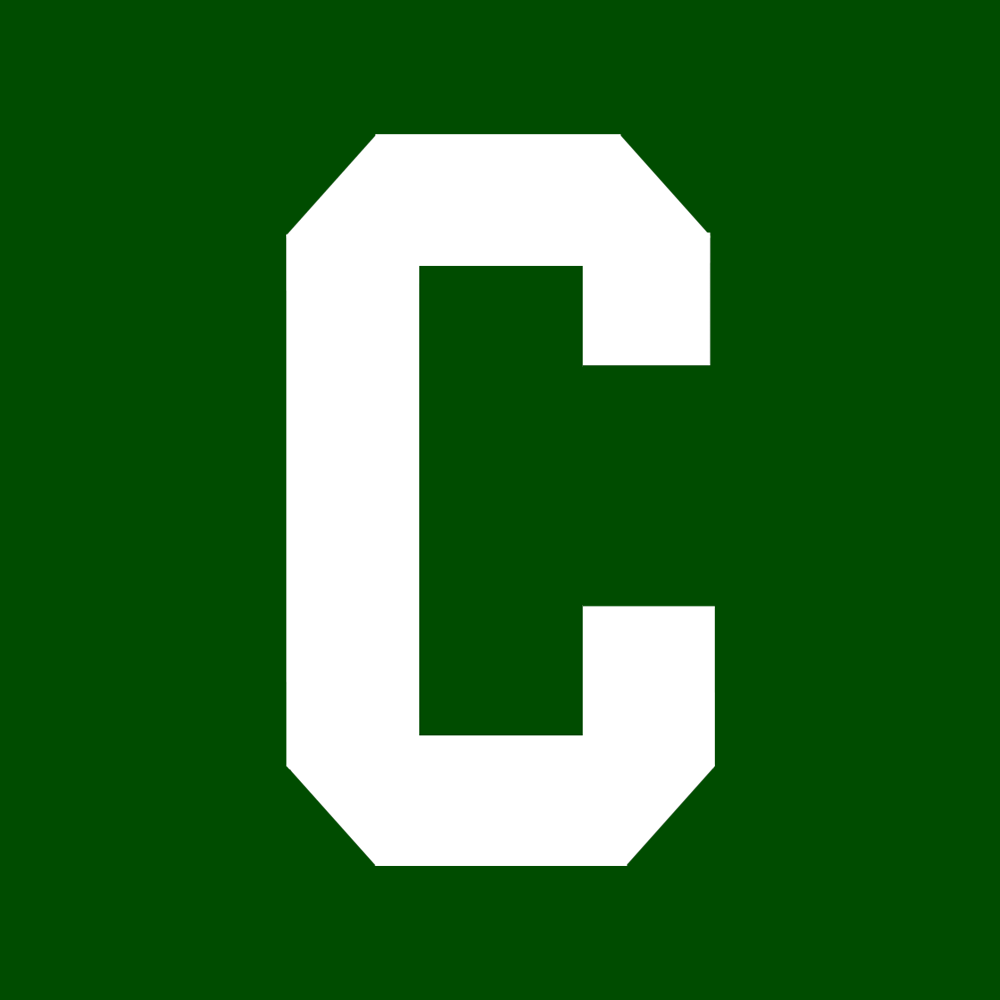

Minor league affiliations
- Previous leagues: All-American Girls Professional Baseball League

Team data
- Colors: Green, white
- Previous parks: Shewbridge Field
- Owner/ Operator: AAGPBL

1948 Chicago Colleens Front row, L-R: Doris Tetzlaff, Charlene Barnett, Betty Whiting, Marilyn Olinger, Beulah Anne Georges. Eileen Albright, Rita Briggs. Second row, L-R: Donna Cook, Betty Tucker, Dave Bancroft (manager), Mirtha Marrero, Migdalia Pérez. Back row, L-R: Kathryn Vonderau, Josephine Kabick, Eleanor Callow, Dolores Wilson, Dorice Reid, Margaret Johnson (chaperone).

The Chicago Colleens were a women's professional baseball team who played in the All-American Girls Professional Baseball League (AAGPBL) from 1948 to 1951, evolving into a development team. The team was based Chicago, Illinois, and played their home games at Shewbridge Field.

== History ==
The Colleens joined the strong Eastern Division in the 1948 season and were managed by former Major League player Dave Bancroft. The team was the worst in the league, getting roughed up as a last-place expansion club with a 47–76 record, ending twenty nine and a half games out of the first place spot in the division. The only team to do worse, the Springfield Sallies of the Western Division, ended 41–84 in last place, 35.5 games out of 1st place. Both teams lost their franchises by the end of that season.

From 1949 through 1950, the Colleens and the Sallies became rookie development teams that played exclusively exhibition games. Their tours included contests at Griffith Stadium and Yankee Stadium. The team dissolved entirely by 1951.

AAGPBL executive Mitch Skupien, who later managed in the league, served as the general manager for both touring teams.

The team's 1948 games were broadcast regularly on television station WBKB in Chicago.

== The ballpark ==
The Colleens played at Shewbridge Field. The ballpark was located at the corner of South Morgan and West 74th Streets on the South Side of Chicago, now part of the campus of the Stagg School of Excellence.

== All-time roster ==
- Isabel Álvarez
- Eileen Albright
- Gertrude Alderfer
- Charlene Barnett
- Patricia Barringer
- Fern Battaglia
- Mary Baumgartner
- Betty Bays
- Lois Bellman
- Barbara Berger
- Rita Briggs
- Patricia Brown
- Shirley Burkovich
- Eleanor Callow
- Isora Castillo
- Ann Cindric
- Donna Cook
- Patricia Courtney
- Shirley Danz
- Audrey Deemer
- Betty Francis
- Beulah Anne Georges
- Beverly Hatzell
- Florence Hay
- Dorothy Healy
- Frances Janssen
- Marilyn Jones
- Jacquelyn Kelley
- Arlene Kotil
- Irene Kotowicz
- Betty Luna
- Mirtha Marrero
- Theda Marshall
- Naomi Meier
- Ruth Middleton
- Jane Moffet
- Eleanor Moore
- Esther Morrison
- Nancy Mudge
- Dolly Niemiec
- Anna Mae O'Dowd
- Marilyn Olinger
- Toni Palermo
- Barbara Parks
- Migdalia Pérez
- Ernestine Petras
- Marjorie Pieper
- Dorice Reid
- Jenny Romatowski
- Martha Rommelaere
- Terry Rukavina
- Joan Schatz
- Audrey Schenck
- Gloria Schweigerdt
- Twila Shively
- Joan Sindelar
- Elma Steck
- Shirley Sutherland
- Eunice Taylor
- Doris Tetzlaff
- Betty Tucker
- Kathryn Vonderau
- Frances Vukovich
- Helen Walulik
- Nancy Warren
- Betty Whiting
- Norma Whitney
- Janet Wiley
- Dolores Wilson

Manager

- Dave Bancroft, 1948

Manager–Chaperone

- Patricia Barringer, 1949, 1950

Chaperone

- Margaret Johnson, 1948

== Sources ==
- All-American Girls Professional Baseball League history
- All-American Girls Professional Baseball League official website – Chicago Colleens seasons
- All-American Girls Professional Baseball League official website – Manager/Player profile search results
- All-American Girls Professional Baseball League Record Book – W. C. Madden. Publisher: McFarland & Company, 2000. Format: Hardcover, 294pp. Language: English. ISBN 0-7864-0597-X
- The Women of the All-American Girls Professional Baseball League: A Biographical Dictionary – W. C. Madden. Publisher: McFarland & Company, 2005. Format: Softcover, 295 pp. Language: English. ISBN 978-0-7864-2263-0
- Golden Age Era Sports
- Margaret Johnson profile
