= List of athletes from Chicago =

Flag of Chicago

The following list includes notable athletes who were born or raised in Chicago, Illinois.

== Baseball ==
Name	Image	Birth	Death	Known for	Association	Reference
Doe Boyland		Jan 6, 1955		Major League Baseball player	Born in Chicago	
Cesar Carrillo		Apr 29, 1984		MLB player	Born in Chicago	
Charles Comiskey		Aug 15, 1859	Oct 26, 1931	MLB player and team owner, namesake of Comiskey Park	Born in Chicago	
Josephine D'Angelo		Nov 23, 1924	Aug 18, 2013	All-American Girls Professional Baseball League player	Born in Chicago	
Irene DeLaby		Aug 12, 1922	Oct 6, 2012	All-American Girls Professional Baseball League player	Born in Chicago	
Dave Dombrowski		Jul 27, 1956		Baseball executive	Born in Chicago	
Sal Fasano		Aug 10, 1971		Former MLB player, currently catching coach for the Atlanta Braves	Born in Chicago	
Chick Fraser		Aug 26, 1873	May 8, 1940	MLB player	Born in Chicago	
Barbara Gates		May 4, 1934	Dec 1, 2000	All-American Girls Professional Baseball League player	Born in Chicago	
Philomena Gianfrancisco		Apr 20, 1923	Jan 10, 1992	All-American Girls Professional Baseball League player	Born in Chicago	
Florence Hay			May 24, 1982	All-American Girls Professional Baseball League player	Born in Chicago	
Arlene Kotil		May 22, 1934	Jul 10, 2014	All-American Girls Professional Baseball League player	Born in Chicago	
Irene Kotowicz		Dec 10, 1919	Jan 24, 2002	All-American Girls Professional Baseball League player	Born in Chicago	
Herman Long		Apr 13, 1866	Sep 17, 1909	MLB player and minor league manager	Born in Chicago	
Alex McCarthy		May 12, 1889	Mar 12, 1978	MLB player	Born in Chicago	
Owen Murphy		Sep 27, 2003		MLB player	Born in Chicago	
Wally Pipp		Feb 17, 1893	Jan 11, 1965	First baseman for the Detroit Tigers (1913), New York Yankees (1915–1925), and Cincinnati Reds; World Series champion (1923); American League home run champion (1916, 1917; 1926–1928)	Born in Chicago	
Kirby Puckett		Mar 14, 1960	Mar 6, 2006	MLB player, MLB Hall of Famer	Born in Chicago	
Larry Rothschild		Mar 12, 1954		Major League Baseball pitcher and coach	Born in Chicago	
Gloria Schweigerdt		Jun 10, 1934		All-American Girls Professional Baseball League player	Born in Chicago	
Alek Thomas		April 28, 2000		Major League Baseball player	Born in Chicago	
Stan Wasiak		Apr 8, 1920	Nov 20, 1992	Minor league manager, King of Baseball	Born in Chicago	
Phil Weintraub		Oct 12, 1907	Jun 21, 1987	Major League Baseball first baseman & outfielder; 11 RBIs in one game	Born in Chicago	

== Basketball ==
Name	Image	Birth	Death	Known for	Association	Reference
Rashaun Agee		Nov 2, 2000		College basketball power forward	Born in Chicago	
Nick Anderson		Jan 20, 1968		NBA guard	Born in Chicago	
Amari Bailey		Feb 17, 2004		NBA guard	Born in Chicago	
Patrick Beverley		Jul 12, 1988		NBA and Israeli Basketball Premier League player	Born in Chicago	
Will Bynum		Jan 4, 1983		NBA and Israel Basketball Premier League player	Born in Chicago	
Anthony Davis		Mar 11, 1993		NBA player	Born in Chicago	
Gene Dyker		Feb 17, 1930	Jan 1, 1966	NBA player		
Larry Friend		Apr 14, 1935	Feb 27, 1998	NBA player	Born in Chicago	
Tim Hardaway		Sep 1, 1966		NBA player	Born in Chicago	
Juwan Howard		Feb 7, 1973		NBA player	Born in Chicago	
Johnny Kerr		Jul 17, 1932	Feb 26, 2009	NBA player	Born in Chicago	
Mike Krzyzewski		Feb 13, 1947		Basketball coach and player; coach at Duke University, known as "Coach K"	Born in Chicago	
Walt Lemon Jr.		Jul 26, 1992		NBA player	Born in Chicago	
Gabe Levin		Aug 2, 1994		Israeli Basketball Premier League player	Born in Chicago	
Ray Meyer		Dec 18, 1913	Mar 17, 2006	Men's basketball coach at DePaul University	Born in Chicago	
George Mikan		Jun 18, 1924	Jun 1, 2005	NBA player, NBA Hall of Famer	Attended Quigley Prep in Chicago	
Nazr Mohammed		Sep 5, 1977		NBA player	Born in Chicago	
Aneesah Morrow		Feb 2, 2003		WNBA player	Born in Chicago	
Jabari Parker		Mar 15, 1995		NBA player	Born in Chicago	
Jack Phelan		Nov 6, 1925	Mar 20, 2021	NBA player	Born in Chicago	
Cappie Pondexter		Jan 7, 1983		WNBA player; Olympic gold medalist (Beijing 2008)	Raised in Chicago	
Quentin Richardson		Apr 13, 1980		NBA player	Born in Chicago	
Doc Rivers		Oct 13, 1961		NBA player and coach	Born in Chicago	
Derrick Rose		Oct 4, 1988		NBA player, 2011 NBA MVP	Born in Chicago	
Isiah Thomas		Apr 30, 1961		NBA player, NBA Hall of Famer	Born in Chicago	
Dwyane Wade		Jan 17, 1982		NBA player	Born in Chicago	
Antoine Walker		Aug 12, 1976		NBA player	Born in Chicago	

== Boxing ==
Name	Image	Birth	Death	Known for	Association	Reference
Jesús Chávez		Nov 12, 1972		World boxing champion	Raised in Chicago	

== Football ==
Name	Image	Birth	Death	Known for	Association	Reference
Flozell Adams		May 18, 1975		NFL offensive lineman	Born in Chicago	
Norm Amundsen		Sep 28, 1932		NFL guard	Born in Chicago	
Jason Avant		Apr 20, 1983		NFL wide receiver	Born in Chicago	
Dick Barwegan		Dec 25, 1921	Sep 3, 1966	NFL offensive lineman	Born in Chicago	
Tom Baugh		Dec 1, 1963		NFL center	Born in Chicago	
Ed Bell		Sep 20, 1921	Dec 6, 1990	NFL guard and tackle	Born in Chicago	
Harold Bradley Jr.		Oct 13, 1929		NFL offensive guard, singer of spirituals and blues; painter, actor, TV host, part of first African-American father-son duo in NFL history	Born in Chicago	
Harold Bradley Sr.		Sept 7, 1905	Nov 30, 1973	Second black lineman, part of first African-American father-son duo in NFL history	Raised and died in Chicago	
Dick Butkus		Dec 9, 1942	Oct 5, 2023	NFL linebacker, Hall of Fame linebacker for the Bears	Born in Chicago	
Bill Callahan		Jul 31, 1956		Offensive coordinator and offensive line coach for the Dallas Cowboys	Born in Chicago	
Larry Canada		Dec 16, 1954		NFL running back	Born in Chicago	
Leo Cantor		Feb 28, 1919	Jun 4, 1995	NFL running back	Born in Chicago	
Joe Carey		Nov 14, 1895		NFL guard and tackle	Born in Chicago	
Sean Cattouse		Oct 4, 1988		NFL safety	Born in Chicago	
Steve Collier		Apr 19, 1963		NFL offensive tackle	Born in Chicago	
Larry Coutre		Apr 11, 1928	May 19, 2008	NFL halfback	Born in Chicago	
Dick Evans		May 31, 1917	May 26, 2008	NFL player	Born in Chicago	
Fred Evans		Nov 6, 1983		Defensive tackle for the Minnesota Vikings and Miami Dolphins	Born in Chicago	
Dick Fencl		Feb 24, 1909	Jun 25, 1972	NFL end	Born in Chicago	
Tom Finnin		Sep 28, 1927		NFL defensive tackle	Born in Chicago	
Ray Frankowski		Sep 14, 1919	Nov 27, 2001	NFL guard	Born in Chicago	
Chuck Gelatka		Jan 28, 1914	May 23, 2001	NFL end	Born in Chicago	
George Halas		Feb 2, 1895	Oct 31, 1983	Coach and owner of the Bears		
Napoleon Harris		Feb 25, 1979		NFL linebacker	Born in Chicago	
Arnold Horween		Jul 7, 1898	Aug 5, 1985	Harvard Crimson All American football player and NFL football player	Born in Chicago	
Ralph Horween		Aug 3, 1896	May 26, 1997	Harvard Crimson All American football player and NFL football player	Born in Chicago	
Tony Ippolito		Sep 19, 1917	Nov 12, 1951	NFL guard	Born in Chicago	
Clarence Janecek		Apr 1, 1911	Jan 16, 1990	NFL offensive guard	Born in Chicago	
Johnny Karras		Jan 29, 1928		NFL halfback	Born in Chicago	
John Kenerson		Mar 18, 1938	Dec 6, 1995	NFL, AFL and CFL player	Born in Chicago	
John Kropke		Jan 3, 1966		CFL defensive lineman	Born in Chicago	
Larry Lauer		Aug 27, 1927		NFL center	Born in Chicago	
Marv Levy		Aug 3, 1925		Coach of Kansas City Chiefs and Buffalo Bills and the Chicago Blitz of the USFL, Pro Football Hall of Fame inductee	Born in Chicago	
Marc May		Jan 1, 1956		NFL tight end	Born in Chicago	
John McGarry		Nov 24, 1963		NFL guard	Born in Chicago	
Donovan McNabb		Nov 25, 1976		NFL quarterback, current analyst on NFL Network and Fox Sports	Born in Chicago	
Ahmad Merritt		Feb 5, 1977		NFL player	Born in Chicago	
John Meyer		Feb 20, 1942		NFL player and coach	Born in Chicago	
Ed Mieszkowski		Oct 14, 1925	Feb 15, 2004	AAFC tackle	Born in Chicago	
Nate Ollie		Jan 8, 1992		NFL coach	Born in Chicago	
Bill O'Neill		Apr 25, 1910	Oct 27, 2000	NFL back for the Detroit Lions and Cleveland Rams	Born in Chicago	
David Petway		Oct 17, 1955		NFL defensive back	Born in Chicago	
Jim Psaltis		Dec 14, 1927		NFL defensive back	Born in Chicago	
Simeon Rice		Feb 24, 1974		NFL defensive end	Born in Chicago	
Knute Rockne		Mar 4, 1888	Mar 31, 1931	Football player and coach at Notre Dame	Grew up in the Logan Square area of Chicago	
George Schmidt		Oct 28, 1927		NFL defensive end	Born in Chicago	
Tony Simmons		Dec 8, 1974		NFL player, CFL player	Born in Chicago	
Joe Skibinski		Dec 23, 1928		NFL guard	Born in Chicago	
Ed Skoronski		Oct 15, 1910	Dec 22, 1996	NFL player	Born in Chicago	
John Spilis		Oct 14, 1947		NFL wide receiver	Born in Chicago	
Jimmy Tays		Mar 10, 1899	Jun 21, 1986	NFL player	Born in Chicago	
Pierre Thomas		Dec 18, 1984		NFL running back, current running back for the New Orleans Saints	Born in Chicago	
Chuck Ulrich		Dec 14, 1929	Apr 10, 2006	Defensive tackle for the Chicago Cardinals	Born in Chicago	
Lou Usher			Jan 1, 1927	NFL offensive lineman for the Bears	Born in Chicago	
Joe Vodicka		Mar 4, 1921	Feb 28, 1995	NFL halfback	Born in Chicago	
Marty Wendell		Nov 22, 1926	Mar 7, 2012	Guard	Born in Chicago	
Ken Wendt		Jan 29, 1910	Jan 19, 1982	NFL guard	Born in Chicago	
Chuck Winfrey		Mar 27, 1949		NFL linebacker	Born in Chicago	
Chet Winters		Oct 22, 1960		NFL running back	Born in Chicago	
Harry Wunsch		Nov 20, 1910		NFL guard	Born in Chicago	
Joe Young		Aug 3, 1933		Defensive end in the AFL	Born in Chicago	
Bob Zimny		Dec 11, 1921	Aug 11, 2011	NFL tackle	Born in Chicago	

== Golf ==
Name	Image	Birth	Death	Known for	Association	Reference
Lucia Mida		1890	1960	Winner of the 1930 Women's Western Open	Born in Chicago	

== Gymnastics ==
Name	Image	Birth	Death	Known for	Association	Reference
Bart Conner		Mar 28, 1958		Olympic gymnastic gold medalist (1984)	Raised in Chicago	
Philip Erenberg		1909	1992	Gymnast and Olympic silver medalist		

== Hockey ==
Name	Image	Birth	Death	Known for	Association	Reference
Chris Chelios		Jan 25, 1962		NHL defenseman	Born in Chicago	
Christian Fischer		April 15, 1997		NHL forward	Born in Chicago	
John Hayden		Feb 14, 1995		NHL forward	Born in Chicago	
Al Montoya		Feb 13, 1995		NHL goalie	Born in Chicago	
Eddie Olczyk		Aug 16, 1966		NHL player and color commentator	Born in Chicago	

== Ice skating ==
Name	Image	Birth	Death	Known for	Association	Reference
Shani Davis		Aug 13, 1982		Olympic speed skater	Born in Chicago	
Dorothy Hamill		Jul 26, 1956		Figure skater, 1976 Olympic champion and 1976 World champion	Born in Chicago	
Emery Lehman		Jun 13, 1996		Olympic speed skater	Born in Chicago	
Evan Lysacek		Jun 4, 1985		Figure skater, 2010 Olympic champion and 2009 World champion	Born in Chicago	
Janet Lynn		Apr 6, 1953		Figure skater, 1972 Olympic bronze medalist and two-time world medalist	Born in Chicago	

== Martial arts ==
Name	Image	Birth	Death	Known for	Association	Reference
Irwin Cohen		Jan 21, 1952	Aug 27, 2012	Olympic judoka	Born in Chicago	
Steve Cohen		Aug 29, 1955		Olympic judoka	Born in Chicago	
Brian Gassaway		Aug 7, 1972	Oct 16, 2021	Mixed martial artist; UFC, Bellator, WEC and Pancrase veteran, later a coach at Chicago Mixed Martial Arts	Fought out of Chicago; died in Chicago	
James Chico Hernandez (a.k.a., "Chico")		Apr 14, 1954		Sambo practitioner; member of the USA National Team	Born in Chicago	
Andrew Tate		Dec 14, 1986		Former two-time world champion mixed martial artist	Born in Chicago	

== NASCAR ==
Name	Image	Birth	Death	Known for	Association	Reference
Bobby Dotter		Jul 11, 1960		NASCAR driver turned owner	Born in Chicago	

== Rowing and yachting ==
Name	Image	Birth	Death	Known for	Association	Reference
Robert Halperin		Jan 26, 1908	May 8, 1985	Olympic and Pan American Games yachting medalist; quarterback for the Brooklyn Dodgers; decorated World War II US-Navy sailor; co-founder of Lands' End; chairman of Commercial Light Company	Born in Chicago	
Donald Spero		Aug 9, 1939		Physicist; venture capitalist; European Rowing Championships bronze medalist and Olympic rower (1964)		

== Soccer ==
Name	Image	Birth	Death	Known for	Association	Reference
Andrew Akindele		Jan 11, 2000		Forward	Born in Chicago	
Marcelo Balboa		Aug 8, 1967		Defender, captain of the United States men's national soccer team, and National Soccer Hall of Fame inductee	Born in Chicago	
Victor Bezerra		Feb 5, 2000		Forward	Born in Chicago	
Michael Brady		Jul 1, 1964		Midfielder, forward	Born in Chicago	
Renato Bustamante		Apr 14, 1990		Forward, midfielder, and coach	Immigrated to Chicago	
David Cabán		Mar 30, 1993		Midfielder	Born in Chicago	
Reggie Cannon		Jun 11, 1998		Defender	Born in Chicago	
Bill Conterio		Nov 29, 1929	Aug 9, 2017	Midfielder who represented the United States national team	Born in Chicago	
Christopher Cupps		May 26, 2008		Defender	Born in Chicago	
Enzo Ferrario		Mar 3, 2000		Defender	Born in Chicago	
Brian Rowe		Nov 16, 1998		Goalkeeper	Born in Chicago	

== Sports commentators ==
Name	Image	Birth	Death	Known for	Association	Reference
Stuart Scott		Jul 19, 1965	Jan 4, 2015	Sportscaster and anchor on ESPN's SportsCenter	Born in Chicago	
Michael Wilbon		Nov 19, 1958		ESPN commentator and co-host of Pardon the Interruption; sportswriter and columnist for the Washington Post	Born in Chicago	

== Swimming ==
Name	Image	Birth	Death	Known for	Association	Reference
Johnny Weissmuller		Jun 2, 1904	Jan 20, 1984	Olympic gold medalist swimmer (1924 Paris games & 1928 Amsterdam games), later Hollywood actor	Raised in Chicago	

== Tennis ==
Name	Image	Birth	Death	Known for	Association	Reference
Laura Granville		May 12, 1981		Tennis player and head coach of Princeton University women's tennis team	Born in Chicago	
Seymour Greenberg		Aug 10, 1920	Mar 3, 2006	Tennis player; ranked U.S. No. 5 in singles	Born in Chicago	
Andrea Jaeger		Jun 4, 1965		Tennis player and Anglican Dominican nun; winner of 10 singles titles	Born in Chicago	

== Track and field ==
Name	Image	Birth	Death	Known for	Association	Reference
Mike Conley, Sr.		Oct 5, 1962		Olympic gold medalist triple jumper (1992 Barcelona games)	Born in Chicago	

== Volleyball ==
Name	Image	Birth	Death	Known for	Association	Reference
Russ Rose		Nov 29, 1953		Hall of Fame women's volleyball coach at Penn State	Born in Chicago	
Katie Schumacher-Cawley		March 10, 1980		Women's volleyball coach at Penn State, member of Chicago Sports Hall of Fame	Born and raised in Chicago	

== Wrestling ==
Name	Image	Birth	Death	Known for	Association	Reference
Bobby Heenan		Nov 1, 1944	Sep 17, 2017	Retired AWA, WWF and WCW manager and commentator; WWE Hall of Fame inductee	Born in Chicago	
Kalisto		Nov 14, 1986		Two-time WWE United States Champion	Born in Chicago	
CM Punk		Oct 26, 1978		Seven-time World Champion with World Wrestling Entertainment; known as "the longest-reigning WWE Champion of the modern era"; initially retired from WWE in 2014; returned to WWE in November 2023	Born in Chicago	
Justin Roberts		Dec 29, 1979		Former ring announcer for World Wrestling Entertainment, current ring announcer for All Elite Wrestling	Born in Chicago	
Larry Zbyszko		Dec 5, 1951		Former AWA World Champion, WWE Hall of Fame inductee	Born in Chicago	
