= International Girls Baseball League =

League for women's baseball teams in the United States

- Sport: Women's baseball
- Founded: 1952
- Founder: Frank Darling
- First season: December 2, 1952
- Folded: January 11, 1953
- CEO: Harry D. Wilson
- No. of teams: 4
- Country: United States of America
- Last champion: Ft. Lauderdale Rockettes / Hollywood Queens
- Most titles: 1 Ft. Lauderdale Rockettes (1953); Hollywood Queens (1953)
- Related competitions: All-American Girls Professional Baseball League; National Girls Baseball League

The International Girls Baseball League (IGBL) was a professional women's baseball league based in Miami, Florida, which existed for one partial season in the winter of 1952–1953. The four–team International Girls Baseball League was a winter league composed of players from the National Girls Baseball League and its more noted rival counterpart, the All-American Girls Professional Baseball League (AAGPBL), which was featured in the film A League of Their Own. The International Girls Baseball League permanently folded midway through its first season.

== History ==
Arthur Meyerhoff, who served as the All-American Girls Professional Baseball League Commissioner from 1945 through 1950, first envisioned establishing an International Girls Baseball League in 1948. Later, Frank Darling, a team owner of the National Girls Baseball Leagues's Chicago Music Maids wanted to start a winter league in Florida in 1950. Neither was able to bring a winter league to fruition at the time. In the fall and winter of 1952, Darling recruited enough players to establish a four–team league in Florida. Darling became president of the newly named International Girls Baseball League. Harry D. Wilson of the National Girls Baseball League (NGBL) served as secretary.

The league came into existence, beginning in October 1952, as both National Girls Baseball League and All-American Girls Professional Baseball League (AAGPBL) players were recruited to play in the International Girls Baseball League. Potential players received recruiting letters from Darling. If a player agreed to play in the league, she received a contract. Enough players from the NGBL and AAGPBL responded that the league was able to field the four teams. By design, after the IGBL season was completed the players could return to their regular league teams for their scheduled seasons.

The International Girls Baseball League established the Ft. Lauderdale Rockettes, Hollywood Queens, Miami Maids and Miami Beach Belles as the four league teams. The schedule called for 120 games per team, with games to be played between December 2, 1952 and April 28, 1953. Umpires from the men's Florida International League were used.

Game promotions included Ladies' Nights, exhibition games against local men's teams, and a game between the International Girls Baseball League All-Stars and the Fort Lauderdale Rockettes.

When the season started on December 2, 1952, games were played through December 21, 1952 when the league shut down operations for the holidays. Early attendance was negatively affected by cold weather, with 667 fans noted at the season opener and crowds of 200–500 for succeeding games. Players were asked to take a pay cut due to decreased revenues. After a two–week hiatus for the Christmas holidays, games resumed on January 6, 1953. However, weather cancelled many of the games upon the return to play. On January 11, 1953, the league announced that the rest of the season was cancelled. The league noted cold weather and other area attractions contributed to low attendance that led to its folding.

== Rules of play ==
The International Girls Baseball League players wore a skirt-styled uniform, as used by the AAGPBL. The NGBL's baseball pants or shorts-styled uniforms were not used.

== 1952–1953 league standings ==
Team standings	W	L	PCT	GB	Managers
Ft. Lauderdale Rockettes	9	4	.692	–	Manager N/A
Hollywood Queens	9	4	.692	–	Manager N/A
Miami Maids	6	8	.428	3.5	Manager N/A
Miami Beach Belles	4	12	.250	6.5	Manager N/A

The league disbanded January 11, 1953

== Notable alumni ==
- Joan Berger
- Sonny Berger
- Erma Bergmann
- Jaynne Bittner
- Wilma Briggs
- Betty Foss
- Julie Gutz
- Josephine Kabick
- Jacquelyn Kelley
- Marie Mansfield
- Dolores Moore
- Helen Nordquist
- Edythe Perlick
- Ruth Richard
- Joyce Ricketts
- Doris Sams
- Jean Weaver
- Joanne Winter

== Media ==
The National Girls Baseball League was the subject of a documentary. "Their Turn at Bat: The Story of the National Girls Baseball League" is a documentary film by Adam Chu.

The All-American Girls Professional Baseball League was featured in the 1992 fictional film A League of Their Own.

== See also ==
- Major women's sport leagues in North America
- Women's professional sports
- Women's sports
