= Lois Bellman =

American baseball player

- Infield/Outfield Utility
- Born: September 11, 1926; Chicago, Illinois, U.S.
- Died: October 17, 2015 (aged 89); Chicago, Illinois, U.S.
- Batted: Right Threw: Right

Teams
- Chicago Colleens (1949)

Career highlights and awards
- Women in Baseball – AAGPBL Permanent Display at Baseball Hall of Fame and Museum (since 1988)

Lois Bellman [Balchunas] (September 11, 1926 – October 17, 2015) was an All-American Girls Professional Baseball League player. Bellman batted and threw right handed. She was dubbed Punky.

Born in Chicago, Illinois, Bellman joined the league with the Chicago Colleens club in its 1949 season. She did not have individual records or some information was incomplete.

== Sources ==
- All-American Girls Professional Baseball League – Lois Balchunas. Retrieved 2019-03-26.
- Madden, W. C. (2000) All-American Girls Professional Baseball League Record Book. McFarland & Company. ISBN 0-7864-3747-2
- Madden, W. C. (2005) The Women of the All-American Girls Professional Baseball League: A Biographical Dictionary (2005). ISBN 9780786422630
