= Smithdale =

Smithdale may refer to:

- Smithdale, Mississippi, a community in Amite County
- Smithdale, Pennsylvania, a community in Allegheny County
