= Ernestine Petras =

American baseball player (1924–2017)

- Shortstop / Third base
- Born: October 22, 1924; Haskell, New Jersey, U.S.
- Died: November 20, 2017 (aged 93); Haskell, New Jersey, U.S.
- Batted: Right Threw: Right

Teams
- Milwaukee Chicks (1944); Grand Rapids Chicks (1945–1948); Chicago Colleens (1948); Kenosha Comets (1949–1951); Battle Creek Belles (1952)

Career highlights and awards
- Two-time Championship team (1944, 1947); Seven playoff appearances (1944–1950); All-time, single-season leader in fielding average at third base (1952); All-time, single-season leader in double plays at shortstop (1948); Four-time, single-season leader in fielding average at shortstop (1945–1947, 1950)

Ernestine Petras [״Teeny״] (October 22, 1924 – November 20, 2017) was an infielder who played from 1944 through 1952 in the All-American Girls Professional Baseball League (AAGPBL). Listed at 5 ft 5 in (1.65 m), 125 lb., Petras batted and threw right-handed. She was born in the Haskell section of Wanaque, New Jersey. Ernestine Petras played for five different teams during her AAGPBL career which spanned nine years, being considered one of the best defensive shortstops in league history, yet she never made the All-Star team. Her light hitting probably prevented her being selected.

A flashy infielder with a strong and secure throwing arm, Petras posted the highest fielding average at her position in four of those years: 1945, 1946, 1947 and 1950, when her .957 average ranked as the third best for a single season in the league's record books. She also set a league season record for the most double plays in 1948, and after moving to the third base in 1952, she was the best fielder at her new position. As a fielder, she committed only 249 errors in 2411 total chances for a solid .943 career fielding average.

Basically a slap hitter, Petras batted a modest 198 average in 834 career games, but she had the ability to get on base by any means, way above the pure ability to get the hit, reaching first base by walks, by a bunt single or being hit by the pitcher. A a baserunner, she collected 420 stolen bases, and also knew when to take the additional base on an overthrow – 71 of her 552 hits were for extra bases. A hard-to-strikeout hitter, she posted a solid 1.37 BB/K (342-to-249) in 2,790 at-bats.

Petras entered the league in 1944 with the Milwaukee Chicks, appearing in 25 games as the primary backup to incumbent shortstop Merle Keagle. With Max Carey at the helm, the Chicks went on to win the Championship Title, beating the Kenosha Comets in the best-of-seven series. Although the Chicks won the title, they had no local financial backing and could not compete with the American Association Milwaukee Brewers. Due to lack of community support and skepticism of journalists, the team moved to Grand Rapids, Michigan prior to the 1945 season.

In 1945, Keagle married and did not play for the new Grand Rapids Chicks, being replaced by Petras at shortstop. As an everyday player, Petras appeared in all games for Grand Rapids (110), as part of an infield that included Betty Whiting (1B), Alma Ziegler (2B) and Doris Tetzlaff (3B). Petras led all shortstops with a .918 fielding average, while hitting .162 with a team's second-best 29 runs batted in, five behind teammate Thelma Eisen. Third place Grand Rapids advanced to the playoffs, but lost in the best-of-five first round series to the Rockford Peaches.

By 1946 Petras was a popular figure in Grand Rapids, where she made many close friends and received fan mail, which included a proposal of marriage. She improved to a .192 average, while playing in all games for the Chicks (112) and leading again the league in fielding average with a .951 mark. She also stole 53 bases, drove in 34 runs and scored 38 more. In the playoffs, it would be a replay of the previous season as the Chicks were over matched by the Peaches in the best-of-five first round series.

In 1947 nearly a million fans came out to watch the eight AAGPBL teams play during the 112-game schedule. For the third consecutive season, Petras played in all games for the Chicks and topped shortstops in fielding, this time with a .942 average. She also contributed with a .175 average, 45 runs, 25 RBI and 51 steals. Grand Rapids, managed by Johnny Rawlings, advanced to the final series after defeating the South Bend Blue Sox in the first round, three to two games. In the championship playoffs, Grand Rapids took a 3–1 advantage against the Racine Belles, but lost the next two games to send the series to a seventh game. Then, in a tough pitcher's duel, Grand Rapids' Mildred Earp beat Anna Mae Hutchison and the Belles, 1–0, to clinch the championship.

Petras opened 1948 with the Chicks, but was dealt to the expansion Chicago Colleens during the midseason, as the league usually switched players as needed to help new teams to be competitive. When she was transferred to the new team, a public plea was written by the club president Nate Harkness to accept her departure. An enormous crowd attended her last game in a Chicks uniform, and she felt heartbroken to leave her loyal fans and the close playing relationship formed with second bagger Ziegler. In 108 games, Petras posted a combined .218 average and a .321 on-base percentage, driving in 32 runs and scoring 59 times, while stealing a career-high 86 bases to rank seventh in the league. She also turned in 48 double plays to achieve a single season record while collecting a .948 fielding average.

For the next three years Petras became part of the Kenosha Comets. She averaged 49 stolen bases in each of these years, with a second-best career of 73 stolen bases in 1949 to rank second behind Racine's Sophie Kurys (137). She also amassed a .213 average and a .329 OBP in the same period, including a .231 average and 52 steals in 1951. Kenosha made the playoffs in 1950, losing the first round to Rockford three to one games.

In 1952 Petras joined the Battle Creek Belles and made the transition to third base. She hit a career-high .233 with 42 stolen bases in 92 games, while leading all fielders with a .965 average.

Following her baseball career, she made Barnegat Township, New Jersey her new home.

Since 1988 Petras is part of Women in Baseball, a permanent display based at the Baseball Hall of Fame and Museum in Cooperstown, New York, which was unveiled to honor the entire All-American Girls Professional Baseball League rather than individual baseball personalities. Then, in 2000 she and other surviving Milwaukee Chicks were honored by the Milwaukee Brewers Major League team before a game against the San Diego Padres. Tributes to the club may be found in Miller Park.

Besides this, in 2002, during the Women's Equality Day, Petras and fellow AAGPBL player Jane Moffet were honored by New Jersey Governor Jim McGreevey prior to a Trenton Thunder minor league baseball game at Mercer County Waterfront Park.

In 2011, Petras participated as a panel member and keynote speaker for Women's History Month celebration at Bergen Community College.

Petras died November 20, 2017.

== Career statistics ==
Batting

GP	AB	R	H	2B	3B	HR	RBI	SB	BB	SO	BA	OBP
834	2790	359	552	55	16	0	196	420	342	249	.198	.285

Fielding

GP	PO	A	E	TC	DP	FA
823	1791	2411	249	4451	203	.943

Playoffs

GP	AB	R	H	2B	3B	HR	RBI	SB	BA	PO	A	E	TC	DP	FA
27	95	8	17	3	1	0	4	11	.179	45	71	7	123	2	.943
