= Eileen Albright =

Marie Eileen Albright
- Pitcher
- Born: March 25, 1928; Wollaston (Quincy, Massachusetts), U.S.
- Died: May 9, 2009 (aged 81); Roanoke, Virginia, U.S.
- Batted: Left Threw: Right

Teams
- Chicago Colleens (1948)

Career highlights and awards
- Women in Baseball – AAGPBL Permanent Display at Baseball Hall of Fame and Museum (1988)

Marie Eileen Albright [Lockhart] (March 25, 1928 – May 9, 2009) was an infielder and pitcher who played in the All-American Girls Professional Baseball League (AAGPBL). Albright batted left-handed and threw right-handed. She was born in Wollaston, Quincy, Massachusetts.

Little is known about this player who appeared in a few games in an AAGPBL season. She was born to J. Carl Albright and Florence Lipp Albright, and had a brother, Howard. Albright joined the league's traveling team in 1948 in order to develop her skills and be placed on one of the expansion teams for that season. Basically, she played at second and third bases and pitched as well. She obtained the job and was assigned to the Chicago Colleens, who along with the Springfield Sallies joined as expansion teams for the 1948 season.

Albright pitched primarily for the Colleens and started four games, which were all losses. As a hitter, she posted a .141 average.

By the end of 1948, the Colleens and Sallies lost their franchises based on their awful debuts. For the next two years the Colleens and Sallies became rookie training teams.

She married Reverend Paul E. Lockhart and had three daughters.

== Career statistics ==
Batting

GP	AB	R	H	2B	3B	HR	RBI	SB	BB	SO	BA	OBP
65	142	9	20	3	0	0	4	9	19	24	.141	.242

Pitching

GP	W	L	W-L%	ERA	IP	H	RA	ER	BB	SO	HBP	WP	WHIP
4	0	4	.000	2.46	22	17	11	6	19	10	0	0	1.64

Fielding

GP	PO	A	E	TC	DP	FA
55	90	114	20	224	8	.911

== History facts ==
- During the early 1940s the AAGPBL recruited young women to play baseball to keep the spirit of the game alive while the men fought overseas. The league, created in 1943 by the Chicago Cubs' owner Philip K. Wrigley, gave over 600 women athletes the opportunity to play professional baseball and to play it at a level never before attained. The AAGPBL folded in 1954, but there is now a permanent display at the Baseball Hall of Fame and Museum since November 5, 1988 that honors those who were part of this unforgettable experience. Eileen Albright, along with the rest of the AAGPBL players, is now enshrined in the venerable building at Cooperstown, New York.
- In 1992, filmmaker Penny Marshall premiered her film A League of Their Own, which was a fictionalized account of activities in the All-American Girls Professional Baseball League. Starring Geena Davis, Tom Hanks, Madonna, Lori Petty and Rosie O'Donnell, this film brought a rejuvenated interest to the extinct AAGPBL. Many baseball historians consider the league's players as pioneers of an important movement which has eventually brought women's athletics to the prominent place it occupies in the 21st century.

== Sources ==
- Marie Eileen Lockhart – Profile / Obituary All-American Girls Professional Baseball League. Retrieved 2019-04-10.
- All-American Girls Professional Baseball League Record Book – W. C. Madden. Publisher: McFarland & Company, 2000. Format: Hardcover, 294pp. ISBN 0-7864-0597-X
- Encyclopedia of Women and Baseball – Leslie A. Heaphy, Mel Anthony May. Publisher: McFarland & Company, 2006. Format: Softcover, 438pp. ISBN 0-7864-2100-2
- The Women of the All-American Girls Professional Baseball League: A Biographical Dictionary – W. C. Madden. Publisher: McFarland & Company, 2005. Format: Softcover, 295 pp. ISBN 978-0-7864-2263-0
