= Dorice Reid (baseball) =

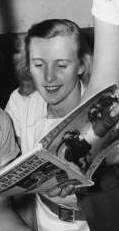
- Outfield
- Born: February 26, 1929; Superior, Wisconsin, U.S.
- Died: August 17, 2017 (aged 88)
- Batted: Right Threw: Right

Teams
- Chicago Colleens (1948); Grand Rapids Chicks (1949–1951)

Dorice Reid (February 26, 1929 – August 17, 2017) was an outfielder who played from 1948 through 1951 in the All-American Girls Professional Baseball League (AAGPBL). Listed at 5 ft 4 in (1.63 m), 140 lb., Reid batted and threw right-handed. She was born in Superior, Wisconsin.

Nicknamed ״Dorrie״, Reid was a light-hitting outfielder during her four years in the AAGPBL. She entered the circuit in 1948 with the expansion Chicago Colleens, playing for them one year before joining the Grand Rapids Chicks (1949–1951).

Her most productive came in 1950, when she hit a .199 batting average with 78 hits and 43 stolen bases in 107 games, all career numbers.

Following her baseball career, Reid settled in Vista, California.

In 1988, Dorice Reid became part of Women in Baseball, a permanent display based at the Baseball Hall of Fame and Museum in Cooperstown, New York, which was unveiled to honor the entire All-American Girls Professional Baseball League.

== Career statistics ==
Batting

GP	AB	R	H	2B	3B	HR	RBI	SB	TB	BB	SO	BA	OBP	SLG
323	1026	108	170	11	5	0	60	69	191	130	145	.166	.260	.186

Fielding

GP	PO	A	E	TC	DP	FA
320	1017	288	40	1345	19	.970
