= National Girls Baseball League =

League for women's baseball teams in the United States

- Sport: Women's baseball
- Founded: 1944
- Founder: Emery Parichy & Charles Bidwill
- First season: 1944
- Folded: 1954
- CEO: Red Grange
- No. of teams: 6
- Country: United States of America
- Last champion: Wilson-Jones Bloomer Girls
- Most titles: Bloomer Girls (3); Queens/Kandy Kids (3)
- Related competitions: All-American Girls Professional Baseball League
- Website: https://www.nationalgirlsbaseballleague.com/

The National Girls Baseball League (NGBL) was a professional women's baseball league which existed from 1944 to 1954, with teams based in Chicago, Illinois. The National Girls Baseball League started a year after the All-American Girls Professional Baseball League (AAGPBL), which was featured in the film A League of Their Own. The National Girls Baseball League differed from the AAGPBL in that the NGBL kept and allowed the traditional underhand softball pitching format. Football legend Red Grange served as commissioner of the National Girls Baseball League.

== History ==
The National Girls Baseball League was founded in 1944 by Forest Park, Illinois contractor Emery Parichy, Charles Bidwill, who was owner of the Chicago Cardinals football team and politician Ed Kolski. Parichy had built Parichy Stadium in Forest Park in 1934 and owned a softball league, the Metropolitan League. Parichy and Bidwell hired Red Grange to preside over the league.

The National Girls Baseball League was formed in 1944 and played 11 seasons. It was formed as a result of scouts for the Chicago–based All–American Girls Professional Baseball League scouting and recruiting talent from the Chicago softball Metropolitan League, run by Parichy. It was decided to then turn the Metropolitan League to a professional league.

The National Girls Baseball League consisted of teams from the greater Chicago, Illinois area and regularly drew over 500,000 fans annually. Unlike the All American Girls Professional Baseball League, the National Girls Baseball League kept the traditional underhand softball pitching format. Thus it technically wasn't a baseball league, but rather a rebranded fastpitch softball league.

"For two seasons our league outdrew the White Sox in attendance," noted player Freda Savona, in reference to the Chicago White Sox of MLB. “They packed the place,” said Al Maag, of the NGBL attendance. Maag was the founder of the Chicago 16-inch Softball Hall of Fame, which posthumously inducted and honored Charles Bidwill with the Richard J. Daley Friend of Softball Award in 2013 for his contributions to women's baseball and softball.

The National Girls Baseball League had six teams, all owned by Emery Parichy: the Bloomer Girls, Blue Birds, Chicks, Queens, Cardinals, and Music Maids. The Forest Park based Bloomer Girls were moved by Parichy to Chicago from Boston in 1937 and used the "Parichy Bloomer Girls" moniker, playing home games at Parichy Stadium. The league played at ballparks throughout Chicago, including Soldier Field and Wrigley Field.

The National Girls Baseball League was in competition with the All–American Girls Professional Baseball League. The integrated National Girls Baseball League offered higher salaries and emphasized closer road game schedules in an attempt to secure the best players. League rosters included an African–American, Betty Chapman; a Chinese–American, Gwen Wong; and Nancy Ito, a Japanese–American. One player, Freda Savona, was rumored to earn $500 a week. Connie Wisniewski jumped to the NGBL when the AAGPBL switched to overhand throwing and Audrey Wagner was a notable AAGPBL player who switched to the NGBL. Pro Football Hall of Fame member Red Grange served as league president. Retired major league baseball players Buck Weaver (Black Sox Scandal) and Woody English were team managers.

In 1946, after two years of conflict over players, the administrators in the two leagues reached a non–raiding agreement.

Red Grange served as commissioner of the National Girls Baseball League until 1949. Grange was replaced as commissioner by Arch Wolfe, who had worked for the Chicago Cardinals. Wolfe had served as president of the league, with Ed Kolski serving as secretary and Emery Piarchy as treasurer.

In the winter of 1952–1953, players from both the AAGPL and National Girls Baseball League played together in the four–team International Girls Baseball League (IGBL) based in Miami, Florida. The league was formed by Frank Darling, the owner of the NGBL’s Music Maids. Darling served as the president, while Harry D. Wilson, also from the NGBL, served as league secretary. Darling recruited players from both leagues and created the team rosters and schedule.

Connie Wisniewski, a former AAGPBL player of the year, played in the 1950 National Girls Baseball League. Wisniewski played for the 1950 Music Maids, winning 30 games as a pitcher. Wisniewski returned to the Grand Rapids Chicks of the AAGPL in 1951.

Freda Savona was called the “Babe Ruth” of the NGBL, setting home run records and batting over .400 in 1951.

Audrey Wagner joined the Parichy Bloomer Girls and the National Girls Baseball League in 1950 from the AAGPL. Offered a higher salary, a signing bonus, with no extensive travel, Wagner valued being home every night, being closer to school and her studies. With a salary of 125 dollars a week, Wagner put herself through school at Elmhurst College and then the University of Illinois-Chicago, where Wagner earned her MD in 1955. Wagner helped her team to the Championship in 1950 and made the All–Star Team in each of her four seasons in the National Girls Baseball League. In 1952, Wagner led the league in doubles, triples, home runs and total bases, and was second in the batting, with a .364 average.

Sophie Kurys stole 1,141 bases in her career. She joined the National Girls Baseball League in 1951, moving from the AAGPL with her teammate Joanne Winter. Together, they helped lead the Admiral Music Maids to the 1951 championship. Kurys played three seasons in the National Girls Baseball League.

Lois Roberts Strenkowski played barefoot for the duration of her time in the National Girls Baseball League and throughout her career. Playing for the Cardinals team in the NGBL, she made $65 per week playing for two seasons through 1951. In June, 2010, on her 90th birthday, celebrated at Dodger Stadium, Strenkowski was given the honor to announce the Dodgers' opening words, “It’s time for Dodger baseball.”

After the 1952 National Girls Baseball League season, Jesse Owens was on hand to present Dolores Moore with the league's Most Valuable Player Award at a ceremony. Moore's manager Woody English, became the manager of the AAGPBL's Grand Rapids Chicks and added Moore to his roster.

After the 1954 season, the National Girls Baseball League folded amid declining attendance. Increased TV viewing of Major League Baseball was a factor.

In 2013, in a women's professional softball league game, the Chicago Bandits of the National Pro Fastpitch Softball played tribute to the Parichy Bloomer Girls and the National Girls Baseball League by wearing replica Bloomer Girls' uniforms.

== Rules of play ==
The league allowed underhand pitching and used a 12" ball. Uniforms generally consisted of long knee socks, jerseys over long-sleeves and shorts.

== Teams by season ==
- 1944: Bloomer Girls, Bluebirds, Chicks, Kandy Kids, Sparks
- 1945: Bloomer Girls, Bluebirds, Chicks, Queens (former Kandy Kids), Music Maids, Sparks
- 1946: Bloomer Girls, Bluebirds, Chicks, Queens, Music Maids, Sparks
- 1947: Bloomer Girls, Bluebirds, Chicks, Queens, Music Maids, Cardinals (former Sparks)
- 1948: Bloomer Girls, Bluebirds, Chicks, Queens, Music Maids, Cardinals
- 1949: Bloomer Girls, Bluebirds, Rock-Olas (former Chicks), Queens, Music Maids, Cardinals
- 1950: Bloomer Girls, Bluebirds, Rock-Olas, Queens, Music Maids, Cardinals
- 1951: Bloomer Girls, Bluebirds, Rock-Olas, Queens, Music Maids, Cecashers (former Cardinals)
- 1952: Bloomer Girls, Bluebirds, Belles (former Rock-Olas), Queens, Music Maids, Cecashers
- 1953: Bloomer Girls, Bluebirds, Queens, Maids
- 1954: Bloomer Girls, Bluebirds, Queens, All-Stars/Jewels

== Ballparks ==
- Admiral Stadium, South River Road, Des Plaines, IL 60016
- Athletic Field, North Chicago, IL 60088
- Bidwill Stadium, 1975 East 75th Street, Chicago, IL 60649
- Boltwood Park, Main Street & Dodge Avenue, Evanston, IL 60202
- Gill Stadium, 1107 East 87th Street, Chicago, IL 60619
- Lane Stadium, 2600 West Addison Street, Chicago, IL 60618
- North Town Currency/Thillens Stadium, 3200 West Devon Avenue, Chicago, IL 60659
- Parichy Memorial Stadium, Harrison Street & Harlem Avenue, Forest Park, IL 60130
- Rock-Ola Stadium, 4200 N Central Avenue, Chicago, IL, 60634
- Shewbridge Field, West 74th St & South Aberdeen Street, Chicago, IL 60621
- Soldier Field, 1410 Museum Campus Drive, Chicago, IL 60605
- Sparta Stadium, South Kostner Avenue & West 21st Street, Chicago, IL 60623
- Wrigley Field, 1060 West Addison Street, Chicago, IL 60613

== League champions/runner-up ==
YEAR / CHAMPION / RUNNER-UP

- 1944 Champion: Brach's Kandy Kids. Runner-up: Chicago Chicks
- 1945 Champion: Rock-Ola Music Maids. Runner-up: Chicago Bluebirds
- 1946 Champion: Chicago Bluebirds. Runner-up: Chicago Chicks
- 1947 Champion: Parichy's Bloomer Girls, Forest Park, IL. Runner-up: Chicago Queens
- 1948 Champion: Parichy's Bloomer Girls, Forest Park, IL. Runner-up: Chicago Queens
- 1949 Champion: Chicago Bluebirds. Runner-up: Match Corporation Queens
- 1950 Champion: Match Corporation Queens,. Runner-up: Chicago Bluebirds
- 1951 Champion: Tony Piet Queens. Runner-up: Parichy's Bloomer Girls, Forest Park, IL
- 1952 Champion: Alemitte Queens. Runner-up:Chicago Bluebirds
- 1953 Champion: Mitchell's Maids. Runner-up: Wilson-Jones Bloomer Girls, Forest Park, IL
- 1954 Champion: Wilson-Jones Bloomer Girls, Forest Park, IL. Runner-up: Chicago Bluebirds

== Notable alumni ==
- Vivian Anderson
- Charlotte Armstrong
- Sonny Berger
- Erma Bergmann
- Charles Bidwill (Founder)
- Geraldine Bureker
- Corinne Clark
- Josephine D'Angelo
- Woody English (Manager)
- Red Grange (league president)
- Irene Kerwin
- Audrey Kissel
- Sophie Kurys
- Lucella MacLean
- Anna Meyer
- Betty Moczynski
- Dolores Moore
- Anna Mae O'Dowd
- Toni Palermo
- Edythe Perlick
- Viola Thompson
- Betty Tucker
- Audrey Wagner
- Buck Weaver (Manager)
- Helen Westerman
- Joanne Winter
- Connie Wisniewski

== Media ==
The National Girls Baseball League was the subject of a documentary. "Their Turn at Bat: The Story of the National Girls Baseball League" is a documentary film by Adam Chu.

== See also ==
- Major women's sport leagues in North America
- Women's professional sports
- Women's sports
- National Girls Baseball League players
