= Dolly Niemiec =

American baseball player (1931–2018)

- Second base
- Born: May 27, 1931; Chicago, Illinois, U.S.
- Died: September 22, 2018 (aged 87); Caledonia, Michigan, U.S.
- Batted: Right Threw: Right

Teams
- Chicago Colleens (1948); Springfield Sallies (1949); Grand Rapids Chicks (1950); Battle Creek Belles (1951); Grand Rapids Chicks (1951–1952)

Dolly Niemiec (May 27, 1931 – September 22, 2018) was an American baseball player who played in the All-American Girls Professional Baseball League between 1948 and 1952. She both batted and threw right-handed.

== Early baseball beginnings ==
Dolly learned how to play baseball—like a lot of her peers—from the boys with whom she grew up in her Chicago neighborhood, running around outside getting dirty and bruised just like all the boys were used to doing. She earned the nickname "Dolly Gopher" because when playing softball with her father, he would say "Dolly, go for this ball. Go for that ball."

She recalled how the neighborhood boys would "play in a huge lot behind a factory. We used sickles to cut the grass and cardboard boxes for the bases. Then we put big rocks on them so that they wouldn’t blow away.” Of the boys she played with she recalls, "their sisters had the most beautiful dolls. I had the most beautiful bats and balls."

One day, when she was 15 years old, Dolly's father came across a newspaper article about tryouts in a women's baseball league. Her first reaction however was "girls don't play baseball." It wasn't that she believed that girls couldn't play baseball, she just wasn't aware of any who did.

Despite this, she came along to the field and was "amazed" at how many women she saw there. She said that she "thought [she] was the only girl in the city who played baseball."

== Dolly's professional baseball career ==
Dolly played second base and third base for the Chicago Colleens (in 1948), the Springfield Sallies (in 1949), the Battle Creek Belles (in 1951), and between 1950 and 1952, the Grand Rapids Chicks. After making it in the minor leagues, Dolly joined the 1949 barnstorming tour that allocated minor league players to the major league. She began with the New Orleans tour, then to Florida and up the East Coast.

== After baseball ==
In 1952, an auto accident resulted in Dolly's early retirement. Following that, she became a professional bowler, coaching her sons' Little League teams, as well as being an umpire for high school baseball and softball games.

== A league of their own ==
When the movie was released in 1992, Dolly actually had a role in it. Regarding the movie that starred Madonna, Dolly says: "Madonna was great. She was in the outfield changing into spikes, I asked her to sign a visor for me and she did. The entire experience of that movie changed my life for the better."

Dolly died on September 22, 2018.

== Career statistics ==
Year	G	AB	R	H	2B	3B	HR	RBI	SB	BB	SO	AVG
1948	-	-	-	-	-	-	-	-	-	-	-	.000
1949	-	-	-	-	-	-	-	-	-	-	-	.000
1950	49	147	12	25	3	0	0	4	1	12	24	.170
1951	29	65	8	6	0	0	0	6	0	12	7	.092
1952	-10	-	-	-	-	-	-	-	-	-	-	.000

== Sources ==
1. AAGPBL 2. The St. Augustine Record 3. YouTube
