= Betty Bays =

American baseball player (1931–1992)

- Outfielder / Catcher
- Born: April 1, 1931; Bisbee, Arizona, U.S.
- Died: April 12, 1992 (aged 61); Bisbee, Arizona, U.S.
- Batted: Right Threw: Right

Teams
- Chicago Colleens (1950); Springfield Sallies (1950); Grand Rapids Chicks (1951)

Career highlights and awards
- Women in Baseball – AAGPBL Permanent Display at Baseball Hall of Fame and Museum (since 1988)

Betty Bays (née Schuller; April 1, 1931 – April 12, 1992) was an American outfielder and catcher who played from 1950 to 1951 in the All-American Girls Professional Baseball League (AAGPBL). She batted and threw right handed.

Bays was born in Bisbee, Arizona, where she graduated from Bisbee High School in 1949. After attending a tryout, she signed a contract with the AAGPBL and played on the Chicago Colleens and Springfield Sallies rookie teams in 1950, before joining the league with the Grand Rapids Chicks a year later.

It was widely reported that Bays hit a home run at the original Yankee Stadium during an exhibition game between the Colleens and Sallies. She then posted a batting average of .220 (44-for-200) with 20 runs scored and 30 runs batted in, including two doubles, two triples, and 14 stolen bases in 49 games with Grand Rapids. Afterwards, she returned home to play fastpitch softball for the Bisbee Copper Queens club.

Bays was part of the AAGPBL permanent display at the Baseball Hall of Fame and Museum in Cooperstown, New York, opened in 1988, which is dedicated to the entire league rather than any individual figure.

== Death ==
Betty Bays died in 1992 in Bisbee, Arizona, aged 61. In December 2012, she was honored posthumously when the Bisbee High School Board named its softball field after her.
