= Mary Wood (baseball) =

American baseball player

- Outfielder
- Born: Lakewood, Ohio, U.S.
- Bats: Right Throws: Right

Teams
- Peoria Redwings (1946); Kenosha Comets (1947)

Mary Wood was a backup outfielder who played in the All-American Girls Professional Baseball League (AAGPBL). She batted and threw right handed.

Born in Lakewood, Ohio, Wood joined the league for a couple of seasons. In 1946, she was on the original roster of the Peoria Redwings and joined the Kenosha Comets a year later.

In a 152-game career, Wood posted a batting average of .165 (79-for-480) with 36 runs and 19 RBI, including six doubles, three triples, and 59 stolen bases. As a fielder, she hauled in 270 putouts with 23 assists and turned five double plays, while committing 21 errors in 314 total chances for a .983 fielding average.

The AAGPBL folded in 1954.

== Legacy ==
Since November 5, 1988 there is a permanent display at the Baseball Hall of Fame and Museum at Cooperstown, New York that honors those who were part of this unique experience. Mary Wood, along with the rest of the league's girls, is included at the display/exhibit.

== See also ==
- List of All-American Girls Professional Baseball League players
