= Esther Morrison =

American baseball player (1931–2018)

Esther Morrison (later Gamberdella, May 26, 1931 – December 30, 2018) was an American baseball player. She played in the All-American Girls Professional Baseball League (AAGPBL). Morrison both threw and batted right-handed. At 19 years old she was a mere five feet tall.

== Personal background ==
Esther Morrison was born in Chicago, Illinois on May 26, 1931. She was given the nickname "Schmattze" (which means little rag in Jewish/Polish) by a girlfriend from her neighbourhood. Morrison earned the name as when playing ball she one time hit her whole body against the back fence, cut her face and was bleeding. Morrison's childhood was spent playing ball with the boys and shining shoes for local kingpins. One person she shined shoes for was Al Capone; she didn't know who he was at the time.

== Baseball career ==
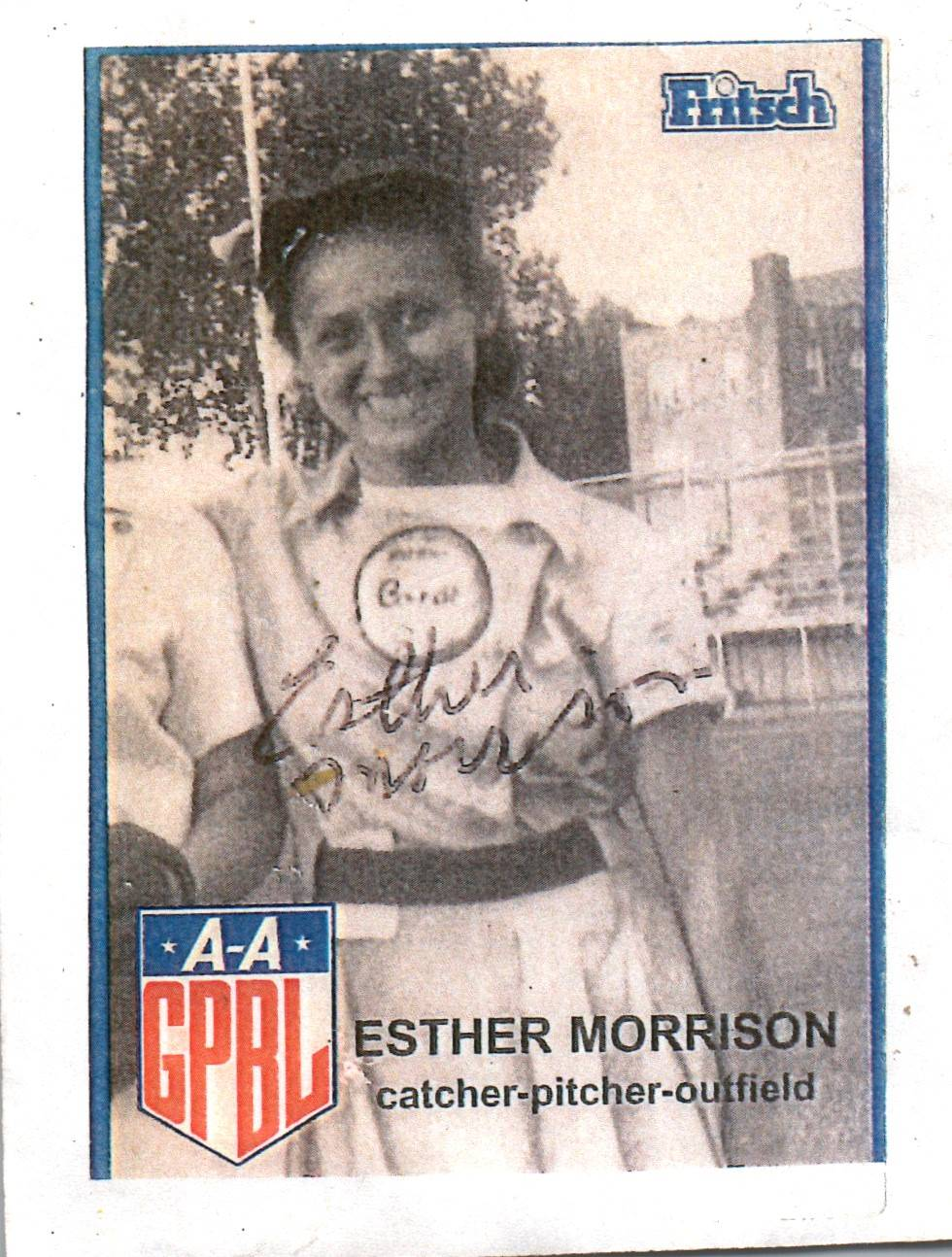

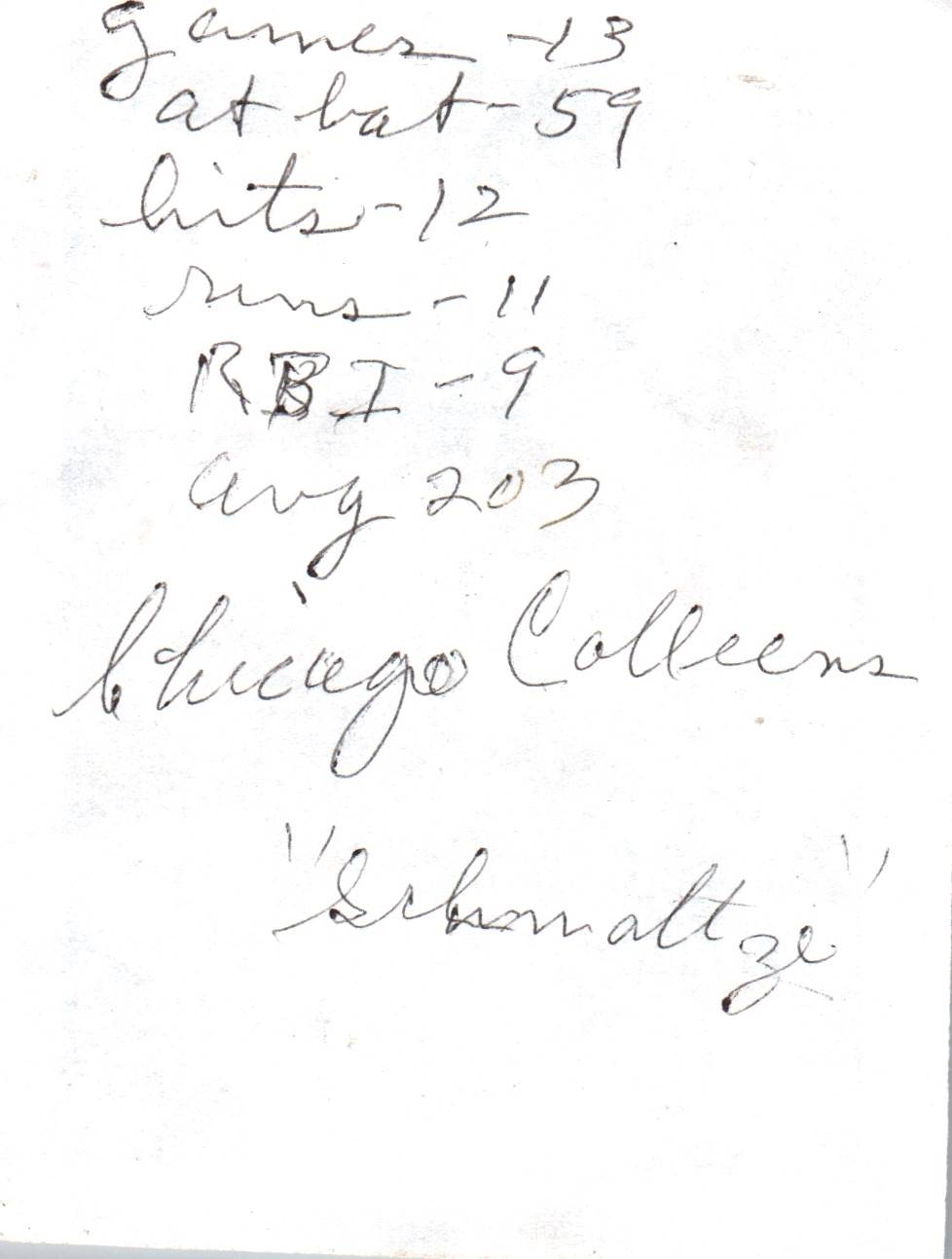

The AAGPBL recruited Morrison after she followed some other neighborhood girls into a building at the Franklin Park playground. She was asked if she could play ball by someone and she responded in the affirmative. She was then given a mitt when she told him she could play in the positions of: catcher, pitcher and outfielder. She used her stepfather's last name to register as she thought her Italian name Gamberdella would be too complicated to work with.

Morrison played for the Chicago Colleens and the Springfield Sallies. During this time, with the team she traveled to Georgia, Tennessee and New York. She had to retire early from the league however, due to an undiagnosed case of severe anemia, explaining, that "every time [she] bent down for a ground ball, [her] nose would bleed. So [she] had to quit."

Along with the other AAGPBL Girls of Summer, Morrison was inducted into the Baseball Hall of Fame in Cooperstown, NY, in 1988.

== Retirement and death ==
In 1988, Morrison spent a whole year in hospital following a car accident and she also had rickets.

Morrison died on December 30, 2018, at the age of 87.

== Career statistics ==
Batting record

Year	G	AB	R	H	2B	3B	HR	RBI	SB	BB	SO	AVG
1950	13	59	11	12	0	1	0	9	0	-	-	.204
