= Toni Ann Palermo =

American baseball player (1933–2024)

- Born: February 5, 1933; Forest Park, Illinois, U.S.
- Died: April 5, 2024 (aged 91)
- Burial place: Mount Olivet Cemetery (Milwaukee)
- Education: Alverno College; University of Wisconsin–Madison
- Known for: Professional baseball player

Toni Ann Palermo (February 15, 1933 – April 5, 2024) was an American baseball player with the All-American Girls Professional Baseball League (AAGPBL). She began playing as a child with neighborhood teams, eventually being recruited into the higher leagues. When she was twenty, she joined the School Sisters of St. Francis in Milwaukee. She taught in Wisconsin grade and high schools before eventually attaining a Ph.D. in interdisciplinary studies from the University of Wisconsin–Madison.

== Early life ==
Toni Ann Palermo was born in Forest Park, Illinois, in February 1933 to Fred and Elvira Palermo, both of Italian descent. Since the family spoke only Italian, Palermo began to learn English when she went to school at the age of five. Palermo began to play baseball as a child. When she was eleven, she was recruited into the Parichy Bloomer Girls, a farm team in the National Girls Baseball League, organized by Mr. Parichy, a construction worker from the area. The following year, 1945, the All-American Girls Professional Baseball League (AAGPBL) invited her to go with them to Cuba for spring training. She refused the invitation. However, three years later, at age fourteen, she was asked to go on tour with the AAGPBL to play shortstop. In the summers of 1949 and 1950, two of the teams, the Chicago Colleens and Springfield Sallies, barnstormed for the league, traveling throughout the United States. The two teams traveled together on busses and trains, playing each evening in a different city, to show their ability as women to play baseball. Palermo described how it was to sleep on a crowded bus without air conditioning: "There was no complaining, moaning, groaning, and no gossiping." In August 1950, they played a game at Yankee Stadium.

== Education ==
Palermo's grade school years were spent in her hometown of Forest Park, Illinois. She then went to Proviso East High School in Maywood, Illinois. It was during the summers of these years that she played shortstop for the AAGPBL. She earned her Bachelor of Science degree in English, history and math from Alverno College. She then earned three master's degrees and a Doctor of Philosophy degree from the University of Wisconsin–Madison. She taught in the Physical Education Department and the School of Social Work at the University. Her doctorate was interdisciplinary, that is, it included six program areas: counseling, adult education, administration, supervision, educational policy studies, and communication arts.

== Stats ==
Year	G	AB	R	H	2B	3B	HR	RBI	SB	BB	SO	AVG
1950	33	117	30	24	0	0	0	6	14	39	13	.376

== Life after baseball ==
Palermo had decided that when she graduated from high school she would join the School Sisters of St. Francis in Milwaukee. She had been earning $75 a week which she always sent home to her father in an effort to help him financially. Even though she "ate, drank and slept baseball," she felt committed to keep her promise to join the School Sisters. In 1956 she was assigned to teach first grade at St. Therese School in Kankakee, Illinois. In 1962 Palermo taught at St. Walter School in Roselle, Illinois. In 1967 she moved to SS. Peter and Paul School in Naperville, Illinois where she taught Physical Education. She completed 13 years of teaching in the Diocese of Joliet. In 1970 she began her studies at the University of Wisconsin–Madison.

Palermo taught in Madison at the University of Wisconsin (1970–1980) and Sacred Heart School (1975–1979), and at Immaculate Heart of Mary School in Monona, and St. Francis School in Cross Plains (1981–1983). In 1976 she directed a seminar at the Fox Valley Technical Institute on "The Joy of Being a Woman." Palermo also served as associate director of the Marriage and Family Life Center in Madison (1979–1981). Beginning in 1983, Palermo ministered in Madison as a psychotherapist, and beginning in 2004, also served as a sales director for Mary Kay Cosmetics. Later, Palermo took up tennis. In 1993 she played in the U.S Women's 45 and over Grass Court Tennis Championship . In 2019 she spent time coaching students at Walden Middle School in Racine, Wisconsin.

Palermo died on April 5, 2024, at the age of 91.

== Awards ==
She was recognized by the Baseball Association of Chicago for "Excellence as an AAGPBL Player, Educator and Leader."

August 5, 2013, Alverno College honored her in an historic baseball game as one of three alums who played for the Chicago Colleens and the Springfield Sallies.

October 27, 2016, she was recognized at the Interfaith Conference of Greater Milwaukee's Values in Action award ceremony.
