= Jason Avant =

American football player (born 1983)

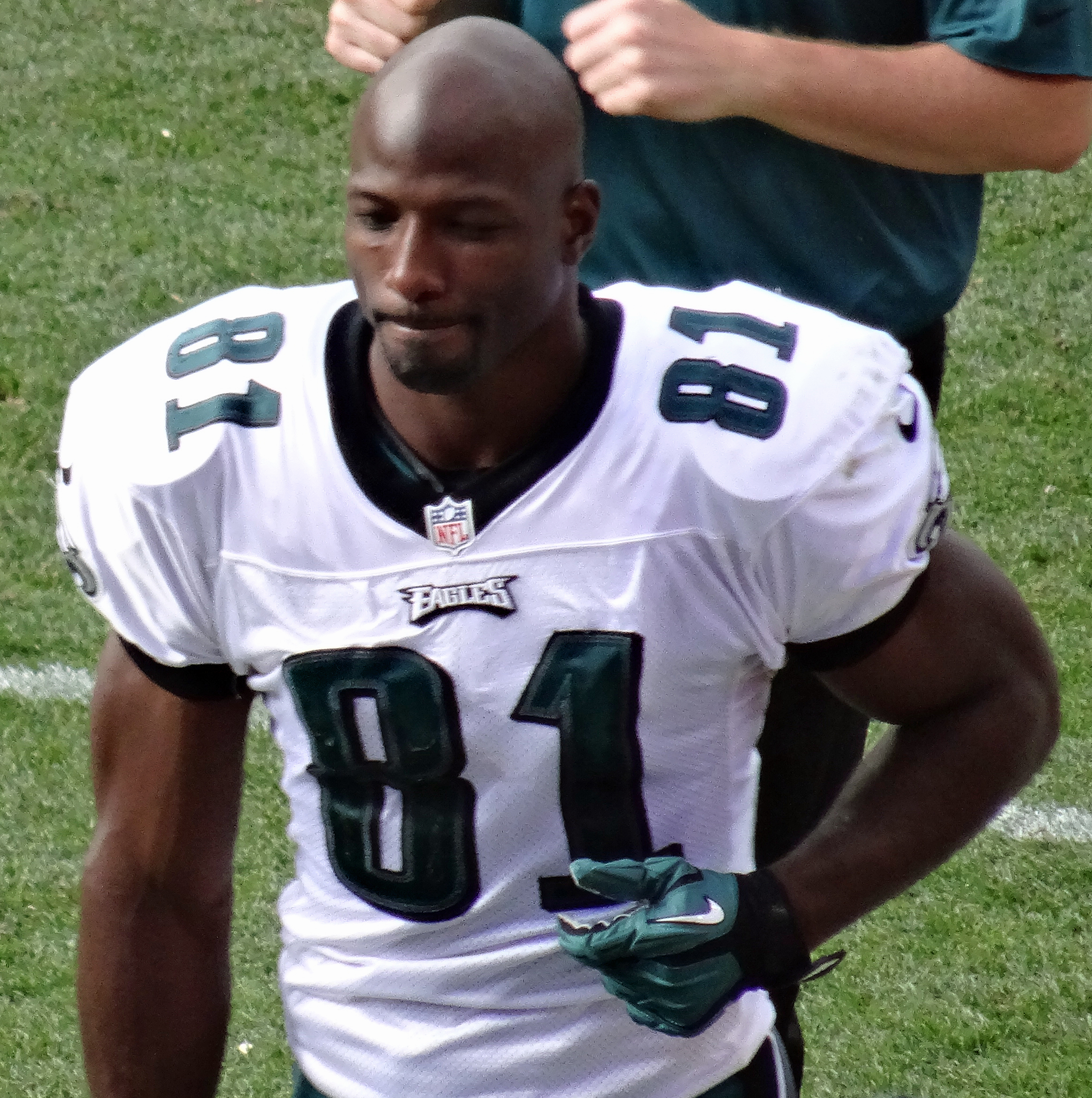
- Avant with the Philadelphia Eagles in 2013

No. 81
- Position: Wide receiver

Personal information
- Born: April 20, 1983 (age 43); Chicago, Illinois, U.S.
- Listed height: 6 ft 0 in (1.83 m)
- Listed weight: 210 lb (95 kg)

Career information
- High school: Carver (Chicago)
- College: Michigan (2002–2005)
- NFL draft: 2006: 4th round, 109th overall pick

Career history
- Philadelphia Eagles (2006–2013); Carolina Panthers (2014); Kansas City Chiefs (2014–2015)

Awards and highlights
- First-team All-Big Ten (2005); 2× Second-team All-Big Ten (2003, 2004); Bo Schembechler Award (2005)

Career NFL statistics
- Receptions: 346
- Receiving yards: 4,118
- Receiving touchdowns: 13
- Stats at Pro Football Reference

Jason Raye Avant (born April 20, 1983) is an American former professional football player who was a wide receiver in the National Football League (NFL). He played college football at the University of Michigan and was selected by the Philadelphia Eagles in the fourth round of the 2006 NFL draft. Avant was also a member of the Carolina Panthers and Kansas City Chiefs.

== Early life ==
Avant attended Carver Military Academy in Chicago, Illinois, graduating in 2002. He spent his freshman year of high school in Decatur, IL at MacArthur High School. While in high school at Carver, Avant played both on defense, as a free safety, and offense, as a wide receiver. He set school records for receptions (148), receiving yards (2,150), touchdowns (37), and interceptions (18). After his senior season, he was named a High School All-American at free safety. He played in the 2002 U.S. Army All-American Bowl.

== College career ==
At the University of Michigan, Avant played as a wide receiver and on special teams. He played sparingly as a freshman, but as a sophomore emerged as the Wolverines' number-two receiver, behind Braylon Edwards. During his sophomore season in 2003, Avant caught 47 passes for 772 yards. As a junior, he was the team's second leading receiver. In his senior year, Avant led the team in receptions (82), receiving yards (1,007), and receiving touchdowns (eight).

In his final two seasons, Avant was named as a candidate for the Fred Biletnikoff Award, given to the nation's top receiver. After his senior season, he was named an honorable mention All-American and was given the Bo Schembechler Award as Michigan's most valuable player.

== Professional career ==
Pre-draft measurables
Height	Weight	Arm length	Hand span	40-yard dash	20-yard shuttle	Three-cone drill	Vertical jump	Broad jump	Bench press
6 ft 0 1/2 in (1.84 m)	212 lb (96 kg)	32 in (0.81 m)	8 7/8 in (0.23 m)	4.62 s	4.19 s	7.02 s	37.0 in (0.94 m)	10 ft 4 in (3.15 m)	20 reps

=== Philadelphia Eagles ===
Avant was drafted in the fourth round of the 2006 NFL draft by the Philadelphia Eagles. The Eagles traded a sixth round draft pick and tackle Artis Hicks to the Minnesota Vikings for the pick used to take Avant. In a post-draft interview, Eagles head coach Andy Reid said Avant "has great hands, toughness, leadership; he's very intelligent and a good route runner." Scouting reports projected him as a consistent possession receiver who lacked the speed to be a deep threat.

As a part of the Eagles crowded receiving corps, Avant saw limited playing time with the offense in his rookie season. He had his best performance—four receptions for forty yards and one touchdown—in the final game of the season, while the Eagles rested their starters for the playoffs.

After the 2009 season, in which he set new career-highs in all three categories with 41 receptions for 587 yards and 3 touchdowns, Avant was named to the USA Today All-Joe Team for his stellar play in the slot position. 32 of Avant's 37 catches on third down resulted in a first down.

He was re-signed to a five-year contract on March 8, 2010. He was named the Eagles' Ed Block Courage Award recipient for 2010.

Avant was released from the Philadelphia Eagles on March 4, 2014. Avant was amongst the unexpected and controversial roster moves under Chip Kelly, which also included trading Nick Foles, releasing DeSean Jackson, trading LeSean McCoy, and re-signing Riley Cooper.

=== Carolina Panthers ===
On April 7, 2014, Avant signed a one-year deal with the Carolina Panthers. In week 2 against the Detroit Lions, Avant scored his first touchdown with the Panthers in a 24–7 win, finishing the game with five catches for 54 yards as well. It was Cam Newton's first touchdown pass of the season as he had not played in week 1.

On November 18, 2014, Avant was released by the Panthers. Coach Ron Rivera stated that Avant was released to allow more opportunities for rookie receiver Philly Brown.

=== Kansas City Chiefs ===
Avant signed with the Kansas City Chiefs in November 2014, reuniting him with his former Eagles coach Andy Reid. He finished the 2014 season with 34 receptions, 352 yards and one touchdown. On March 13, 2015, he re-signed with the Chiefs.

In Avant's 2015 season, he recorded only 15 catches for 119 yards for zero touchdowns. Avant was held without a catch in nine out of the 16 games he played. Avant had his best game of the season in a Divisional Playoff loss to the New England Patriots, recording four receptions for 69 yards.

== NFL career statistics ==
Legend
**Bold**	Career high

=== Regular season ===
Year	Team	Games		Receiving					
Year	Team	GP	GS	Tgt	Rec	Yds	Avg	Lng	TD
2006	PHI	8	3	14	7	68	9.7	18	1
2007	PHI	15	5	33	23	267	11.6	31	2
2008	PHI	15	6	57	32	377	11.8	31	2
2009	PHI	**16**	9	58	41	587	**14.3**	**58**	**3**
2010	PHI	**16**	3	76	51	573	11.2	34	1
2011	PHI	**16**	7	**81**	52	**679**	13.1	35	1
2012	PHI	14	6	76	**53**	648	12.2	39	0
2013	PHI	**16**	**13**	77	38	447	11.8	31	2
2014	CAR	11	0	40	21	201	9.6	22	1
2014	KAN	5	0	22	13	152	11.7	41	0
2015	KAN	**16**	1	24	15	119	7.9	20	0
		148	53	558	346	4,118	11.9	58	13

=== Playoffs ===
Year	Team	Games		Receiving					
Year	Team	GP	GS	Tgt	Rec	Yds	Avg	Lng	TD
2006	PHI	2	0	0	0	0	0.0	0	0
2008	PHI	**3**	**2**	**16**	**11**	**113**	10.3	21	0
2009	PHI	1	1	3	2	32	16.0	20	0
2010	PHI	1	0	9	7	93	13.3	24	**1**
2013	PHI	1	1	6	5	21	4.2	6	0
2015	KAN	2	1	5	4	69	**17.3**	**26**	0
		10	5	39	29	328	11.3	26	1

== Personal life ==
Avant is an avid Scrabble player. During Chris Berman's "Fastest Three Minutes" he referred to him as Jason "You Can't Always Get What" Avant. Avant and his wife, Stacy, live in Clementon, New Jersey. He is the son of Jerry Avant and Claudette Patrick. His brother, Edwon Simmons, was a baseball player, who was drafted by Baltimore Orioles and was a safety at San Diego State. He is now a talent scout for a sports agency in Chicago.

Avant is a Christian. Avant has spoken about his faith saying "I devoted my life to Jesus Christ on May 4, 2003. It was a day when, if you can imagine it, your eyes are opened to a whole different light. On that day, I had a consciousness of God that I never really had before. It’s sort of like being in darkness, but you finally start to see. I realized that day that all of the stuff that I learned growing up was backwards, according to the Scripture. It was the day that changed my life. I started realizing that I had a purpose, and every thought from that day on went through a filter of Jesus Christ first. Before I can make a decision I have to think, ʻWould it be pleasing to God?’".

As of 2017, Avant opened up and runs Launch, a trampoline park in Deptford Township, New Jersey. He competed on Season 10 of American Ninja Warrior.

== See also ==
- Lists of Michigan Wolverines football receiving leaders
- List of athletes from Chicago
