= Rosemary Stevenson =

American baseball player

- Outfielder
- Born: June 2, 1936; Stalwart, Michigan, U.S.
- Died: January 3, 2017 (aged 80); Nunica, Michigan, U.S.
- Batted: Left Threw: Right

Teams
- Grand Rapids Chicks (1954)

Rosemary Stevenson (June 2, 1936 – January 3, 2017) was an American outfielder who played in the All-American Girls Professional Baseball League (AAGPBL) in its final season of operation (1954). She batted left handed and threw right handed.

== Early life ==
She was born June 2, 1936, in Stalwart, Michigan.

== Baseball career ==
She played softball starting at age 11. As a 17-year-old student at Pickford High School, located in Pickford Township, Michigan, she heard about the AAGPBL and tried out. In 1954, she was assigned to the Grand Rapids Chicks, based in Grand Rapids, Michigan, playing her first game the day after her high school graduation. She played in 54 games, until the league folded later that year. She went on to play and coach softball.

In her later years Rosemary wrote an autobiography titled "Don't Die on Third".

She died January 3, 2017, in Nunica, Michigan.

== Career statistics ==
Year	G	AB	R	H	2B	3B	HR	RBI	SB	BB	SO	AVG
1954	32	82	15	19	3	0	3	27	3	4	27	.232

== See also ==
- List of All-American Girls Professional Baseball League players
- List of people from Grand Rapids, Michigan
