= Terry Rukavina =

American baseball player

- Utility player
- Born: May 14, 1931; Middletown, Ohio, U.S.
- Died: May 10, 2010 (aged 78); Middletown, Ohio, U.S.
- Batted: Right Threw: Right

Teams
- Chicago Colleens (1950); Springfield Sallies (1950); Kalamazoo Lassies (1951, 1953)

Theresa Rukavina (May 14, 1931 – May 10, 2010) was an All-American Girls Professional Baseball League player. Listed at 5' 7", 140 lb., Rukavina batted and threw right handed. She was dubbed Terry by her teammates.

Terry Rukavina was a versatile player during her three seasons in the league.

Born in Middletown, Ohio, Terry was one of eleven children in the family of George and Rose Rukavina. She was a latecomer and did not start playing until age 18 in an organized fast-pitch league, where she played every position except pitcher and catcher and was noted by an All-American league scout. She tried out for the league and was assigned to the player development camp.

Rukavina joined the Chicago Colleens and Springfield Sallies touring teams in 1950 and hit a .271 average with four home runs and 71 runs batted in in 77 games. She then filled in at many different infield and outfield positions with the Kalamazoo Lassies in 1951 and 1953, hitting 163 with one homer and 23 RBI in 147 games.

After baseball, Rukavina went to work at a steel company for 34 years and retired in 1991. In between, she was active in sport activities. As a result, she was a member of the Kalamazoo basketball team that won the state championship and played softball in her Middletown home and in the Butler County, Ohio area. She also participated in the Ladies Professional Golf Association event at Kings Island along with Jane Blalock during the 1979 Pro-Am tournament.

Terry was later inducted into the Butler County Softball Hall of Fame as part of the 1986 Class. In 1988, she received further recognition when she became part of Women in Baseball, a permanent display based at the Baseball Hall of Fame and Museum in Cooperstown, New York, which was unveiled to honor the entire All-American Girls Professional Baseball League.

Rukavina died in 2010 in Middletown, Ohio, at the age of 79.
