= Frances Vukovich =

Baseball player (born 1930)

- Born: August 30, 1930 (age 95); Smithdale, Pennsylvania, U.S.
- Bats: Left Throws: Left

Teams
- Chicago Colleens (1950); Racine Belles (1950)

Frances Vukovich (born August 30, 1930) is a former pitcher who played from 1950 through 1951 in the All-American Girls Professional Baseball League (AAGPBL). Listed at 5 ft 7 in (1.70 m), 140 lb., she batted and threw left-handed. She was nicknamed ″Be Bop″.

Born in Smithdale, Pennsylvania, Vukovich had not played any organized ball before she attended a tryout for the All-American Girls Professional Baseball League in the close city of McKeesport. She made the grade and was relocated to the Chicago Colleens player development team in 1950, being used as a pitcher because of her good fastball.

Vukovich posted a 9–9 record in 20 pitching appearances for the Colleens while hitting an average of .284 (19-for-67). Her numbers were pretty good and she was promoted to the Racine Belles in 1951. But she did not have much of a chance to pitch and was hit hard when she did it.

After her brief baseball stint, Vukovich moved to Chicago and worked for the Illinois Bell telephone company. She later moved to Los Angeles and worked for Pacific Bell until retirement in 1988.

Following retirement, Vukovich focused much of her time and energy visiting friends and family, playing golf and traveling to reunions of the AAGPBL Players Association. Since 1988 she is part of Women in Baseball, a permanent display based at the Baseball Hall of Fame and Museum in Cooperstown, New York, which was unveiled to honor the entire All-American Girls Professional Baseball League rather than individual baseball personalities.

== Pitching statistics ==
GP	W	L	W-L%	ERA	IP	H	RA	ER	BB	SO
5	0	3	.000	5.08	16	8	18	9	16	3
