= Lucella MacLean =

Canadian baseball player

- Catcher / First base / Right field
- Born: January 3, 1921; Lloydminster, Alberta, Canada
- Died: June 25, 2012 (aged 91); Lloydminster, Alberta, Canada
- Batted: Right Threw: Right

Teams
- South Bend Blue Sox (1943–1944)

Lucella MacLean [Ross] (January 3, 1921 – June 25, 2012) was a former utility who played from 1943 through 1944 in the All-American Girls Professional Baseball League (AAGPBL). She batted and threw right handed.

A native of Lloydminster, MacLean was one of the sixty eight girls from Canada who played in the AAGPBL during its 12-year history. She also was one of the sixty original players in the inaugural season of the league.

MacLean was the fourth of nine children born to Anna and John Angus MacLean. She graduated from Lloydminster High School in 1940. She started to play with the Lloydminster nationals' senior team, who won the Ester Trophy in Saskatoon from 1937 to 1940. In that year, she joined the Saskatoon Pats and helped her team to the Provincial Hunking Trophy in 1941. When MacLean was not playing she worked as a telephone clerk until 1943.

The AAGPBL was introduced in the spring of 1943. MacLean was located to the Blue Sox, playing for them two seasons as a backup for catcher Bonnie Baker. She also saw action at first base and right field, appearing in 101 games while hitting a .204 average with 25 runs batted in. In addition, she started the first triple play in AAGPBL history.

In 1945 MacLean returned to Canada to catch for the Army and Navy Pats of Edmonton. She later spent seven years in the National Girls Baseball League, playing from 1946 to 1953 for the Admiral Music Maids, Chicago Chicks, Chicago Bluebirds, Parichy Bloomer Girls and Rockola Chicks.

MacLean stayed working in the United States until 1959 and then returned to Canada. She became married in 1951 to Jesse Moore. Widowed in 1957, she married George Ross in 1960. In recognition of her athletic contribution, she was inducted into the Saskatchewan Baseball Hall of Fame and is also in the Alberta Hall of Fame and the Canadian Baseball Hall of Fame. She also is part of Women in Baseball, a permanent display based at the Baseball Hall of Fame and Museum in Cooperstown, New York. The exhibition was unveiled on November 5, 1988, to honor the entire All-American Girls Professional Baseball League rather than individual baseball personalities. In 2012, in partnership with the Ross family, Girls Prairie League Softball began awarding the MacLean-Ross Cup in MacLean's memory.
