= Shirley Danz =

American baseball player (1926–2018)

- Shortstop / Second base / Outfield
- Born: August 16, 1926; Oak Park, Illinois, U.S.
- Died: May 9, 2018 (aged 91); Hendersonville, North Carolina, U.S.
- Batted: Right Threw: Right

Teams
- Chicago Colleens (1949); Racine Belles (1950)

Career highlights and awards
- Women in Baseball – AAGPBL Permanent Display at Baseball Hall of Fame and Museum (1988)

Shirley Elizabeth Danz (August 16, 1926 – May 9, 2018) was an infielder and outfielder who played in the All-American Girls Professional Baseball League (AAGPBL). Listed at 5' 4", 130 lb., she batted and threw right handed.

Shirley Danz played during two seasons in the league before directing her abilities toward bowling as a competitor and instructor, touring on the Brunswick circuit for many years.

Born in Oak Park, Illinois, Danz started playing amateur softball in the nearby city of Forest Park at the age of thirteen. She began to play at professional level with the Cardinals team of the Chicago National Girls Baseball League, where she was spotted by an AAGPBL talent scout who invited her to a try out and was assigned to the Chicago Colleens rookie touring team for the 1949 season.

Danz played at second base and shortstop for the Colleens, and gained a promotion to the Racine Belles in 1950. She was converted into an outfielder, but her season ended abruptly when she injured herself, tripping over first base after hitting a single.

She did not return to the league in 1951, and decided to coach a girls' softball team. A few years later, she became an accomplished bowler and toured on the bowling circuit from 1961 through 1969. Although she never won a tournament, she became a skilled bowling instructor and earned a rewarding career in the years to come. She also worked at Motorola telecommunications company during 25 years, retiring in 1985.

Danz received further recognition when she became part of Women in Baseball, a permanent display based at the Baseball Hall of Fame and Museum in Cooperstown, New York, which was unveiled in 1988 to honor the entire All-American Girls Professional Baseball League.

In 1994 she suffered a heart attack and received bypass surgery in 1995. She lived her later years in Hendersonville, North Carolina. Danz died in Hendersonville, North Carolina in May 2018, at the age of 91.

== Career statistics ==
Batting

GP	AB	R	H	2B	3B	HR	RBI	SB	TB	BB	SO	BA	OBP	SLG
23	55	4	8	0	0	0	1	1	8	4	18	.145	.203	.145

Fielding

GP	PO	A	E	TC	DP	FA
23	18	0	4	22	0	.818

Note: Since the league counted the 1949 tour as exhibition games no official statistics were kept.
