= Theda Marshall =

- First base
- Born: April 24, 1925; Canton, South Dakota, U.S.
- Died: October 13, 2005 (aged 80); Lakewood, Colorado, U.S.
- Batted: Right Threw: Right

Teams
- South Bend Blue Sox (1947–1948); Chicago Colleens (1948)

Theda Marshall (April 24, 1925 – October 13, 2005) was a first basewoman who played from 1947 through 1948 in the All-American Girls Professional Baseball League (AAGPBL). Listed at 5 ft 7 in (1.70 m), 133 lb., she batted and threw right-handed.

Born in Canton, South Dakota, Theda Marshall was one of seven siblings. She started to play softball in school at age 12, and joined one of the two girls' softball teams in her town when she was 15. Then, in 1947 she was invited to attend the AAGPBL spring training held in Havana, Cuba, and after making the team she was assigned to the South Bend Blue Sox.

Marshall struggled at the plate in 1947, going 51-for-362 for a .141 average while striking out 79 times to set an all-time single-season record. In five postseason games, she went 3-for-18 for a .167 average (including a double) against the Grand Rapids Chicks, eventually the Champion Team in the final round.

Marshall opened 1948 with South Bend and was traded to the Chicago Colleens in the midseason, compiling a .140 mark in 125 games. When a softball team in Arizona offered her a more lucrative contract in 1949, Marshall jumped at the first chance she had to leave the league.

After her playing days ended, Marshall went to work as a computer technician in a government office. She later took a job at the Air Force and Finance Center in Denver, Colorado for 30 years, retiring in 1992.

Marshall was credited as a fine first basewoman and as a great basketball player. In 1992, she had to have her right rotator cuff removed from injuries during her sporting life. After that she had only 50 percent use of her right arm and became left-handed.

Theda Marshall is part of Women in Baseball, a permanent display at the Baseball Hall of Fame and Museum at Cooperstown, New York, which was unveiled in 1988 to honor the entire All-American Girls Professional Baseball League rather than individual baseball personalities. She was a longtime resident of Lakewood, Colorado, where she died at the age of 80.

== AAGPBL statistics ==
Batting

GP	AB	R	H	2B	3B	HR	RBI	SB	BB	SO	BA
238	754	53	106	16	9	0	48	34	59	139	.141

Fielding

GP	PO	A	E	TC	DP	FA
237	2607	61	80	2748	95	.971
