= List of All-American Girls Professional Baseball League players =

The following is a list of players who formed part of the All-American Girls Professional Baseball League (AAGPBL) during its twelve years of existence, from its inception in 1943 through the 1954 season.

This list presents data from an eight-year collaborative research project run by the All-American Girls Professional Baseball League Players Association and is considered to be the definitive list of all the known players of the league.

The association was largely responsible for the opening of Women in Baseball, a permanent display at the National Baseball Hall of Fame and Museum, which was unveiled in 1988 to honor the entire All-American Girls Professional Baseball League. In addition, the association recognized players who had contracts with the league, even though they may not have played a single game during their career in the circuit. All players were included on the Official AAGPBL Roster printed in 1997 and submitted to the hall.

For reasons of space, this list is broken down into five pages:

- List 1 – Velma Abbott through Shirley Crites
- List 2 – Sarah Mavis Dabbs through Julie Gutz
- List 3 – Carol Habben through Esther Lyman
- List 4 – Mary McCarty through Margaret Russo
- List 5 – Tony Sachetti through Agnes Zurkowski

== Sources ==
- All-American Girls Professional Baseball League official website – profiles search
- All-American Girls Professional Baseball League Record Book – W. C. Madden. Publisher: McFarland & Company, 2000. Format: Hardcover, 294pp. Language: English. ISBN 0-7864-0597-X
- The Women of the All-American Girls Professional Baseball League: A Biographical Dictionary – W. C. Madden. Publisher: McFarland & Company, 2005. Format: Softcover, 295 pp. Language: English. ISBN 978-0-7864-2263-0
