= Anna Mae O'Dowd =

American baseball player

Anna Mae O'Dowd (April 26, 1929 – December 26, 2018) was an American baseball player in the All-American Girls Professional Baseball League from 1949 to 1951. She both batted and threw right-handed.

== Baseball career ==
Between 1949 and 1951, Anna played professional baseball for five teams: the Kenosha Comets (in 1949), the Chicago Colleens (also in 1949), the Kalamazoo Lassies and the Racine Belles (in 1950), and a year later, in 1951, for the Battle Creek Belles. According to fellow player Lois Balchunas (Bellman), "Anna Mae O'Dowd was a catcher and was she good."

What was great for Anna about her professional baseball career—apart from participating in the game—was the travel. She had never left the Chicago area and was delighted to be able to travel so much. During her three years as a catcher for the league, she visited 27 different states. Once she left the league, later on in life, she played fast pitch softball with the Bloomer Girls of the National Girls Baseball League in Chicago. They would play at night, which meant she could still work during the day.

== Personal life and death ==
Anna Mae O'Dowd was born in Chicago, Illinois, on April 26, 1929.

In 1992, once she had retired, Anna played golf and pickleball. She still had the travel bug and visited many parts of the country. One of these trips was in 2006 when she went to Cooperstown, New York, where she attended the unveiling of the AAGPBL batter commemorative statue, in honour of the League.

O'Dowd died on December 26, 2018, at the age of 89.

== Career statistics ==
Year	G	AB	R	H	2B	3B	HR	RBI	SB	BB	SO	AVG
1949	3	1	-	0	-	-	-	-	-	-	-	.000
1950	41	106	6	23	2	0	0	10	1	9	7	.217
1951	26	68	7	9	1	0	0	5	0	7	8	.132
