= Betty Moczynski =

American baseball player

- Born: June 30, 1926; Milwaukee, Wisconsin, U.S.
- Died: October 11, 2017 (aged 91); New Berlin, Wisconsin, U.S.
- Batted: Right Threw: Right

Teams
- Rockford Peaches (1943)

Betty Moczynski (June 30, 1926 – October 11, 2017) played in the All-American Girls Professional Baseball League between 1943 and 1947. She was nicknamed Moe in the league. She both batted and threw right-handed and held the position of utility outfield.

== Early life ==
Betty was born in Milwaukee, Wisconsin on June 30, 1926. She grew up in West Allis. She was one of the original members of the league. In 1943, she did a tryout at Wrigley Field and was right away assigned to the Rockford Peaches.

== Playing professional baseball ==
During her first season playing in 1943 for the Rockford Peaches, Moe drove in 5 runs in one game, which was just one short of the record for that year. As well, she had a double, two triples and a home run along with 13 stolen bases in her sole season with the team. A year later she moved over to the National Girls Baseball League Chicago Bluebirds until 1947, as a catcher and outfielder. Moe played 16 seasons professionally. As she herself said, "we were pioneers in women's sports." Moczynski was also inducted into the Walls of Honor, which was a tribute from the Brewers to Wisconsin major league natives.

== Batting record ==
Year	G	AB	R	H	2B	3B	HR	RBI	SB	BB	SO	AVG
1943	59	208	15	36	1	2	1	27	13	17	13	.173

== Sources ==
1. 2. Linden Grove Today 3. Lacrosse Tribune
