= Dolores Wilson (baseball) =

American baseball player (1928–2022)

- Outfield
- Born: December 17, 1928; Stockton, California, U.S.
- Died: January 25, 2022 (aged 93)
- Batted: Right Threw: Left

Teams
- Peoria Redwings (1947); Chicago Colleens (1948)

Career highlights and awards
- Women in Baseball – AAGPBL Permanent Display at the Baseball Hall of Fame and Museum (unveiled in 1988)

Dolores Wilson (December 17, 1928 – January 25, 2022) was an outfielder who played in the All-American Girls Professional Baseball League (AAGPBL). She batted right handed and threw left handed.

Born in Stockton, California, Dolores Wilson entered the All American League in 1947 with the Peoria Redwings club, playing for them one season before joining the Chicago Colleens touring team in 1948.

'Dodie', as her teammates dubbed her, posted a batting average of .217 (50-for-230) over 79 games, including a double and a triple with 16 stolen bases while driving in 23 runs and scoring 17 times.

At outfield, she recorded 44 putouts with seven assists and committed eight errors in 59 total chances for a .864 fielding average.

In 1988, Dolores Wilson received further recognition when she became part of Women in Baseball, a permanent display based at the Baseball Hall of Fame and Museum in Cooperstown, New York, which was unveiled to honor the entire All-American Girls Professional Baseball League rather than any individual figure.
