= Helen Walulik =

American baseball player

- Outfield / Pitcher / Second base
- Born: May 3, 1929; Plainfield, New Jersey, United States
- Died: March 6, 2012 (aged 82); Rochester, Massachusetts, United States
- Batted: Right Threw: Right

Teams
- Muskegon Lassies (1948); Fort Wayne Daisies (1948); Chicago Colleens (1949); Kalamazoo Lassies (1950)

Helen Kiely (née Walulik; May 3, 1929 – March 6, 2012) was a pitcher and an outfield/infield utility who played in the All-American Girls Professional Baseball League (AAGPBL). Listed at 5 ft 8 in (1.73 m), 121 lb, she batted and threw right-handed.

Helen Walulik was a versatile player with three different teams for two seasons in the league and spent one year as touring player for development teams.

Born in Plainfield, New Jersey, Walulik was one of seven children of Polish immigrants, Michael and Veronica Walulik. She graduated from Plainfield High School in 1947, where she played basketball and softball for three years. As a result of her accomplishments she was named Best Female Athlete for the class of 1947. In addition to school sporting events, she played both sports for two years with the Plainfield Bobby Sockers and another two years with the Perth Amboy Cardinalettes.

Though she was primarily an outfielder, Walulik was a solid utility player, serving as spot starter and long reliever when not playing at second base.

"Hensky", as her teammates called her, entered the league in 1948 with the Muskegon Lassies, playing for them briefly before joining the Fort Wayne Daisies during the midseason. She helped Fort Wayne make the 1948 playoffs, after posting a 2–6 record and a 3.07 earned run average in 91 innings of work. The highlight of her season came when she launched her only career home run, an inside-the-park hit against the Kenosha Comets. During the off-season she worked for Diehl Manufacturing Company in New Jersey because her playing salary was not enough to live on year-round.

In 1949, Walulik was allocated to the Chicago Colleens rookie training team to acquire more experience and better professional quality. Then, she joined the Kalamazoo Lassies midway through the 1950 season, her last in the league.

Following her baseball career, Walulik played basketball for the New York Covergirls in the 1950s. She married Edmund J. Kiely in 1953. They had three children: Karen, Jill and Robert. She also worked for 22 years at Ethicon Inc. as a quality assurance technician before retiring in 1992. A grandmother of five, she was a volunteer at the Rochester Senior Center in Massachusetts.

In 1988, Walulik received further recognition when she became part of Women in Baseball, a permanent display based at the Baseball Hall of Fame and Museum in Cooperstown, New York, which was unveiled to honor the entire All-American Girls Professional Baseball League.

In 2005, Walulik moved from Lebanon Township, New Jersey to Rochester, Minnesota.

Helen Walulik Kiely died on March 6, 2012, in Rochester, Massachusetts, at the age of 82.

== Career statistics ==
Batting

GP	AB	R	H	2B	3B	HR	RBI	SB	TB	BB	SO	BA	OBP	SLG
67	131	11	20	1	0	1	10	5	24	3	13	.153	.172	.183

Pitching

GP	W	L	W-L%	ERA	IP	H	RA	ER	BB	SO	HBP	WP	WHIP
67	3	8	.273	3.28	148	127	82	54	88	48	14	3	1.45

Fielding

GP	PO	A	E	TC	DP	FA
91	48	44	9	61	4	.911

Note: Since the league counted the 1949 tour as exhibition games no official statistics were kept.
