= Florence Hay =

American baseball player

- Outfield
- Born: July 12, 1932; Chicago, Illinois, U.S.
- Died: May 24, 1982; Riverside, California
- Batted: Right Threw: Right

Teams
- Chicago Colleens (1949)

Career highlights and awards
- Women in Baseball – AAGPBL Permanent Display at the Baseball Hall of Fame and Museum (unveiled in 1988)

Florence Theresa Hay (July 12, 1932 – May 24, 1982) was an All-American Girls Professional Baseball League player.

According to All-American League data, Florence Hay played at outfield for the Chicago Colleens touring team during the 1949 season. Additional information is incomplete because there are no records available at the time of the request.

The All-American Girls Professional Baseball League folded in 1954, but there is a permanent display at the Baseball Hall of Fame and Museum at Cooperstown, New York, since 1988 that honors the entire league rather than any individual figure.
