= Janet Wiley =

- First base / Pitcher
- Born: October 12, 1933; South Bend, Indiana, US
- Died: July 10, 2010 (aged 76); South Bend, Indiana, US
- Batted: Right Threw: Right

Teams
- Chicago Colleens (1950); South Bend Blue Sox (1950–1952); Rockford Peaches (1953)

Career highlights and awards
- Championship team (1951); Women in Baseball – AAGPBL Permanent Display at Baseball Hall of Fame and Museum (1988)

Janet M. Wiley [Sears] (October 12, 1933 – July 10, 2010) was an infielder and pitcher who played from 1950 through 1953 in the All-American Girls Professional Baseball League (AAGPBL). Listed at 5 ft 4 in (1.63 m), 112 lb, she batted and threw right-handed.

A member of a champion team, Janet Wiley saw her career shortened due to a severe injury and a polemic suspension.

Born in South Bend, Indiana, Janet was one of six children. She was called ״Pee Wee״, a nickname that she acquired at an early age while playing sandlot ball with her three brothers and the boys of her neighborhood. She grew up watching her hometown South Bend Blue Sox play at Playland Park. Then she had an inside track on the league when she became a bat girl for her home team in the 1945 season. Her duties varied from collecting the bats to keeping ice water ready for the players during games. She alternated with her fellow bat girl in working for the visiting teams as well.

Wiley also participated in summer training camps sponsored by the Blue Sox. The team developed these camps to encourage South Bend girls who wished to play baseball but had no opportunities at their schools. She had many chances to play first base and decided she would do that rather than pitch as she had originally planned. When she turned 16, she was invited to a tryout and made the Blue Sox roster, even though she was still in high school.

In 1950, Wiley was allocated to the Chicago Colleens rookie training team to acquire more experience and better professional quality. She hit a .289 average for them before joining South Bend midway through the season. Best known for her fielding skills, she shared duties at first base with Dorothy Mueller. Wiley managed only 13 hits in 97 at-bats for a measly .134 average in 40 games, as she recognized in an interview with these words: She was a better batter than I was.

She improved to .221 in the Sox 1951 season, while becoming a regular at the first sack when Mueller was pitching. She also posted career numbers in games played (70), at-bats (181) and hits (40), while driving in 13 runs and scoring 11 times. With Karl Winsch at the helm, South Bend won both the pennant and the champion title for the first time in league history.

Early in the 1952 season, Wiley suffered a knee injury that sidelined her for most of the year. She was used sparingly after recovering, until she had a clash with manager Winsch toward the end of the season when he disciplined her teammate Charlene Pryer for not going in to pinch-run quickly when asked. Winsch felt Wiley was insubordinate and suspended her for 30 days. Then Janet decided she would not go back to the team. I was so angry, I wouldn't play for him anyway, she explained. The league gave her an all-out release from her contract and she returned home to South Bend. A short time later, five other players walked out in protest, leaving Winsch's team short-handed for the rest of the season.

Nevertheless, Wiley was signed by the Rockford Peaches before the 1953 season. She played in just 33 games because of recurrent knee ailments.

Wiley left the league behind and married Donald L. Sears in 1955. The couple raised six children, three boys and three girls in the Michiana area centered on South Bend. She always thought that her experience in the league helped her as a mother. It helped me to encourage our girls to be whatever they wanted to be and the boys to respect them for it, she proudly explained.

After her baseball days, Janet coached junior softball for ten years, attended AAGPBL Players Association reunions, and enjoyed woodworking and gardening. Besides this, she stayed in her hometown and watched over her nine grandchildren and three great-grandchildren.

Since 1988 she is part of Women in Baseball, a permanent display based at the Baseball Hall of Fame and Museum in Cooperstown, New York, which was unveiled to honor the entire All-American Girls Professional Baseball League.

Janet Wiley Sears died in South Bend, Indiana, at the age of 76. She is buried at Southlawn Cemetery in Centre Township, Indiana.

== Career statistics ==
Batting

| GP | AB | R | H | 2B | 3B | HR | RBI | SB | BB | SO | BA | OBP |
|---|---|---|---|---|---|---|---|---|---|---|---|---|
| 147 | 380 | 31 | 74 | 5 | 2 | 0 | 25 | 7 | 31 | 69 | .195 | .255 |

Pitching

| GP | W | L | W-L% | ERA | IP | H | RA | ER | BB | SO |
|---|---|---|---|---|---|---|---|---|---|---|
| 1 | 0 | 0 | .000 | 0.00 | 1 | 0 | 0 | 0 | 0 | 0 |

Fielding

| GP | PO | A | E | TC | DP | FA |
|---|---|---|---|---|---|---|
| 127 | 1086 | 48 | 34 | 1168 | 41 | .971 |
