= Joan Sindelar =

Joan Sindelar (August 29, 1931 – April 12, 2003) played in the All-American Girls Professional Baseball League between 1949 and 1953 in the positions of first base and utility outfield. She was born in Chicago and her nickname was Jo Jo. Listed at 5 ft 7 in (1.63 m), 125 lb., she batted and threw right-handed. She is recorded to have said that playing in the league was one of the best things that happened to her in her life.

== Baseball teams ==
Joan played for the Chicago Colleens (in 1949 and 1950), Kalamazoo Lassies (from 1950–1953).

== Post-baseball career ==
Following her baseball career, Joan taught in schools in Kalamazoo, Michigan and Phoenix, Arizona. She was remembered by her students, having made a "profound impact" on them. She was an active golfer, joined a country club and became a champion. She won two annual memorial tournaments four club championships.

Once she retired from teaching, Joan adopted a rural life in which she raised animals that she sold. She was known to take in a whole array of strays which she nurtured back to health. She really enjoyed working her yard, feeding birds and growing flowers.

When she died at age 71, she was survived by Yvonne Jacques, three nieces residing in Chicago, and many great nieces and nephews.

== Career statistics ==
Year	G	AB	R	H	2B	3B	HR	RBI	SB	BB	SO	AVG
1949	-	-	-	-	-	-	-	-	-	-	-	-
1950	72	273	50	70	4	1	2	42	15	58	20	.260
1951	45	-73	10	9	4	1	0	2	1	17	24	.123
1952	-10	-	-	-	-	-	-	-	-	-	-	-
1953	81	246	25	55	7	0	0	14	3	27	40	.224
