= Elma Steck =

American baseball player (1923–2014)

- Outfielder
- Born: May 3, 1923; Columbus, Ohio, U.S.
- Died: July 22, 2014 (aged 91); Sun City, Arizona, U.S.
- Batted: Left Threw: Right

Teams
- Peoria Redwings (1948); Rockford Peaches (1949–1950); Chicago Colleens (1949); Springfield Sallies (1949)

Elma Steck Weiss (May 3, 1923 – July 22, 2014) was an outfielder who played in the All-American Girls Professional Baseball League (AAGPBL). Listed at 5' 4", 120 lb., Elma batted left-handed and threw right-handed. She was born in Columbus, Ohio, and was nicknamed "El".

== Baseball ==
Steck played for the Peoria Redwings, Rockford Peaches, Chicago Colleens and Springfield Sallies in parts of three seasons spanning 1948–1950.

Discussing the movie made about the league, A League of Their Own, she described her time playing as being "wonderful, but of course we didn't know it was going to be history. We just thought we were going to have a good time playing.” During her time in the league she traveled extensively. About that, she explained, "on the road we had a little time we could go to the movies and shop, but there was a game every single night, unless it rained and sometimes double headers.”

== Other activities ==
Following her baseball career, she became a teacher. She earned two doctorates in physical education and taught for three decades at Phoenix College, retiring in 1984. In addition to teaching she served as its Women's Athletic Director. She then taught in a part-time basis until retiring for good in 1993.

In 1951, she married Ken Weiss, a catcher who played in the Chicago Cubs and Philadelphia Athletics Minor League system. The couple raised a family of four: Dan, Mike, Lynne and Cindy, and had six grandchildren.

In addition, she served in the US Navy from 1944 through 1946. After retiring, she played golf and attended the AAGPBL annual reunions.

Elma died in 2014 in Sun City, Arizona, where she lived, at the age of 91.

== Career statistics ==
GP	AB	R	H	2B	3B	HR	RBI	SB	BB	SO	BA	OBP
17	33	1	2	0	0	0	1	1	3	7	.061	.139
