= Eunice Taylor =

American baseball player (1934–2009)

Eunice Taylor [Tuffy] (February 12, 1934 – May 8, 2009) was an American female catcher who played in the All-American Girls Professional Baseball League (AAGPBL).

Taylor was born in Racine, Wisconsin on February 12, 1934. She grew up in Kenosha, Wisconsin and tried out for the league as a 15-year-old, but was rejected due to her age.

She was picked up the following year by the Chicago Colleens, a barnstorming promotional team that played games across the United States and Canada playing games against the Springfield Sallies. She played for the Kenosha Comets in 1951. During her two seasons in the league, Taylor played in 85 games, with a .182 batting average and 25 RBI. As catcher she had 80 putouts and 18 assists to go along with 9 errors.

The league was popularized in the 1992 movie A League of Their Own, and Taylor was reportedly the inspiration for the character played by Rosie O'Donnell in the film.

In a 2005 interview, Taylor recounted how she and her brother learned the sport from their baseball-loving father. She enjoyed traveling across the country to play games and having the opportunity to see the Northeastern United States, though she was a bit homesick for her family. Taylor played a three-inning game in Yankee Stadium, the highlight of her baseball career, where she had a chance to meet Yogi Berra and Connie Mack.

== Death ==
Taylor died in her sleep, aged 75, at her home in Mount Dora, Florida on May 8, 2009.

She is survived by Diana Walega, her partner of 45 years; her brother, Donald Taylor of Tampa; four nieces and one nephew.
