= Helen Westerman =

American baseball player (1926–2006)

- Catcher
- Born: September 10, 1926; Springfield, Illinois, US
- Died: November 4, 2006 (aged 80); Springfield, Illinois, US
- Batted: Right Threw: Right

Teams
- Kenosha Comets (1943); Rockford Peaches (1944)

Helen Louise Westerman [Austin] (September 10, 1926 – November 4, 2006) was a catcher who played in the All-American Girls Professional Baseball League (AAGPBL). Listed at 5 ft 7 in (1.70 m), 118 lb, she batted and threw right-handed.

Helen Westerman was one of the original Kenosha Comets founding members of the All-American Girls Professional Baseball League in its 1943 inaugural season.

Born in Springfield, Illinois, Helen was the daughter of Lewis and Rose (née Grey) Westerman. A graduate from Feitshans High School, she started practicing baseball with her two older brothers in a male team at age 14, where she earned the nickname ״Pee Wee״ because she was too small to compete. The next year she joined an organized girls softball league, where she developed her ability to both receive and call games while catching for the Madison Furniture Company team.

One of her teammates, Elise Harney, was a solid pitcher who formed with Westerman one of the best batteries in the league. Harney, who had aroused the attention of an AAGPBL scout, told the scout that she needed Westerman as a catcher, so the league invited her as well to the final tryouts at Wrigley Field. Westerman and Harney both made the cut and were assigned to the Kenosha team.

Westerman would receive $55 a week during a three-month, 108-game season. It was a good salary, considering the average full-time worker made $1,299 a year in the 1940s, according to one estimate – or about $25 a week.

She posted a modest .189 batting average in her rookie season, but led all catchers in fielding average (.956), putouts (395) and games played (82). She also finished second for the most assists (60) and double plays (8), being surpassed only by South Bend Blue Sox's Mary Baker (72) and Racine Belles' Dorothy Maguire (9), respectively. In addition, during the midseason she caught a doubleheader in South Bend and went on to work over 20 innings.

The next year Westerman was assigned to the Rockford Peaches and was given a raise to $75 a week. Unfortunately, she was forced to leave the league to take care of her ill mother. She later played a couple of seasons for the Chicago Cardinals and Chicago Bluebirds in the rival National Girls Baseball League.

Following her baseball career, Westerman worked and managed a Walgreens lunch counter. She then was employed in the Stewart-Warner auto parts factory for 27 years, retiring in 1989. While working there, she helped organize the United Auto Workers. After that, she joined friend Louise Taplin and operated a restaurant business at White Oaks Mall for 16 years. She married Morris Austin, but was widowed a short time later and did not have children.

She is part of Women in Baseball, a permanent display based at the Baseball Hall of Fame and Museum in Cooperstown, New York, which was unveiled in 1988 to honor the entire All-American Girls Professional Baseball League rather than individual baseball personalities.

Helen Westerman died in her homeland of Springfield, Illinois at the age of 80. She is buried at Oak Hill Cemetery in Springfield.

== Career statistics ==
Batting

GP	AB	R	H	2B	3B	HR	RBI	SB	TB	BB	SO	BA	OBP	SLG
82	263	36	48	3	1	0	21	20	53	15	14	.183	.227	.202

Fielding

GP	PO	A	E	TC	DP	FA
81	395	60	21	476	8	.956
