= Dolores Moore =

- First base / Second base
- Born: October 27, 1932; Chicago, Illinois, U.S.
- Died: August 31, 2000 (aged 67); Bensenville, Illinois, U.S.
- Batted: Right Threw: Right

Teams
- Grand Rapids Chicks (1953–1954)

Career highlights and awards
- Championship team (1953); All-Star Game (1954)

Dolores Moore ["Dee"] (October 27, 1932 – August 31, 2000) was an infielder who played from 1953 through 1954 in the All-American Girls Professional Baseball League (AAGPBL). Listed at 5 ft 7 in (1.70 m), 153 lb., she batted and threw right-handed.

Born in Chicago, Illinois, Moore enjoyed playing sandlot baseball with her brother Tom when she was five years old. Later during her youth she was playing at Humboldt Park, where future Hall of Fame Rogers Hornsby told her she should play in the All-American Girls Professional Baseball League, but she was too young for league, though.

When Moore turned 16, she was recruited by the league, but her mother would not let her go because of all the travel. She instead gained experience in the National Girls Baseball League of Chicago during four years, where legendary athlete Jesse Owens presented her with the league's Most Valuable Player Award in 1952. By then, Woody English went to the AAGPBL as a manager with the Grand Rapids Chicks and invited her to come along.

In 1953 Moore became a member of the Chicks, playing for them at first base and second base depending on her team's needs. A solid hitter and fielder, in one game she drove in six runs. She helped Grand Rapids win the Championship Title in that season, batting five hits with four RBI in six playoff games. As a member of the champion team, she faced the All-Stars in the 1954 All-Star Game.

After the league folded in 1954, Moore received a contract to play with the Bill Allington All-Stars traveling team, but she turned it down because she went to work and started playing other sports. She then joined the Refiner's Pride, a women's professional basketball team that played exhibition games against the Harlem Globetrotters and various NBA teams. She also worked for the Chicago Department of Education as a playground teacher during 31 years before retiring in 1993. In the interim, she participated in bowling, golf and fishing activities. After retiring, she volunteered at a local hospital.

Dolores Moore is part of Women in Baseball, a permanent display based at the Baseball Hall of Fame and Museum in Cooperstown, New York, which was unveiled in 1988 to honor the entire All-American Girls Professional Baseball League. She died in Bensenville, Illinois, at the age of 67.

== Statistics ==
Batting

| GP | AB | R | H | 2B | 3B | HR | RBI | SB | BB | SO | BA | OBP |
|---|---|---|---|---|---|---|---|---|---|---|---|---|
| 149 | 477 | 46 | 114 | 8 | 0 | 3 | 57 | 10 | 33 | 39 | .239 | .288 |

Fielding

| GP | PO | A | E | TC | DP | FA |
|---|---|---|---|---|---|---|
| 135 | 921 | 105 | 27 | 1053 | 64 | .974 |
