= Betty Tucker =

American baseball player

- Pitcher
- Born: January 28, 1924; Detroit, Michigan, U.S.
- Died: August 20, 2012 (aged 88); Tucson, Arizona, U.S.

debut
- 1946

Last appearance
- 1949

Teams
- Peoria Redwings (1946); Fort Wayne Daisies (1947); Rockford Peaches (1947); Grand Rapids Chicks (1947); Chicago Colleens (1948); Peoria Redwings (1949)

Eulah Elizabeth Tucker (January 28, 1924 – August 20, 2012) was a pitcher who played from 1946 through 1949 in the All-American Girls Professional Baseball League (AAGPBL). Listed at 5' 4", 123 lb., she batted and threw right-handed.

A native of Detroit, Michigan, Tucker received an invitation in 1946 to participate in the AAGPBL spring training held at Pascagoula, Mississippi. After making the league tryout, she was allocated to the Peoria Redwings. A hard-thrower underhand pitcher, Tucker struggled through the many stages of the league, including shifting from underhand (1946) to sidearm (1947) to overhand (1948) pitching, although she hurled on awful expansion teams that did not give her much run support.

After a year in Peoria, Tucker opened 1947 with the Fort Wayne Daisies and then found herself on the move again, this time to the Rockford Peaches and then the Grand Rapids Chicks. The next year she joined the Chicago Colleens, and returned to the Redwings in 1949, her last AAGPBL season. After that, Tucker pitched in 1950 for the Rockola Chicks of the rival National Girls Baseball League, which was based in Chicago, and remained underhand pitching through 1953. At the time, many AAGPBL players also joined the NGBL because of better salaries and in some cases for not being on the road as much was also important.

The AAGPBL folded in 1954, but there is a permanent display at the Baseball Hall of Fame and Museum at Cooperstown, New York, since November 5, 1988 that honors them.

Tucker was a long time resident of Tucson, Arizona, where she died in 2012 at the age of 88.
