= Arlene Kotil =

American baseball player (1934–2022)

- First base
- Born: May 22, 1934; Chicago, Illinois, U.S.
- Died: May 27, 2022 (aged 88); Palos Heights, Illinois, U.S.
- Batted: Left Threw: Left

Teams
- Chicago Colleens (1949); Muskegon Lassies (1950); South Bend Blue Sox (1950–1951)

Career highlights and awards
- Championship team (1951); Women in Baseball – AAGPBL Permanent Display at Baseball Hall of Fame and Museum (1988)

Arlene Kotil (May 22, 1934 – May 27, 2022) was an infielder who played in the All-American Girls Professional Baseball League (AAGPBL). She batted and threw left-handed.

== Biography ==
Born in Chicago, Illinois, Arlene Kotil started playing organized softball at age 16 for the Blue Island Stars, one of four teams in the defunct All-American Girls minor league of Chicago.

Kotil joined the All-American Girls Professional Baseball League in 1949 while still attending high school. She was assigned to the Chicago Colleens/Springfield Sallies rookie touring teams in order to develop her skills. Basically a line drive hitter, she covered first base for her hometown team, playing in over 50 cities across 16 states from New York City south through Florida throughout the midwest and south into Texas. The Colleens and the Sallies played over 75 exhibition games against each other between June and September of that year. One of her highlights during the trip was hitting an inside-the-park home run against Springfield to tie a game at 7–7 in the eighth inning.

Kotil was promoted to the Muskegon Lassies in 1950. During the midseason, the league was losing money and fans, and the teams and host cities were changing almost every year. By the time, baseball was booming in Kalamazoo, Michigan. This was a good fact for Kalamazoo, as the city was granted the Lassies franchise on a trial basis when the city of Muskegon could no longer support them. Then, Kotil was sent to the South Bend Blue Sox in the same transaction that brought pitcher Lillian Faralla to the Kalamazoo Lassies.

The next year she was a member of the 1951 Blue Sox champion team, even though she did not play during the postseason.

Arlene Kotil is part of Women in Baseball, a permanent display based at the Baseball Hall of Fame and Museum in Cooperstown, New York, which was unveiled in 1988 to honor the entire All-American Girls Professional Baseball League.

At the time of her death, she was residing in Palos Heights, Illinois.

== Career statistics ==
Batting

| GP | AB | R | H | 2B | 3B | HR | RBI | SB | TB | BB | SO | BA | OBP | SLG |
|---|---|---|---|---|---|---|---|---|---|---|---|---|---|---|
| 83 | 244 | 21 | 50 | 5 | 1 | 0 | 21 | 10 | 57 | 30 | 64 | .292 | OBP | .234 |

Fielding

| GP | PO | A | E | TC | DP | FA |
|---|---|---|---|---|---|---|
| 82 | 177 | 20 | 39 | 236 | 33 | .977 |

Note: Since the league counted the 1950 tour as exhibition games no official statistics were kept.
