= Betty Whiting =

- First base / Outfield / Catcher
- Born: November 13, 1925; Ida Township, Michigan, U.S.
- Died: February 10, 1967 (aged 41); Battle Creek, Michigan, U.S.
- Batted: Right Threw: Right
- Stats at Baseball Reference

Teams
- Milwaukee Chicks (1944); Grand Rapids Chicks (1945–1946); Fort Wayne Daisies (1947); Chicago Colleens (1948); South Bend Blue Sox (1948–1950); Kalamazoo Lassies (1950–1951); Battle Creek Belles (1951–1952)

Career highlights and awards
- AAGPBL champion (1944)

Elizabeth Jane Whiting (November 13, 1925 – February 10, 1967) was a utility who played from 1944 through 1952 in the All-American Girls Professional Baseball League (AAGPBL). Listed at 5 ft 6 in (1.68 m), 147 lb., Whiting batted and threw right-handed. She was born in Ida, Michigan.

Betty Whiting was a valuable utility in the All-American Girls Professional Baseball League, playing mainly at first base for seven different teams in a span of nine seasons. She joined the league in 1944, as starting shortstop for the Milwaukee Chicks. By 1946 she was playing first base for the Grand Rapids Chicks.

After that, Whiting played through 1952 for the Grand Rapids Chicks, Fort Wayne Daisies, Chicago Colleens, South Bend Blue Sox, Kalamazoo Lassies and Battle Creek Belles, for whom she also caught and played in the outfield.

Her most productive season came in 1952, when she posted career numbers with a .231 batting average and 79 hits, while driving in 28 runs and scoring 38 times in 104 games. She also led the league in being hit by pitches in two years, while in 1946 she committed only 13 errors at first base to lead all first sackers in fielding average (.989).

A member of the 1944 Milwaukee champion team, Whiting also appeared in four postseasons (1945–46, 1948–49). In 1988, she became part of Women in Baseball, a permanent display based at the Baseball Hall of Fame and Museum in Cooperstown, New York, which was unveiled to honor the entire All-American Girls Professional Baseball League.

Whiting died in Battle Creek, Michigan at the age of 41, when she fell down the stairway to her cellar.

== Batting statistics ==
| GP | AB | R | H | 2B | 3B | HR | RBI | SB | BB | SO | BA | OBP |
|---|---|---|---|---|---|---|---|---|---|---|---|---|
| 943 | 2947 | 311 | 561 | 64 | 17 | 3 | 232 | 198 | 422 | 303 | .190 | .292 |
