= Smithdale, Pennsylvania =

Unincorporated community in Pennsylvania, US

- Unincorporated community
- Location within the state of Pennsylvania Smithdale (the United States)
- Coordinates: 40°13′40″N 79°47′29″W
- Country: United States
- State: Pennsylvania
- County: Allegheny
- Township: Elizabeth
- Elevation: 794 ft (242 m)
- Time zone: UTC-5 (Eastern (EST))
  - Summer (DST): UTC-4 (EDT)
- GNIS feature ID: 1204671

Smithdale is an unincorporated community and coal town in Allegheny County, Pennsylvania, United States. It is located in Elizabeth Township in the southeastern corner of Allegheny County, along the south bank of the Youghiogheny River. Immediately to the southeast is Collinsburg in Westmoreland County. To the north across the river is Sutersville, also in Westmoreland County.
