= Doris Tetzlaff =

- Third base / Utility / Chaperone / Coach
- Born: January 1, 1921; Watertown, Wisconsin
- Died: April 11, 1998 (aged 77); Iola, Wisconsin
- Batted: Right Threw: Right

Teams
- Milwaukee Chicks (1944); Grand Rapids Chicks (1945–1947); Chicago Colleens (1948); Fort Wayne Daisies (1948); Muskegon Lassies (1949); Fort Wayne Daisies (1950–1953)

Career highlights and awards
- Two-time Championship Team (1944, 1947)

Doris Tetzlaff [″Tetz″] (January 1, 1921 – April 11, 1998) was an infielder and chaperone in the All-American Girls Professional Baseball League (AAGPBL). Listed at 5'5", 155 lb., she batted and threw right-handed.

Little is known about this woman who played different roles during ten years in the All-American Girls Professional Baseball League. A native of Watertown, Wisconsin, Tetzlaff came from a family of German origin. She was a valuable utility, playing mainly at third base for five different teams from 1944 through 1948.

Tetzlaff entered the league in 1944 with the Milwaukee Chicks, playing for them one year before joining the Grand Rapids Chicks (1945–1947), Chicago Colleens (1948), Fort Wayne Daisies (1948) and Muskegon Lassies (1949). She returned to the Daisies in 1950, serving as a chaperone and assistant coach for managers Jimmie Foxx and Bill Allington until the 1953 season.

Tetzlaff also went to the playoffs in all of her ten seasons in the league, being a member of two champion teams in 1944 and 1947. She is also part of the AAGPBL permanent display at the Baseball Hall of Fame and Museum at Cooperstown, New York, opened in 1988, which is dedicated to the entire league rather than any individual player.

Doris Tetzlaff died in Iola, Wisconsin, at the age of 77.

== Batting statistics ==
GP	AB	R	H	2B	3B	HR	RBI	SB	TB	BB	SO	BA	OBP	SLG
625	2065	267	391	29	15	4	161	284	462	399	262	.190	.322	.225
