= W. C. Madden =

American journalist and author

W.C. Madden is a retired journalist, teacher and author who has written multiple books about baseball, including two about the AAGPBL. He has also written about the Western League and the College World Series. While much of his work is based on baseball, he has also written about the history of Indianapolis, Indiana.

== Partial list of books authored and co-authored ==
- All-American Girls Professional Baseball League Record Book
- Baseball's 1st-Year Player Draft, Team by Team Through 1999
- Baseball in Indianapolis
- Baseball Stories for the Soul
- Crown Hill Cemetery
- Haynes-Apperson and America’s First Practical Automobile: A History
- Indianapolis
- Indianapolis In Vintage Postcards
- Monticello
- P.S. Remembering Bush Stadium
- The College World Series
- The College World Series: A Baseball History, 1947-2003
- The Dutiful Dozen
- The Hoosiers of Summer
- The Indy 500: 1956-1965
- The Western League: A Baseball History, 1885 through 1999
- The Women of the All-American Girls Professional Baseball League
