= Jane Stoll =

American baseball player (1928–2000)

- Born: August 8, 1928; West Point, Pennsylvania, U.S.
- Died: May 27, 2000 (aged 71); Phoenix, Arizona, U.S.
- Batted: Right Threw: Right

Career statistics
- Batting average: .247
- Runs scored: 319
- Hits: 651
- Runs batted in: 12

Teams
- Peoria Redwings (1946); Grand Rapids Chicks (1947); Springfield Sallies (1948); South Bend Blue Sox (1949–1952); Kalamazoo Lassies (1953–1954)

Career highlights and awards
- All-Star Team (1953); Three Championship teams (1947, 1952, 1954)

Jane "Jeep" Stoll (August 8, 1928 – May 27, 2000) was an outfielder who played from 1946 through 1954 in the All-American Girls Professional Baseball League (AAGPBL). Listed at 5' 2", 135 lb., she batted and threw right-handed.

An All-Star and veteran of three champion clubs, Jane Stoll was a steady player whom managers could use as a starter, utility, or pinch-hitter. She could play well in all three outfield positions, mainly at center field, and was noted by her enthusiastic, positive, and hard team working. She made the most of her opportunities and averaged .247 lifetime during her nine-year career in the All-American Girls Professional Baseball League. A .140 hitter in her rookie season, she gradually improved her hitting to go along with her defense, batting over .300 in each of her last three years in the league. In addition, her career 312 runs batted in ties her with Joanne Weaver for 12th on the all-time list.

== Early life ==
A native of West Point, Pennsylvania, Stoll played softball in the local teams during her high school years, where an AAGPBL scout spotted her and decided to talk to her parents about joining the league. She attended to spring training in 1946 after graduating from school and was rewarded with a contract to play with the Peoria Redwings.

For the first time in 1946, league pitching rules were relaxed enough to allow for a limited sidearm pitch from an underhand delivery with certain restrictions. The season saw the rapid development of many pitchers as the adoption of the new pitching style became general. Stoll struggled in her rookie season, hitting .164 in 58 games for last-place Peoria (33-79) in the eight-team league.

In 1947 the AAGPBL moved its spring training camp to Havana, Cuba, and Stoll was one of the two hundred girls who made the trip, this time as a member of the Grand Rapids Chicks. The girls trained, played eight days of exhibitions, and were cheered by more than 75,000 fans during games at the Gran Stadium. The new rules applied during the regular season permitted a full sidearm pitching delivery, and many players who developed hitting underhand pitching had problems adjusting to the new pitching style. As a result of the pitching domination, Dorothy Kamenshek was the champion bat with a significant .306 average, Audrey Wagner was the leader with seven home runs, and Elizabeth Mahon topped all hitters with 53 runs batted in. That season, Stoll collected a .163 average with 16 runs and 12 RBI in 71 games, while Grand Rapids finished second (65-47) and advanced to playoffs. In the first round, the Chicks disposed of the South Bend Blue Sox in five games, and beat the Racine Belles in seven games, to clinch the championship.

The AAGPBL grew to an all-time peak of ten teams in 1948, representing Eastern and Western zones; just in the first year, the circuit shifted to overhand pitching. At the time, the league shifted players as needed to help teams stay afloat, and Stoll was involved in the move. She was allocated to the Springfield Sallies to bolster the new squad. But the helpless Sallies finished as the worst team in the league, getting roughed up as a last-place expansion club with a 41–84 record, ending 35 and a half games behind Racine in the Western Division. The only regular to have a significant year for them was Evelyn Wawryshyn, who tied for sixth place in the league with a .266 batting average while ranking among the top ten hitters in stolen bases, hits, and 126 total bases. The pitching staff was led by the durable Doris Barr, who posted a decent 2.68 ERA with a career-high 116 strikeouts despite her 7–19 record. In her first shot as an everyday outfielder, Stoll hit .191 with 18 RBI and set career-highs with 61 runs scored and 116 games. The ill-fated Sallies folded at the end of the season, and Stoll was dealt to the South Bend team.

When Stoll joined the Blue Sox in 1949 she took advantage of his new environment from the very beginning, raising her average to .232, while scoring 50 runs with 28 RBI in 99 games appearances. Throughout the regular season, South Bend waged an up-and-down battle with Rockford for first place. Although South Bend had a four-game lead in August, both clubs tied with identical records of 75–36 at the end of the year. On September 3, in the final home game of the regular season, Jean Faut of South Bend hurled a no-hitter, a 2–0 victory against the Fort Wayne Daisies, advancing her team to a tie for first place. In the first round of the playoffs, Grand Rapids defeated Fort Wayne in three games, and the Kenosha Comets were swept by the Muskegon Lassies. Then, in the semi-finals South Bend beat Muskegon (3-0) and Rockford did the same with Grand Rapids (3-1). The best-of-seven-series was clinched by Rockford, who eliminated South Bend in four straight games. By edict of league president Max Carey, the playoff victory also made Rockford the regular season champion.

In 1950 Stoll continued her batting progress, raising her average to .271 while driving in 50 runs and scoring 40 times in 91 games. South Bend finished fifth with a 55–55 record, out of contention.

By the time the 1951 season rolled around, Stoll was one of the established starters in the South Bend outfield, appearing in 101 of the 111 games of her team. She posted a .268 average with 46 runs and 47 RBI while sharing outfield duties with Elizabeth Mahon and Betty Wagoner. While South Bend placed third in the first-half standings, the team finished first in the second half, thus giving them a playoff berth. Their complete season record of 75 and 36 was the best in the league that year. South Bend defeated Fort Wayne in the first round of the playoffs, two games to one, while Rockford swept Grand Rapids in two games. In the best-of-five championship round, defending AAGPBL champion, Rockford won the first two games over the visiting South Bend, who won the next three games. In the 10–2 finale, Wagoner paced the Blue Sox with four hits, and Faut earned the victory in a seven-inning relief, while Charlene Pryer and Stoll contributed three hits each. Considering that Rockford had won nine straight games, including the first two games in the championship series, South Bend came away a surprise winner to clinch the club's first AAGPBL title in the league.

In 1952 Stoll topped the .300 mark for the first time, hitting .301 with 45 and 60 RBI, though she appeared in only 86 games. South Bend finished second (64-45) in the six-team league, but dissension within the Blue Sox peaked just before the season ended when infielder Pryer was disciplined following a dispute with manager Karl Winsch. In support of Pryer, five South Bend teammates, including Mahon and Stoll, joined her in a walkout, leaving Winsch's team short-handed for the playoffs with only twelve players. Nonetheless, South Bend beat Grand Rapids in two games and later defeated Rockford in five games to win a second consecutive title in the league. Stoll played with the Kalamazoo Lassies for the rest of her career. Her most productive season came in 1953 when she hit a career-high .308 with 38 runs in 110 games and also posted career numbers in at-bats (396), hits (122), and RBI (65), being selected for the All-Star Team. In the end, Kalamazoo finished in third place with a 56–50 mark and advanced to the playoffs, thanks to an improved lineup boosted by a good mixture of veteran players like Doris Sams, Dorothy Schroeder, Fern Shollenberger, and the newcomer Stoll, along with younger players like Jean Lovell and Nancy Mudge. Gloria Cordes and June Peppas were the top pitchers of the team. In the first round, Kalamazoo beat Fort Wayne in three games but was swept in two games by Grand Rapids in the final series.

Stoll saw reduced playing time in 1954, but she responded with a .302 average in just 34 games, while Kalamazoo would win the only AAGPBL Championship in five years of team history. With the league reduced to five teams, due partly to financial problems and the difficulty of recruiting new players, the Lassies posted a fourth-place record of 48–49. In the first round of the playoffs, Kalamazoo defeated the second-place South Bend (48-44), two to one games, behind the strong pitching of Nancy Warren and Elaine Roth. In the final round, Kalamazoo surprised the heavily favored Fort Wayne, three to two games, thanks to a clutch hitting of Chris Ballingall and Carol Habben, appropriately dubbed the Home Run Twins, and a nice hurling performance by Peppas in decisive Game 5, during what turned out to be the league's final season.

== Life after baseball ==
After the league folded, Stoll owned her own dog grooming business in Chicago, Illinois for many years. She then moved to Phoenix, Arizona in 1984, where she worked for AT&T until her retirement in 1995. She is part of Women in Baseball, the AAGPBL permanent display at the Baseball Hall of Fame and Museum at Cooperstown, New York, which was unveiled on November 5, 1988 in honor of the entire league rather than individual baseball personalities. It was a neglected chapter of sports history, at least until 1992, when filmmaker Penny Marshall premiered her film A League of Their Own, which was a fictionalized account of activities in the AAGPBL. Starring Geena Davis, Tom Hanks, Madonna, Lori Petty and Rosie O'Donnell, this film brought a rejuvenated interest to the extinct league.

Jane Stoll died in her home in Arizona at the age of 71.
