= Nancy Warren (baseball) =

- Pitcher / Infielder
- Born: June 13, 1921; Springfield, Ohio, U.S.
- Died: June 1, 2001 (aged 79); Southfield, Michigan, U.S.
- Batted: Right Threw: Right

debut
- 1946

Last appearance
- 1954

Teams
- Muskegon Lassies (1946–'48); Chicago Colleens (1948); Peoria Redwings (1949–1951); Fort Wayne Daisies (1951–'52); Muskegon Belles (1953); Kalamazoo Lassies (1954)

Career highlights and awards
- Championship Title (1954); All-Star Team (1954)

Nancy Warren (June 13, 1921 – June 1, 2001) was a pitcher and infielder who played from 1946 through 1954 for six different teams of the All-American Girls Professional Baseball League (AAGPBL). Listed at 5 ft 5 in (1.65 m), 130 lb., she batted and threw right-handed. Hank was a nickname she picked up as a youth.

== Early life ==
A native of Springfield, Ohio, Nancy Warren used to play baseball with her four brothers in their home's backyard at an early age. She joined her first organized fastpitch softball team after turning 14, juggling positions on the field as a pitcher and at shortstop. She later played softball for the Fink and Heine Packers team in a national tournament, where she were recruited by an AAGPBL scout. Warren was given a tryout during the 1946 spring training held at Pascagoula, Mississippi, and was allocated to the Muskegon Lassies as a shortstop.

== AAGPBL career ==
=== 1946-1950 seasons ===
Since the Lassies already had an overloaded infield, Warren was benched most of the time. Halfway through the season she demanded an opportunity to play or be traded, and Muskegon manager Buzz Boyle gave her the opportunity to pitch and play at infield. Unfortunately, Warren broke an ankle in the process and lost the rest of the season. In April 1947, all of the league's players were flown to Havana, Cuba, for spring training. After that, the teams paired off and played exhibition games, traveling by train to their home cities. That exhibition schedule helped get the players ready for the opening of regular season games in the last week of May. New Muskegon manager Bill Wambsganss assumed he might use Warren in the pitching rotation. She did well, going 17–11 with 93 strikeouts and a 1.13 earned run average in 31 games.

Warren started 1948 in good form, but was dealt to the expansion Chicago Colleens during the midseason. At the time the league shifted players in anytime as needed to help new teams stay afloat. She posted a combined 12–5 record for a .706 winning percentage while striking out 86 batters. Chicago had a horrendous record and folded at the end of the season. She found herself on the move again, this time to the Peoria Redwings the next year. Every time they wanted to booster a team, they'd transfer you, Warren recalled in an interview. Nevertheless, she enjoyed to play in Peoria, even though she had negative numbers with the Redwings after leading the league in losses (16), runs allowed (92) and earned runs (64) in 1949. She rebounded in 1950, going 18–18 with 86 strikeouts and a 2.41 ERA in 32 pitching appearances with Peoria.

=== 1951-1953 seasons ===
During the 1951 midseason Warren was sent to the Fort Wayne Daisies. In her new team she had plenty of run support from her teammates, thanks to a lineup that included the explosive bats of Betty Foss, Jean Geissinger, Katie Horstman, Dorothy Schroeder and Joanne Weaver, which led to her best ever winning record of 17–6 (.739). In 1952, she went 17–7 with a 2.46 ERA and finished second in the league with 91 SO (23 behind leader Jean Faut). Unfortunately, Warren experienced her worst season in 1953 with a 6–17 record after being traded to the helpless Muskegon Belles.

=== 1954 season ===
Warren was traded to the Kalamazoo Lassies in 1954, during what turned out to be the All-American Girls Professional Baseball League's final season. For the second time, she inadvertently found herself in an inspired team. The Lassies, with Mitch Skupien at the helm, finished fourth of five teams with a 48-49-1 mark, earning a berth to the playoffs. In the first round, the team disposed of the South Bend Blue Sox (48–44 record) in three games and later faced Fort Wayne in the best-of-five series. During the regular season, Warren posted a 12–9 record with 63 strikeouts and a 3.86 ERA in 26 pitching appearances, ranking seventh in the league in strikeouts while tying teammate Gloria Cordes for the fourth-best in wins. For the first (and last) time of her career, Warren was selected for the All-Star Team. In the playoffs, Cordes hurled and lost the opener to South Bend, but Warren and Elaine Roth won games two and three, respectively.

=== Last Championship Series ===
In Game 1 of the AAGPBL Series, the Kalamazoo Lassies defeated the visiting Fort Wayne Daisies 17–9 behind a four-hit, seven strong innings from June Peppas, who also helped herself by hitting 2-for-4, including one home run. Her teammates Carol Habben and Fern Shollenberger also batted one each, and Chris Ballingall belted a grand slam. Warren relieved Peppas in the eight, forcing Jean Geissinger to hit into a double play, and preserved the victory. Pitching star Maxine Kline, who had posted an 18–7 record with 3.23 ERA for the Daisies during the regular season, gave up 11 runs in six innings and was credited with the loss. Katie Horstman connected two home runs for the Daisies in a lost cause, while her teammate Joanne Weaver slugged one.

In a seven-season career, Warren posted a mark of 114 wins with 93 losses and a 2.41 earned run average. She hit a career-average of .155 (104-for-66) and recorded a collective .939 career fielding percentage. In her final season, did not commit an error all year to lead all pitchers in the league with a perfect 1.000 fielding percentage .In addition, she was one of seven pitchers to collect 100 or more wins in the circuit, ranking 6th on the all-time list behind Helen Nicol (163), Jean Faut (140), Joanne Winter (133), Dorothy Collins (117), Maxine Kline (116), and over Connie Wisniewski (107). As an added value, Warren joined a softball team who won the Michigan state championship in 1956. She also worked during 25 years for the North Central Airlines. After retiring in 1980, she was a long resident of Largo, Florida.

Nancy Warren is part of the AAGPBL permanent display at the Baseball Hall of Fame and Museum in Cooperstown, New York, opened in 1988, which is dedicated to the entire league rather than any individual player. She died in Southfield, Michigan, twelve days short of her 80th birthday.

== Pitching statistics ==
W	L	W-L%	ERA	IP	H	RA	ER	BB	SO	WHIP	SO/BB
114	93	.527	2.41	1428	1134	580	382	422	626	1.089	1.48
