= Jenny Romatowski =

- Catcher/Third base/Outfield
- Born: September 13, 1927; Wyandotte, Michigan, U.S.
- Died: March 12, 2014 (aged 86); Palm Harbor, Florida, U.S.
- Batted: Right Threw: Right

Teams
- South Bend Blue Sox (1946); Rockford Peaches (1947); Chicago Colleens (1948); Racine Belles (1948); Peoria Redwings (1949); South Bend Blue Sox (1950); Kalamazoo Lassies (1951–1954)

Career highlights and awards
- 2× All-Star (1952–1953); AAGPBL champion (1954)

Jenniffer A. "Romey" Romatowski (September 13, 1927 – March 12, 2014) was an American baseball utility player who played from 1946 through 1954 in the All-American Girls Professional Baseball League (AAGPBL). Listed at 5 ft 4 in (1.63 m), 145 lb., she batted and threw right-handed.

== A brief history ==
During World War II, Philip K. Wrigley founded the All-American Girls Professional Baseball League as a promotional sideline to maintain interest in baseball as the military draft was depleting Major League rosters of first-line players. The league made an auspicious debut, averaging about 1,000 fans per game in 1943, while attracting about 210,000 for the entire year. The circuit excelled in attendance and performing during the 1948 season, when 10 teams attracted 910,000 paid fanatics, but by 1954, attendance dropped to only 270,000, when other interests and forms of recreation began to claim the public interest, dooming the league to extinction. It was a neglected chapter of sports history, at least until 1992, when filmmaker Penny Marshall premiered her film A League of Their Own, a fictionalized account of activities in the AAGPBL that brought a rejuvenated interest to the extinct league.

== Early life ==
Born in Wyandotte, Michigan in 1927, Romatowski grew up playing sports with her brothers at a very early age. She participated in golf and tennis, but most of the time she played softball, mostly in the streets or in the prairies, until she became a member of the Wyandotte's top girls' team. In 1946, she graduated at Theodore Roosevelt High School in Wyandotte and immediately joined the All-American Girls Professional Baseball League.

== AAGPBL career ==
Romatowski moved around for a while, as the AAGPBL shifted players as needed to help new teams stay afloat. She entered the league in 1946 with the South Bend Blue Sox, playing for them one year before joining the Rockford Peaches (1947). She then found herself on the move again, this time to the Chicago Colleens (1948), Racine Belles (1948), Peoria Redwings (1949) and South Bend Blue Sox (1950), before settling down with the Kalamazoo Lassies for the rest of her career (1951–1954). She was used sparingly at third base and outfield before converting to catcher.

A competent backstop, known more for her defensive skills rather than for her offensive output, Romatowski possessed a strong arm with an extremely quick release of the throw, being appropriately dubbed Rifle Arm.

In 1952, Romatowski was selected for the All-Star Team as a replacement for Ruth Richard (C) and Fern Shollenberger (3B). The All-Stars, with Bill Allington at the helm, faced the host South Bend Blue Sox, who were managed by Karl Winsch.

For the second consecutive year Romatowski joined the All-Star squad in 1953. Her most productive season came in 1954, when she posted career-highs with a .258 average and six home runs, led all outfielders with 24 assists and formed part of the Lassies team that won the championship, during what turned out to be the league's final season.

== Life after baseball ==
Following her baseball career, Romatowski graduated from Eastern Michigan University with a degree in physical education, and then she taught physical education for nearly 30 years in the Van Dyke-Warren school system until her retirement in 1983.

== Honors and awards ==
Since 1988 Romatowski is part of Women in Baseball, a permanent display based at the Baseball Hall of Fame and Museum in Cooperstown, New York, which was unveiled to honor the entire All-American Girls Professional Baseball League rather than individual baseball personalities.

In 1999 she was selected for membership in the National Polish-American Sports Hall of Fame, becoming only the fifth female to be enshrined in the hall. Then, in 2000 she was inducted into the Eastern Michigan University Hall of Fame for her career achievements.

Besides, she is one of only two women to have been inducted into the Wyandotte Sports Hall of Fame, and was also honored with membership of the Michigan Amateur Sports Hall of Fame.

Romatowski was a longtime resident of Palm Harbor, Florida, where she died in 2014 at the age of 86.

== AAGPBL statistics ==
Batting

GP	AB	R	H	2B	3B	HR	RBI	SB	TB	BB	SO	BA	OBP	SLG
535	1639	115	334	21	3	6	128	31	379	97	114	.204	.248	.231

Fielding

GP	PO	A	E	TC	DP	FA
503	1656	439	87	2182	48	.960
