= Conneaut High School =

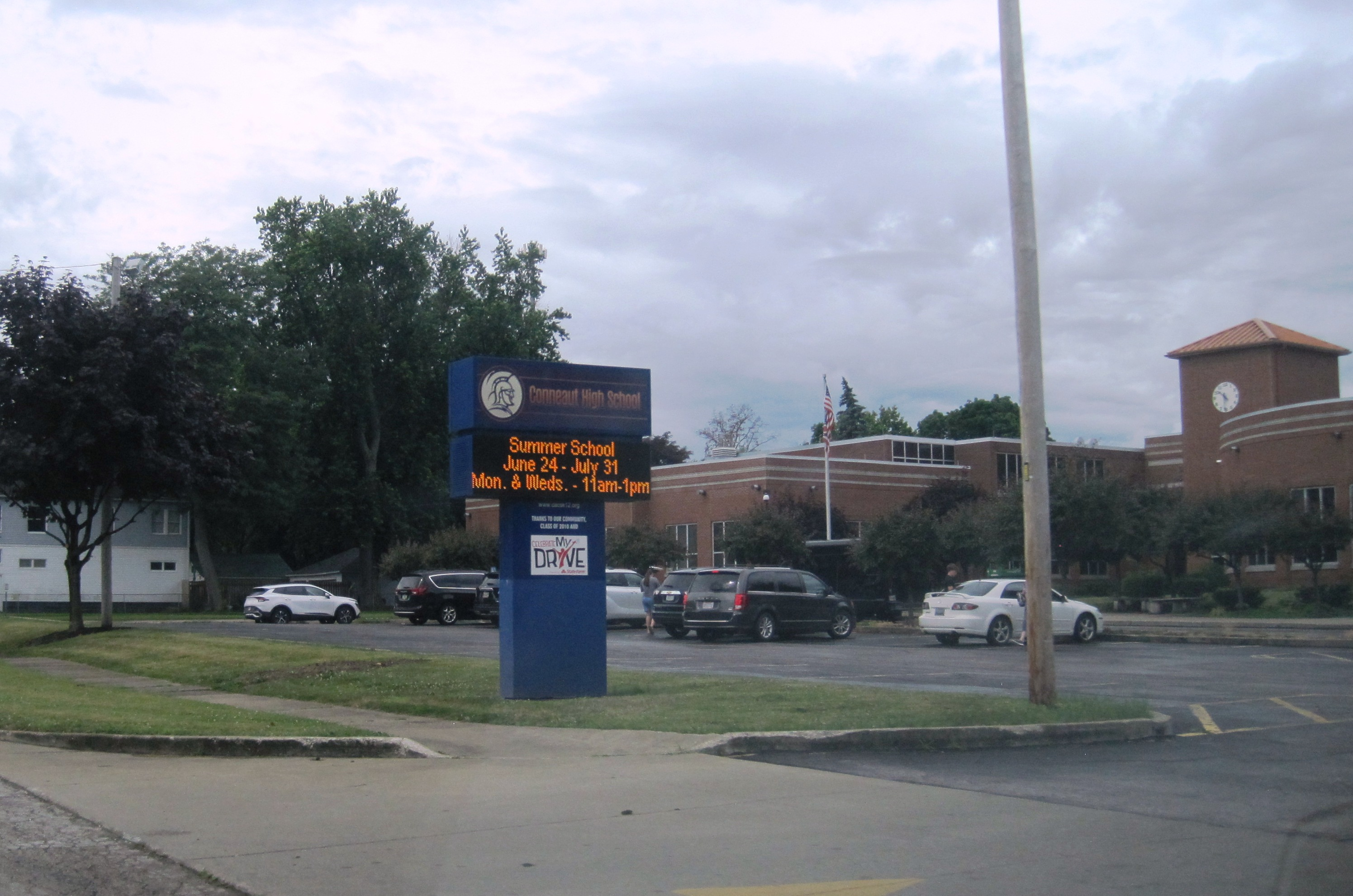
- Front of school along Mill Street

Location
- 381 Mill Street; Conneaut, (Ashtabula County), Ohio 44030; United States
- Coordinates: 41°56′50″N 80°33′39″W

Information
- Type: Public, Coeducational
- School district: Conneaut Area City School District
- Superintendent: Lori Riley
- Principal: Stephanie Anservitz
- Teaching staff: 26.50 (FTE)
- Grades: 9-12
- Student to teacher ratio: 14.94
- Colors: Navy and Gold
- Athletics conference: Chagrin Valley Conference
- Team name: Spartans
- Website: https://www.cacsk12.org/

Conneaut High School is a public high school in Conneaut, Ohio. It is the only high school in the Conneaut Area City School District.. Athletic Teams are known as the Spartans and compete as a member of the Ohio High School Athletic Association in the Chagrin Valley Conference.

== Athletics ==
=== State championships ===
- Softball - 2000

== Notable alumni ==
- Jean Lovell - former professional baseball player in the All-American Girls Professional Baseball League
- Mike Palagyi - former professional baseball player in the Major League Baseball (MLB)
