= 2022 Champaign County, Illinois Executive election =

- November 8, 2022

Nominee	Steve Summers	Ted Myhre
Party	Democratic	Republican
Popular vote	37,894	28,532
Percentage	57.05%	42.95%
- Township results Summers: 50–60% 60–70% 70–80% 80–90% Myhre: 60–70% 70–80% 80–90%
County Executive before election
Darlene Kloeppel
Democratic
Elected County Executive
Steve Summers
Democratic

The 2022 Champaign County, Illinois Executive election was held on November 8, 2022. Incumbent Democratic County Executive Darlene Kloeppel declined to seek re-election to a second term. Steve Summers, the Vice Chair of the County Board, won the Democratic nomination unopposed and faced Sadorus Village President Ted Myhre, the Republican nominee, in the general election. Summers defeated Myhre in a landslide, winning 57 percent of the vote to Myhre's 43 percent.

== Democratic primary ==
=== Candidates ===
- Steve Summers, County Board Vice Chairman

=== Primary results ===
Democratic primary results
Party	Candidate	Votes	%
Democratic	Steve Summers	12,793	100.00%
Total votes		12,793	100.00%

== Republican nomination ==
No candidates filed for the Republican nomination. Sadorus Village President Ted Myhre was named as the Republican nominee to fill the vacancy on the ballot.

== General election ==
=== Results ===
2022 Champaign County Executive election
Party	Candidate	Votes	%
Democratic	Steve Summers	37,894	57.05%
Republican	Ted Myhre	28,532	42.95%
Total votes		66,426	100.00%
Democratic hold			
