= Nancy Mudge =

American baseball player (1929 – 2012)

- Second base
- Born: October 3, 1929; Bridgeport, New York, U.S.
- Died: July 24, 2012 (aged 82); Elk River, Minnesota, U.S.
- Batted: Right Threw: Right

Teams
- Chicago Colleens (1950); Springfield Sallies (1950); Kalamazoo Lassies (1951–1952); Battle Creek Belles (1952); Muskegon Belles (1953); Kalamazoo Lassies (1954)

Career highlights and awards
- AAGPBL Championship Title (1954); AAGPBL All-Star Team (1954)

Nancy Elizabeth Mudge [Cato] (October 3, 1929 – July 24, 2012) was an infielder who played from 1950 through 1954 in the All-American Girls Professional Baseball League (AAGPBL). Listed at 5 ft 2 in (1.57 m), 120 lb., she batted and threw right-handed.

Born in Bridgeport, New York, Nancy Mudge was one of 25 players who made the All-American Girls Professional Baseball League clubs, hailed from New York City and State, including Muriel Bevis, Gloria Cordes, Mildred Deegan, Marie Kruckel, Betty Trezza and Margaret Wigiser.

Mudge played during five seasons in the AAGPBL, three of them with the Kalamazoo Lassies. She was a solid, smooth-fielding second baseman who paced the league in fielding percentage between 1953 and 1954. A light hitter, she had the ability to get on base, by any means, beyond the pure ability to get the hit. She reached first base by walks, by a bunt single or being hit by the pitcher, though she was a .183 career hitter but posted a solid .311 on-base percentage. A smart and aggressive baserunner, she knew when to take the extra base. An AAGPBL scout tried to sign Mudge after seeing her playing field hockey in Indiana, thinking that she had athletic abilities, endurance and fitness necessary to play baseball. Mudge refused, because she wanted to graduate college first. However, she later had a tryout with the Fort Wayne Daisies.

== AAGPBL career ==
In 1950, between her junior and senior years in college, Mudge was given a contract to play with the Chicago Colleens, then was sent to the Springfield Sallies during the midseason. She hit a combined .308 average with 24 runs batted in in their first 40 games. However, she tore a cartilage in her knee that required surgery and rehabilitation for the rest of the summer.

After graduating from college, Mudge returned to baseball action and was assigned to the Kalamazoo Lassies in 1951. She played for them two and a half years before joining the Battle Creek Belles during the 1952 midseason. After that, she spent 1953 with the relocated Muskegon Belles, when the franchise moved for a while to see if that city would support a girls baseball team, but the experiment failed and Mudge returned to Kalamazoo in 1954.

In 1954 Mudge hit .232 in 98 games, including career-numbers in runs scored (74) and hits (82), while driving in 22 runs. She also made the league's All-Star Team, forming part of a Lassies All-Star slick infield that included June Peppas at first base, Dorothy Schroeder at shortstop, and Fern Shollenberger at third base. Meanwhile, the called Home Run Twins, Chris Ballingall (17) and Carol Habben (15), powered the offense with 32 home runs; Peppas and Schroeder enjoyed big numbers, and Kalamazoo advanced to the Championship Series. As a result, the Lassies defeated the Daisies in a best-of-five games series, during what turned out to be the AAGPBL final season.

″Smudgie″, as her teammates called her, returned home after the league disbanded. She married and changed her name to Nancy Mudge Cato. She later moved to Elk River, Minnesota, where she live for the rest of her life.

Since 1980, her former teammate June Peppas and a group of friends began assembling a list of names and addresses of former All-American Girls Professional Baseball League players. Her work turned into a newsletter and resulted in the league’s first-ever reunion in Chicago, Illinois, in 1982. Starting from that reunion, a Players Association was formed five years later and a significant number of former AAGPBL players continued to enjoy reunions, which became annual events in 1998. For many years, Mudge was an active participant in the events organized by the association.

The AAGPBL folded in 1954, but there is now a permanent display at the Baseball Hall of Fame and Museum at Cooperstown, New York, since November 5, 1988, that honors those who were part of this unique experience. Mudge and Peppas, along with the rest of the league's girls, are now enshrined in the Hall.

The AAGPBL Players Association helped to bring the league story to the public eye. The association was largely responsible for the opening of the aforementioned exhibition. Of the approximately 560 women who had played in the league, most had lost touch with the others; at least not until the first reunion held in Chicago.

In July 1988, the Society for American Baseball Research (SABR) held their annual National Convention in Minneapolis with 340 people in attendance. Andy MacPhail was the keynote speaker, and Minor league baseball home run legend Joe Hauser was a special guest, while Nancy was part of a players panel along Hauser, Julio Bécquer and Howie Schultz.

In 1992, Mudge, along with Jean Havlish and Kay Heim, two other Minnesota residents and former AAGPBL players, were invited to throw out the first pitch in a game Angels–Twins played at the Metrodome. The trio also was honored by the Colorado Silver Bullets all-female baseball team in their 1994 inaugural season, in which they threw out the first ball pitch of a game celebrated in Saint Paul.

Nancy Mudge Cato died in 2012 at her home in Elk River, Minnesota, at the age of 82.

== Career statistics ==
Batting

GP	AB	R	H	2B	3B	HR	RBI	SB	TB	BB	SO	BA	OBP	SLG
350	1094	186	200	25	3	8	55	97	255	BB	SO	.183	.311	.233

Fielding

GP	PO	A	E	TC	DP	FA
326	826	623	109	1558	111	.935
