= Eilaine Roth =

American baseball player (1929–2011)

- Outfield
- Born: January 17, 1929; Michigan City, Indiana, U.S.
- Died: November 1, 2011 (aged 82); Springfield, Michigan, U.S.
- Batted: Right Threw: Right

Teams
- Peoria Redwings (1948–1949); Kalamazoo Lassies (1950–1951)

Eilaine Roth [″I″] (January 17, 1929 – November 1, 2011) was an outfielder who played from 1948 through 1951 in the All-American Girls Professional Baseball League (AAGPBL). Listed at 5' 2", 123 lb., she batted and threw right-handed.

Born in Michigan City, Indiana, Eilaine Roth was the daughter of Herman and Elsie (née Kumnatzke) Roth. Younger than twin sister Elaine by fifteen minutes, Roth spent four years in the league mainly as a right fielder and pinch-hitter, while her sister was a pitcher for seven years. The twins attended Elston High School, graduating in 1946.

The Roth twins joined the All-American Girls Professional Baseball League in 1948 with the Peoria Redwings. They played together for two years as the "dynamic duo" (″E″ and ″I″), because it worked well for promotion, but when the team folded before the 1951 season, Eilaine was relocated to the Kalamazoo Lassies and Elaine joined the South Bend Blue Sox. In 1953, the sisters came together again in Kalamazoo.

Her most productive season came in 1950, when she posted career numbers in games played (107), hits (78) and stolen bases (64), while hitting a .202 average. Used sparingly in 1954, she hit .251 (52-for-207) in 79 games.

After leaving the league, Roth played slow-pitch softball in a factory league from 1954 to 1957. She later worked 21 years as an inspector for Upjohn Pharmaceutical Company in Kalamazoo, Michigan.

Eilaine Roth died in Springfield, Michigan, aged 82, following complications from cancer.

== Career statistics ==
Batting

GP	AB	R	H	2B	3B	HR	RBI	SB	TB	BB	SO	BA	OBP	SLG
293	932	116	186	12	7	0	52	100	212	121	57	.200	.292	.227

Collective fielding

GP	PO	A	E	TC	DP	FA
267	356	23	26	405	5	.936
