= June Peppas =

American baseball player (1929–2016)

- First base / Pitcher
- Born: June 16, 1929; Kansas City, Missouri, U.S.
- Died: March 14, 2016 (aged 86); Stuart, Florida, U.S.
- Batted: Left Threw: Left

Career statistics
- Batting average: .273
- Home runs: 21
- Runs batted in: 257
- Stats at Baseball Reference

Teams
- Fort Wayne Daisies (1948–1949); Racine Belles (1949–1950); Battle Creek Belles (1951); Kalamazoo Lassies (1951–1954)

Career highlights and awards
- Two-time All-Star Team (1953–1954); AAGPBL Championship Title (1954)

June Peppas (June 16, 1929 – March 14, 2016) was a first basewoman and pitcher who played from 1948 through 1954 in the All-American Girls Professional Baseball League (AAGPBL). Listed at 5 ft 5 in (1.65 m), 145 lb (66 kg), she batted and threw left-handed.

== Early life ==
Peppas was born in Kansas City, Missouri, and grew up in Fort Wayne, Indiana. As a student she was always involved in athletics, predominantly underhand fast pitch softball. She graduated from Elmhurst High School in 1947, and from 1942 to 1947 played for a championship team sponsored by Harold Greiner, owner of the Bob-Inn Restaurant in Fort Wayne. The team won state titles in 1944 and 1945, while Greiner, who scouted for the All-American Professional Baseball League, recommended Peppas for the league's tryouts. She received contract offers from a professional softball league and the AAGPBL, but decided to join the All-Americans. She had a mother who had a bad cold all the time and had to use the money she earned to take care of her and a young brother George Demetrious Peppas Jr.

== AAGPBL career ==
In 1948, Peppas attended to spring training at Opa-locka, Florida, and was assigned to the Fort Wayne Daisies, playing for them one and a half year before joining the Racine Belles (1949–50), Battle Creek Belles (1951) and Kalamazoo Lassies (1951–54). She spent most of her time at first base and pitching, eventually appearing at outfield.

According to the new league's regulations, Peppas had to make the transition from underhand to overhand pitching. Her unfamiliarity with the style and the ball size caused her negative results.

In her rookie season, Peppas posted a 4–12 record with 39 strikeouts and 91 walks in 113 innings for the Daisies, including a 4.62 ERA which ranked her near last place between the league pitchers. Nevertheless, she still had a respectable .264 batting average. In 1949, she played more games at first base and overcame her pitching control problems, going 3–4 with a 2.25 ERA while hitting .150 in 50 games, though she was bothered by two knee injuries.

In 1950, once Peppas overcame her injuries, her career blossomed. She hit .268 with a career-high 52 runs batted in, including 11 doubles, five triples, and four home runs. As a pitcher, she had a decent 4–4 record with a 4.57 ERA. But her control problems returned, as she walked more hitters than she struck out in 1950 (41-to-20) and 1951 (31-to-20). Her most productive seasons came with the Lassies, when she was selected at first base for the All-Star Team in 1953 and 1954, even though she often pitched.

From 1952 to 1953, Peppas improved her batting averages from .262 to .271. In 1954 she drove in 54 runs and posted career-numbers with a .333 average, 16 home runs, and her only pitching winning season with a 6–4 record and a 3.32 ERA in 13 appearances. Her .333 average was a team's best and the league's fifth highest mark for players who played at least 80 games. When Kalamazoo had to face the Fort Wayne Daisies for the AAGPBL Championship Title, Peppas came through with a stellar performance.

=== 1954 championship ===
In Game 1 of the AAGPBL Series, the Lassies defeated the Daisies 17–9 behind a four-hit, seven strong innings from Peppas, who also helped herself by hitting 2-for-4, including one home run. Her teammates Carol Habben, Fern Shollenberger and Chris Ballingall, who hit a grand slam, also slugged one each. Katie Horstman connected on two home runs for the Daisies in a lost cause, and her teammate Joanne Weaver slugged one. Maxine Kline, who had posted an 18–7 record with 3.23 ERA during the regular season, gave up 11 runs in six innings and was credited with the loss.

The Daisies evened the Series against the Lassies winning Game 2, 11–4, after hitting five home runs off two pitchers. Horstman started the feat with a two-run home run to open the score in the first inning. In the rest of the game, Betty Weaver Foss added two homers with five RBI, while her sister Joanne and Geissinger added solo shots. Nancy Mudge and Dorothy Schroeder homered for Kalamazoo, while Peppas, who played first base, hit a solo homer in three at-bats.

In Game 3, the Daisies defeated the Lassies, 8–7, fueled again by a heavy hitting by Joanne Weaver, who hit a double, a triple and a three-run home run in five at bats, driving in four runs. Peppas went 1-for-4 to spark a seventh inning three-run rally, but Fort Wayne came back in the bottom of the inning with two runs that marked the difference.

In another close score, the Lassies evened the Series in Game 4 with a victory over the Daisies, 6–5, behind a strong pitching effort by Gloria Cordes, who hurled a complete game. Peppas contributed with a single, a double and one RBI in four at-bats.

In decisive Game 5, Peppas pitched a clutch complete game and went 3-for-5 with an RBI against her former Daisies team, winning by an 8–5 margin to give the Lassies the Championship title in the AAGPBL's last ever game. She received support from Mary Taylor (5-for-5), Balingall (3-for-4) and Schroeder, who drove in the winning run in the bottom of the eight. Peppas finished with a .450 average and collected two of the three Lassies victories, to become the winning pitcher of the last game in the league's history.

== Personal life ==
Following her AAGPBL career, Peppas earned bachelor's and master's degrees in arts from the Western Michigan University during the late 1960s. She later taught vocational-education graphic arts and operated her own printing business, retiring in 1988.

Since 1980, Peppas and a group of friends began assembling a list of names and addresses of former AAGPBL players. Her work turned into a newsletter that resulted in the league's first-ever reunion in Chicago, Illinois, in 1982. Starting from that reunion, a Players Association was formed five years later and many former AAGPBL players and descendants continue to enjoy reunions, which became annual events in 1998.

June Peppas died on March 14, 2016, in Stuart, Florida. Her life partner of 46 years, Polly Huitt, preceded her in death in 2007.

== Sources ==
- All-American Girls Professional Baseball League Record Book – W. C. Madden. Publisher: McFarland & Company, 2000. Format: Paperback, 294pp. Language: English. ISBN 0-7864-3747-2
- Encyclopedia of women and baseball' – Leslie A. Heaphy, Mel Anthony May. Publisher: McFarland & Company, 2006. Format: Paperback, 438pp. Language: English. ISBN 0786421002
- The Guide to U.S. Popular Culture – Ray B. Browne, Pat Browne. Publisher: Popular Press 3, 2001. Format: Hardcover, 1010pp. Language: English. ISBN 0-87972-821-3
- The Women of the All-American Girls Professional Baseball League: A Biographical Dictionary - W. C. Madden. Publisher: McFarland & Company, 2005. Format: Paperback, 295 pp. Language: English. ISBN 0-7864-3747-2

== Online references ==
- All-American Girls Professional Baseball League – June Peppas
- June Peppas at the SABR Baseball Biography Project, by Jim Sargent. Retrieved October 8, 2013.
- The Diamond Angle Interview – Lou Parrotta
- June Peppas competed in league of her own by Gary Kirchherr, Allegan County News & Gazette, May 28, 1987, pp. 9-10
- Obituary
