= Conneaut Area City School District =

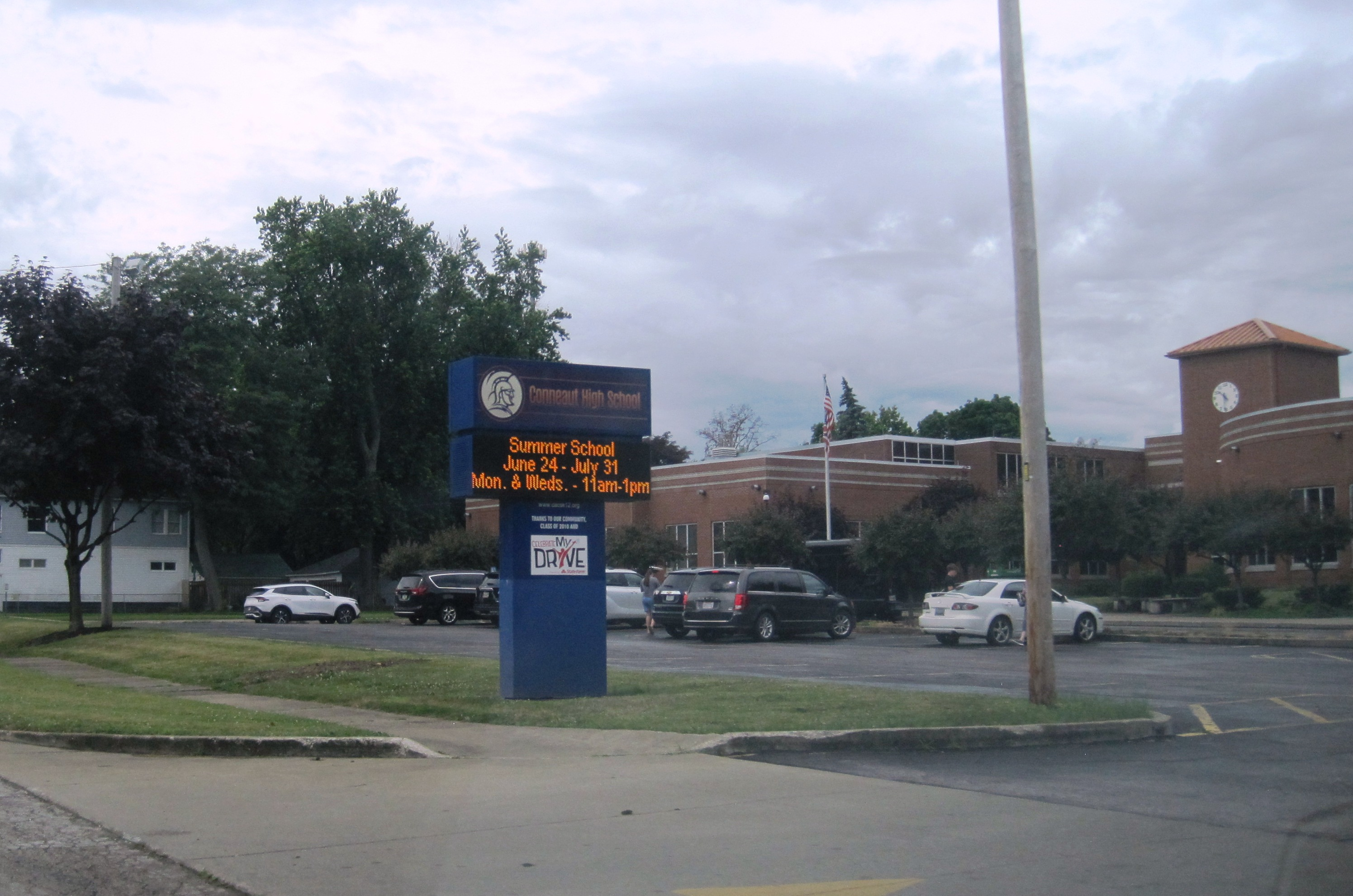
- Front of high school along Mill Street

Location
- 230 Gateway Ave Ste B Conneaut, (Ashtabula County), Ohio 44030; United States

Information
- Type: Public, Coeducational
- Established: 1962
- NCES District ID: 3904381
- Superintendent: Lori Riley
- Teaching staff: 99.40 (FTE)
- Grades: PK-12
- Enrollment: 1,587 (2024–25)
- Student to teacher ratio: 15.97
- Colors: Navy and Gold
- Team name: Spartans
- Website: https://www.cacsk12.org/

The Conneaut Area City School District is a school district located in Conneaut, Ohio, United States. The school district serves one high school, one middle school and two elementary schools.

== History ==
The Conneaut Area School District formed in 1962, when existing school districts consolidated into Conneaut, including a previous Conneaut School District and Rowe School District.

In the mid-2000s, several elementary schools were closed and demolished within the district. Since the closures, Conneaut only uses Gateway and Lakeshore Elementary Schools.

== Schools ==
Schools within the district consist of:

=== High School ===
- Conneaut High School

=== Middle School ===
- Conneaut Middle School

=== Elementary Schools ===
- Gateway Elementary School
- Lakeshore Primary Elementary School

=== Former Schools ===
- Chestnut School
- Dean Ave School
- Lake View School
- West Main Street School
- Southeast Elementary School
