= Kalamazoo Lassies =

- 1950–1954; Kalamazoo, Michigan
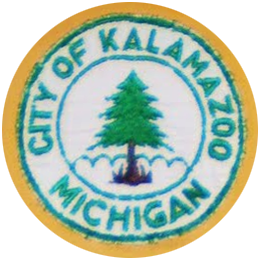
Team logo
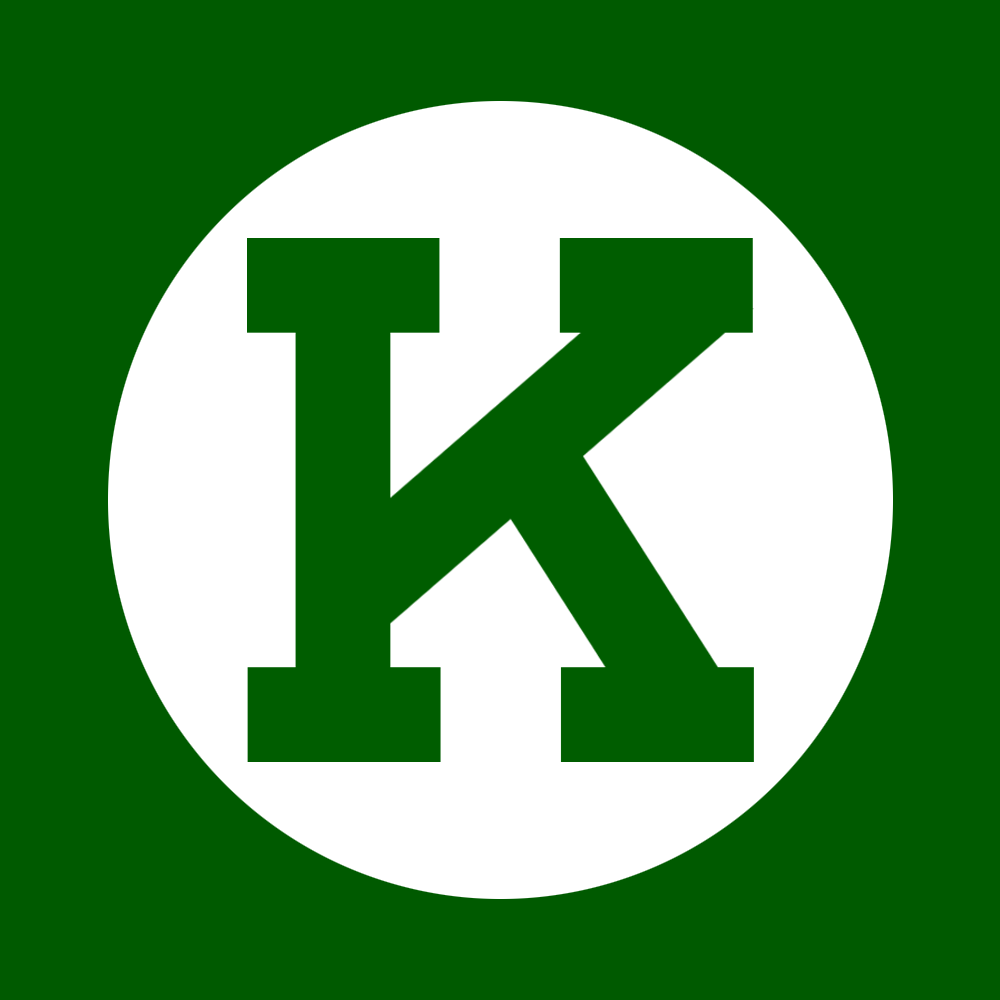
Cap insignia

Minor league affiliations
- Previous leagues: All-American Girls Professional Baseball League

Minor league titles
- League titles: 1954

Team data
- Colors: Green, gold, white
- Previous parks: Lindstrom Field; Catholic Athletic Association Field
- Owner/ Operator: AAGPBL

The Kalamazoo Lassies were a team who played from 1950 through 1954 in the All-American Girls Professional Baseball League (AAGPBL). The team represented Kalamazoo, Michigan. Home games were initially played at Lindstrom Field, but later games were played at the Catholic Athletic Association Field, now the Soisson-Rapacz field. Kalamazoo uniforms were white (home) and gold (away) with dark green numbers, belt, socks, and cap.

== History ==
In 1950 the AAGPBL was losing money and fans, and the teams and host cities were changing almost every year. This was a good thing for Kalamazoo as the city was granted the Muskegon Lassies team on a trial basis when the city of Muskegon could no longer support them. The move took place in the middle of the season and the new Kalamazoo Lassies played their first game, still in their Muskegon uniforms, on June 15, 1950, at Lindstrom Field. About 1,400 fans attended the game, which was won by the defending league champion Rockford Peaches, 8–2. The new Lassies posted their first victory the next night, a 10–2 rout of Rockford led by pitcher Doris Sams and player-manager Bonnie Baker. The Lassies combined for a 36–73 record that year and finished in the cellar.

The Lassies ended 1951 with a mark of 33 wins, 75 losses and two ties, but moved up one spot in the final standings. In 1952, the team finished fifth of six teams with a 49–60 record, their best yet. Kalamazoo improved in 1953, ending third at 59-50-2 and reaching the playoffs for the first time. After dropping the opener to the first-place Fort Wayne Daisies, Kalamazoo won 2–1 and 5–3 as Jean Lovell got a couple big hits. But the Lassies lost both games in the finals to the Grand Rapids Chicks.

In the 1954 season, the Lassies posted a 48-49-1 record and finished fourth of five teams, earning the right to go to the playoffs. In the first round, the team disposed of the South Bend Blue Sox in three games and faced the Fort Wayne Daisies for the Championship Title.

== 1954 champions ==
1954 Kalamazoo Lassies Champion Team Back, L-R: Barbara Liebrich (chaperone), Nancy Warren (P), Carol Habben (OF/C), Mary Taylor (OF), Dorothy Schroeder (SS), Kay Blumetta (P/1B), Gloria Cordes (P), Chris Ballingall (C), Jean Marlowe (P/OF), Jane Stoll (OF), Mitch Skupien (manager). Middle, L-R: Jenny Romatowski (C/3B), June Peppas (P/1B), Elaine Roth (P/OF), Nancy Mudge (2B), Fern Shollenberger (3B), Jean Lovell (C/P). Front: Judy [?] (bat girl).

In Game 1 of the AAGPBL Series, Kalamazoo defeated Fort Wayne 17-9 behind a four-hit, seven strong innings from June Peppas, who also helped herself by hitting 2-for-4, including one home run. Her teammates Carol Habben and Fern Shollenberger also slugged one each, and Chris Ballingall belted a grand slam. Pitching star Maxine Kline, who had posted an 18–7 record with 3.23 ERA for the Daisies during the regular season, gave up 11 runs in six innings and was credited with the loss. Katie Horstman connected two home runs for the Daisies in a lost cause, and her teammate Joanne Weaver slugged one.

The Daisies bounced back in Game 2, hitting five home runs against the Lassies to win, 11–4. Horstman started the feat with a two-run home run to open the score in the first inning. In the rest of the game, Betty Weaver Foss added two homers and drove in five runs, while her sister Joanne and In Game 4, starter Gloria Cordes helped Kalamazoo to tie the series, pitching a complete game victory over the Daisies, 6–5. Habben drove in two runs who marked the difference, while Kline suffered her second loss of the Series.

In decisive Game 5, Peppas pitched a clutch complete game and went 3-for-5 with an RBI against her former Daisies team, winning by an 8–5 margin to give the Lassies the Championship title in the AAGPBL's last game. She received support from Mary Taylor (5-for-5), Balingall (3-for-4) and Schroeder, who drove in the winning run in the bottom of the eight. Peppas finished with a .450 average in the Series and collected two of the three Lassies victories, to become the winning pitcher of the last game in the league's history.

== All-time roster ==
Bold denotes members of the inaugural roster

- Gertrude Alderfer
- Agnes Allen
- Isabel Alvarez
- Ange Armato
- **Mary Baker**
- Chris Ballingall
- Doris Barr
- **Mary Baumgartner**
- Donna Becker
- Kay Blumetta
- Mary Carey
- **Isora Castillo**
- Donna Chartier
- Donna Cook
- Doris Cook
- **Gloria Cordes**
- Betty Jane Cornett
- **Alice DeCambra**
- **Lillian Faralla**
- Betty Francis
- Carol Habben
- Marlene Hammond
- Jean Havlish
- **Alice Hohlmayer**
- **Frances Janssen**
- Rita Keller
- Barbara Liebrich
- Jean Lovell
- **Betty Luna**
- Jean Marlowe
- Mirtha Marrero
- **Naomi Meier**
- Miss DeMarco
- Jane Moffet
- Eleanor Moore
- Nancy Mudge
- Dorothy Naum
- Miss Nogay
- Anna Mae O'Dowd
- **Barbara Payne**
- Marguerite Pearson
- June Peppas
- Betty Jean Peterson
- **Charlene Pryer**
- **Sara Reeser**
- Jenny Romatowski
- **Eilaine Roth**
- Elaine Roth
- Terry Rukavina
- Doris Sams
- Joan Schatz
- Dorothy Schroeder
- Fern Shollenberger
- Joan Sindelar
- Joyce Steele
- Jane Stoll
- Mary Taylor
- **Helen Walulik**
- Nancy Warren
- **Margaret Wenzell**
- **Betty Whiting**
- **Ruth Williams**

== Managers ==
* Mary Baker	1950
* Norm Derringer	1951
* Mitch Skupien	1952; 1953; 1954

== Sources ==
- All-American Girls Professional Baseball League history
- All-American Girls Professional Baseball League official website – Kalamazoo Lassies seasons
- All-American Girls Professional Baseball League official website – Manager/Player profile search results
- Kalamazoo Public Library
- June Peppas: All-American Star
- All-American Girls Professional Baseball League Record Book – W. C. Madden. Publisher: McFarland & Company, 2000. Format: Hardcover, 294pp. Language: English. ISBN 0-7864-0597-X
- The Women of the All-American Girls Professional Baseball League: A Biographical Dictionary – W. C. Madden. Publisher: McFarland & Company, 2005. Format: Softcover, 295 pp. Language: English. ISBN 978-0-7864-2263-0
