= Marlene Hammond =

American baseball player

- Born: Kalamazoo, Michigan, U.S.

Teams
- Kalamazoo Lassies (1954)

Career highlights and awards
- Women in Baseball – AAGPBL Permanent Display at the Baseball Hall of Fame and Museum (unveiled in 1988)

Marlene Hammond was an All-American Girls Professional Baseball League player.

Born in Kalamazoo, Michigan, Hammond played for her home team Kalamazoo Lassies in 1954, during what turned out to be the All American League's final season. Additional information about her is incomplete because there are no records available at the time of the request.

In 1988, Marlene Hammond received further recognition when she became part of Women in Baseball, a permanent display based at the Baseball Hall of Fame and Museum in Cooperstown, New York which was unveiled to honor the entire All-American Girls Professional Baseball League.
