= Mary L. Doe =

American suffragist and temperance reformer (1836–1913)

Mary Lydia Doe
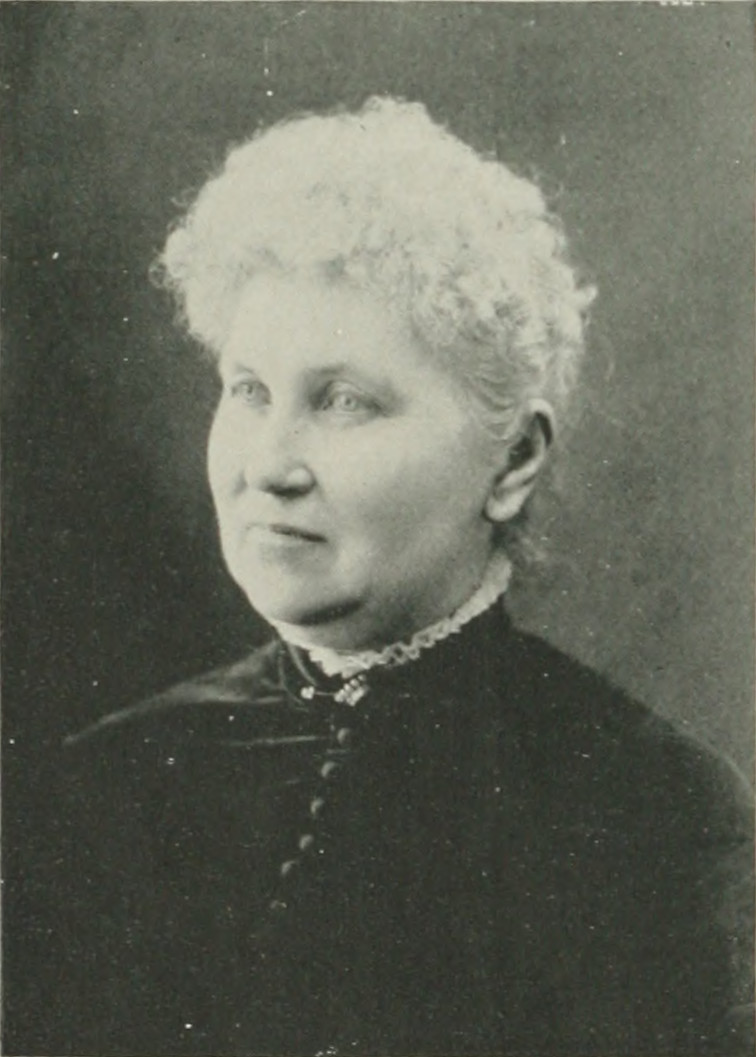
- Born: Mary Lydia Thompson; July 27, 1836; Conneaut, Ohio, U.S.
- Died: March 9, 1913 (aged 76); Detroit, Michigan, U.S.
- Organizations: Washingtonians; Good Templars; Woman's Christian Temperance Union
- Known for: Suffragist, temperance activist, author

Mary Lydia Doe (née Mary Lydia Thompson; 27 July 1836 – 9 March 1913) was a 19th-century American suffragist, temperance reformer, teacher, and author from the U.S. state of Ohio. She served as the first president of the Michigan State Equal Suffrage Association, as well as parliamentarian of the International Label League. She was also the author of a book on parliamentary law. While still a child, she signed the temperance movement pledge under one of the original Washingtonians, later joining the Good Templars and the Woman's Christian Temperance Union.

== Early years and education ==
Mary Lydia Thompson was born in Conneaut, Ohio on July 27, 1836, the daughter of Rev. Volney and Lovinia (Singer) Thompson. Her immediate ancestors, the Thompsons and Harpers, emigrated from Vermont and settled in that portion of Ohio known as the Western Reserve. At nine years of age, she was sent to the Conneaut Academy, then just completed. At 15, she began to teach a country school US$1.00 a week and "boarded around." Later, she attended the State Normal School (now known as Edinboro University of Pennsylvania) in Edinboro, Pennsylvania. She signed the temperance pledge under one of the original Washingtonians when only eight years old.

== Career ==
In 1853, Doe joined the Good Templars. In 1878, she became a member of the Michigan Grand Lodge of Good Templars, and held the office of grand vice-templar and of grand assistant secretary for several years. She further showed her interest in temperance by joining the Woman's Christian Temperance Union and the various other temperance organizations in the towns where she lived.

From the time of the defeat of the suffrage amendment to the Michigan State constitution in 1874, there was no central organization in Michigan for ten years, although a few local societies maintained an existence. In 1877, Doe went to Saginaw, Michigan, where she at once made friends with the advocates of equal suffrage. Through a conjunction of these forces, a convention was called at Flint on May 21, 1884, which resulted in the forming of a State Equal Suffrage Association, with Doe as president, and Governor Josiah Begole as vice-president. She held that office for six years, was active in securing many of the privileges granted to women by the Michigan Legislature, and spent much of her time with other equal suffragists in the State capital.

Doe was elected parliamentarian of the International Label League. She was the author of a book on parliamentary law, as well as conducting departments for various newspapers on subjects such as temperance, labor, and woman suffrage. She changed her residence from Saginaw to Bay City in 1886, and opened a store for fancy goods. While a member of Methodist Episcopal Church, she taught Bible classes. She died in Detroit on March 9, 1913, of a cerebral hemorrhage.
