= National Museum of Ship Models and Sea History =

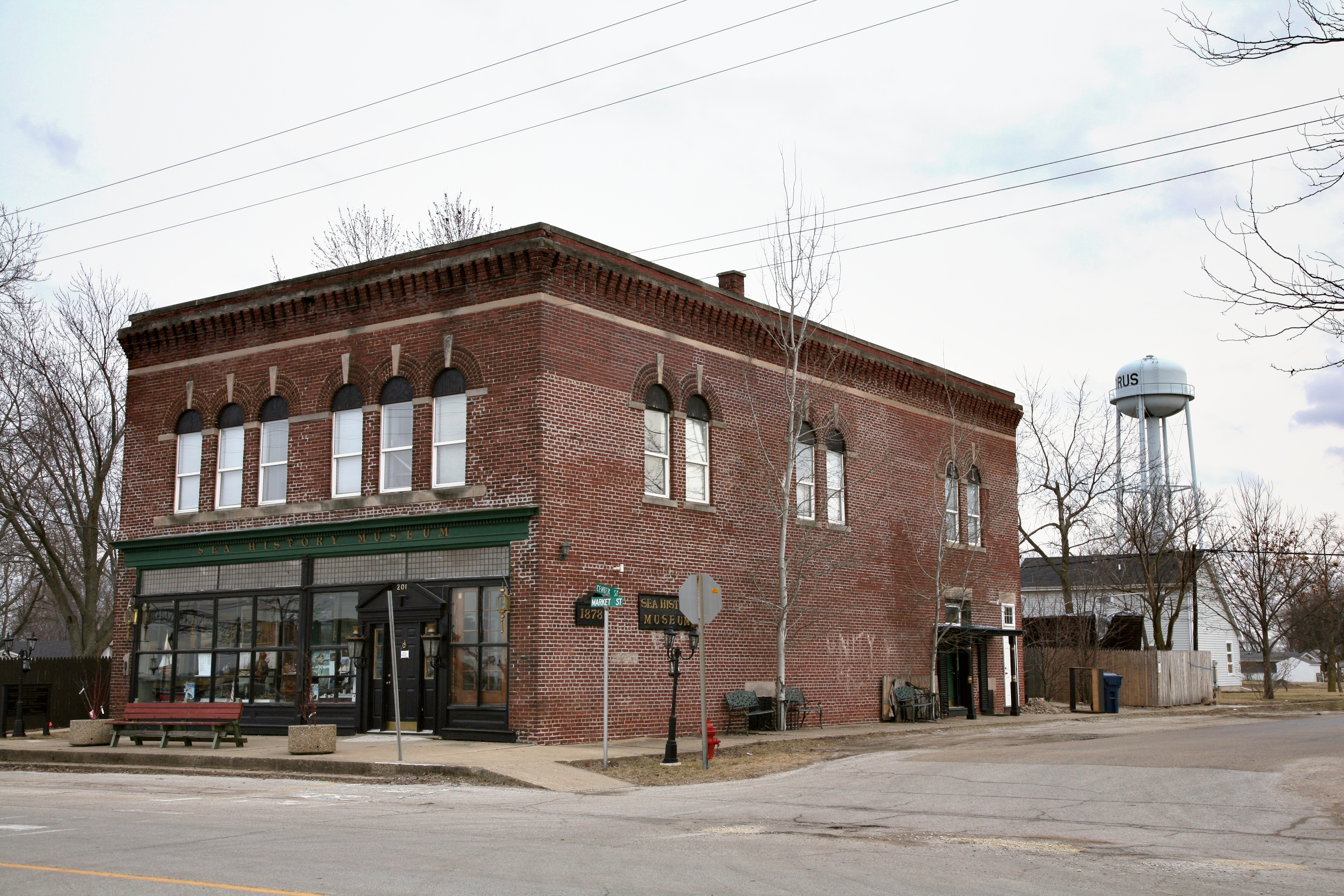
- Established: 2001
- Location: 201 S. Market St. Sadorus, Illinois
- Coordinates: 39.966872°N 88.344187°W
- Type: Maritime museum
- Director: Charles Lozar
- Website: National Museum of Ship Models and Sea History

The National Museum of Ship Models and Sea History is a private non-profit museum, located in Sadorus, Illinois. It features ship models from around the world and throughout history.

Recent exhibits include a 27-foot model of the RMS Queen Mary made entirely out of one million toothpicks. The collection includes ship models from the movies Tora! Tora! Tora!, Cleopatra, and Ben-Hur as well as from the television series Tugboat Annie Sails Again.

The museum is open on Saturdays (11 a.m. - 4:30 p.m.) Saturdays from April 1 to November 30; also by appointment, including through the winter holidays.

== In the press ==
The museum was featured in a January 2004 Chicago Tribune cover story.
