= Mason A. Thayer =

American politician

Mason A. Thayer was a member of the Wisconsin State Assembly.

== Biography ==
Thayer was born on November 17, 1839, in Conneaut, Ohio. He later moved to Sparta, Wisconsin.

== Career ==
Thayer was a member of the Assembly in 1882. Additionally, he was Register of Deeds of Sparta and Chairman of the Monroe County, Wisconsin Board of Supervisors. He was a Republican.
