= Elaine Roth =

- Pitcher
- Born: January 17, 1929; Michigan City, Indiana, U.S.
- Died: May 25, 2007 (aged 78); Springfield, Michigan, U.S.
- Batted: right Threw: right

Teams
- Peoria Redwings (1948–1949); South Bend Blue Sox (1950); Kalamazoo Lassies (1951–1954)

Career highlights and awards
- Championship Title (1954)

Elaine Roth [E] (January 17, 1929 – May 25, 2007) was a female pitcher and outfielder who played from 1948 through 1954 in the All-American Girls Professional Baseball League (AAGPBL). She batted and threw right-handed.

A native of Michigan City, Indiana, Elaine Roth joined the All-American Girls Professional Baseball League with her twin sister Eilaine in 1948, and they played together for three seasons as the dynamic duo (E and I).

Roth spent her career as a pitcher, playing for the Peoria Redwings for two years, before joining the South Bend Blue Sox (1950) and Kalamazoo Lassies (1951–1954). A spot starter and dependable reliever, she posted a career record of 45–69 and was a member of the Champion Team during what turned out to be the league's final 1954 season.

In the first round of the playoffs, fourth-place Kalamazoo surprised second-place South Bend in three games. Pitcher Gloria Cordes hurled and lost the opener, but Nancy Warren and Roth won games two and three, respectively. In the final series, the inspired Lassies defeated the favored Fort Wayne Daisies in five games. Roth was a key contributor in Game 2, pitching 8 2/3 innings of relief.

Roth died in Springfield, Michigan, at the age of 78.

== Pitching statistics ==
GP	W	L	W-L%	ERA	IP	H	R	ER	BB	SO	WHIP
184	45	69	.395	2.94	1028	944	501	336	260	238	1.171
