= Donna Chartier =

American professional baseball player

Donna Chartier (died February 1, 1990) was a utility infielder who played in the All-American Girls Professional Baseball League (AAGPBL).

Donna Chartier appeared as a member of the Kalamazoo Lassies club during its 1953 season. Nevertheless, the league stopped individual achievements after 1948, so individual accomplishments are complete only through 1948. Chartier is part of the AAGPBL permanent display at the Baseball Hall of Fame and Museum at Cooperstown, New York opened in 1988, dedicated to the entire league rather than any individual figure.
