= Rita Keller =

American baseball player

- Shortstop
- Born: January 21, 1933; Kalamazoo, Michigan, U.S.
- Died: August 9, 2005 (aged 72); Kalamazoo, Michigan, U.S.
- Batted: Right Threw: Right

Teams
- Kalamazoo Lassies (1951)

Career highlights and awards
- Women in Baseball – AAGPBL Permanent Display at the Baseball Hall of Fame and Museum (since 1988)

Rita Keller (January 21, 1933 – August 9, 2005) was an American shortstop who played in the All-American Girls Professional Baseball League (AAGPBL). Listed at 5' 3", 115 lb., Keller batted and threw right handed. She was born in Kalamazoo, Michigan.

Keller was assigned to her home team, the Kalamazoo Lassies, during its 1951 season. Additional information is incomplete because there are no records available at the time of the request.

The All-American Girls Professional Baseball League folded in 1954, but there is now a permanent display at the Baseball Hall of Fame and Museum at Cooperstown, New York, since November 5, 1988, that honors those who were part of the league. Rita, along with the rest of the girls and the league staff, is included at the display/exhibit.
