= Mary Taylor (baseball) =

- Outfield / First base
- Born: Long Beach, California, U.S.
- Bats: Right Throws: Right

Teams
- Fort Wayne Daisies (1953); Kalamazoo Lassies (1954)

Career highlights and awards
- Championship team (1954); Two playoff appearances (1953–1954); Women in Baseball – AAGPBL Permanent Display at Baseball Hall of Fame and Museum (1988)

Mary Taylor is a former utility player who played from 1953 through 1954 in the All-American Girls Professional Baseball League (AAGPBL). She batted and threw right-handed.

Born in Long Beach, California, Mary Taylor played with two teams of the All-American Girls Professional Baseball League during the final two years of its existence. She was recruited by Bill Allington for the league in 1953 and was assigned to the Rockford Peaches.

In her rookie season, Taylor served as a backup outfielder and also was used at first base. She batted an average of .238 (38-for-160) with 19 runs batted in and a .338 slugging percentage in 46 games, while her four home runs tied for ninth best in the league. In 1954 she joined the Kalamazoo Lassies, a team who finished in fourth place and surprised first-place Fort Wayne Daisies in the championship series. In decisive Game 5, Taylor had a perfect 5-for-5 game with two doubles, delivering good support to pitcher June Peppas and Kalamazoo that led to an 8–5 victory against the Daisies, during what turned out to be the AAGPBL's last-ever game.

Following her baseball career, Taylor graduated from Pepperdine University and majored in physical education.

She is part of Women in Baseball, a permanent display based at the Baseball Hall of Fame and Museum in Cooperstown, New York, which was unveiled in 1988 to honor the entire All-American Girls Professional Baseball League.

== Career statistics ==
Batting

GP	AB	R	H	2B	3B	HR	RBI	SB	TB	BB	SO	BA	OBP	SLG
79	247	42	62	4	0	4	28	10	78	23	38	.251	.315	.316

Fielding

GP	PO	A	E	TC	DP	FA
77	176	5	13	TC	6	.933
