= Conneaut, Ohio =

City in Ohio, US

- City
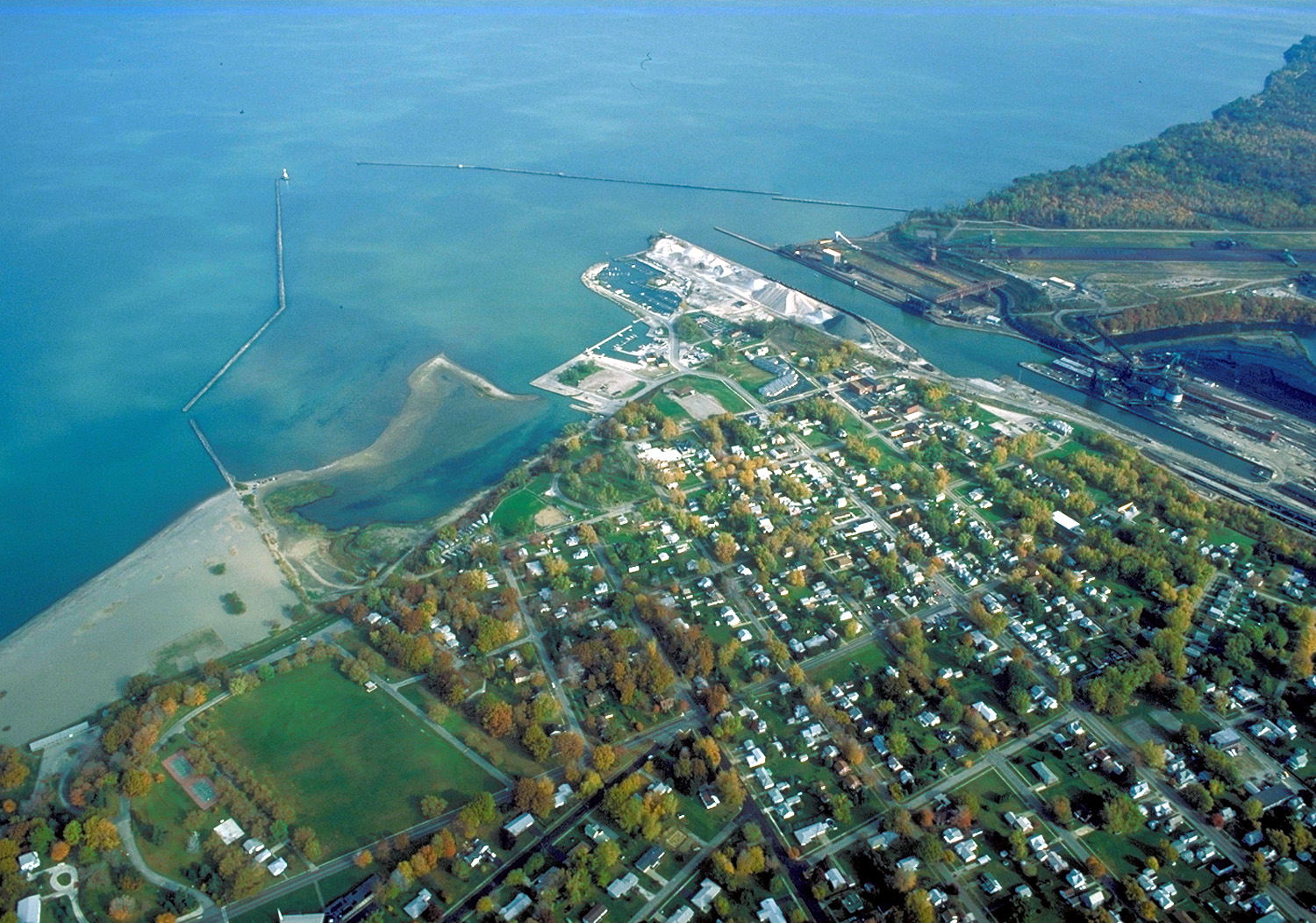
- Aerial view of the port at Conneaut

- Seal
- Motto: "Life's Just Better Here!"
- Interactive map of Conneaut, Ohio
- Location within Ohio Location within the United States
- Coordinates: 41°55′30″N 80°35′25″W
- Country: United States
- State: Ohio
- County: Ashtabula
- Settled: 1799
- Incorporated: 1834 (village); 1902 (city)

Area
  - Total: 26.49 sq mi (68.61 km^{2})
  - Land: 26.42 sq mi (68.44 km^{2})
  - Water: 0.066 sq mi (0.17 km^{2})
- Elevation: 679 ft (207 m)

Population (2020)
  - Total: 12,318
  - Estimate (2023): 12,360
  - Density: 466.1/sq mi (179.98/km^{2})
- Time zone: UTC-5 (Eastern (EST))
  - Summer (DST): UTC-4 (EDT)
- ZIP code: 44030
- Area code: 440
- FIPS code: 39-18350
- GNIS feature ID: 1085723
- Website: www.conneautohio.gov

Conneaut (/ˈkɑːni.ɔːt/KAHN-ee-awt) is a city in Ashtabula County, Ohio, United States. It is settled along Lake Erie at the mouth of Conneaut Creek, 66 miles (106 km) northeast of Cleveland, and is the northernmost city in Ohio. The population was 12,318 at the 2020 census. Conneaut is part of the Cleveland metropolitan area.

== History ==
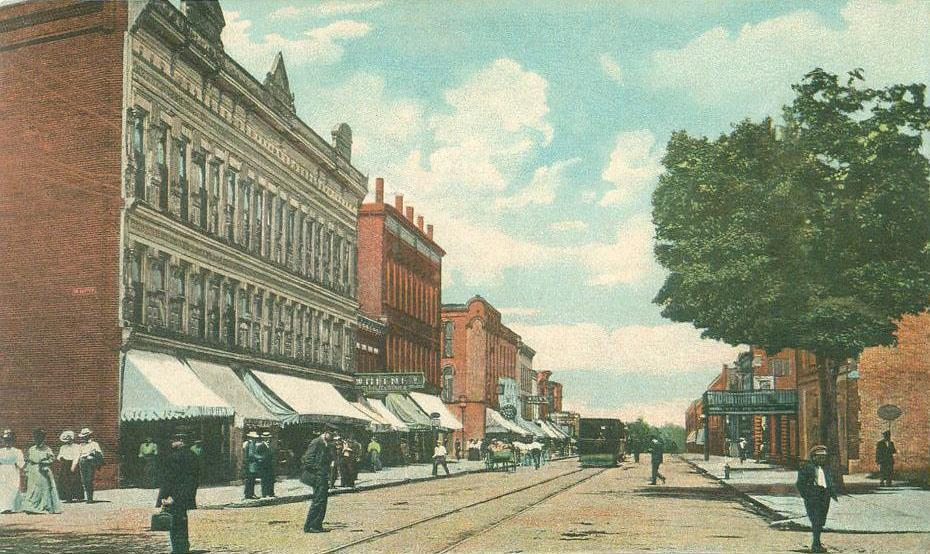
Main Street in 1909

Conneaut is located on an old Native American trail, later used by early westbound pioneers. The name comes from the Seneca language word "Koniyat" and is of disputed meaning. A Mississauga village was located at or near Conneaut in about 1747.

In 1796, surveyors for the Connecticut Land Company built a log storehouse here, but the permanent settlement dates from 1798. In 1832 Conneaut was incorporated, and was described in 1833 as having a printing office, one meeting house, two taverns, and several stores and shops. It became a city in 1898. Conneaut was originally named New Salem, and the parts surrounding it were named "Lakeville" from 1944 to 1964, though these were eventually combined into what is now known as "Conneaut". Parts of Conneaut are sometimes still referred to as Lakeville or Amboy.

On March 27, 1953, a three-train collision near Conneaut killed 21 people.

== Geography ==
According to the United States Census Bureau, the city has a total area of 26.43 square miles (68.45 km^{2}), of which 26.36 square miles (68.27 km^{2}) is land and 0.07 square miles (0.18 km^{2}) is water. Conneaut is situated along Lake Erie at the mouth of Conneaut Creek.

Conneaut is located in the northeasternmost corner of Ohio, bordering the state of Pennsylvania to the east and has 27 square miles (70 km^{2}) within its corporate city limits, making it the 15th-largest city in Ohio by total land area.

Conneaut is a mixture of urban areas and rural farmland. The city has over seven miles (11 km) of shoreline along Lake Erie, with beaches, boating facilities and a healthy summer tourist trade.

=== Climate ===
According to the Köppen climate classification, Conneaut has a continental maritime climate (Cfb) with warm to hot summers and cool to mild winters moderated by Lake Erie. Conneaut experiences seasonal lag due to the proximity of Lake Erie.

== Demographics ==
Historical population
Census	Pop.	Note	%±
1840	2,642		—
1850	818		−69.0%
1860	1,952		138.6%
1870	1,163		−40.4%
1880	1,256		8.0%
1890	3,241		158.0%
1900	7,133		120.1%
1910	8,319		16.6%
1920	9,343		12.3%
1930	9,691		3.7%
1940	9,355		−3.5%
1950	10,230		9.4%
1960	10,567		3.3%
1970	14,552		37.7%
1980	13,839		−4.9%
1990	13,241		−4.3%
2000	12,485		−5.7%
2010	12,841		2.9%
2020	12,318		−4.1%
2023 (est.)	12,360		0.3%
U.S. Decennial Census; 2018 Estimate

=== 2020 census ===
As of the 2020 census, Conneaut had a population of 12,318. The median age was 41.9 years. 18.0% of residents were under the age of 18 and 18.6% of residents were 65 years of age or older. For every 100 females there were 128.6 males, and for every 100 females age 18 and over there were 135.2 males age 18 and over.

89.3% of residents lived in urban areas, while 10.7% lived in rural areas.

There were 4,628 households in Conneaut, of which 24.3% had children under the age of 18 living in them. Of all households, 39.4% were married-couple households, 20.9% were households with a male householder and no spouse or partner present, and 30.2% were households with a female householder and no spouse or partner present. About 34.4% of all households were made up of individuals and 16.7% had someone living alone who was 65 years of age or older.

There were 5,515 housing units, of which 16.1% were vacant. The homeowner vacancy rate was 2.4% and the rental vacancy rate was 9.7%.

Racial composition as of the 2020 census
Race	Number	Percent
White	10,322	83.8%
Black or African American	1,198	9.7%
American Indian and Alaska Native	23	0.2%
Asian	44	0.4%
Native Hawaiian and Other Pacific Islander	4	0.0%
Some other race	110	0.9%
Two or more races	617	5.0%
Hispanic or Latino (of any race)	325	2.6%

=== 2010 census ===
As of the census of 2010, there were 12,841 people, 4,740 households, and 3,034 families living in the city. The population density was 487.1 inhabitants per square mile (188.1/km^{2}). There were 5,702 housing units at an average density of 216.3 per square mile (83.5/km^{2}). The racial makeup of the city was 89.8% White, 7.5% African American, 0.2% Native American, 0.4% Asian, 0.4% from other races, and 1.8% from two or more races. Hispanic or Latino of any race were 1.8% of the population.

There were 4,740 households, of which 29.2% had children under the age of 18 living with them, 44.2% were married couples living together, 14.2% had a female householder with no husband present, 5.7% had a male householder with no wife present, and 36.0% were non-families. 30.3% of all households were made up of individuals, and 14% had someone living alone who was 65 years of age or older. The average household size was 2.37 and the average family size was 2.90.

The median age in the city was 39.6 years. 20.2% of residents were under the age of 18; 9.2% were between the ages of 18 and 24; 28.2% were from 25 to 44; 26.5% were from 45 to 64; and 15.7% were 65 years of age or older. The gender makeup of the city was 54.4% male and 45.6% female.

=== 2000 census ===
As of the census of 2000, there were 12,485 people, 5,038 households, and 3,410 families living in the city. The population density was 473.4 inhabitants per square mile (182.8/km^{2}). There were 5,710 housing units at an average density of 216.5 per square mile (83.6/km^{2}). The racial makeup of the city was 96.33% White, 1.12% African American, 0.18% Native American, 0.47% Asian, 0.05% Pacific Islander, 0.23% from other races, and 1.61% from two or more races. Hispanic or Latino of any race were 1.06% of the population. 19.7% were of German, 16.0% Italian, 13.7% English, 12.0% Irish, 6.2% American and 6.2% Finnish ancestry according to Census 2000. There were 5,038 households, out of which 30.4% had children under the age of 18 living with them, 52.3% were married couples living together, 11.4% had a female householder with no husband present, and 32.3% were non-families. 27.9% of all households were made up of individuals, and 13.5% had someone living alone who was 65 years of age or older. The average household size was 2.45 and the average family size was 2.98.

In the city the population was spread out, with 25.2% under the age of 18, 7.7% from 18 to 24, 27.5% from 25 to 44, 22.4% from 45 to 64, and 17.2% who were 65 years of age or older. The median age was 38 years. For every 100 females, there were 94.2 males. For every 100 females age 18 and over, there were 89.4 males.

The median income for a household in the city was $31,717, and the median income for a family was $37,955. Males had a median income of $31,964 versus $21,198 for females. The per capita income for the city was $14,703. About 10.7% of families and 13.0% of the population were below the poverty line, including 20.3% of those under age 18 and 9.1% of those age 65 or over.

== Economy ==
Major industries within the city include CSP of Ohio (formerly Venture Industries), General Aluminum (automotive parts), and CW Ohio (windows and pillars). The city's historic business district and its harbor business district are not as thriving as in the past. A few of the main businesses that anchor the downtown are Gerdes Pharmacy and Orlando Brothers grocery store. From 1944 until 2000, the Astatic Corporation was a major manufacturer of microphones. Astatic merged CAD (Conneaut Audio Devices) in 2000 which continues to produce microphones. Conneaut is also home to the Lake Erie Correctional Institution, which has a total staff of 295 employees as of February 2020. The port of Conneaut, Ohio is the loading point for train cars bearing iron ore for Pittsburgh area steel mills, including the Edgar Thomson Works.

== Arts and culture ==
Conneaut has held an annual D-Day reenactment every summer since 1999.

== Government ==
The city operates under a council-manager government.

== Education ==
It is in the Conneaut Area City School District. The District includes the Conneaut High School.

== Transportation ==
Transportation services in Conneaut are provided via Interstate 90, which bisects the city, along with an international shipping port and three railroads. U.S Route 20 also bisects Conneaut. Ohio State Route 7 has its northern terminus on Conneaut, where it intersects with State Route 531.

== Notable people ==
- Laura Boulton, eminent ethnologist, anthropologist and film-maker
- Mary L. Doe, first president of Michigan State Equal Suffrage Association
- Mildred Gillars, American radio personality (Axis Sally) during World War II
- Osee M. Hall, U.S. House Representative from Minnesota
- Althea Hunt, educator and theater director at the College of William & Mary
- Joseph Russell Jones, appointed by Ulysses S. Grant as Minister Resident to Belgium
- Larry Kelley, football player for Yale University
- Jean Lovell, All-American Girls Professional Baseball League player
- John P. McGoorty, Illinois judge and state representative
- Mike Palagyi, MLB pitcher for Washington Senators
- John R. Pillion, Republican member of U.S. House of Representatives from New York
- George Morton Randall, United States Army general
- Abigail Salisbury member Pennsylvania House of Representatives
- Mason A. Thayer, Republican member of Wisconsin State Assembly
- Doug Tompkins, co-founder of The North Face and Esprit

== Gallery ==
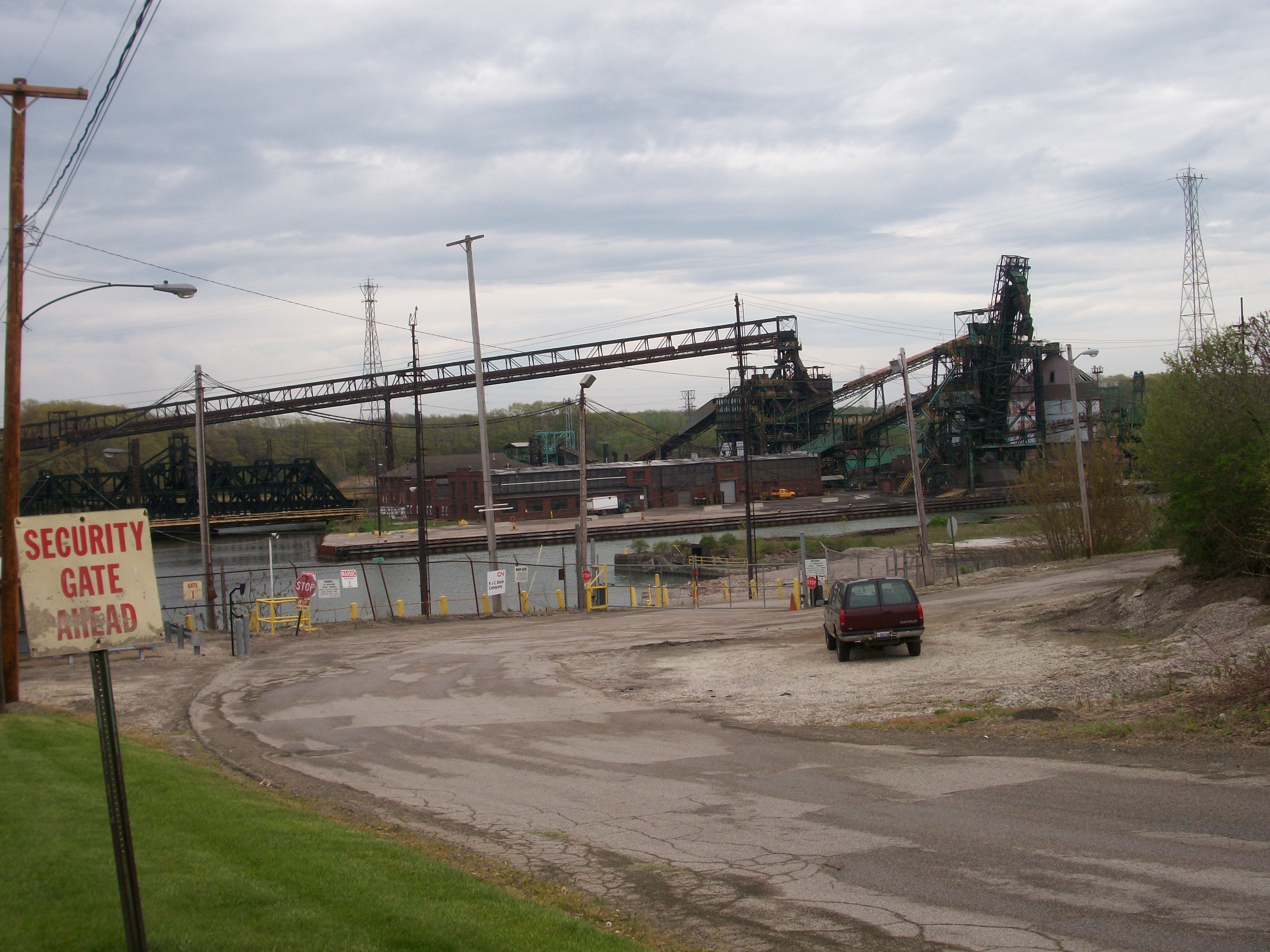
Industry related to the shipping of ores

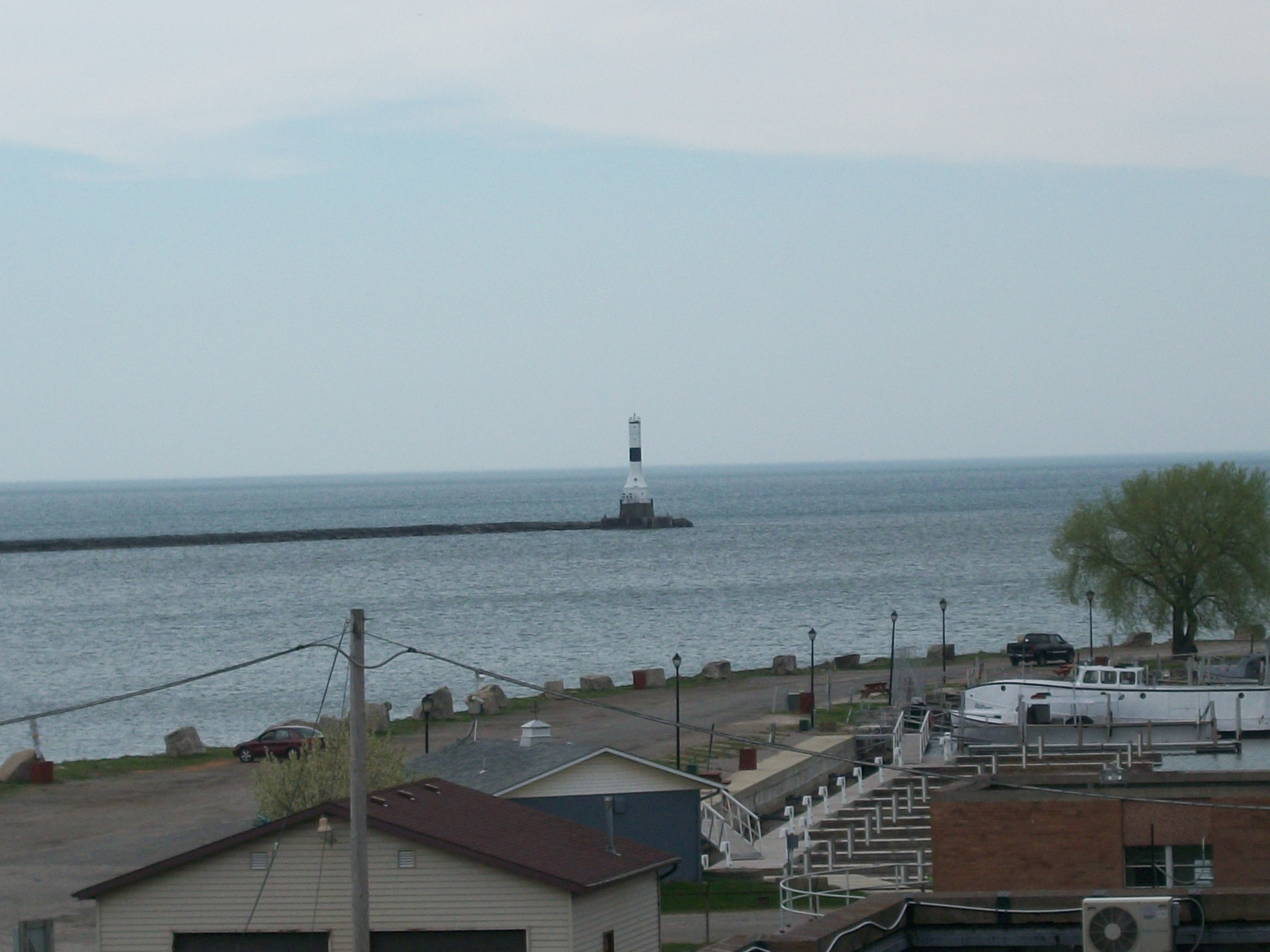
Conneaut lighthouse

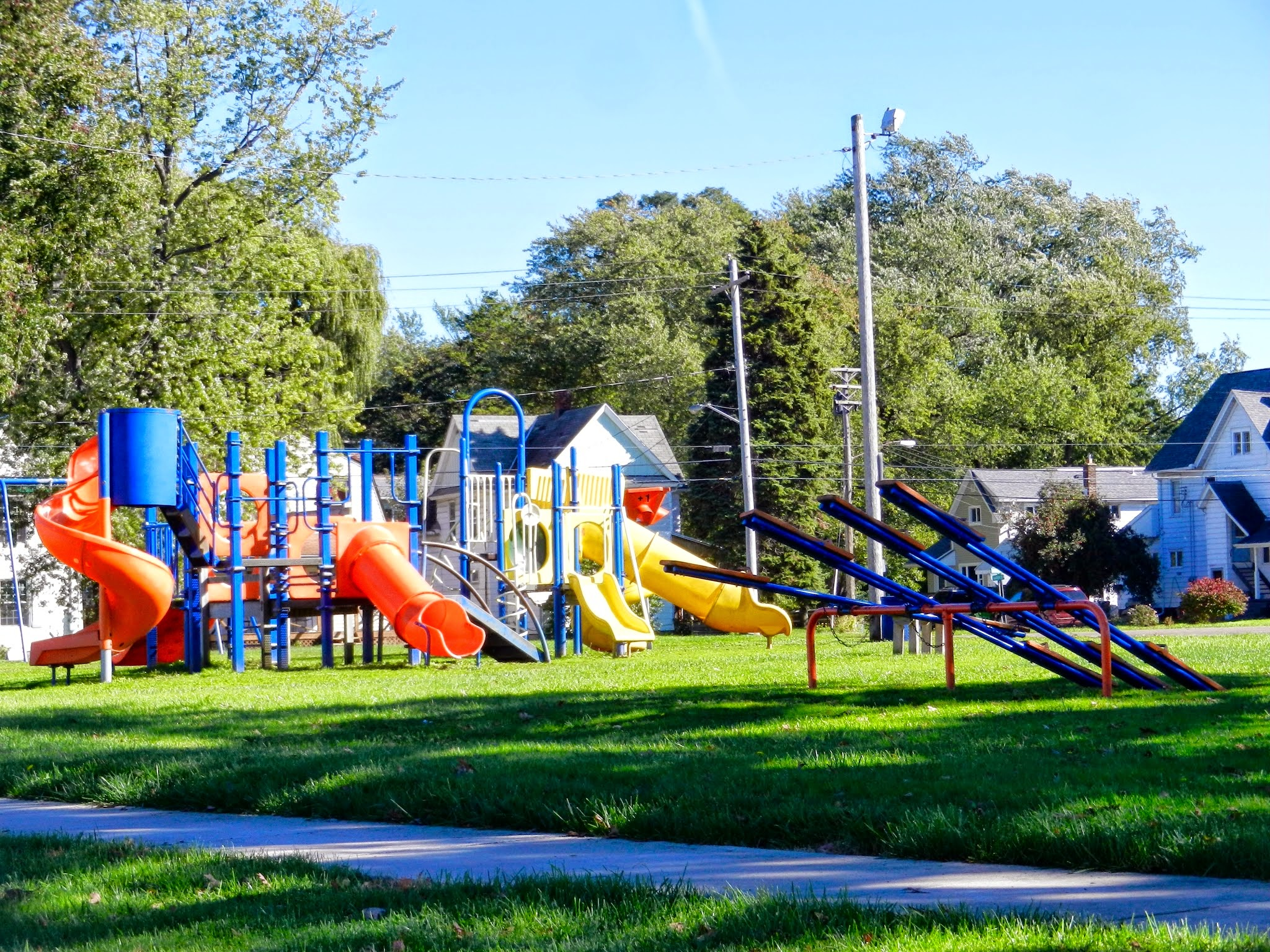
A modern-day playground.

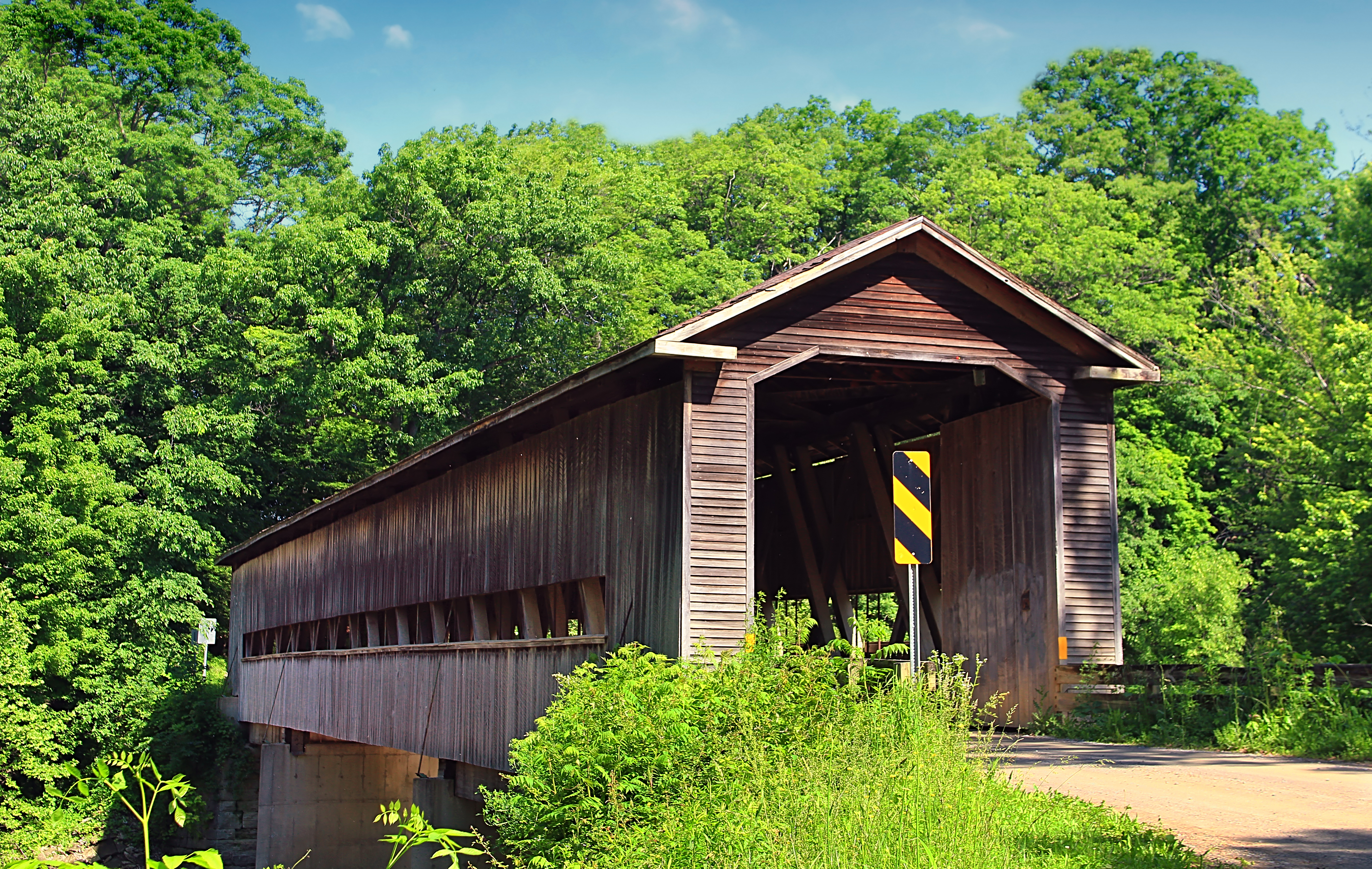
Middle Road Covered Bridge

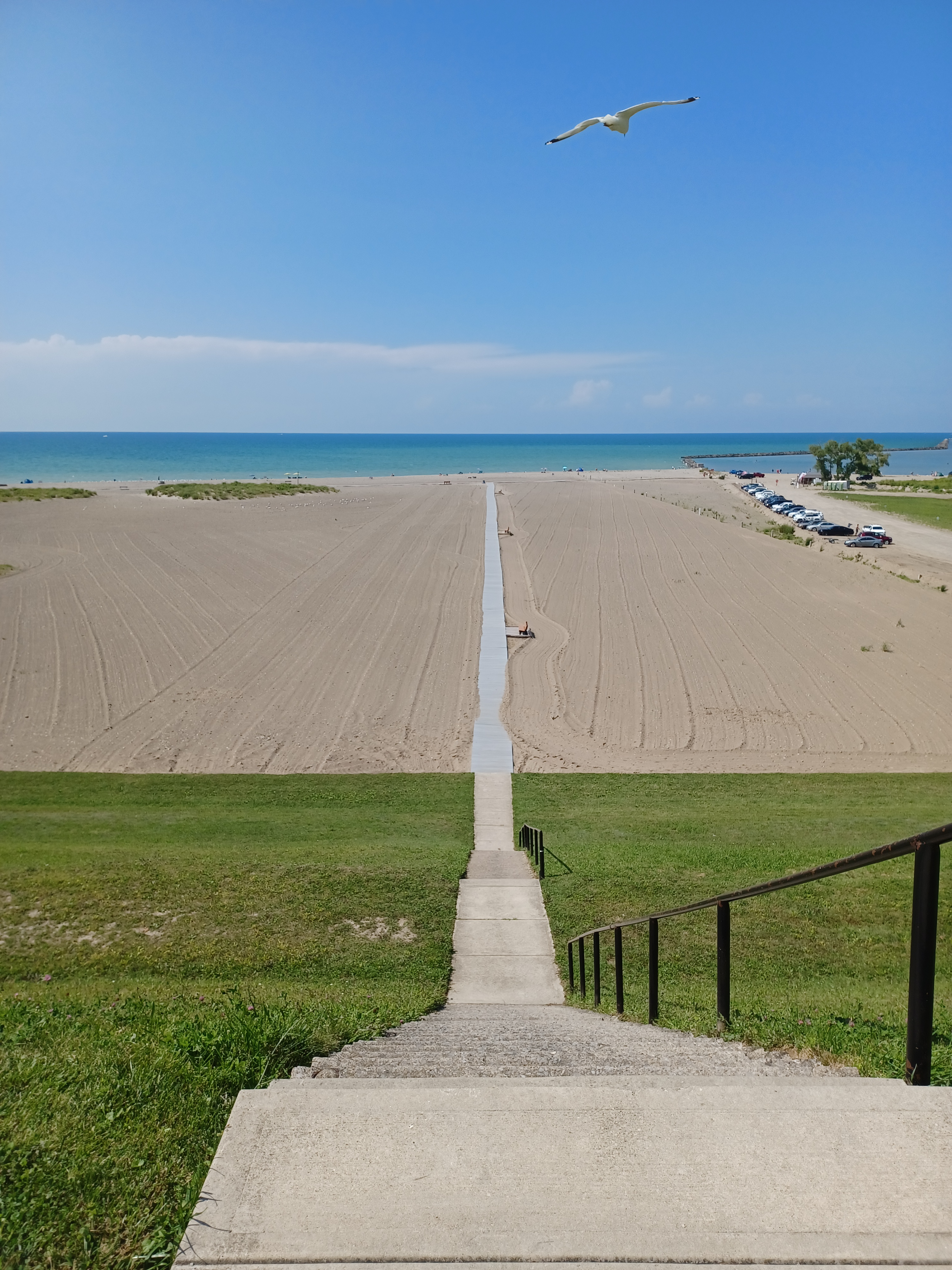
Steps to beach at Conneaut Township Park
