= Dorothy Schroeder =

American baseball player

- Shortstop
- Born: April 11, 1928; Sadorus, Illinois, U.S.
- Died: December 8, 1996 (aged 68); Champaign, Illinois, U.S.
- Batted: Right Threw: Right

AAGPBL debut
- 1943, for the South Bend Blue Sox

Last AAGPBL appearance
- 1954, for the Kalamazoo Lassies

AAGPBL statistics
- Games played: 1249
- Runs batted in: 431
- Walks: 696
- Hits: 870
- Home runs: 42
- Stolen bases: 372

Teams
- South Bend Blue Sox (1943–1945); Kenosha Comets (1945–1947); Fort Wayne Daisies (1947–1952); Kalamazoo Lassies (1953–1954)

Career highlights and awards
- 3× All-Star (1952–1954); AAGPBL Championship (1943, 1954); All-time leader in games, RBI and walks

Dorothy "Dottie" Schroeder (April 11, 1928 – December 8, 1996) was an American shortstop who played from 1943 through 1954 in the All-American Girls Professional Baseball League (AAGPBL). Listed at 5 ft 7 in (1.70 m), 150 lb., Schroeder batted and threw right-handed. She was born in Sadorus, Illinois.

== Career ==
At age fifteen, Schroeder became the youngest founding member of the All-American Girls Professional Baseball League, thus having the distinction of being the only girl to play in the league for its twelve full seasons. A three-time All-Star and ranked in the Top-10 in several offensive categories, she was arguably the top shortstop in league history. After the league folded in 1954, she played four more years on a touring team of 11 All-Americans piloted by Bill Allington across Canada and United States. When the lack of finances caused the tour to end after four summers, Schroeder had played a record 15 seasons of professional baseball.

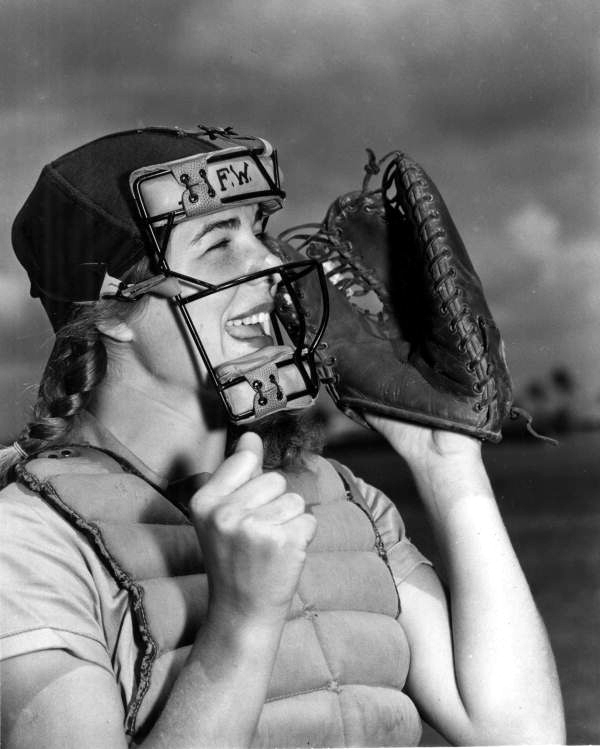
Schroeder in 1948

The AAGBL flourished in the 1940s when the Major Leagues went on hold as men went to war. Women have been playing professional baseball since the late 1930s, yet it was not really a well known fact until the 1992 film A League of Their Own, directed by Penny Marshall and starred by Geena Davis, Tom Hanks, Madonna, Lori Petty and Rosie O'Donnell, that brought these women ballplayers into the public eye.

Schroeder was the daughter of a German farmer and local postmaster at Champaign. She had an older brother, Walter, and a twin brother, Don. Dorothy was nine years old when their family moved to Sadorus, Illinois. She attended St. Paul's Lutheran Church in nearby Sadorus and sang in the choir. By then, she started to play baseball with her two brothers and her father, who had also managed a semi-pro baseball team of Champaign. In 1939, the young girl played on a fastpitch softball team and joined the Illinois Commercial College team in 1940.

At 15, Schroeder decided to play professional baseball after reading about the AAGPBL in a Chicago Tribune advertisement. She personified the family background, values, dreams and aspirations that the AAGPLB founders attempted to cultivate, so that her parents insisted on close supervision before permitting her to join the new league. In 1943, she attended the first tryout camp at Sportsman's Park in St. Louis, where she competed against 60 girls for one of two roster spots. The final tryouts were held at Wrigley Field in Chicago.

Schroeder entered the league in 1943 with the South Bend Blue Sox, playing for them two and a half years before joining the Kenosha Comets (1945-'47), Fort Wayne Daisies (1947-'52) and Kalamazoo Lassies (1953-'54). In her first season, she led the league shortstops in fielding average, collected 32 stolen bases and hit a respectable .211 batting average, considering that the league used an underhand pitch in what could only be called classic dead-ball-era fashion. She also had 56 hits with 44 runs and 56 walks to her credit.

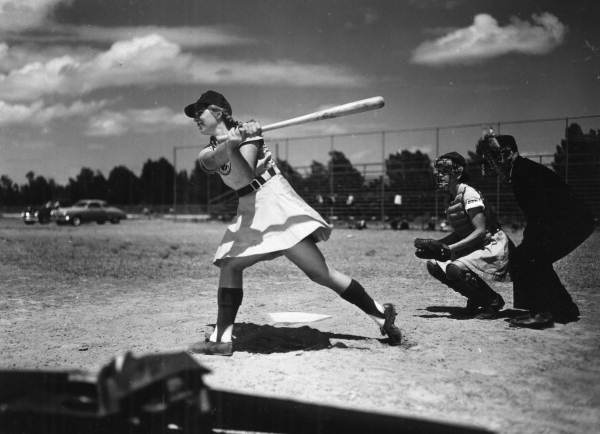
Schroeder getting a hit- Opa-locka, Florida on April 22, 1948

In 1944 Schroeder stole 70 bases. Failing to hit .200 in each of her first six seasons and totalling four home runs in that time, she became a fine hitter with power in her later years after the league switched to overhand pitching. From 1949 through 1954 she hit a combined .242 average (509-for-2095); tying for third place with five home runs in 1950, and finishing fourth in 1951 with four homers. In 1952, she was again fourth with six dingers and her average raised to .245, while earning her first of three consecutive selections to the AAGPBL All-Star Team.

In 1953, Schroeder saw her average climb to .285 and tied for fourth with six home runs. She also was named the Most Valuable Player of the Daisies, after helping her team to win the regular season title with a 67–42 mark. But after an exciting series, Jean Faut led the South Bend club to win the Championship Title.

Schroeder enjoyed her most productive season in 1954, when she posted career-highs with .304, 17 homers and 65 runs batted in. In that season, she was part of a Lassies All-Star slick infield that included June Peppas at first base, Nancy Mudge at second, and Fern Shollenberger at third. Meanwhile, the called Home Run Twins, Chris Ballingall (17) and Carol Habben (15), powered the offense with 32 home runs; Peppas enjoyed a year career, and Kalamazoo advanced to the Championship Series. As a result, the Lassies defeated the Daisies in a best-of-five games series, with a decisive eight-inning RBI double by Schroeder in Game 5, during what turned out to be the AAGPBL final season.

In addition to playing 16 professional baseball seasons, Schroeder holds all-time records for most games played (1,249), at-bats (4,129), RBI (431) and walks (696) in AAGPBL history. She also ranks second in hits (870) and third in home runs (42). Defensively, she was impenetrable, leading three times the AAGPBL shortstops in fielding, collecting 2,579 outs and 3,376 assists for a .913 career average.

== Life after baseball ==
Schroeder, who never married, is one of the few All-Americans pictured individually in the exhibit on Women in Baseball at the National Baseball Hall of Fame and Museum in Cooperstown, New York, which was created in 1988. She lived the rest of her life in her home town of Champaign, working for Collegiate Cap & Gown Company for 36 years until retiring in 1993. She died three years later, at the age of 68, following complications of a brain aneurysm.

== Batting statistics ==
GP	AB	R	H	HR	RBI	SB	BB	SO	BA	OBP
1249	4129	571	870	42	431	372	696	566	.211	.325

== Commentary ==
- Dottie Schroeder probably received more media attention and signed more autographs than any other All-American. An appropriate symbol of the feminine character of a league which wanted girls to look like women but play ball like men, her pretty portrait adorned the cover of Parade Magazine in August 1948. Jim Sargent, baseball researcher and historian.

== Sources ==
- All-American Girls Professional Baseball League Record Book – W. C. Madden. Publisher: McFarland & Company, 2000. Format: Paperback, 294pp. Language: English. ISBN 0-7864-3747-2. ISBN 978-0-7864-3747-4
- Women of the All-American Girls Professional Baseball League: A Biographical Dictionary - W. C. Madden. Publisher: McFarland & Company, 2005. Format: Paperback, 295 pp. Language: English. ISBN 0-7864-3747-2. ISBN 978-0-7864-2263-0
- Biographical Dictionary of American Sports. Vol. 3: Baseball, Q-Z - David L. Porter. Publisher: Greenwood Pub Group, 1987. Language: English. ISBN 0-313-31176-5. ISBN 978-0-313-31176-5
