= Donna Becker =

American baseball player (1932–2023)

- Pitcher
- Born: August 6, 1932; Kenosha, Wisconsin, U.S.
- Died: September 27, 2023 (aged 91); Kenosha, Wisconsin, U.S.
- Batted: Right Threw: Right

Teams
- Kalamazoo Lassies (1951)

Career highlights and awards
- Women in Baseball – AAGPBL Permanent Display at the Baseball Hall of Fame and Museum (since 1988)

Donna Becker (August 6, 1932 – September 27, 2023) was an American pitcher who played in the All-American Girls Professional Baseball League (AAGPBL). She batted and threw right handed.

According to All-American Girls Professional Baseball League data, Becker was assigned to the Kalamazoo Lassies club in its 1951 season. Nevertheless, she did not have individual records or some information was incomplete at the time of the request.

The All-American Girls Professional Baseball League folded in 1954, but there is now a permanent display at the Baseball Hall of Fame and Museum at Cooperstown, New York, since November 5, 1988, that honors those who were part of this unique experience. Donna, along with the rest of the girls and the league staff, is included at the display/exhibit. Becker died in Kenosha on September 27, 2023, at the age of 91.
