= Ange Armato =

American baseball player (1929–2026)

- Second base
- Born: October 27, 1929; Rockford, Illinois, U.S.
- Died: June 21, 2026 (aged 96); Rockford, Illinois, U.S.
- Batted: Right Threw: Right
- Stats at Baseball Reference

Teams
- Rockford Peaches (1949); Kalamazoo Lassies (1953)

Ange Lou Armato (October 27, 1929 – June 21, 2026) was an American baseball infielder who played in the All-American Girls Professional Baseball League (AAGPBL).

== Biography ==
Born in Rockford, Illinois, Ange Armato was the seventh girl out of eight children from a large Italian family. In high school, her career dream was to be an artist, so her parents sent her to art school. During that period of time, Armato went to her first baseball game and she was hooked. She then practiced with the Rockford Peaches for three years and went to school in Chicago. In the process, Armato signed a contract and joined the Peaches in 1949, but due to an injury, she was unable to complete the season.

In 1953 Armato returned to the league and was assigned to the Kalamazoo Lassies. She only had two hits in 26 at-bats for a .077 average, but was a sure-handed fielder at second base. Kalamazoo ended the season in third place with a 56–50 record and defeated the Fort Wayne Daisies in the first round, two to one games, but lost to the Grand Rapids Chicks in the final series in just two games.

From 1988 Armato became part of Women in Baseball, a permanent display based at the Baseball Hall of Fame and Museum in Cooperstown, New York, which was unveiled to honor the entire All-American Girls Professional Baseball League rather than individual baseball personalities. In 1991, Armato appeared briefly in the film A League of Their Own as part of the AAGPBL veterans reunited in Cooperstown during the shooting of the film, playing at shortstop for the blue team.

Armato died on June 21, 2026, at the age of 96.
