= Mike Palagyi =

American baseball player (1917-2013)

- Pitcher
- Born: July 4, 1917; Conneaut, Ohio, U.S.
- Died: November 21, 2013 (aged 96); Conneaut, Ohio, U.S.
- Batted: Right Threw: Right

MLB debut
- August 18, 1939, for the Washington Senators

Last MLB appearance
- August 18, 1939, for the Washington Senators

MLB statistics
- Win–loss record: 0–0
- Earned run average: infinite
- Strikeouts: 0
- Stats at Baseball Reference

Teams
- Washington Senators (1939)

Michael Raymond Palagyi (July 4, 1917 – November 21, 2013) was an American Major League Baseball pitcher who pitched for the Washington Senators. He is in a group of over 1,500 players who have appeared in exactly one Major League game. At the time of his death, he was the oldest of those one-game players.

== Early life ==
Palagyi was one of ten children born to Joseph and Anna Palagyi. His seven brothers were Jim, John, George, Lewis, Andrew, Peter and Joseph. Mike's sisters included Anna Yusko, Ethel Vento, and Helen who died at birth and twin to brother Andrew. Mike was not the only member to play professional baseball in the family. His brother George Palagyi played minor league ball for the Cleveland Indians as a pitcher. Mike would later go on to marry his wife Margaret. They had one child Michael, who died in a plane crash in the 1970s. Mike was a devote Catholic and belonged to Corpus Christi Parish in Conneaut. He attended mass regularly at St. Mary Church and was buried out of St. Frances Cabrini Church. He was the last living of his brothers.

== Career ==
Standing 6 feet 2 inches (1.88 m) and weighing 185 pounds (84 kg), Palagyi made his major league pitching debut August 18, 1939 for the Washington Senators as a relief pitcher in a game against the Boston Red Sox. Coming in to the game to start the top of the ninth, with the Red Sox ahead 3-1, he began by walking Doc Cramer. Then Palagyi faced three future Hall of Fame members: Jimmie Foxx, Ted Williams and Joe Cronin. He hit Foxx with a pitch and walked Williams and Cronin. The walk to Cronin forced Cramer across the plate; Palagyi was lifted from the game at this point. Two other runners allowed by Palagyi would also score, and the Senators would lose the game by a final score of 6-2, but Palagyi did not receive the loss in that game. He would never play in another major league game. In an interview for Richard Tellis' book, Once Around the Bases, Palagyi said that he "threw but 2 strikes out of 15 pitches — a very short big league career".

After leaving baseball, Palagyi served during World War II. Palagyi lived in Conneaut until his death in 2013.

== Distinctions ==
Since Palagyi allowed three earned runs without retiring a batter, his career earned run average (ERA) is infinite. He is one of at least 19 pitchers with an infinite ERA.

Palagyi and Mark Wagner are the only major-league players born in Conneaut. Both players pitched in exactly one game in relief. Wagner, however, appeared in other games as a shortstop.
