= Sadorus, Illinois =

Sadorus
- Village
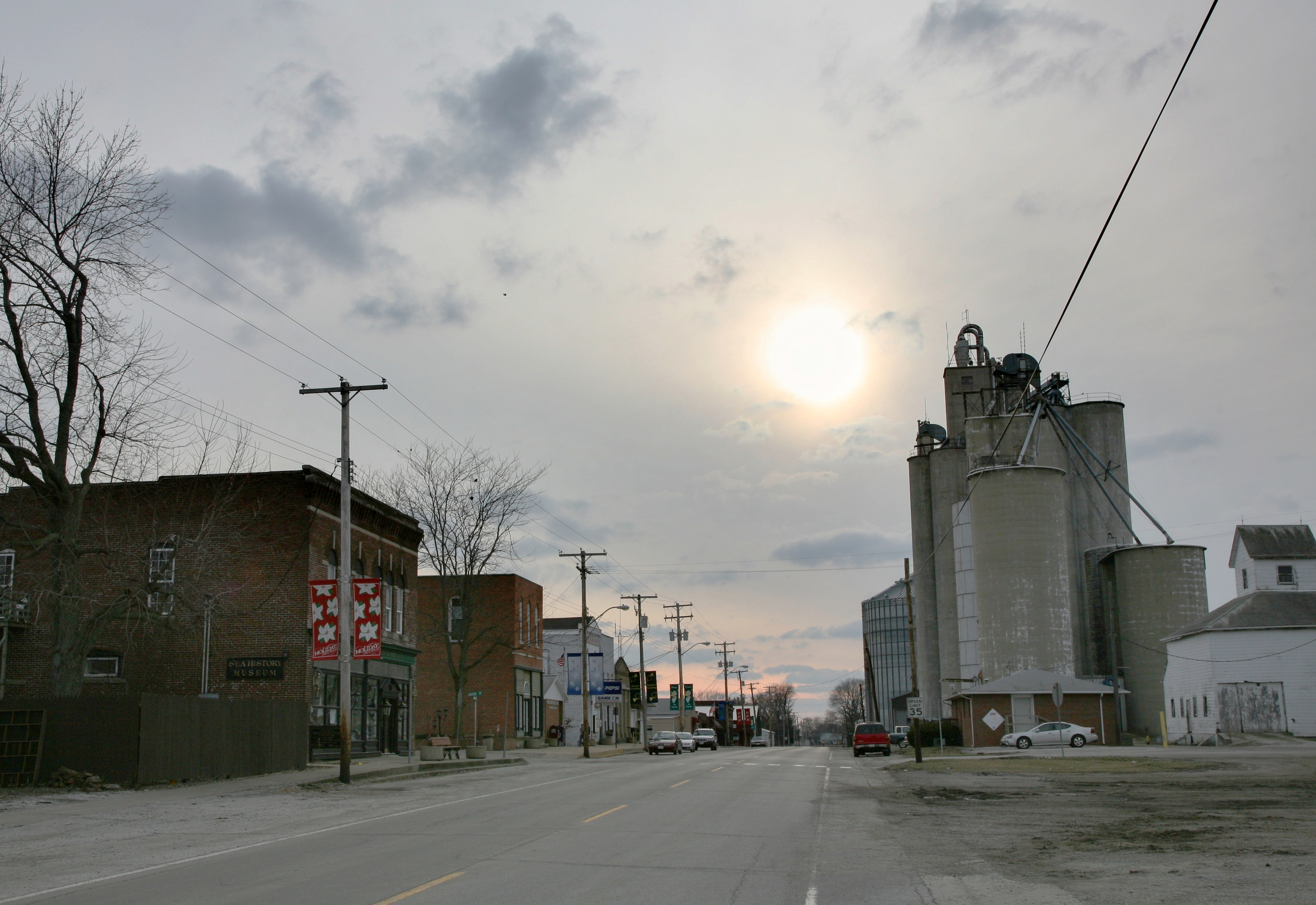
- Entering Sadorus

- Location of Sadorus in Champaign County, Illinois.

- Location within Champaign County Sadorus (Illinois)
- Coordinates: 39°58′01″N 88°20′43″W
- Country: United States
- State: Illinois
- County: Champaign

Area
  - Total: 1.03 sq mi (2.66 km^{2})
  - Land: 1.03 sq mi (2.66 km^{2})
  - Water: 0 sq mi (0.00 km^{2})
- Elevation: 692 ft (211 m)

Population (2020)
  - Total: 402
  - Density: 391.3/sq mi (151.08/km^{2})
- Time zone: UTC-6 (CST)
  - Summer (DST): UTC-5 (CDT)
- Zip code: 61872
- Area code: 217
- FIPS code: 17-66534
- GNIS feature ID: 2399154
- Website: www.sadorus.com

Sadorus is a village in Champaign County, Illinois, United States. The population was 402 at the 2020 census. Sadorus was the first town founded in Champaign County.

== History ==
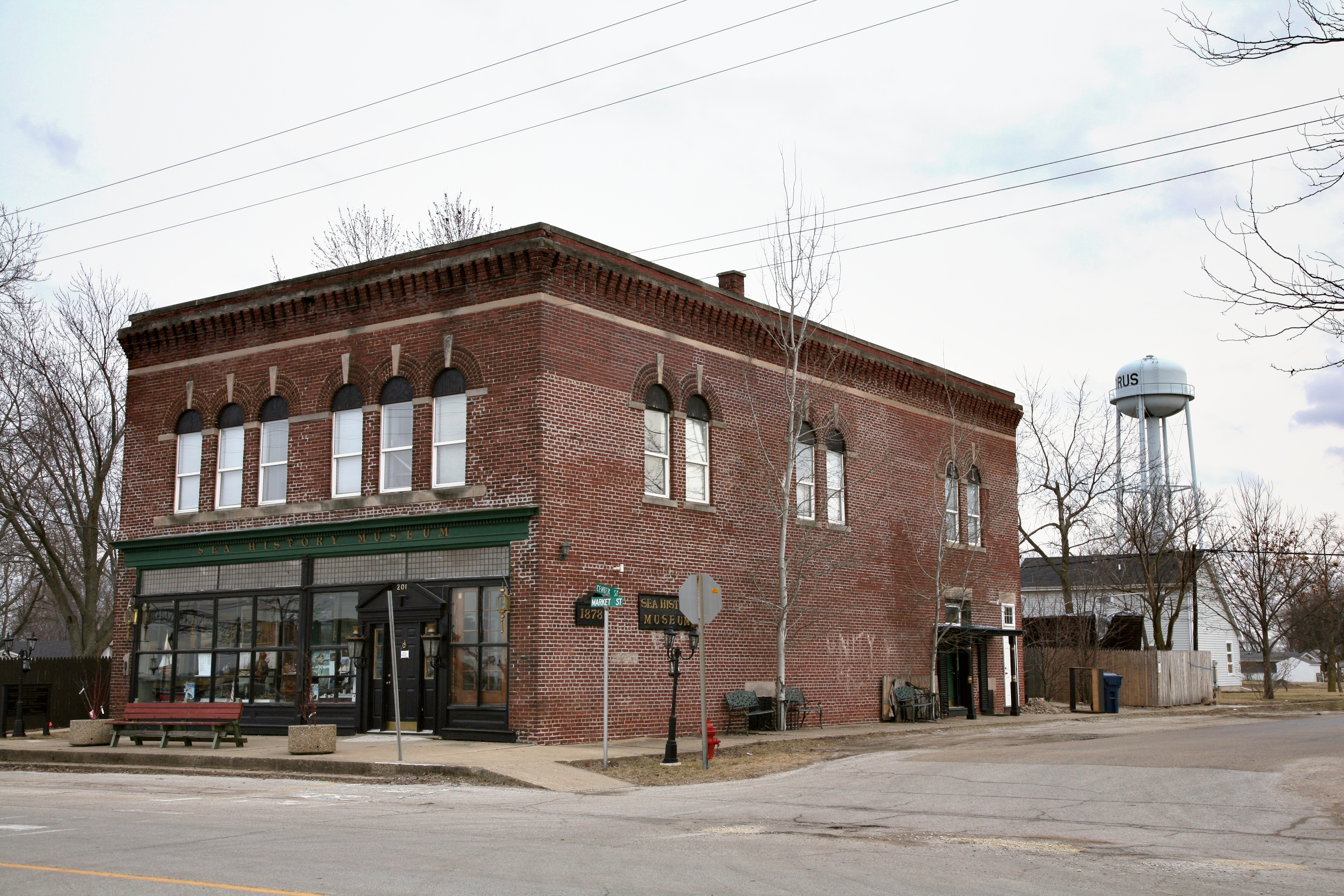
National Museum of Ship Models and Sea History

=== Settlement ===
Sadorus Grove was settled in April 1824 by Henry Sadorus, and was the first town founded in Champaign County. It was platted in 1837 by William Sadorus as the town of Sadorus.

=== Train wreck ===
There was a train wreck as a train was passing through the town on February 21, 2011. Two grain cars tipped over and another three or four cars derailed into a nearby field. The train had already passed through the residential area of the town when it derailed so nobody was injured. It is believed that soggy soil underneath the tracks caused the derailment.

== Geography ==
According to the 2021 census gazetteer files, Sadorus has a total area of 1.03 square miles (2.67 km^{2}), all land.

== Demographics ==
Historical population
Census	Pop.	Note	%±
1880	250		—
1890	277		10.8%
1900	340		22.7%
1910	336		−1.2%
1920	413		22.9%
1930	353		−14.5%
1940	371		5.1%
1950	388		4.6%
1960	384		−1.0%
1970	454		18.2%
1980	435		−4.2%
1990	469		7.8%
2000	426		−9.2%
2010	416		−2.3%
2020	402		−3.4%
U.S. Decennial Census

As of the 2020 census, there were 402 people, 156 households and 88 families residing in the village. The population density was 391.43 per square mile (151.13/km^{2}). There were 171 housing units at an average density of 166.50 per square mile (64.29/km^{2}). The racial makeup of the village was 88.56% White, 1.49% Native American, 0.25% from other races, and 9.70% from two or more races. Hispanic or Latino of any race were 2.24% of the population.

There were 156 households, of which 24.4% had children under the age of 18 living with them, 36.54% were married couples living together, 10.26% had a female householder with no husband present and 43.59% were non-families. 30.77% of all households were made up of individuals and 24.36% had someone living alone who was 65 years of age or older. The average household size was 2.92 and the average family size was 2.29.

18.5% of the population were under the age of 18, 3.4% from 18 to 24, 17.9% from 25 to 44, 31.4% from 45 to 64 and 28.9% were 65 years of age or older. The median age was 53.6 years. For every 100 females, there were 123.1 males. For every 100 females age 18 and over, there were 120.5 males.

The median household income was $49,500 and the median family income was $78,750. Males had a median income of $42,500 and females $20,000. The per capita income was $29,109. About 3.4% of families and 6.2% of the population were below the poverty line, including 13.6% of those under age 18 and none of those age 65 or over.

== Notable landmarks ==
Sadorus Rock is a large boulder that was in a local field. It was moved from the field to the front of the Sadorus Park around 2003. Formally known as "Pioneer Rock", it was renamed "Sadorus Rock" and dedicated to Henry Sadorus on October 30, 1932. The large rock was deposited by melting glaciers in the relatively un-rocky fields of Champaign county during the end of the last ice age.

== Notable places ==
The National Museum of Ship Models and Sea History, a non-profit museum that opened in 2001, contains ship models and rare maritime texts.

== Education ==
It is in the Tolono Community Unit School District 7.

== Notable people ==
- Jennie Garth, actress appearing in Beverly Hills, 90210 and What I Like About You
- Dorothy Schroeder, AAGPBL All-star player in the National Baseball Hall of Fame and Museum
