= Jean Lovell =

- Catcher / Pitcher
- Born: November 21, 1926; Conneaut, Ohio, U.S.
- Died: January 1, 1992 (aged 65); Amboy, Ohio, U.S.
- Batted: Right Threw: Right

Teams
- Rockford Peaches (1948–'49); Kalamazoo Lassies (1950–'51, 1952–'54); Kenosha Comets (1951)

Career highlights and awards
- All-Star Team (1953); Three-time AAGPBL Championship Title (1948-'49, 1954); Holds home runs all-time records for catchers both in career (25) and regular season (21); Women in Baseball – AAGPBL Permanent Display Baseball Hall of Fame and Museum (1988)

Jean Lovell [″Grumpy″] (November 21, 1926 – January 1, 1992) was an American baseball catcher and pitcher who played for three different teams of the All-American Girls Professional Baseball League between the 1948 and 1954 seasons. Lovell batted and threw right-handed. Sometimes she is credited as Jean Dowler.

== Early life ==
A native of Conneaut, Ohio, Lovell attended elementary school at Amboy Township. While she spent some time at Conneaut High School, her family moved just east into Pennsylvania and she ended up graduating from Abington High School. She played high-level competitive softball after graduation, mostly in Conneaut and Painesville before making the jump to the All-American Girls Professional Baseball League.

== Professional career ==
Lovell was a member of three AAGPBL Champion Teams and ended her eight-year career with 25 home runs, more than any catcher in the league's history and good enough to rank her 10th in the all-time list. In addition, she was selected to the 1953 All-Star Team.

Lovell entered the AAGPBL in 1948 with the Rockford Peaches, winning back-to-back championships with the Peaches 1948-'49 teams. While having played only 52 and 26 games in her first two professional seasons, she became a full-time player after moving to the Kalamazoo Lassies, playing for them in 1950 and 1951. She was traded to the Kenosha Comets for the second half of the 1951 season, but rejoined the Lassies in the summer of 1952, with whom she played the rest of her career, including for the 1954 champion team.

In her final season, Lovell said goodbye in a meaningful way when the ball was reduced to Major League size. She posted a .286 batting average with 21 home runs and 69 runs batted in, to reach all career goals. Those 21 longballs served to lead the league in that season, and also accounted for all but four of her 25 career home runs, which ended up being the most by any catcher in the history of the league. That season she was a member of the All-Star Team who faced the Fort Wayne Daisies host team.

Lovell played both battery positions, but was a much better receiver, despite playing with sore knees for a while. In addition, she had an appendectomy that limited her to 55 games during the 1952 season. At age 28, though, her professional career came to an end — as was the case for all of the players in the league — as the curtain came down on the AAGPBL as it folded.

== Personal life ==
Following her playing retirement, Lovell returned to Conneaut and married Harold Dowler in 1959. The couple lived a full, adventurous life together. Both played golf and bowling, raised German Shorthaired Pointers, and she also rode motorcycles. But in her later years, she was beset by a renal failure, which forced her to dialysis. Eventually, she suffered complications from diabetes. She died in Amboy, Ohio, at the age of 65, and is buried in Waterford Cemetery at Erie County, Pennsylvania.

== Regular season statistics ==
Batting

GP	AB	R	H	2B	3B	HR	RBI	SB	BB	SO	BA	OBP	SLG
470	1376	174	315	39	6	25	174	11	140	131	.229	.300	.321

Fielding

PO	A	E	TC	DP	FA
1376	253	77	1706	33	.955

Pitching

W	L	W-L%	ERA	GP	IP	H	R	ER	SO	BB
3	10	.231	4.18	18	113	103	83	52	17	60

== Postseason statistics ==
Batting

GP	AB	R	H	2B	3B	HR	RBI	SB	BA	SLG
15	53	5	17	1	0	1	7	0	.321	.396

Fielding

G	PO	A	E	TC	FA
12	11	17	5	33	.844

== Book excerpt ==
- Author Susan E. Johnson, a sociology professor and devoted fan of the Rockford Peaches, wrote in her 1994 book When Women Played Hardball the next commentary: Jean ordered an arrangement of yellow roses with her catcher’s mitt inside of it, and when they closed the lid of her casket for the final time, her catcher’s mitt went inside with her.
