= Springfield, Michigan =

- City
- Seal

- Location of Springfield, Michigan
- Coordinates: 42°19′25″N 85°13′51″W
- Country: United States
- State: Michigan
- County: Calhoun

Area
  - Total: 3.70 sq mi (9.58 km^{2})
  - Land: 3.66 sq mi (9.49 km^{2})
  - Water: 0.039 sq mi (0.10 km^{2})
- Elevation: 879 ft (268 m)

Population (2020)
  - Total: 5,292
  - Density: 1,444.5/sq mi (557.72/km^{2})
- Time zone: UTC-5 (Eastern (EST))
  - Summer (DST): UTC-4 (EDT)
- ZIP code: 49037
- Area code: 269
- FIPS code: 26-75700
- GNIS feature ID: 0638622
- Website: www.springfieldmich.com

Springfield is a city in Calhoun County, Michigan, United States. It is an enclave of the city of Battle Creek. The population was 5,292 at the 2020 census.

== Geography ==
According to the United States Census Bureau, the city has a total area of 3.70 square miles (9.58 km^{2}), of which 3.66 square miles (9.48 km^{2}) is land and 0.04 square miles (0.10 km^{2}) is water.

== Demographics ==
=== Racial and ethnic composition ===
Springfield, Michigan – Racial and ethnic composition Note: the US Census treats Hispanic/Latino as an ethnic category. This table excludes Latinos from the racial categories and assigns them to a separate category. Hispanics/Latinos may be of any race.
Race / Ethnicity (NH = Non-Hispanic)	Pop 2000	Pop 2010	Pop 2020	% 2000	% 2010	% 2020
White alone (NH)	4,428	3,910	3,497	85.33%	74.33%	66.08%
Black or African American alone (NH)	388	495	553	7.48%	9.41%	10.45%
Native American or Alaska Native alone (NH)	48	25	21	0.93%	0.48%	0.40%
Asian alone (NH)	70	391	487	1.35%	7.43%	9.20%
Native Hawaiian or Pacific Islander alone (NH)	0	3	2	0.00%	0.06%	0.04%
Other race alone (NH)	8	2	15	0.15%	0.04%	0.28%
Mixed race or Multiracial (NH)	117	219	394	2.25%	4.16%	7.45%
Hispanic or Latino (any race)	130	215	323	2.51%	4.09%	6.10%
Total	5,189	5,260	5,292	100.00%	100.00%	100.00%

Historical population
Census	Pop.	Note	%±
1960	4,605		—
1970	3,994		−13.3%
1980	5,917		48.1%
1990	5,582		−5.7%
2000	5,189		−7.0%
2010	5,260		1.4%
2020	5,292		0.6%

=== 2020 census ===
As of the 2020 census, Springfield had a population of 5,292. The median age was 35.2 years. 24.6% of residents were under the age of 18 and 13.7% were 65 years of age or older. For every 100 females there were 101.6 males, and for every 100 females age 18 and over there were 102.1 males age 18 and over.

100.0% of residents lived in urban areas, while 0.0% lived in rural areas.

There were 2,218 households, of which 28.6% had children under the age of 18 living in them. Of all households, 31.2% were married-couple households, 28.3% were households with a male householder and no spouse or partner present, and 29.4% were households with a female householder and no spouse or partner present. About 37.3% of all households were made up of individuals, and 12.3% had someone living alone who was 65 years of age or older.

There were 2,466 housing units, of which 10.1% were vacant. The homeowner vacancy rate was 2.5% and the rental vacancy rate was 10.0%.

=== 2010 census ===
As of the census of 2010, there were 5,260 people, 2,156 households, and 1,213 families residing in the city. The population density was 1,437.2 inhabitants per square mile (554.9/km^{2}). There were 2,467 housing units at an average density of 674.0 per square mile (260.2/km^{2}). The racial makeup of the city was 76.6% White, 9.6% African American, 0.5% Native American, 7.5% Asian, 0.1% Pacific Islander, 1.1% from other races, and 4.7% from two or more races. Hispanic or Latino of any race were 4.1% of the population.

There were 2,156 households, of which 32.4% had children under the age of 18 living with them, 33.3% were married couples living together, 15.8% had a female householder with no husband present, 7.2% had a male householder with no wife present, and 43.7% were non-families. 35.4% of all households were made up of individuals, and 8.7% had someone living alone who was 65 years of age or older. The average household size was 2.38 and the average family size was 3.08.

The median age in the city was 33.8 years. 25.2% of residents were under the age of 18; 11.4% were between the ages of 18 and 24; 27.1% were from 25 to 44; 24.5% were from 45 to 64; and 11.7% were 65 years of age or older. The gender makeup of the city was 50.0% male and 50.0% female.

=== 2000 census ===
As of the census of 2000, there were 5,189 people, 2,161 households, and 1,195 families residing in the city. The population density was 1,395.9 inhabitants per square mile (539.0/km^{2}). There were 2,367 housing units at an average density of 636.8 per square mile (245.9/km^{2}). The racial makeup of the city was 86.30% White, 7.69% African American, 0.96% Native American, 1.37% Asian, 0.02% Pacific Islander, 1.08% from other races, and 2.58% from two or more races. Hispanic or Latino of any race were 2.51% of the population.

There were 2,161 households, out of which 26.5% had children under the age of 18 living with them, 35.4% were married couples living together, 13.7% had a female householder with no husband present, and 44.7% were non-families. 36.7% of all households were made up of individuals, and 7.8% had someone living alone who was 65 years of age or older. The average household size was 2.21 and the average family size was 2.89.

In the city, the population was spread out, with 22.4% under the age of 18, 11.3% from 18 to 24, 30.9% from 25 to 44, 20.6% from 45 to 64, and 14.8% who were 65 years of age or older. The median age was 36 years. For every 100 females, there were 103.9 males. For every 100 females age 18 and over, there were 102.3 males.

The median income for a household in the city was $29,790, and the median income for a family was $34,272. Males had a median income of $29,433 versus $22,830 for females. The per capita income for the city was $15,413. About 9.0% of families and 13.0% of the population were below the poverty line, including 11.8% of those under age 18 and 8.7% of those age 65 or over.

== Parks ==
=== Begg Park ===
Springfield's Begg Park is located at 503 Military Avenue just off M-96 and is Springfield's largest park at 20.7 acres (8.4 ha). It is home to a professional 18-hole disk golf course and hosted the 2008 Disc Golf World Championship.{{PDGA World Championships}} In addition to the disc golf course, Begg Park also has the Springfield Farmers' Market, a playground area, a picnic pavilion, open spaces, tree-shaded areas, paved walking trails, and a brook that cuts through the park's center.

=== Upton Park ===
Upton Park is a 6.2-acre park located between Nettles Street and Upton Avenue in Springfield, Michigan. The park features a 1-acre pond used for fishing and model boat racing. In addition, the park has a pavilion used for picnics, playground equipment, a basketball court, and a walking trail that circles the pond. The park is located in the Central and Eastern neighborhoods and is located at the center of one of Springfield's most established neighborhoods. Upton Park is formally known as John F. Kennedy Park.

=== B. Carol Hinton Park ===
The City of Springfield received a grant in 2012 from the Michigan Department of Natural Resources to create a park out of a small piece of city-owned property near the intersection of 27th Street and Frisbie Boulevard. The park has a basketball court and play scape enclosed by a fence.

=== Rothchild Park ===
Rothchild Park is an open park located at Helmer Road and Harmonia Road. It is approximately 12 acres (4.9 ha) and features a pavilion with picnic tables and a dog park.

== Government ==
Springfield has a council-manager form of government. The city levies an income tax of 1 percent on residents and 0.5 percent on nonresidents.
