= Fern Shollenberger =

- Third base
- Born: May 18, 1923; Hamburg, Pennsylvania, U.S.
- Died: December 24, 1977 (aged 54)
- Batted: Right Threw: Right

debut
- 1946, for the Kenosha Comets

Last appearance
- 1954, for the Kalamazoo Lassies

Career statistics
- Batting average: .221
- Runs: 350
- Hits: 725
- Runs batted in: 231
- Stolen bases: 167
- Games played: 918

Teams
- Kenosha Comets (1946–1951); Kalamazoo Lassies (1952–1954)

Career highlights and awards
- Five-time All-Star Team (1950–1954); AAGPBL Championship Team (1954)

Fern Shollenberger [Shelly] (May 18, 1923 – December 24, 1977) was a third basewoman who played from 1946 through 1954 in the All-American Girls Professional Baseball League (AAGPBL). Listed at 5 ft 4 in (1.63 m), 125 lb., she batted and threw right-handed.

== Brief profile ==
Shollenberger was a fine base runner, clever, coaxing batter, and skillful third sacker and hard thrower. She paced the AAGPBL third basewomen in fielding percentage and number of double plays turned from 1949 through 1951, as her .942 career fielding percentage is the highest of any defender at third base in AAGPBL history. She also was selected five times for the All-Star Team.

== Early life ==
A native of Hamburg, Pennsylvania, Shollenberger was the daughter of Alvas Shollenberger, a machinist, and Fannie (née Young) Shollenberger. She grew up with three brothers and one sister. One of her brothers, Kenneth, recalled that sporting activity was hugely popular in the household. In her early years, she often played basketball and baseball with her brothers. She idolized Babe Ruth and always dreamed of playing baseball someday; dreamed of the sound of the ball smacking an oiled mitt, the crack of a bat, the fans cheers. At Hamburg High School, she participated energetically in every available sport and starred both in basketball and baseball.

== AAGPBL career ==
An AAGPBL scout signed Shollenberger after seeing her play in an amateur softball league in Hamburg. She entered the league in 1946 with the Kenosha Comets, playing for them five years before joining the Kalamazoo Lassies (1952-'54). While the Comets were invariably low in the standings, their fielding was always among the best in the league, and Shollenberger was one of the key reasons. In her rookie season, she posted a .225 batting average with 35 runs, 24 runs batted in, and 35 stolen bases in 94 games. Between 1947 and 1949 she dropped to .165, .210 and .178 respectively, but rebounded in 1950 with a .254 average, 106 hits and 48 runs –all career-numbers–, earning the first of her five consecutive All-Star selections. In 1951 she matched her average and runs scored numbers, while driving in 21 runs.

After the Comets folded in 1951 Shollenberger moved on to play with the Lassies, to stabilize an infield that included June Peppas (1B), Nancy Mudge (2B) and Dorothy Schroeder (SS). Her most productive season came in 1954, when she posted career-highs in average (.268), home runs (8) and RBI (58). She also earned her fifth All-Star selection and was a member of the Kalamazoo Lassies Champion team, during what turned out to be the AAGPBL final season. She formed part of some Lassies rallies in the final Series against the Fort Wayne Daisies, which included a towering home run off Maxine Kline in Game One.

In 1977, Shollenberger and her father Alvas were killed in a motor vehicle collision.

== Sources ==
- Biographical Dictionary of American Sports: Q-Z – David L. Porter. Publisher: Greenwood Publishing Group, 2000. Format: Hardcover, 672pp. Language: English. ISBN 978-0-313-31176-5
- Encyclopedia of women and baseball' – Leslie A. Heaphy, Mel Anthony May. Publisher: McFarland & Company, 2006. Format: Paperback, 438pp. Language: English. ISBN 978-0-7864-2100-8
