= Carol Habben =

- Center fielder / Utility
- Born: May 15, 1933; Midland Park, New Jersey, U.S.
- Died: January 11, 1997 (aged 63); Ridgewood, New Jersey, U.S.
- Batted: Right Threw: Right

Career statistics
- Batting average: .231
- Home runs: 15
- Runs batted in: 65

Teams
- Rockford Peaches (1951–1953); Kalamazoo Lassies (1954)

Career highlights and awards
- AAGPBL Champion Team (1954)

Carol Habben (May 15, 1933 – January 11, 1997) was a center fielder and backup catcher who played from 1951 through 1954 in the All-American Girls Professional Baseball League (AAGPBL). Listed at 5 ft 5 in (1.65 m), 135 lb., she batted and threw right-handed.

== Early life ==
Born in Midland Park, New Jersey, Carol Habben began playing ball on sandlots in Rahway at age 12 and joined the Flashettes of Garfield two years later. In the process, Habben played baseball at Pompton Lakes High School. At age 17, she attended an AAGPBL tryout and signed a contract for $250 a month to play in the league. While still in high school, she had to take her exams early in order to make it for the start of the 1951 season.

== AAGPBL career ==
Habben played for the Rockford Peaches. During the final season of the AAGPBL, she was a hitter for the team.

In 1951, Habben went 1-for-26 for a batting average of .038 as a rookie, and saw limited action the next season. In 1953, she hit .194 with a .238 on-base percentage in a utility role, playing in the outfield, catching, and also pitching in case of an emergency. Then she was dealt by Rockford to the Kalamazoo Lassies before the 1954 season.

Habben showed how much power she had in her bat when the AAGPBL's ball was switched to 9 ¼ inches—the same size used in the Major Leagues.

As an everyday center fielder in 1954, Habben hit a .276 average with a .363 OBP in 98 games, while slugging for a .445 average to become the second half of the so-called Home Run Twins, as she hit 15 home runs and Chris Ballingall belted 17 to power the Lassies to the Championship Title.

== Life after baseball ==
After the AAGPBL folded, Habben returned to New Jersey, competing in ASA fast-pitch softball in Linden until 1973, and also umpiring in men's and women's leagues.

Habben lived in Ringwood and worked 37 years for Merck & Co. as a credit manager until her retirement in 1994. She is part of the AAGPBL permanent display at the Baseball Hall of Fame and Museum at Cooperstown, New York, opened in 1988, which is dedicated to the entire league rather than any individual player.

Habben spent the last days of her life in Ridgewood, New Jersey, where she died of a long illness at the age of 63.
