= Chris Ballingall =

American baseball player (1932–2025)

- Catcher
- Born: May 17, 1932; Ann Arbor, Michigan, U.S.
- Died: May 11, 2025 (aged 92); Texas Township, Michigan, U.S.
- Batted: Left Threw: Right

AAGPBL debut
- 1953, for the Muskegon Belles

Last AAGPBL appearance
- 1954, for the Kalamazoo Lassies

Teams
- Muskegon Belles (1953); Kalamazoo Lassies (1953–1954)

Career highlights and awards
- AAGPBL Championship (1954)

Christina Ballingall (May 17, 1932 – May 11, 2025) was an American professional baseball catcher who played in the All-American Girls Professional Baseball League (AAGPBL) in 1953 and 1954. Listed at 5 feet 6 inches (1.68 m) and 145 pounds (66 kg), she batted left-handed and threw right-handed.

A native of Ann Arbor, Michigan, Ballingall learned to play baseball while catching for her twin brother. She had originally been offered a contract at the age of 15 to play in the AAGPBL, but her father did not want her to play then. She had to wait six years before being signed in 1953. She entered the league with the Muskegon Belles, and was traded to the Kalamazoo Lassies during the midseason. She also appeared in a few games at first base and outfield.

In 1954, Ballingall posted a .242 batting average with 17 home runs and 40 runs batted in in 90 games. In the playoffs, she hit .444 with eight RBI and two home runs, including one grand slam, to help the Lassies clinch the AAGPBL last championship title. She and her teammate Carol Habben, who hit a total of 16 homers (one in postseason), were dubbed the "Home Run Twins" by terrorizing opponents with their bats all the way through the lineup.

Ballingall died on May 11, 2025, at the age of 92. She had been living in Mattawan, Michigan, until the time of her death.

== Statistics ==
=== Regular season ===
Batting

GP	AB	R	H	2B	3B	HR	RBI	SB	BB	SO	BA	OBP	SLG
162	473	68	103	9	1	18	53	4	83	108	.218	.335	.414

Fielding

GP	PO	A	E	TC	DP	FA
167	454	25	26	505	13	.949

=== Postseason ===
Batting

GP	AB	R	H	2B	3B	HR	RBI	SB	BA	SLG
8	32	7	13	1	0	2	6	0	.444	.625

Fielding

GP	PO	A	E	TC	FA
8	9	4	0	13	1.000

== Sources ==
- Encyclopedia of women and baseball - Leslie A. Heaphy, Mel Anthony May. Publisher: McFarland & Co., 2006. Format: Paperback, 438 pp. Language: English. ISBN 0-7864-2100-2
- The Women of the All-American Girls Professional Baseball League: A biographical dictionary - W. C. Madden. Publisher: McFarland & Co., 1997. Format: Paperback, 295 pp. Language: English. ISBN 0-7864-0304-7
