= List of All-American Girls Professional Baseball League players (D–G) =

The following is a list of All-American Girls Professional Baseball League players who formed part of the circuit during its twelve years of existence.

== See also ==
- List of All-American Girls Professional Baseball League players (A–C)
- List of All-American Girls Professional Baseball League players (H–L)
- List of All-American Girls Professional Baseball League players (M–R)
- List of All-American Girls Professional Baseball League players (S–Z)

== D ==
Name	Position(s)	Year(s)	Team(s)	Ref
Sarah Mavis Dabbs	outfield	1947	Fort Wayne Daisies	
Louella Daetweiler	catcher	1944	Rockford Peaches	
Mary Dailey	outfield, pitcher	1950–1951	Peoria Redwings, South Bend Blue Sox, Battle Creek Belles	
Dorothy Damaschke	outfield	1945	Racine Belles	
Faye Dancer	center field, first base, pitcher	1944–1948, 1950	Minneapolis Millerettes, Fort Wayne Daisies, Peoria Redwings	
Josephine D'Angelo	outfield	1943–1944	South Bend Blue Sox	
Margaret Danhauser	first base	1943–1949	Racine Belles	
Shirley Danz	outfield	1950	Chicago Colleens, Racine Belles	
Eleanor Dapkus	outfield, pitcher	1943–1950	Racine Belles	
Barbara Anne Davis	n/a	1949	Racine Belles, Rockford Peaches	
Gladys Davis	infield, outfield	1943–1944, 1946	Rockford Peaches, Milwaukee Chicks, Muskegon Lassies	
Alice DeCambra	infield, pitcher	1947	Fort Wayne Daisies, Peoria Redwings, Kalamazoo Lassies	
Lillian DeCambra	infield utility	1947	Fort Wayne Daisies	
Mildred Deegan	outfield, second base, pitcher	1943–1952	Rockford Peaches, Kenosha Comets, Springfield Sallies, Fort Wayne Daisies, Peoria Redwings	
Audrey Deemer	pitcher, infield utility	1950	Chicago Colleens, Fort Wayne Daisies, Springfield Sallies	
Betty Degner	pitcher	1949	Muskegon Lassies, Springfield Sallies	
Irene DeLaby	pitcher	1949	Racine Belles	
Miss DeMarco	n/a	1954	Kalamazoo Lassies	
Pauline Dennert	left field	1947	Muskegon Lassies	
Jerre DeNoble	outfield	1947	Peoria Redwings	
Mona Denton	pitcher	1946–1947	South Bend Blue Sox, Kenosha Comets	
Jeanie Descombes	pitcher	1953–1954	Grand Rapids Chicks	
Nancy DeShone	outfield	1948	South Bend Blue Sox	
Wanita Dokish	third base, outfield	1954	Rockford Peaches	
Terry Donahue	catcher	1946–1949	Peoria Redwings	
Miss Dougal	n/a	1953	Muskegon Belles	
Dorothea Downs	first base, right field	1945	South Bend Blue Sox	
Cartha Doyle	second base	1947	Rockford Peaches	
Maxine Drinkwater	first base, second base	1954	South Bend Blue Sox	
Gertrude Dunn	shortstop	1951–1954	Battle Creek Belles, South Bend Blue Sox	
Julie Dusanko *	third base, outfield	1944	Racine Belles, Minneapolis Millerettes	
Beverly Dustrude	second base	1947, 1949	Rockford Peaches, Springfield Sallies	
Loretta Dwojak	outfield, third base	1944	Minneapolis Millerettes, South Bend Blue Sox	

* Dusanko played under her maiden name of Julie Sabo.

== E ==
Name	Position(s)	Year(s)	Team(s)	Ref
Mildred Earp	pitcher	1947–1950	Grand Rapids Chicks	
Geraldine Edwards	infield/outfield utility	1951	Kenosha Comets	
Thelma Eisen	outfield	1944–1952	Milwaukee Chicks, Grand Rapids Chicks, Peoria Redwings, Fort Wayne Daisies	
June Emerson	right field, first base	1948–1949	Springfield Sallies, Peoria Redwings	
Elizabeth Emry	shortstop, pitcher	1945–1946	Racine Belles	
Madeline English	second base	1943–1950	Racine Belles	
Louise Erickson	pitcher	1948–1950	Racine Belles, Rockford Peaches	
Esther Ewald	n/a	1953	n/a	

== F ==
Name	Position(s)	Year(s)	Team(s)	Ref
Elizabeth Fabac	second base	1945–1948	Kenosha Comets	
Lillian Faralla	pitcher, second base, center field	1946–1951	Peoria Redwings, Fort Wayne Daisies, South Bend Blue Sox, Kalamazoo Lassies	
Elizabeth Farrow	pitcher	1944	Minneapolis Millerettes, Rockford Peaches	
Jean Faut	pitcher, third base, outfield	1946–1953	South Bend Blue Sox	
Peggy Fenton	infield utility	1948	Muskegon Lassies, South Bend Blue Sox	
Dorothy Ferguson *	second base, third base, outfield	1945–1954	Rockford Peaches, Peoria Redwings	
Fern Ferguson	pitcher	1945	Racine Belles	
Josephine Figlo	outfielder	1944	Racine Belles, Milwaukee Chicks	
Helen Filarski	second base, third base, outfield	1945–1950	Rockford Peaches, Kenosha Comets, Peoria Redwings, South Bend Blue Sox	
Alva Jo Fischer	pitcher, shortstop	1945–1949	Rockford Peaches, Muskegon Lassies	
Lorraine Fisher	pitcher, outfield	1947–1949	Rockford Peaches, Grand Rapids Chicks	
Meryle Fitzgerald	pitcher	1946	Fort Wayne Daisies	
Mary Flaherty	pitcher, third base	1948–1949	Racine Belles, Peoria Redwings	
Lois Florreich	outfield, third base, pitcher	1943; 1946–1950	South Bend Blue Sox, Kenosha Comets, Rockford Peaches	
Rose Folder	pitcher, outfield	1944	Kenosha Comets	
Anita Foss	second base, pitcher	1948–1949	Springfield Sallies, Muskegon Lassies, Grand Rapids Chicks, Rockford Peaches	
Betty Foss	third base, first base, outfield	1950–1954	Fort Wayne Daisies	
Betty Fountain	n/a	1949	Springfield Sallies	
Betty Francis	outfield	1949–1954	Chicago Colleens, Muskegon Lassies, Kalamazoo Lassies, South Bend Blue Sox	
Edna Frank	catcher	1944	Minneapolis Millerettes, Racine Belles	
Hermina Franks	pitcher	1946	Kenosha Comets	
Peggy Friend	n/a	1949	n/a	
Betty Jane Fritz	outfield	1943	Rockford Peaches	
Mary Froning	center field, pitcher	1951–1954	South Bend Blue Sox, Battle Creek Belles	

* Ferguson also played under her married name of Dorothy Key.

== G ==
Name	Position(s)	Year(s)	Team(s)	Ref
Rose Gacioch	pitcher, infield/outfield utility	1951	South Bend Blue Sox, Rockford Peaches, Grand Rapids Chicks	
Barbara Galdonik	third base	1950–1951	Kenosha Comets, Battle Creek Belles	
Luisa Gallegos	pitcher, third base	1949	Peoria Redwings, South Bend Blue Sox	
Gertrude Ganote	first base, pitcher	1944–1945	Kenosha Comets, South Bend Blue Sox	
Ann Garman	first base	1953	South Bend Blue Sox	
Eileen Gascon	third base, center field	1949; 1951	Springfield Sallies, Grand Rapids Chicks, Battle Creek Belles, Peoria Redwings	
Barbara Gates	pitcher	1953–1954	Grand Rapids Chicks, South Bend Blue Sox, Fort Wayne Daisies	
Jean Geissinger	infield/outfield utility, pitcher	1951–1954	Fort Wayne Daisies, Grand Rapids Chicks	
Genevieve George	catcher	1948	Muskegon Lassies	
Beulah Anne Georges	pitcher, infield	1948–1949	Chicago Colleens, Fort Wayne Daisies, Springfield Sallies	
Betty Gernert	n/a	1951	Fort Wayne Daisies	
Philomena Gianfrancisco	outfield	1945–1948	Grand Rapids Chicks, Racine Belles	
Jeanne Gilchrist	catcher	1946	Peoria Redwings	
June Gilmore	outfield	1944	Rockford Peaches	
Rose Mary Glaser	outfield utility, catcher	1944	Kenosha Comets	
Thelma Golden	pitcher	1943	Rockford Peaches	
Bethany Goldsmith	pitcher	1948–1950	Kenosha Comets	
Annie Gosbee	second base, shortstop	1953–1954	Grand Rapids Chicks, Rockford Peaches	
Mary Lou Graham	pitcher	1953	South Bend Blue Sox	
Thelma Grambo	catcher	1946	Grand Rapids Chicks	
Olga Grant	outfield	1944	Milwaukee Chicks	
Dorothy Green	catcher	1943–1947; 1949–1950	Rockford Peaches	
Miss Gregory	n/a	1946	n/a	
Betty Gruno	n/a	1946	n/a	
Geraldine Guest	outfield	1951	Peoria Redwings	
Julie Gutz	catcher	1948–1950	Springfield Sallies, Muskegon Lassies, Kenosha Comets	
