= Beulah Anne Georges =

American baseball player

- Pitcher/Utility Player
- Born: May 10, 1923; Toledo, Ohio, U.S.
- Died: January 4, 2005 (aged 81); Park Ridge, Illinois, U.S.
- Batted: Right Threw: Right

Teams
- Chicago Colleens (1948); Fort Wayne Daisies (1948); Springfield Sallies (1949)

Career highlights and awards
- Women in Baseball – AAGPBL Permanent Display at Baseball Hall of Fame and Museum (1988)

Beulah Anne Georges (May 10, 1923 – January 4, 2005), also known as Anne Georges and Scoop Georges, was a member of three women’s American professional baseball teams in the 1940s.

== Background ==
Georges was born in Toledo, Ohio but raised in Columbus. She died in Park Ridge, Illinois in 2005, aged 81.

== Baseball ==
Georges played as a pitcher, infielder and utility for the Chicago Colleens and the Fort Wayne Daisies in 1948 and with the Springfield Sallies in 1949.

== Springfield Sallies ==
Georges played on the Springfield Sallies team in 1949 along with Eileen Gascon, Doris Cook, Migdalia "Mickey" Pérez, Lillian Shadic, Mirtha Marrero, Renae Youngberg, Mary "Wimp" Baumgartner, Sue Kidd, Kay Lionikas, Gertrude "Gert" Alderfer, Barbara Payne, Barbara Liebrich, Betty Degner, Norene Arnold and Jane Moffet. These women were part of the league's idea to recruit new players by sending out rookie teams to play against each other. The Springfield Sallies and the Chicago Colleens made up one of the tours. The tour was successful enough in 1949 that it was repeated in 1950.
