= DeCambra =

DeCambra is a surname. Notable people with the surname include:

- Alice DeCambra (1921–1988), American baseball player
- Lillian DeCambra (1925–2003), American baseball player

== See also ==
- Cambra (disambiguation)
