= Joanne McComb =

American baseball player (1933–2023)

Joanne McComb (March 1, 1933 – June 21, 2023) was an American player in the All-American Girls Professional Baseball League (AAGPBL). She was nicknamed "Jo" by her teammates, and both threw and batted right-handed.

== Background ==
Joanne McComb was born in Avonmore, Pennsylvania on March 1, 1933. Her father taught her to play baseball. McComb recalled being a young girl and playing ball on the street with the boys. She explained that: “a neighbor came up to my mother and said, ‘Why does your daughter act like that? Why can’t she be more ladylike?’ My mother never said a word.” One of her most significant influences was growing up on a street where all her neighbors enjoyed playing baseball. Every single day, they played a game of baseball in the middle of their street. People from all over town came to watch it. She was self-confident because of her place the baseball league.

== Professional career ==
McComb first heard about the league from an article she read in the Pittsburgh Post-Gazette. In that article the try-outs were mentioned.

McComb played in first base for the Springfield Sallies in 1950. This was her favorite position. Her favorite manager was Mitch Skupien and her favorite chaperone was Barbara Liebrich (whose nickname was Bobbie).

McComb's most memorable baseball-related experience was playing in a Yankee Stadium before a Yankee versus Philadelphia A’s game.

McComb earned degrees from Slippery Rock University and Penn State and served as a women's basketball coach and administrator at Bloomsburg University of Pennsylvania.

== Death ==
Joanne McComb died on June 21, 2023, at the age of 90.

== Career statistics ==
Seasonal Batting record

Year	G	AB	R	H	2B	3B	HR	RBI	SB	BB	SO	AVG
1950	69	242	32	34	1	0	0	19	9	37	43	.140
