= Barbara Berger =

All-American Girls Professional Baseball League player

- Catcher
- Born: December 6, 1930; Maywood, Illinois, U.S.
- Died: January 27, 2016 (aged 85); Maywood, Illinois, U.S.
- Batted: Right Threw: Right

Teams
- Chicago Colleens (1949); Racine Belles (1950)

Career highlights and awards
- Women in Baseball – AAGPBL Permanent Display at Baseball Hall of Fame and Museum (since 1988)

Barbara Berger (December 6, 1930 – January 27, 2016) was an American baseball catcher who played in the All-American Girls Professional Baseball League (AAGPBL). Listed at 5' 2", 120 lb., she batted and threw right handed.

Born in Maywood, Illinois, Berger and her younger sister, Norma, played baseball and basketball together during their childhood and later played softball in grade school.

Berger entered the league in 1949 with the Chicago Colleens, a rookie touring team which played exhibition games against the Springfield Sallies as they travelled primarily through the South and East. The next season she was promoted to the Racine Belles, where she was used sparingly as a backup catcher. She hit a .176 average in 11 games. The same season, Norma Berger joined the league as a pitcher for the Sallies.

She left the league in 1951 to attend University of Illinois, where she earned bachelor's and master's degrees and taught at her alma mater for 19 years. She married George Brown in 1969, and lived in Murray, Kentucky.

In 1988, the Berger sisters received further recognition when they became part of Women in Baseball, a permanent display based at the Baseball Hall of Fame and Museum in Cooperstown, New York which was unveiled to honor the entire All-American Girls Professional Baseball League.

== Career statistics ==
Batting

GP	AB	R	H	2B	3B	HR	RBI	SB	TB	BB	SO	BA	OBP	SLG
11	17	2	3	0	0	0	1	1	3	1	3	.176	.222	.176

Fielding

GP	PO	A	E	TC	DP	FA
10	18	2	5	25	0	.800
