= Doon, Iowa =

- City
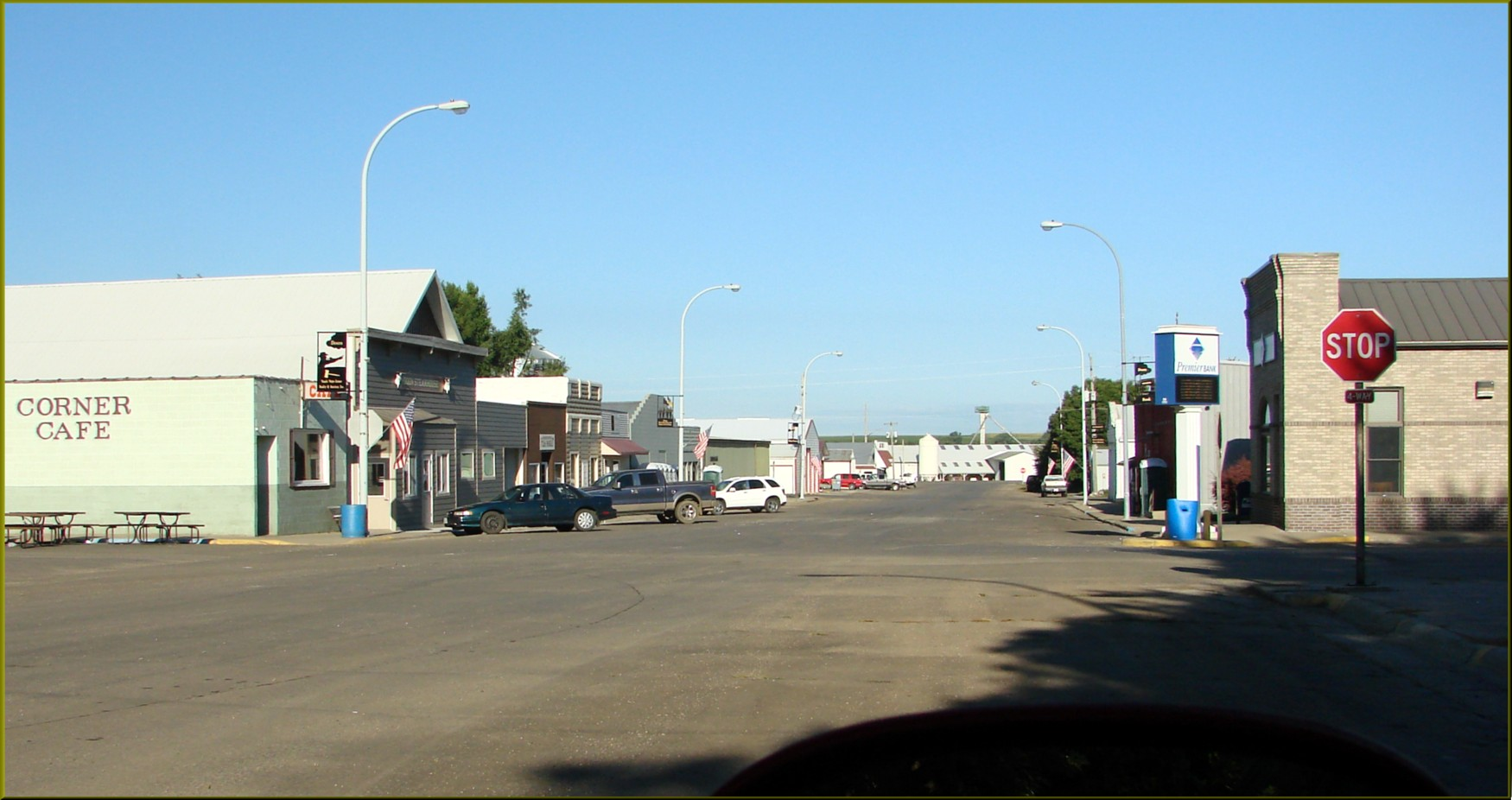
- Main Street of Doon, Iowa in 2013

- Logo

- Location of Doon, Iowa
- Coordinates: 43°16′45″N 96°13′59″W
- Country: USA
- State: Iowa
- County: Lyon
- Township: Doon
- Settled: 1869
- Incorporated: March 8, 1892

Government
  - Type: Mayor-council

Area
  - Total: 0.70 sq mi (1.82 km^{2})
  - Land: 0.70 sq mi (1.82 km^{2})
  - Water: 0 sq mi (0.00 km^{2})
- Elevation: 1,296 ft (395 m)

Population (2020)
  - Total: 619
  - Density: 882.1/sq mi (340.59/km^{2})
- Time zone: UTC-6 (Central (CST))
  - Summer (DST): UTC-5 (CDT)
- ZIP code: 51235
- Area code: 712
- FIPS code: 19-21900
- GNIS feature ID: 2394548
- Website: www.cityofdoon.com

Doon is a city in Doon Township, Lyon County, Iowa, United States, along the Rock River. The population was 619 at the time of the 2020 census. The BNSF Railway passes through Doon.

== History ==
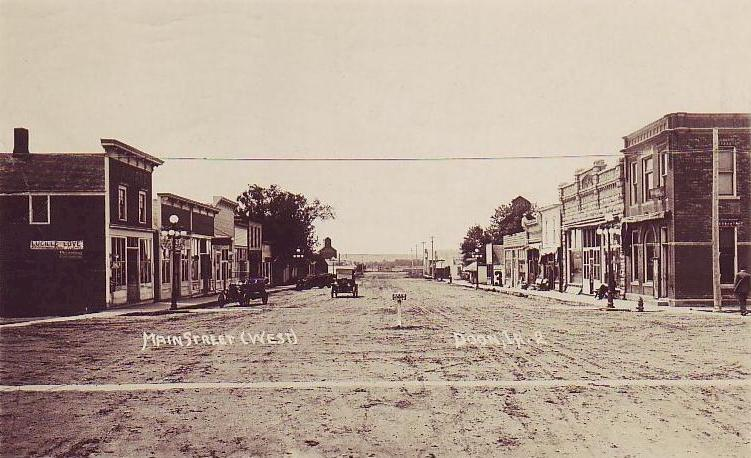
Main Street in 1922

Located on a plateau on the eastern bank of the Rock River, the city was named after the River Doon in Scotland, made famous as the subject of Robert Burns' poem, "The Banks O' Doon". Doon was first settled in 1869 by a small group of settlers. Founded by G. W. Bowers and A. H. Davison on September 6, 1889, the railway town was connected first by the Rock Valley Railway, followed by the Iowa & Dakota Railroad. The city was incorporated on March 8, 1892.

== Geography ==
According to the United States Census Bureau, the city has a total area of 0.57 square miles (1.48 km^{2}), all land.

The Rock River, a tributary of the Big Sioux River, flows past the north and west sides of the town and the Little Rock River flows past to the south to join The Rock just southwest of the community.

The city is served by U.S. Route 75, three miles east of Doon, connected by Iowa Highway 167. The Burlington Northern passes the west side of the community.

== Demographics ==
Historical populations
Year	Pop.	±%
1900	545	—
1910	581	+6.6%
1920	576	−0.9%
1930	576	+0.0%
1940	576	+0.0%
1950	517	−10.2%
1960	436	−15.7%
1970	437	+0.2%
1980	537	+22.9%
1990	476	−11.4%
2000	533	+12.0%
2010	577	+8.3%
2020	619	+7.3%
Source:"U.S. Census website". United States Census Bureau. and Iowa Data Center; Source: U.S. Decennial Census

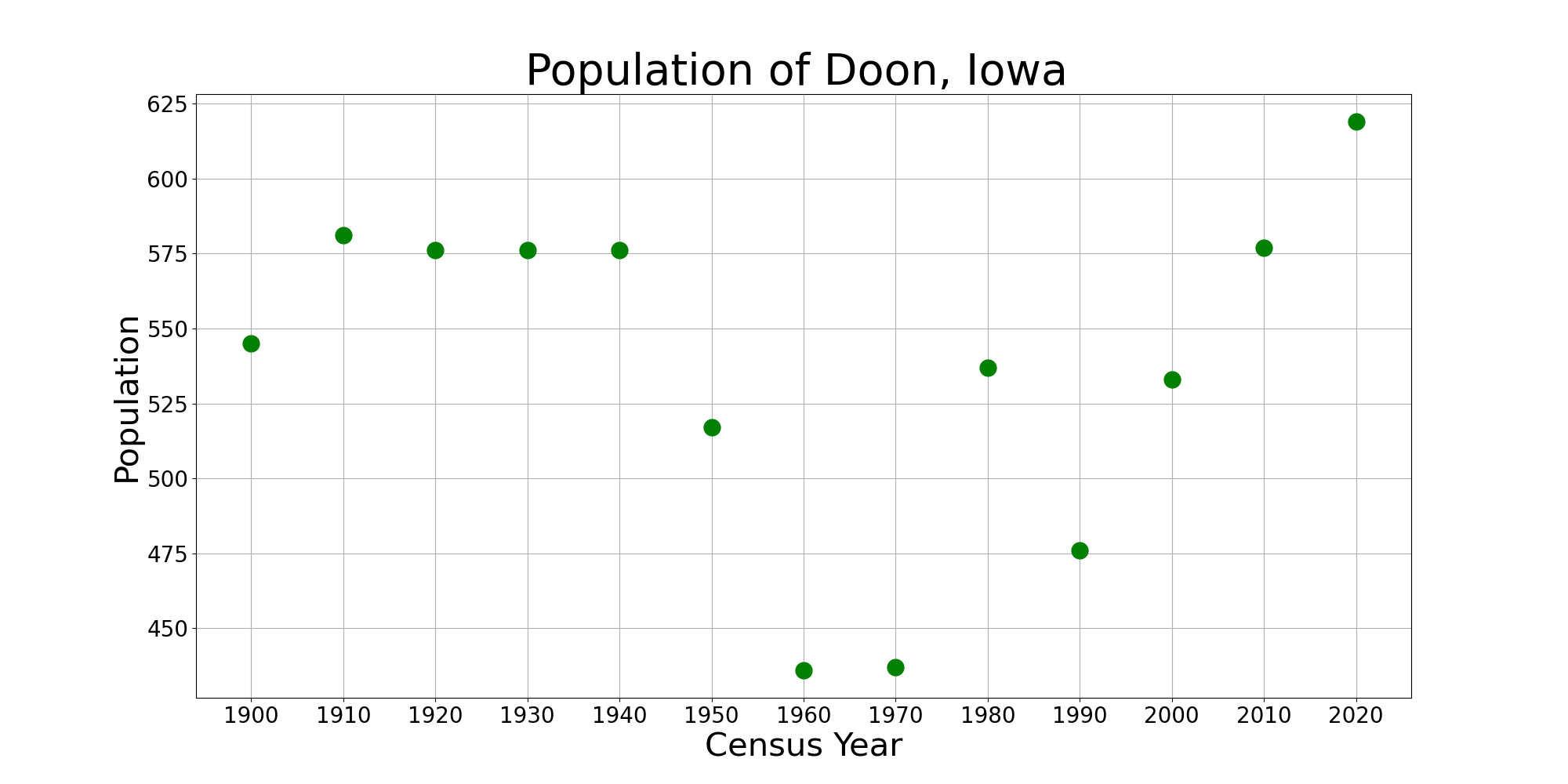
The population of Doon, Iowa from US census data

=== 2020 census ===
As of the census of 2020, there were 619 people, 245 households, and 165 families residing in the city. The population density was 882.1 inhabitants per square mile (340.6/km^{2}). There were 247 housing units at an average density of 352.0 per square mile (135.9/km^{2}). The racial makeup of the city was 96.6% White, 0.5% Black or African American, 0.0% Native American, 0.0% Asian, 0.0% Pacific Islander, 1.1% from other races and 1.8% from two or more races. Hispanic or Latino persons of any race comprised 2.9% of the population.

Of the 245 households, 35.5% of which had children under the age of 18 living with them, 57.1% were married couples living together, 2.4% were cohabitating couples, 18.4% had a female householder with no spouse or partner present and 22.0% had a male householder with no spouse or partner present. 32.7% of all households were non-families. 30.6% of all households were made up of individuals, 12.2% had someone living alone who was 65 years old or older.

The median age in the city was 32.3 years. 33.3% of the residents were under the age of 20; 6.6% were between the ages of 20 and 24; 25.0% were from 25 and 44; 21.3% were from 45 and 64; and 13.7% were 65 years of age or older. The gender makeup of the city was 53.6% male and 46.4% female.

=== 2010 census ===
As of the census of 2010, there were 577 people, 214 households, and 150 families living in the city. The population density was 1,012.3 inhabitants per square mile (390.9/km^{2}). There were 224 housing units at an average density of 393.0 per square mile (151.7/km^{2}). The racial makeup of the city was 98.6% White, 1.2% from other races, and 0.2% from two or more races. Hispanic or Latino of any race were 2.4% of the population.

There were 214 households, of which 36.0% had children under the age of 18 living with them, 66.8% were married couples living together, 1.9% had a female householder with no husband present, 1.4% had a male householder with no wife present, and 29.9% were non-families. 26.6% of all households were made up of individuals, and 14.4% had someone living alone who was 65 years of age or older. The average household size was 2.70 and the average family size was 3.33.

The median age in the city was 32.5 years. 30.8% of residents were under the age of 18; 9.2% were between the ages of 18 and 24; 24.3% were from 25 to 44; 20.2% were from 45 to 64; and 15.4% were 65 years of age or older. The gender makeup of the city was 54.6% male and 45.4% female.

=== 2000 census ===
As of the census of 2000, there were 533 people, 202 households, and 151 families living in the city. The population density was 924.1 inhabitants per square mile (356.8/km^{2}). There were 217 housing units at an average density of 376.2 per square mile (145.3/km^{2}). The racial makeup of the city was 99.81% White and 0.19% Native American. Hispanic or Latino of any race were 0.38% of the population.

There were 202 households, out of which 38.1% had children under the age of 18 living with them, 69.8% were married couples living together, 4.5% had a female householder with no husband present, and 24.8% were non-families. 22.8% of all households were made up of individuals, and 9.9% had someone living alone who was 65 years of age or older. The average household size was 2.64 and the average family size was 3.13.

In the city, the population was spread out, with 30.0% under the age of 18, 9.0% from 18 to 24, 27.0% from 25 to 44, 18.6% from 45 to 64, and 15.4% who were 65 years of age or older. The median age was 32 years. For every 100 females, there were 116.7 males. For every 100 females age 18 and over, there were 100.5 males.

The median income for a household in the city was $33,281, and the median income for a family was $39,773. Males had a median income of $26,607 versus $19,286 for females. The per capita income for the city was $14,698. About 6.4% of families and 7.0% of the population were below the poverty line, including 5.9% of those under age 18 and 12.1% of those age 65 or over.

== Education ==
Doon is served by the Central Lyon Community School District.

== Notable people ==
- Jean Ray Laury, artist
- Frederick Manfred, author
