= Norma Berger =

American baseball player (1932–2023)

- Pitcher
- Born: December 22, 1932; Maywood, Illinois, U.S.
- Died: November 1, 2023 (aged 90); Oak Brook, Illinois, U.S.
- Batted: Right Threw: Right

Teams
- Springfield Sallies (1950)

Career highlights and awards
- Women in Baseball – AAGPBL Permanent Display at Baseball Hall of Fame and Museum (since 1988)

Norma A. Berger Taylor (December 22, 1932 – November 1, 2023) was an American baseball pitcher who played in the All-American Girls Professional Baseball League (AAGPBL) during the 1950 season. Berger was nicknamed "Bergie״. Listed at 5 ft 3 in (1.60 m), 140 lb (64 kg), she batted and threw right-handed.

== Biography ==
Born in Maywood, Illinois, Norma Berger followed in the footsteps of Barbara Berger, her older sister, a catcher who played in parts of two seasons.

The Berger sisters played baseball and basketball together during their childhood years, like the sisters depicted in the Penny Marshall 1992 film A League of Their Own, though Margaret and Norma never competed against each other in the All-American Girls Professional Baseball League.

Berger spent the 1950 season with the Springfield Sallies, a touring player development team managed by Mitch Skupien. She posted an 8–8 record in 18 pitching appearances. As a hitter, she collected a .118 average (6-for-51), driving in four runs while scoring six times.

After the season came to an end, Berger attended college and married Robert Taylor in 1955. The couple fostered two children, Bonnie and Vickie. Her husband retired in 1994, but she continued to work as a bank supervisor.

In 1988, the Berger sisters received recognition when the Baseball Hall of Fame and Museum in Cooperstown, New York, dedicated a permanent display to the entire league rather than any individual player.

Norma Berger Taylor lived in Villa Park, Illinois. She died in Oak Brook, Illinois, on November 1, 2023, at the age of 90.
