= Alvord, Iowa =

- City
- Location of Alvord, Iowa
- Coordinates: 43°20′30″N 96°18′13″W
- Country: USA
- State: Iowa
- County: Lyon
- Township: Doon
- Incorporated: September 26, 1892

Government
  - Type: Mayor-council

Area
  - Total: 0.58 sq mi (1.50 km^{2})
  - Land: 0.58 sq mi (1.50 km^{2})
  - Water: 0 sq mi (0.00 km^{2})
- Elevation: 1,329 ft (405 m)

Population (2020)
  - Total: 206
  - Density: 356.7/sq mi (137.73/km^{2})
- Time zone: UTC-6 (Central (CST))
  - Summer (DST): UTC-5 (CDT)
- ZIP code: 51230
- Area code: 712
- FIPS code: 19-01675
- GNIS feature ID: 2393943
- Website: cityofalvordiowa.com

Alvord is a city in Doon Township, Lyon County, Iowa, United States. The population was 206 at the 2020 census.

== History ==
Alvord was incorporated as a city on September 26, 1892.

== Geography ==
According to the United States Census Bureau, the city has a total area of 0.28 square miles (0.73 km^{2}), all land.

== Demographics ==
Historical populations
Year	Pop.	±%
1900	249	—
1910	283	+13.7%
1920	359	+26.9%
1930	313	−12.8%
1940	306	−2.2%
1950	263	−14.1%
1960	238	−9.5%
1970	204	−14.3%
1980	246	+20.6%
1990	204	−17.1%
2000	187	−8.3%
2010	196	+4.8%
2020	206	+5.1%
Source:"U.S. Census website". United States Census Bureau. and Iowa Data Center; Source: U.S. Decennial Census

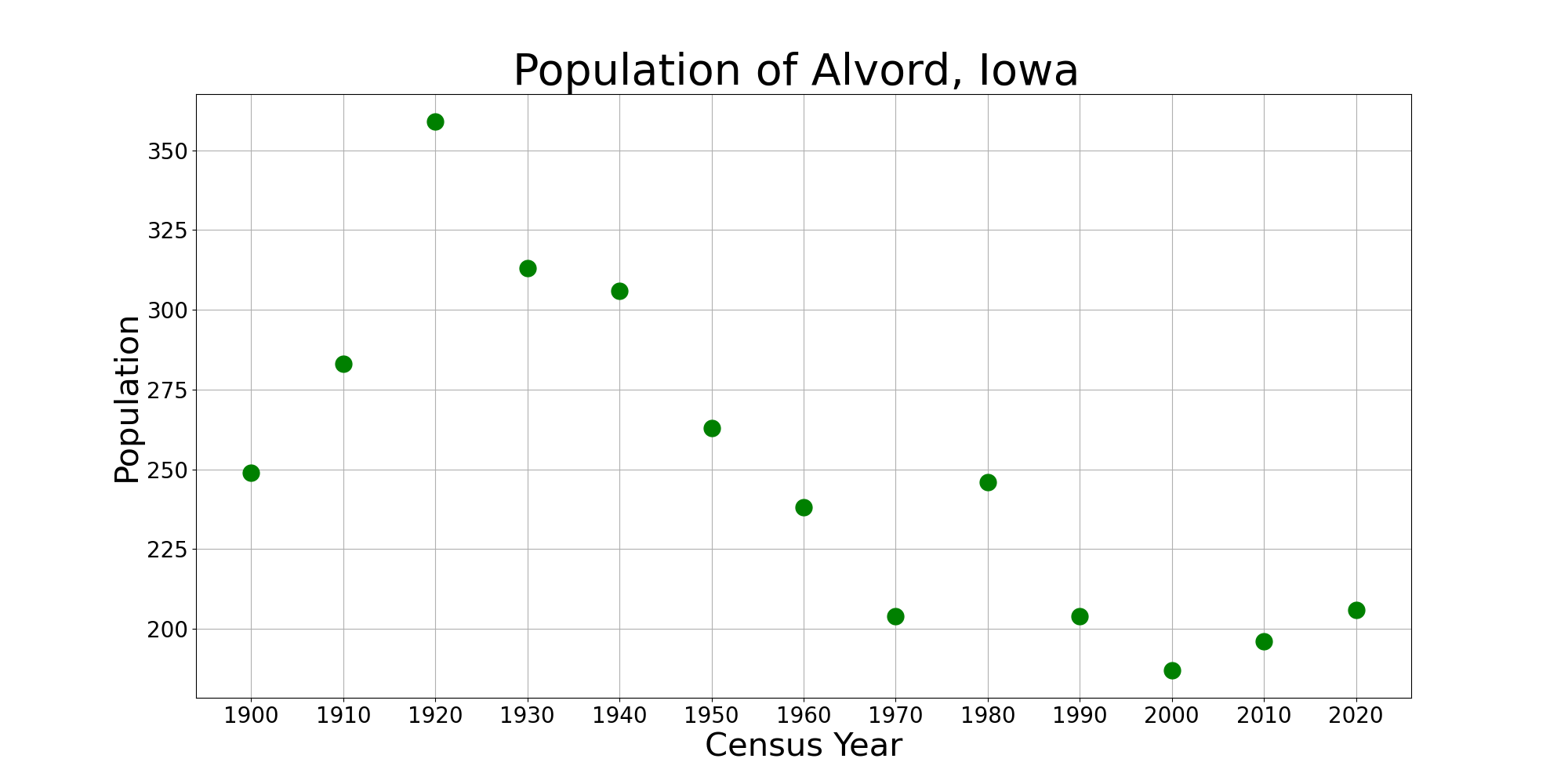
The population of Alvord, Iowa from US census data

=== 2020 census ===
As of the census of 2020, there were 206 people, 80 households, and 61 families residing in the city. The population density was 356.7 inhabitants per square mile (137.7/km^{2}). There were 88 housing units at an average density of 152.4 per square mile (58.8/km^{2}). The racial makeup of the city was 88.8% White, 1.0% Black or African American, 0.5% Native American, 1.0% Asian, 0.0% Pacific Islander, 2.9% from other races and 5.8% from two or more races. Hispanic or Latino persons of any race comprised 8.7% of the population.

Of the 80 households, 42.5% of which had children under the age of 18 living with them, 61.2% were married couples living together, 6.2% were cohabitating couples, 15.0% had a female householder with no spouse or partner present and 17.5% had a male householder with no spouse or partner present. 23.8% of all households were non-families. 17.5% of all households were made up of individuals, 8.8% had someone living alone who was 65 years old or older.

The median age in the city was 35.0 years. 33.0% of the residents were under the age of 20; 3.4% were between the ages of 20 and 24; 25.7% were from 25 and 44; 18.4% were from 45 and 64; and 19.4% were 65 years of age or older. The gender makeup of the city was 50.0% male and 50.0% female.

=== 2010 census ===
As of the census of 2010, there were 196 people, 79 households, and 54 families living in the city. The population density was 700.0 inhabitants per square mile (270.3/km^{2}). There were 85 housing units at an average density of 303.6 per square mile (117.2/km^{2}). The racial makeup of the city was 89.8% White, 8.2% from other races, and 2.0% from two or more races. Hispanic or Latino of any race were 11.2% of the population.

There were 79 households, of which 32.9% had children under the age of 18 living with them, 60.8% were married couples living together, 3.8% had a female householder with no husband present, 3.8% had a male householder with no wife present, and 31.6% were non-families. 29.1% of all households were made up of individuals, and 15.2% had someone living alone who was 65 years of age or older. The average household size was 2.48 and the average family size was 3.04.

The median age in the city was 38.5 years. 27.6% of residents were under the age of 18; 7% were between the ages of 18 and 24; 24.5% were from 25 to 44; 28.1% were from 45 to 64; and 12.8% were 65 years of age or older. The gender makeup of the city was 50.5% male and 49.5% female.

=== 2000 census ===
As of the census of 2000, there were 187 people, 75 households, and 54 families living in the city. The population density was 684.8 inhabitants per square mile (264.4/km^{2}). There were 80 housing units at an average density of 292.9 per square mile (113.1/km^{2}). The racial makeup of the city was 100.00% White.

There were 75 households, out of which 33.3% had children under the age of 18 living with them, 69.3% were married couples living together, 2.7% had a female householder with no husband present, and 26.7% were non-families. 25.3% of all households were made up of individuals, and 14.7% had someone living alone who was 65 years of age or older. The average household size was 2.49 and the average family size was 3.02.

In the city, the population was spread out, with 24.1% under the age of 18, 8.6% from 18 to 24, 27.8% from 25 to 44, 24.1% from 45 to 64, and 15.5% who were 65 years of age or older. The median age was 36 years. For every 100 females, there were 94.8 males. For every 100 females age 18 and over, there were 94.5 males.

The median income for a household in the city was $38,750, and the median income for a family was $41,786. Males had a median income of $31,250 versus $20,625 for females. The per capita income for the city was $17,300. None of the families and 2.0% of the population were living below the poverty line, including no under eighteens and 16.7% of those over 64.

== Notable person ==
- Agnes Allen, pitcher and outfielder who played from 1950 to 1953 in the All-American Girls Professional Baseball League.
