= Cambra (disambiguation) =

Cambra was a mythical British queen; Cambra may also refer to:

- CAMBRA, an acronym for Caries Management by Risk Assessment
- Gary Cambra, American musician
- Cambra, Pennsylvania, an unincorporated community

== See also ==
- Luisa María Arvide Cambra
- Miquel Àngel Múrcia i Cambra
- Vale de Cambra
