= Virginia Bell (baseball) =

American baseball player

- Pitcher / Backup outfielder
- Born: July 30, 1927; Muskegon, Michigan, U.S.
- Died: April 19, 1994 (aged 66); Many, Louisiana, U.S.
- Batted: Right Threw: Right

Teams
- Springfield Sallies (1948)

Career highlights and awards
- Women in Baseball – AAGPBL Permanent Display at Baseball Hall of Fame and Museum (since 1988)

Virginia Bell (July 30, 1927 – April 19, 1994) was an American pitcher and outfielder who played in the All-American Girls Professional Baseball League (AAGPBL). Listed at 5' 3", 128. lb., Bell batted and threw right handed. She was dubbed Ginger.

Born in Muskegon, Michigan, Bell served for the Women's Army Corps in Japan during World War II before joining the league with the Springfield Sallies in its 1948 season.

Bell posted a 7.88 ERA in one pitching appearance and did not have a decision or save, allowing 10 runs (three unearned) on six hits and eight walks, while striking out four batters in 8.0 innings of work. As a hitter, she went 2-for-4 (.500 BA).

After baseball, Bell moved to Many, Louisiana, where she spent the rest of her life.

The AAGPBL folded in 1954, but there is a permanent display at the Baseball Hall of Fame and Museum at Cooperstown, New York, since November 5, 1988, that honors the entire league rather than any individual figure.

Ginger Bell died in 1994 at the age of 66.
