= Lenora Mandella =

American baseball player (1931–2005)

Lenora Mandella (May 4, 1931 – August 12, 2005) played shortstop and pitcher in the All-American Girls Professional Baseball League between 1949 and 1951. She both batted and threw right-handed. Her nickname was Smokey. She measured 5 feet 7 inches and weighed 145 pounds.

Born in McKeesport, Pennsylvania, Lenora became a pioneer in women's baseball, and was featured in the Hall of Fame in Cooperstown, New York on November 6, 1988. As well, she was a local duckpin bowler. She worked for the Glasshouse in Glassport, Operating Engineers Local 66 Insurance Fund in Monroeville and Copperweld until she retired. She died in Herminie, Pennsylvania.

== Baseball beginnings ==
Lenora first began her involvement in baseball when Philip K. Wrigley – owner of the Chicago Cubs – financed the league in the mid-1940s, when a lot of the men were called up to serve in World War II. In 1949, Lenora attended a tryout at McKeesport's Renziehausen Park. From that, she was sent on a trip to Sound Bend, Indiana for spring training. According to her friend Norma Dearfield, "she had a pretty good arm."

Lenora played for the Peoria Redwings (in 1951), the South Bend Blue Sox (in 1949), and the Springfield Sallies (in 1950).

== After baseball ==
Following her baseball career, Lenora coached softball for many years. Even in her later years, she received requests from local slow-pitch softball coaches to help out with practice. In terms of hobbies, she had a real love of cats, taking in as many as 22 stray cats at one time. She never married and, upon her death, was survived by her brother, Bernard, from Ligonier.

== Career statistics ==
Seasonal pitching records

Year	G	IP	R	ER	ERA	BB	SO	HB	WP	W	L	PCT
1949	-	-	-	-	-	-	-	-	-	-	-	-
1950	6	-	-	-	-	-	-	-	-	1	4	.200
1951	17	80	66	38	4.28	71	23	7	1	3	4	..428

Seasonal batting records

Year	G	AB	R	H	2B	3B	HR	RBI	SB	BB	SO	AVG
1949	-	-	-	-	-	-	-	-	-	-	-	.000
1950	43	146	15	19	2	3	0	12	3	15	36	.131
1951	17	27	1	3	2	0	0	4	0	2	2	.111

== Sources ==
1. . AAGPBL
2. . Google Books
3. . Pittsburgh Post-Gazette
