= Avonmore, Pennsylvania =

Borough in Pennsylvania, US

- Borough
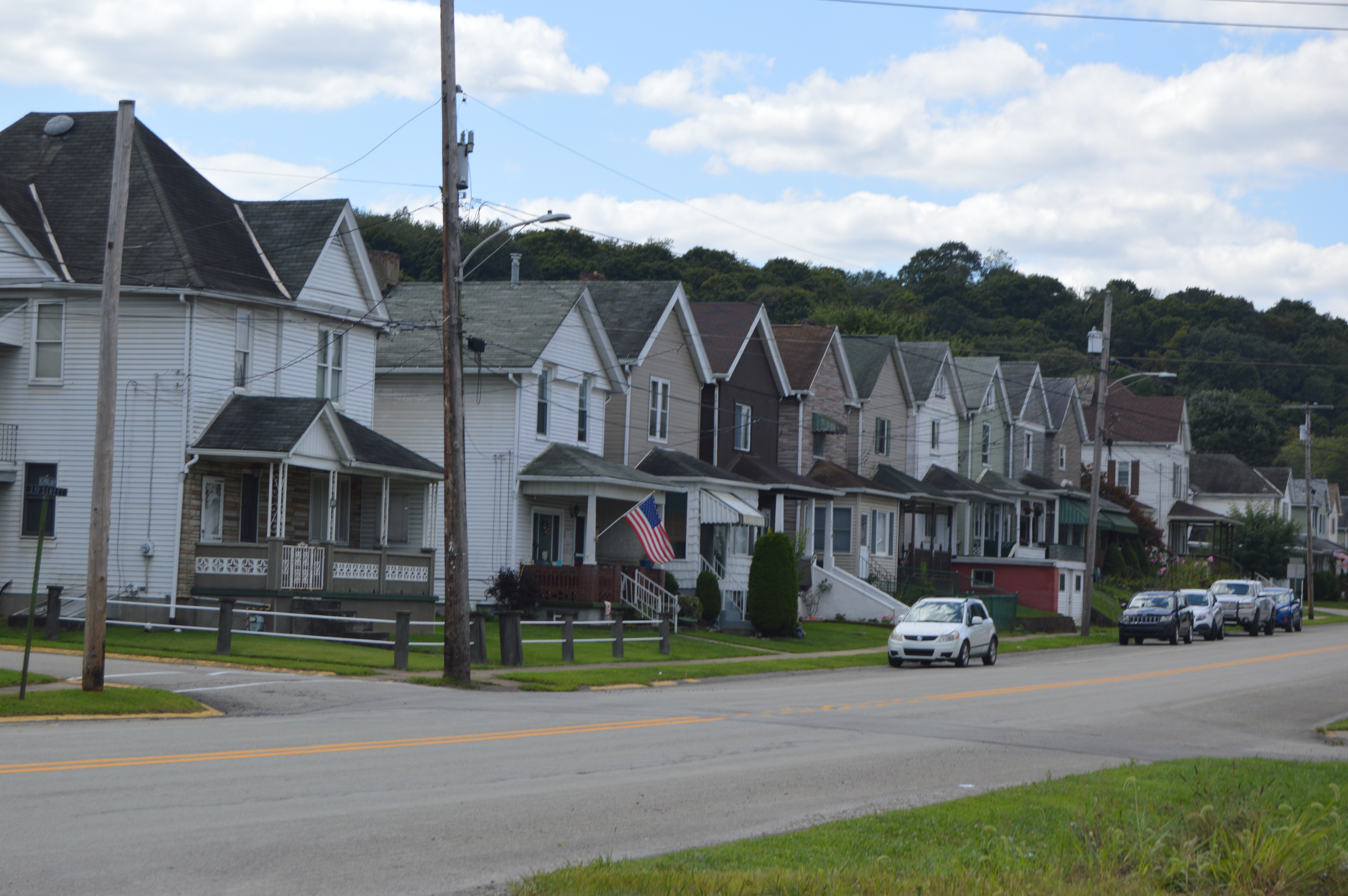
- Westmoreland Avenue

- Location of Avonmore in Westmoreland County, Pennsylvania.

- Location within Pennsylvania
- Coordinates: 40°31′40″N 79°27′58″W
- Country: United States
- State: Pennsylvania
- County: Westmoreland

Government
  - Type: Borough Council

Area
  - Total: 1.56 sq mi (4.03 km^{2})
  - Land: 1.47 sq mi (3.81 km^{2})
  - Water: 0.085 sq mi (0.22 km^{2})
- Elevation: 1,007 ft (307 m)

Population (2020)
  - Total: 900
  - Density: 612.0/sq mi (236.29/km^{2})
- Time zone: UTC-5 (Eastern (EST))
  - Summer (DST): UTC-4 (EDT)
- Zip code: 15618
- Area code: 724
- FIPS code: 42-03688

Avonmore is a borough in Westmoreland County, Pennsylvania, United States. The population was 901 at the 2020 census.

== Geography ==
Avonmore is located at 40°31′40″N 79°27′58″W (40.527750, -79.466186) in the Alle-Kiski Valley along the Kiskiminetas River.

According to the United States Census Bureau, the borough has a total area of 1.6 square miles (4.1 km^{2}), of which 1.5 square miles (3.9 km^{2}) is land and 0.1 square miles (0.3 km^{2}) (6.83%) is water.

== Demographics ==
Historical population
Census	Pop.	Note	%±
1900	630		—
1910	1,262		100.3%
1920	1,242		−1.6%
1930	1,240		−0.2%
1940	1,354		9.2%
1950	1,367		1.0%
1960	1,351		−1.2%
1970	1,267		−6.2%
1980	1,234		−2.6%
1990	1,089		−11.8%
2000	820		−24.7%
2010	1,011		23.3%
2020	900		−11.0%
2021 (est.)	894	▼	−0.7%

At the 2000 census there were 820 people living in the borough. However, that population has declined considerably in the last 13 years. The population density was 547.9 inhabitants per square mile (211.5/km^{2}). There were 376 housing units at an average density of 251.2 per square mile (97.0/km^{2}). The racial makeup of the borough was 98.17% White, 1.22% African American, 0.37% Asian, 0.12% from other races, and 0.12% from two or more races. Hispanic or Latino of any race were 0.37%.

Of the 344 households 26.5% had children under the age of 18 living with them, 56.4% were married couples living together, 8.4% had a female householder with no husband present, and 31.7% were non-families. 30.5% of households were one person and 18.0% were one person aged 65 or older. The average household size was 2.35 and the average family size was 2.89.

The age distribution was 21.6% under the age of 18, 5.1% from 18 to 24, 25.2% from 25 to 44, 24.6% from 45 to 64, and 23.4% 65 or older. The median age was 43 years. For every 100 females, there were 83.0 males. For every 100 females age 18 and over, there were 78.6 males.

About 7.7% of families and 9.2% of the population were below the poverty line, including 19.2% of those under age 18 and 6.8% of those age 65 or over

== Industry ==
Two foundries were located in Avonmore in the last decade of the nineteenth century. They were later consolidated into The National Roll and Foundry Company, with facilities situated on a terrace along Railroad Avenue above the Kiskiminetas River. The foundry employed 216 people by 1947. Later known as Akers National Roll, it closed in 2019, at which time it employed 119 people. The closure adversely impacted Avonmore, since its four bars, a small store, a Dollar General discount store and four churches all relied on millworkers to survive.

== Notable people ==
- Jill Corey, singer
- Alexis Knapp, actress and singer
- Joanne McComb, baseball player
