= Isora del Castillo =

- Infielder
- Born: May 16, 1932 (age 94); Havana, Cuba
- Bats: Right Throws: Right

Teams
- Chicago Colleens (1949); Kalamazoo Lassies (1950–1951); Kenosha Comets (1951)

Career highlights and awards
- Women in Baseball – AAGPBL Permanent Display at Baseball Hall of Fame and Museum (1988); Cuban Baseball Hall of Fame Inductee (1997)

Isora del Castillo [ee-soa'-ra del cast-ee'-yo] (born May 16, 1932) is a Cuban former infielder who played from 1949 through 1951 in the All-American Girls Professional Baseball League (AAGPBL). Listed at 5' 1", 117 lb., she batted and threw right handed. She played under the name of Ysora Castillo, as a result of a misspelling.

Born in Havana, the diminutive Isora del Castillo was one of seven players born in Cuba to play the All-American Girls Professional Baseball League in its twelve years history. The others were Isabel Alvarez, Luisa Gallegos, Mirtha Marrero, Migdalia Pérez, Gloria Ruiz and Zonia Vialat. A light-hitting, defensive specialist, Isora batted a measly .128 average in her three-year career, but collected a solid .305 on-base percentage and a 1.42 walk-to-strikeout ratio (100-to-70).

Isora learned her baseball skills from her father, Argelio del Castillo, a well-respected amateur shortstop in Cuba. She followed the steps of her father at shortstop, and also played efficiently at second base and third base. In 1947, at age 15, she played third base for the Habaneras, one of two women's teams that roamed Cuba playing games with each other.

The first AAGPBL spring training outside the United States was held in Cuba in 1947, as part of a plan to create an International League of Girls Baseball. The experiment took shape when Cuban executives Alfonso Rodríguez and Rafael León and AAGPBL president Max Carey formed two teams, one called the Cubans and the other called the Americans. Both teams toured Costa Rica, Nicaragua, Puerto Rico and Venezuela, playing exhibition games with each other. After that, Isora and her aforementioned fellows were contracted by the AAGPBL between 1948 and 1949.

She was assigned to the Chicago Colleens development team in 1949. The next season, she gained promotion to the Kalamazoo Lassies, playing for them one and a half years before joining the Kenosha Comets during the 1951 midseason. Isora retired after marrying Raymundo Kinney. After baseball, she worked in electronics for 40 years and became a hospital volunteer.

In 1988, she became part of Women in Baseball, a permanent display based at the Baseball Hall of Fame and Museum in Cooperstown, New York, which was unveiled to honor the entire All-American Girls Professional Baseball League.

Another tribute to the AAGPBL players came with the 1992 film A League of Their Own, featuring Tom Hanks, Geena Davis and Madonna, and directed by filmmaker Penny Marshall.

In 2011, she and her AAGPBL teammates from Cuba were honored by having their names and photos presented at a ceremony in New York City. The event was presented by Leslie Heaphy, history professor at Kent State University of Ohio, during the Cuban Baseball Congress held on August 20 at Fordham University.

In addition, Isora del Castillo is the only woman enshrined in the Cuban Baseball Hall of Fame, having been elected in 1997. She currently lives in Oklahoma.

== Career statistics ==
Batting

GP	AB	R	H	2B	3B	HR	RBI	SB	BB	SO	BA	OBP
250	399	38	51	7	2	0	23	8	102	70	.129	.305

Fielding

GP	PO	A	E	TC	DP	FA
179	243	402	50	695	35	.928
