= Jacqueline Mattson =

American baseball catcher (1928–2016)

Mattson

Jacqueline "Jackie" Mattson (November 16, 1928 – February 23, 2016) was an American baseball player who played in the catcher position. She played in the All-American Girls Professional Baseball League (AAGPBL) in 1950 and 1951, batting and throwing right-handed. She measured in at 5 foot 5 inches, weighing 100 pounds.

== Jackie's early life ==
Jackie was born in Waukegan, Illinois, the youngest of 8 children, to a carpenter father (Siebert) and homemaker mother (Edith Adeline), the latter of whom only finished fifth grade. Her mom was thus not always supportive of Jackie's love for baseball, with Jackie recalling: "She didn't like it at all. She could not understand why her 'little girl' found every moment she could to play baseball with the boys. I remember one time when my mother sent me to the store and on the way I went by some boys playing a scrub game. I joined them, and was two hours late getting back home. I was even late for supper, and as punishment, had to go without."

But it was not to be helped. Jackie simply "fell in love with the round ball when [she] was just able to walk. It [was] a gift, it was [her] salvation." In 1942—in order to try to ease some of the financial burdens her parents were encountering—Jackie moved to Milwaukee to live with her sister (14 years her senior), her husband and their five kids. And there began her introduction to organized ball. Her coaches in the Milwaukee playground were impressed with her passion for the game accompanied by her strong arm. Her love for sports was not confined to baseball though. Jackie also did well at basketball and speed skating, amongst other recreational activities.

== Jackie's baseball career ==
In 1944, Jackie became a bullpen catcher in a men's baseball team, which was where she learned to catch. She then moved on to catching in a local recreation department indoor softball league. During this time, she developed strong enough skills to be recruited to play fast-pitch ball a year later for the West Allis fast pitch league, having been sent by Bunny Brief and Jack Kloza. This league had a reputation for being a stepping stone to the AAGPBL.

Jackie played on the Majdecki Foods team alongside Eileen Burmeister, Marge Peters, and Edna Scheer, winning the championship 1–0. It was only this game that Jackie's mom watched her play.

== Jackie's education and work ==
Mattson was forced to move back to Waukegan in 1945 since her sister had just given birth to another baby and there was simply no more room so she went to Waukegan High School. But a year later she went back to Milwaukee, studying at the city's South Division High School and getting a diploma. During this time she was also able to play competitive ball again, working for Majdecki Foods to support herself. She then became a detailer and draftsman for the National Enameling and Stamping Company. For two years thereafter she played with the amateur Milwaukee Jets. She was seen by an AAGPBL scout and asked to try out for the league in Newark, in 1949. She was asked to participate in spring training that year with the South Bend Blue Sox. She was assigned to the Springfield Sallies in 1950 and played in 48 games.

Mattson later married Robert Orville Baumgart and raised a family.

== Career statistics ==
Year	G	AB	R	H	2B	3B	HR	RBI	SB	BB	SO	AVG
1950	48	175	17	35	4	0	0	18	2	21	25	.200
1951	22	51	6	5	0	0	0	3	1	7	7	.098
