= Margaret Murray (baseball) =

American baseball player

- Catcher / Outfielder
- Born: February 8, 1928; Joliet, Illinois, U.S.
- Died: March 22, 2006 (aged 78)
- Batted: Right Threw: Right

Teams
- Springfield Sallies (1948–1949)

Margaret Murray (February 8, 1928 – March 22, 2006) was an All-American Girls Professional Baseball League player. She batted and threw right handed.

Born in Joliet, Illinois, Murray joined the All American League in its 1948 season. "Marge", as her teammates dubbed her, was assigned as a catcher and fourth outfielder for the Springfield Sallies when it was added as an expansion club in the league. She continued with the Sallies the next season when it became a touring player development team. Afterwards, she moved to Green Valley, Arizona.

In 1988, a permanent display was inaugurated at the Baseball Hall of Fame and Museum in Cooperstown, New York, that honors those who were part of the All-American Girls Professional Baseball League. Murray, the rest of the girls, and the league staff are included at the display/exhibit.
