= Mary Louise Kolanko =

American baseball player

- Born: May 16, 1932; Weirton, West Virginia, U.S.
- Died: October 9, 2007 (aged 75); Tampa, Florida, U.S.
- Batted: Left Threw: Left

debut
- 1950

Last appearance
- 1950

Teams
- Peoria Redwings (1950); Springfield Sallies (1950)

Career highlights and awards
- Women in Baseball – AAGPBL Permanent Display Baseball Hall of Fame and Museum (1988)

Mary Louise Kolanko (May 16, 1932 – October 9, 2007) was an American All-American Girls Professional Baseball League player in 1950. She was born in Weirton, West Virginia, the youngest of eight children, to parents John and Mary Kolanko. She had five older brothers. Her nickname was Klinky. She both threw and batted left-handed. She measured 5 foot 2 inches and weighed 124 pounds.

== Pre-baseball ==
Before she started playing professionally in the league, Mary Lou enjoyed playing with her five older brothers. She studied at Weir High School, where she was head cheerleader. But she never got the opportunity to play baseball in either high school or college. However, she did enjoy playing fast pitch softball when she lived in Weirton and Steubenville, during her teenage years. And it was during those years, that she was scouted by the AAGPBL.

== Baseball ==
Mary Lou was asked to come to tryouts at Spring training in 1950 in McKeesport, Pennsylvania, followed by a training camp in South Bend, Indiana. She only played in one season, in 1950. Mary Lou's professional baseball league career was quite short. She spent half of that time with the Peoria Redwings and the other half with the Springfield Sallies. She earned a reputation for being a fast runner.

Even though she spent only one season with the league, during that time she traveled a lot, covering 17 states, as well as Canada. One of her career highlights was playing at the Yankee Stadium and doing a warm-up with Phil Rizzuto, the Hall of Fame shortstop. She was honored in the Baseball Hall of Fame, Cooperstown, New York.

== Post baseball ==
After baseball, she moved back to Weirton and took on a position at the Bank of Weirton. She got a master's degree. Thereafter, she joined the convent and joined the Franciscan Sisters of Our Lady of Perpetual Help, St. Louis. She also taught at a school for a decade-and-a-half. Then her parents became ill, so she left and went to teach in the public school system for the next 20 years. She was part of the movement to establish women's sports programs in schools as well. Following her retirement, she enjoyed playing golf and jogging. She died after a short illness in St. Joseph Hospital, Tampa, Florida.

== Career statistics ==
Year	G	AB	R	H	2B	3B	HR	RBI	SB	BB	SO	AVG
1950	45	172	36	49	1	2	0	20	24	36	13	.285
