= Springfield Sallies =

Defunct women's professional baseball team

1948 Springfield Sallies Front row, L-R: Zonia Vialat, Virginia Bell, Margaret Murray, Doris Neal, Ruby Stephens. Second row, L-R: Shirley Stovroff, Jane Stoll, Patricia Scott, Carson Bigbee (manager), Margaret Wenzell, Evelyn Wawryshyn, Julie Gutz. Back row, L-R: Mildred Meacham, June Schofield, Esther Hershey, Erma Bergmann, Doris Barr, Barbara Barbaze, Jean Marlowe, Mary Rudis (chaperone).

The Springfield Sallies were a women's professional baseball team who were members of the All-American Girls Professional Baseball League (AAGPBL) in the 1948 season and became a development team. The Sallies were based in Springfield, Illinois, and played home games at Jim Fitzpatrick Memorial Stadium.

== History ==
The hapless Sallies were the worst in the league, getting roughed up as a last–place expansion club with a 41–84 record, ending 35.5 games behind the 1st place Racine Belles in the Western Division.

The club was managed by former bigleaguer Carson Bigbee, but had no All–Stars, and the only players to have a significant year were second sacker Evelyn Wawryshyn, who tied for sixth place with a .266 batting average, and pitcher Doris Barr, who posted a 2.68 ERA with a career-high 116 strikeouts despite her 7–19 record.

From 1949 through 1951 the Sallies joined the Chicago Colleens as touring player development teams. Their tours included exhibition contests at Griffith Stadium and Yankee Stadium, then dissolved entirely by 1951.

AAGPBL executive Mitch Skupien, who later managed in the league, served as the general manager for both touring teams.

== All-time roster ==
- Gertrude Alderfer
- Agnes Allen
- Norene Arnold
- Barbara Barbaze
- Doris Barr
- Fern Battaglia
- Mary Baumgartner
- Betty Bays
- Virginia Bell
- Lois Bellman
- Norma Berger
- Erma Bergmann
- Shirley Burkovich
- Ann Cindric
- Doris Cook
- Betty Jane Cornett
- Mildred Deegan
- Audrey Deemer
- Betty Degner
- Beverly Dustrude
- June Emerson
- Anita Foss
- Betty Fountain
- Luisa Gallegos
- Beulah Anne Georges
- Eileen Gascon
- Julie Gutz
- Esther Ann Hershey
- Frances Janssen
- Daisy Junor
- Mary Louise Kolanko
- Barbara Liebrich
- Kay Lionikas
- Joanne McComb
- Lenora Mandella
- Jean Marlowe
- Jacqueline Mattson
- Mildred Meacham
- Ruth Middleton
- Jane Moffet
- Mary Moore
- Nancy Mudge
- Margaret Murray
- Doris Neal
- Dolly Niemiec
- Anna Mae O'Dowd
- Toni Palermo
- Barbara Payne
- Migdalia Pérez
- Earlene Risinger
- Martha Rommelaere
- Terry Rukavina
- Audrey Schenck
- June Schofield
- Pat Scott
- Lillian Shadic
- Ruby Stephens
- Jane Stoll
- Shirley Stovroff
- Zonia Vialat
- Helen Walulik
- Evelyn Wawryshyn
- Margaret Wenzell
- Renae Youngberg

Managers

* Carson Bigbee	1948
* Len Zintac	1949

Manager–Chaperone

* Barbara Liebrich	1950

Chaperone

* Mary Rudis	1948; 1949

== Sources ==
- All-American Girls Professional Baseball League history
- All-American Girls Professional Baseball League official website – Springfield Sallies seasons
- All-American Girls Professional Baseball League official website – Manager/Player profile search results
- All-American Girls Professional Baseball League Record Book – W. C. Madden. Publisher: McFarland & Company, 2000. Format: Hardcover, 294pp. Language: English. ISBN 0-7864-0597-X
- The Women of the All-American Girls Professional Baseball League: A Biographical Dictionary – W. C. Madden. Publisher: McFarland & Company, 2005. Format: Softcover, 295 pp. Language: English. ISBN 978-0-7864-2263-0
- Golden Age Era Sports
