= Barbara Barbaze =

Canadian baseball player

- Outfielder
- Born: January 17, 1923; Toronto, Ontario, Canada
- Died: April 21, 2013 (aged 90); Gaylord, Michigan, US
- Batted: Right Threw: Right

Teams
- Springfield Sallies (1948)

Career highlights and awards
- Canadian Baseball Hall of Fame honorary induction (1998); Women in Baseball – AAGPBL Permanent Display at Baseball Hall of Fame and Museum (1988)

Barbara Barbaze (January 17, 1923 – April 21, 2013) was a Canadian outfielder who played in the All-American Girls Professional Baseball League (AAGPBL). She batted and threw right handed.

Born in Toronto, Ontario, Barbara Barbaze was one of the 68 players born in Canada to join the All-American Girls Professional Baseball League in its twelve years history. A fleet-footed outfielder and fast base runner, she joined the Springfield Sallies during the 1948 season. She was not located after leaving the league in that season.

In 1998, Barbaze gained honorary induction into the Canadian Baseball Hall of Fame. She is also part of the AAGPBL permanent display at the Baseball Hall of Fame and Museum at Cooperstown, New York, which was unveiled in 1988 to honor the entire All-American Girls Professional Baseball League.

== Career statistics ==
Batting

GP	AB	R	H	2B	3B	HR	RBI	SB	TB	BB	SO	BA	OBP	SLG
80	223	19	43	2	0	0	16	23	45	24	29	.193	.271	.202

Fielding

GP	PO	A	E	TC	DP	FA
76	104	5	11	130	1	.908
