= Eileen Gascon =

- Center field / Second base
- Born: December 1, 1931 (age 94); Chicago, Illinois, U.S.
- Bats: Right Throws: Right
- Stats at Baseball Reference

Teams
- Springfield Sallies (1949); Battle Creek Belles (1951); Grand Rapids Chicks (1951); Peoria Redwings (1951)

Career highlights and awards
- Women in Baseball – AAGPBL Permanent Display at Baseball Hall of Fame and Museum (1988)

Eileen "Ginger" Gascon (born December 1, 1931) is a former baseball player who played center field and second base in the All-American Girls Professional Baseball League (AAGPBL). She both batted and threw right-handed.

== Early life and career ==
Born in Chicago, Illinois, she lived for around a decade (from when she was 8 until 18) near Wrigley Field. She was the youngest of three sisters. Her Irish immigrant mother was a housewife and her father worked as a truck driver. Since there were very few girls in the neighborhood from the time she turned 10, Gascon had to play ball otherwise she wouldn't have anyone with whom to play. She was pretty good and always went to the division meetings.

Gascon studied Education and Psychology at a local college, the Northeastern Illinois State College in Chicago. She used her education to become an elementary teacher for six years and following that, a counselor for 28 years. Since she lived close to the Wrigley Field and her uncle was a policeman who worked at the gate there, Gascon was often given the opportunity to watch Phil Cavarretta, Andy Pafko, etc. Thus began her love for the game. At around 15 years old, Gascon played started playing with the North Town Debs and then the girls started forming groups which was when she went with the Springfield Sallies. With the Sallies, she played second base. Some of her other friends at the time joined the Chicago Colleens. She was recruited from playing in the Chicago playgrounds. In the traveling team she was with Mirtha Marrero and Isabel Alvarez with whom she was able to converse in Spanish since she had studied it in high school.

In 1949 she played with the traveling team and a year later, she returned to play with Chicago, for the Bluebirds also for a year, playing center field. In 1951, Gascon returned to the Grand Rapids Chicks, thereafter playing a further three years again with the Bluebirds. During this time she was able to work a day job and play ball simultaneously. In addition, she played with the Peoria Redwings.

Gascon was the youngest member of the Chicago Queens, at a time when the New Orleans Jacks teams were part of it who really knew what they were doing, producing some of the best pitchers. Connie Wisnwiewski was also in that league, who had also come to the Grand Rapids Chicks. When Gascon played with the Grand Rapids Chicks, she was an outfielder.

== Present day ==
As of 2018, Gascon still attends Chicago Cubs games and expresses a desire to inspire women to continue to play baseball.

== Batting statistics ==
Year	GP	AB	R	H	2B	3B	HR	RBI	SB	TB	BB	SO	BA	OBP	SLG	OPS
1951	27	87	12	16	2	0	0	4	7	18	16	9	.184	.311	.207	.518
