= Gloria Ruiz =

- Outfield
- Born: June 25, 1928 (age 98); Havana, Cuba
- Bats: Right Throws: Right

Teams
- Peoria Redwings (1948–1949)

Gloria "Baby-Face" Ruiz (born June 25, 1928) is a Cuban former outfielder who played from 1948 through 1949 in the All-American Girls Professional Baseball League (AAGPBL). She batted and threw right handed.

== Biography ==
Born in Havana, Ruiz was one of seven girls born in Cuba to play in the All-American Girls Professional Baseball League in its twelve years history. The other Cubanas who went on to play in the league were Isabel Alvarez (1949–1954), Isora del Castillo (1949–1951), Luisa Gallegos (1948–1949), Migdalia Pérez (1948–1954), Mirtha Marrero (1948–53) and Zonia Vialat (1948).

The first AAGPBL spring training outside the United States was held in Cuba in 1947, as part of a plan to create an International League of Girls Baseball. The experiment took shape when Cuban executives Alfonso Rodríguez and Rafael León and AAGPBL president Max Carey formed two teams, one called the Cubans and the other called the Americans. Both teams toured Costa Rica, Nicaragua, Puerto Rico and Venezuela, playing exhibition games with each other. After that, Ruiz and her aforementioned fellows were contracted by the AAGPBL. Ruiz was added to the Peoria Redwings roster in parts of two seasons, spanning from 1948 to 1949. She was used by Peoria manager Leo Schrall as a backup for Josephine Lenard, Mary Reynolds and Eilaine Roth.

In 1988, Ruiz and the other six Cuban girls were honored during the opening of Women in Baseball, a permanent display based at the Baseball Hall of Fame and Museum in Cooperstown, New York, which was unveiled to honor the entire All-American Girls Professional Baseball League. Another tribute to the AAGPBL players came with the 1992 film A League of Their Own, featuring Tom Hanks, Geena Davis and Madonna, and directed by filmmaker Penny Marshall. In 2011, Ruiz and her AAGPBL teammates from Cuba were honored by having their names and photos presented at a ceremony in New York City. The event was presented by Leslie Heaphy, history professor at Kent State University of Ohio, during the Cuban Baseball Congress held on August 20 at Fordham University.

== Career statistics ==
Batting

GP	AB	R	H	2B	3B	HR	RBI	SB	BB	SO	BA	OBP
52	126	8	12	0	0	0	8	10	19	26	.095	.214

Fielding

GP	PO	A	E	TC	DP	FA
50	60	3	4	67	2	.940
