= Agnes Allen (baseball) =

- Pitcher / Outfield
- Born: September 21, 1930; Alvord, Iowa, U.S.
- Died: February 24, 2012 (aged 81); Flandreau, South Dakota, U.S.
- Batted: Right Threw: Right
- Stats at Baseball Reference

Teams
- Springfield Sallies (1950); Kalamazoo Lassies (1951, 1952–1953); Battle Creek Belles (1951)

Career highlights and awards
- Women in Baseball – AAGPBL Permanent Display at Baseball Hall of Fame and Museum (1988)

Agnes Lorraine "Aggie" Allen (September 21, 1930 – February 24, 2012) was a pitcher and outfielder who played from 1950 through 1953 in the All-American Girls Professional Baseball League (AAGPBL). Listed at 5 ft 3 in (1.60 m), 120 lb, she batted and threw right-handed.

== Early life ==
Born in Alvord, Iowa, Agnes Allen was one of five children into the family of Edward and Bernice (Martin) Allen. She was taught by her father to throw a baseball at an early age, and they played catch almost every day. As a teenager, she accustomed to play baseball with her father and two brothers, who were semi-professional pitchers, so they taught her how to pitch a fastball, a changeup and a curveball.

Allen later attended St. Mary's High School in Larchwood, where she started to play organized softball and basketball. She read about the AAGPBL in a local newspaper and conned her father into taking her to a tryout in Cedar Rapids. She then was invited to Wrigley Field for another tryout and made the grade.

== Athletic career ==
Allen entered the league in 1950 with the Springfield Sallies. She responded with a 9–5 record in 15 pitching appearances, while hitting a .179 batting average. Her biggest experience was pitching a game in the old Yankee Stadium and meeting the legendary Connie Mack.

She was promoted to the Kalamazoo Lassies in 1951, but during the midseason was loaned to the Battle Creek Belles for five games, returning to Kalamazoo for the rest of the year. Allen posted a combined 3–10 record and a 6.21 earned run average in 24 games. She suffered control issues on the mound the next season and was moved to the outfield, ending with a 1–7 mark and a 6.00 ERA while hitting .161 in 56 games. She improved her numbers in 1953, her last season, going 10–9 and lowering her ERA to 3.70 in 24 games.

== Medical career ==
Following her baseball career, Allen applied for a Mortar Board at Western Michigan University. After teaching for three years, she was employed as a physical therapist at the Mayo Clinic in Rochester, Minnesota. She also worked for Presentation Health Systems and for McKennan Hospital before becoming a self-employed physical therapist for Canton Inwood Memorial Hospital.

== Later life ==
Allen retired after 35 years of work. In her spare time, she was both a member of the American Legion Auxiliary and the Elmwood Ladies Golf League.

In 1988 she became part of Women in Baseball, a permanent display based at the Baseball Hall of Fame and Museum in Cooperstown, New York, which was unveiled to honor the entire All-American Girls Professional Baseball League rather than any individual personality.

Agnes Allen died in Flandreau, South Dakota at the age of 81.

== Career statistics ==
Pitching

GP	W	L	W-L%	ERA	IP	H	RA	ER	BB	SO
60	14	26	.350	4.87	324	290	235	178	296	134

Batting

GP	AB	R	H	2B	3B	HR	RBI	SB	BB	SO	BA
138	335	31	55	6	1	0	19	7	20	29	.164

Fielding

GP	PO	A	E	TC	FA
104	90	144	24	158	.848
