= Zonia Vialat =

- Born: Havana, Cuba

Teams
- Springfield Sallies (1948)

Zonia Vialat was a Cuban All-American Girls Professional Baseball League player.

Little is known about this woman who had an extremely short career in the league.

Born in Havana, Zonia Vialat was one of seven girls born in Cuba to play in the All-American Girls Professional Baseball League in its twelve-year history. Besides her, other Cubanas who played in the league were Luisa Gallegos, Mirtha Marrero, Migdalia Pérez and Gloria Ruiz. All of them debuted in 1948. The next year were added Isabel Alvarez and Isora del Castillo.

Vialat appeared in only one game with the Springfield Sallies before returning to Cuba. She went hitless in one at bat and did not have fielding chances.

Opening in 1988, Women in Baseball, a permanent display based at the Baseball Hall of Fame and Museum in Cooperstown, New York, was installed to honor the entire All-American Girls Professional Baseball League. Penny Marshall's 1992 film A League of Their Own, a fictionalized account of activities in the AAGPBL, brought many of the real former players a rebirth of celebrity.

In 2011, Zonia Vialat and her AAGPBL teammates from Cuba were honored by having their names and photos presented at a ceremony in New York City. The event was presented by Leslie Heaphy, history professor at Kent State University of Ohio, during the Cuban Baseball Congress held on August 20 at Fordham University.
