= Miquel Àngel Múrcia i Cambra =

European composition (born 1982)

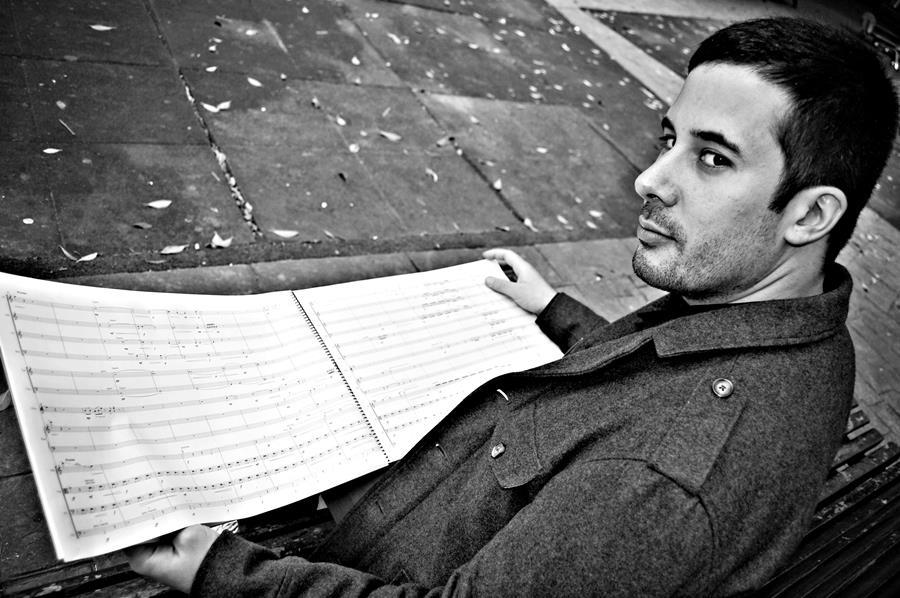
Miquelangelmurciaicambra

Miquel Àngel Múrcia i Cambra is a European Composition on the faculty of an Conservatory of Music. Also known as @miquimusica His background includes a Degree in Contemporary History and a PhD in History. He is nowadays known as a "great exponent of the electroacoustic in Europe" thanks to his enormous and incipient electroacoustic music, audiovisual, chamber music and ensemble premieres in recent years in several European countries. His music is published in printed scores and included in numerous compilations of contemporary Spanish music. (Coleccion-AMEE, Miniaturas25)

He has received commissions from many countries and, among his many works premiered the most outstanding are the ones for the "Magritte Museum" in Belgium during the period 2009–2010. He has also premiered at many leading festivals, such as the SIMA FountCourt (France, Dijon), in 2011 and at the "Talent Festival" part of the prestigious Berlinale (Berlin). He has actively taken part in the 17th, 18th and 19th (2010-2012) "Meeting Point International Festivals" and his music has been included for the regular programme of Phonos Barcelona, and Carnegie Ensembe Contemporary (USA 2012). Moreover, Miquel Àngel Múrcia i Cambra is working to reissue a critical study of the romantic musical composer Josep Melcior Gomis. He is part of the Spanish Association of Electronic Music. In 2024, he was the composer selected by the Foundations for Iberian Music in New York for a commissioned work, becoming part of a select list of composers.
