= Barbara Payne =

American baseball player (1932–2024)

- Shortstop
- Born: September 18, 1932; Shreveport, Louisiana, U.S.
- Died: March 11, 2024 (aged 91)
- Batted: Right Threw: Right

Teams
- Springfield Sallies (1949); Muskegon Lassies (1950[start]); Kalamazoo Lassies (1950[end], 1951[start]); Battle Creek Belles (1951[mid]); Rockford Peaches (1951[end])

Career highlights and awards
- Postseason appearance (1951); Women in Baseball – AAGPBL Permanent Display at Baseball Hall of Fame and Museum (1988)

Barbara J. "Bobbie" Payne (September 18, 1932 – March 11, 2024) was an American infielder and reliever who played from 1949 through 1951 in the All-American Girls Professional Baseball League (AAGPBL). Listed at 5 ft 7 in (1.70 m), 118 lb, she batted and threw right-handed.

== Biography ==
A Shreveport native, Barbara Payne was the only girl born in the state of Louisiana to join the league in its twelve years history.

At age of 11 Payne was the youngest girl to play on the Shreveport Garmet softball team. She then joined the Elite Cleaners in 1949, when the AAGPBL rookie touring teams stopped in Shreveport for exhibition games. The Chicago Colleens and the Springfield Sallies traveled together over much of the eastern half of the United States playing games against each other to recruit new players. The tour gave these new recruits an opportunity to play and also gave the league the opportunity to develop new baseball talent around the country. The teams held a tryout at Shreveport and signed Payne up. She was assigned to the Springfield team and made her debut in her hometown before going on an exhausting tour of 22 states.

In 1950, Payne was allowed to graduate from high school a month early so that she could be able to join the Muskegon Lassies at the spring training camp. She was called ″pepper pot″ by her teammates, because she was not afraid to go after any ground ball. Although the 1950 season became a nightmare for her team, after registering the worst record in the league and a relocation during the midseason to Kalamazoo, Michigan, where it was renamed the Kalamazoo Lassies. Payne hit a .190 batting average in 100 games, playing mainly at shortstop, but she filled in at other infield positions and eventually was used as an emergency pitcher.

Payne opened 1951 with Kalamazoo, but was sent to the Battle Creek Belles during the midseason and ended up playing with the Rockford Peaches during the postseason. She batted a combined .173 average in 85 games, while tying for eight in the league for the most triples (5). Rockford blanked the Grand Rapids in the first round in two games, but lost to the South Bend Blue Sox the final round three games to two. She went 0-for-5 in two playoff appearances.

In 1951 the league suffered its three-year attendance slide and began having financial difficulties. The Kenosha Comets and the Peoria Redwings were forced to fold after the season, leaving the league with six clubs. Some players, Payne among others, were seeing the beginning of the end and they were cautious. Many of them made their move to other leagues and others opted to retire. Then, she took up a career as a radiology technician that would take her to work for a government office for 40 years. After retiring in 1992, she embarked on a career as a golfer that led her to get a number of local titles to her credit. Finally, the league folded at the end of the 1954 season.

It was not until 37 years after her stint in the AAGPBL that Payne became a subject of notoriety. In the early 1980s, a group of former members of the league led by June Peppas created the AAGPBL Players Association and lobbied to have the circuit recognized in the National Baseball Hall of Fame and Museum at Cooperstown, New York. After that, she attended the league reunions. The association was largely responsible for the opening of Women in Baseball, a permanent display at the Hall, which was unveiled in 1988 to honor the entire All-American Girls Professional Baseball League. Yet it was not really a well known fact until 1992, when filmmaker Penny Marshall premiered her film A League of Their Own, which was a fictionalized account of activities during the first season of the league. This film brought a rejuvenated interest to the extinct league, while many of the real players began to earn a rebirth of celebrity over the years forthcoming.

Payne later resided in Surprise, Arizona. She died on March 11, 2024, at the age of 91.

== Career statistics ==
Batting

GP	AB	R	H	2B	3B	HR	RBI	SB	TB	BB	SO	BA	OBP	SLG
194	593	57	108	12	6	0	49	17	132	62	92	.182	.260	.226

Fielding

GP	PO	A	E	TC	DP	FA
195	347	424	115	886	43	.879

Note: Since the league counted the 1950 tour as exhibition games no official statistics were kept.
