= Elizabeth Fabac =

- Second base
- Born: April 6, 1922; Detroit, Michigan, U.S.
- Died: July 9, 2008 (aged 86); Redding, California, U.S.
- Batted: Right Threw: Right

Teams
- Kenosha Comets (1945–1948)

Career highlights and awards
- Two-time best season fielding average at second base (1947–1948); Postseason appearance (1948); Women in Baseball – AAGPBL Permanent Display at Baseball Hall of Fame and Museum (1988)

Elizabeth Fabac (later Bretting; April 6, 1922 – July 9, 2008) was an infielder who played from 1945 through 1948 in the All-American Girls Professional Baseball League (AAGPBL). Listed at 5 ft 3 in (1.60 m), 115 lb., she batted and threw right-handed.

During her four years in the AAGPBL, Fabac played excellent defense at second base and twice led the circuit in fielding average at her position. Overall, she committed 43 errors in 1189 total chances for a .950 career average. A disciplined hitter with great knowledge of the strike zone, she posted a career 1.26 BB/K, having the ability to consistently hit the ball hard to all fields.

Born in Detroit, Michigan, Betty Fabac started playing on a softball league in Detroit, where an AAGPBL scout asked her to come to the league. She attended spring training at Opa-locka, Florida in 1945 and was assigned to the Kenosha Comets, playing for them through the 1948 season.

In her rookie season, Fabac collected a .199 batting average with a .286 on-base percentage and fielded her position well. The next year she broke her ankle during the first week of playing, when a girl jumped on it trying to break up a double play at second base. She was out for the rest of year, but returned in 1947 to lead the league in fielding average with a .963 mark.

Her most productive season came in 1948, when she posted career numbers in games (123), hits (85), runs (68), stolen bases (43) and walks (68), while tying with Peoria Redwings' Alice DeCambra for the best average at second base (.963).

Fabac gave up baseball to marry Naval Academy graduate Ralph Bretting in 1949. The couple raised daughter Patti and son George in Jackson, Michigan. In her spare time, Fabac took up golf and became a specialist in her new sports activity, winning eight local and country tournaments in a row during a productive stretch. She was also an avid bridge player.

In 1988, she became part of Women in Baseball, a permanent display based at the Baseball Hall of Fame and Museum in Cooperstown, New York, which was unveiled to honor the entire All-American Girls Professional Baseball League.

After their children were married in the 1970s, Betty and Ralph relocated in Southern California, where she took a job at Data Card Corporation. Widowed in 1998, she moved to Northern California in 2001 to live with her daughter, who cared for her during the next six years before entering The Vistas Assisted Living & Memory Care facility in Redding, California.

Elizabeth Fabac Bretting died in 2008, aged 86, following complications from Alzheimer's disease.

== Career statistics ==
Batting

GP	AB	R	H	2B	3B	HR	RBI	SB	TB	BB	SO	BA	OBP	SLG
321	1102	141	197	7	5	1	47	124	217	144	114	.179	.274	.197

Fielding

GP	PO	A	E	TC	DP	FA
309	548	581	60	1189	43	.950
