= Migdalia Pérez =

Cuban baseball player (1926–2019)

- Pitcher
- Born: November 6, 1926; Havana, Cuba
- Died: October 26, 2019 (aged 92)
- Batted: Right Threw: Right

Teams
- Chicago Colleens (1948); Springfield Sallies (1949–1950); Battle Creek Belles (1951–1952); Rockford Peaches (1952–1954)

Career highlights and awards
- Pitched a no-hitter (1953); Single-season leader in complete games (1951) innings pitched (1951) games pitched (1952)

Migdalia "Mickey" Pérez (November 6, 1926 – October 26, 2019) was a Cuban pitcher who played from 1948 through 1954 in the All-American Girls Professional Baseball League (AAGPBL). She batted and threw right handed. After being married she played under the name of Migdalia Jinright.

Born in Havana, Mickey Pérez was one of the seven players born in Cuba to play the All-American Girls Professional Baseball League in its twelve years history, being the others Isabel Alvarez (1949–1954), Isora del Castillo (1949–1951), Luisa Gallegos (1948–1949), Mirtha Marrero (1948–1953), Gloria Ruiz (1948–1949) and Zonia Vialat (1948).

The first AAGPBL spring training outside the United States was held in 1947 in Havana, Cuba, as part of a plan to create an International League of Girls Baseball. All the eight AAGPBL teams played exhibition games at Estadio Latinoamericano. On the other hand, the Brooklyn Dodgers trained in the Cuban capital because Jackie Robinson, who would be the first Afro-American to play in the Major Leagues, was training with the Dodgers for the first time. By then, city ordinances in Vero Beach, Florida, where the Dodgers normally trained, prevented blacks and whites players from competing on the same field against each other. Notably, newspaper stories from Havana indicate that the All-American girls drew larger crowds for their games than did the Dodgers. At this time, the six Cuban women were recruited to play in the AAGPBL. That season the league made the transition from underhand to full sidearm pitching.

Pérez entered the league in 1948 with the Chicago Colleens, playing for them one year before joining the Springfield Sallies (1949–1950), Battle Creek Belles (1951–1952) and Rockford Peaches (1952–1954). She had a diverse repertoire of pitches, which included a strong fastball, a curve, and a change that often had hitters way out in front, but the key was always be in control of her pitches. When the ball-strike count favored her, she was solid and concentrated better. When she was behind, she was vulnerable and created many of her own problems because she had to sacrifice some velocity for control. In addition, she was plagued by a shortage of run support for much of her career while pitching for awful teams.

In 1951, Pérez posted a 13–16 record and a 3.00 earned run average in 32 pitching appearances for the Belles, while leading the league in complete games (26), innings pitched (237) and hits allowed (241). The next season she went 11–12 with a 2.34 ERA in a combined action between Battle Creek and Rockford, leading the league in games pitched (33) and ranking sixth in innings pitched (208).

Pérez had mixed results in the 1953 season, going 12–14 for Racine though her 2.25 ERA was the ninth best in the league. She also finished eighth in innings pitched (220) and tied for eighth in complete games (20). Her career highlight came on August 10 of that year, when she hurled a no-hitter against the powerful Grand Rapids Chicks lineup featuring Wilma Briggs, Betty Foss, Jean Geissinger, Katie Horstman, Pepper Paire and Joanne Weaver, among others.

In 1954, during what turned out to be the final season of the league, Pérez went 11–11 in 24 games and ended third in innings pitched (164), eighth in complete games (15) and tenth in ERA (3.73), while tying for sixth in wins.

Pérez compiled a 57–70 record in 155 games, while her 2.73 career ERA ranks her twenty-second in the all-time list of AAGPBL pitchers with at least 1,000 innings of work. She also went 1–3 with a 3.00 ERA in five playoff games (two years).

In 1988, Pérez became part of Women in Baseball, a permanent display based at the Baseball Hall of Fame and Museum in Cooperstown, New York, which was unveiled to honor the entire All-American Girls Professional Baseball League.

Another tribute to the AAGPBL players came with the 1992 film A League of Their Own, featuring Tom Hanks, Geena Davis and Madonna, and directed by filmmaker Penny Marshall.

== Pitching statistics ==
GP	W	L	W-L%	ERA	IP	H	RA	ER	BB	SO	WHIP
155	57	70	.449	2.73	1069	1076	506	324	122	116	1.12
