= Luisa Arvide =

Professor of Arabic and Islamic Studies

Luisa Arvide Cambra (born in Almeria, Spain, August 10, 1956) is a Doctor in Arabic Studies with an Extraordinary Degree Award and Special Award Doctorate. She has taught at the University of Granada and University of Almeria, and from September 2011 is Professor of Arabic and Islamic Studies at Almeria. She has been guest professor at many scientific institutions, including University of Heidelberg, University of Leiden and University of Cambridge, in Europe, as well as Georgetown University, Harvard University, Yale University and the University of California, Berkeley in the United States, and she has done stays of study in Arab countries, such as Syria, Jordan, Egypt and Tunis. She has been director of research projects on medieval Arabic science, and Arab philosophy and literature and lectured on the Arab and Islamic world in Spain and abroad. She has also coordinated research contracts of the European Union within the Erasmus and Socrates programs. She specializes mainly in medieval Arabic medicine, and has written eight books and over fifty articles , among them studies of the famous Andalusian surgeon Abulcasis, in the field of Islamic science, as well as Al-Hariri of Basra´s Maqamat, in the field of literature, and Ibn Sabin´s Sicilian Questions, in the area of philosophy.

She is a member of several international scientific associations; Director of the research group HUM 113-Philological Studies from Junta de Andalucia; and Deputy Director General for Europe of the IBC.
