= Anita Foss =

American baseball player (1921–2015)

- Second base / Pitcher
- Born: August 5, 1921; Providence, Rhode Island, U.S.
- Died: 2015 (aged 93–94)
- Batted: Right Threw: Right

Teams
- Springfield Sallies (1948); Muskegon Lassies (1948; 1949); Grand Rapids Chicks (1948); Rockford Peaches (1949)

Career highlights and awards
- Women in Baseball – AAGPBL Permanent Display at the Baseball Hall of Fame and Museum (unveiled in 1988)

Anita Foss (August 5, 1921 – 2015) was an All-American Girls Professional Baseball League ballplayer. Listed at 5' 2", 118 lb., she batted and threw right handed.

Anita Foss joined the All-American League after her husband was killed in action during World War II. Described as a scrappy hitter and good fielder, she moved around for a while, as the league shifted players as needed to help teams stay afloat.

Born in Providence, Rhode Island, Foss began learning baseball at an early age with her four brothers. While at high school, she participated in a wide variety of sports and became the captain of the varsity softball team. After graduating, she married and her husband went off to war, being killed while serving in the U.S. Navy.

Thereafter, Foss played organized softball and was seen by a league scout. As a result, she was invited to a tryout in New Jersey and made the grade.

Subsequently, Foss was sent to Opa-locka, Florida for spring training in 1948 and was assigned to the Springfield Sallies. But before she played one game for Springfield, she was traded to the Muskegon Lassies, who used her at second base. She then found herself on the move again, this time to the Grand Rapids Chicks late in the season.

Foss opened 1949 with the Rockford Peaches, who tried to turn her into a pitcher. In her new role, Foss pitched a couple of games before returning to Muskegon, where she threw in one game. She did not come back the next season.

In a 28-game career, Foss hit .117 (6-for-51) with a double and five stolen base, driving in five runs while scoring five times. As a pitcher, she hurled six innings in three games and did not have a decision.

Foss returned home after her baseball career ended. A few years later, she visited California and decided to move there. She then went to work for Douglas Aircraft Corporation, where she became the first female supervisor in her department. She retired in 1969 after 17 years of service for the company.

A long time resident of Santa Monica, California, Foss earned the Woman of the Year Award from Santa Monica YMCA in 2005 for her contributions to the community. An avid golfer, she also was appointed to the Rules Committee of the game.

The All-American Girls Professional Baseball League folded in 1954, but there is a permanent display at the Baseball Hall of Fame and Museum at Cooperstown, New York, since 1988 that honors those who were part of the league. Anita Foss, along with the rest of the girls and the league staff, is included at the display/exhibit.

Anita Foss died in 2015.
