= Kay Lionikas =

American professional baseball player from 1948

Kay Lionikis
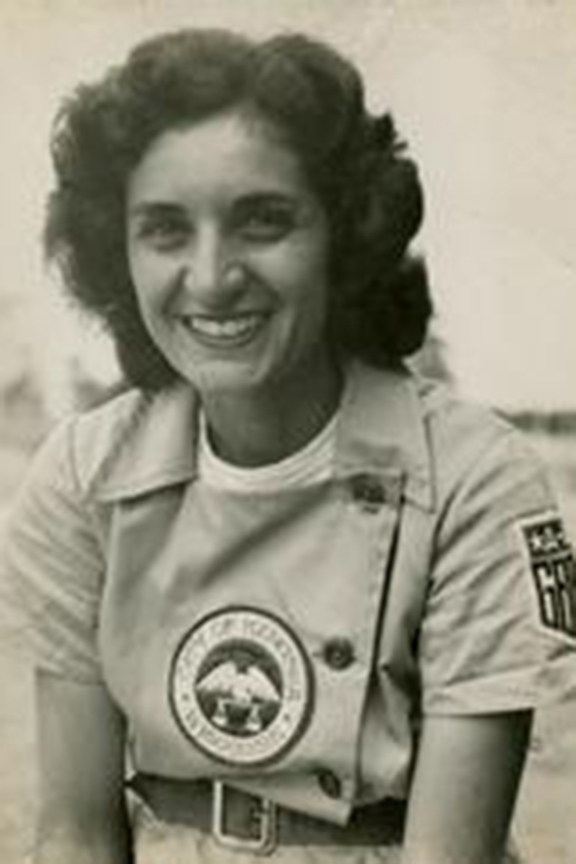
- Second base
- Born: November 5, 1923; New Brunswick, New Jersey, U.S.
- Died: August 7, 1978 (aged 54); New Brunswick, New Jersey, U.S.
- Batted: Right Threw: Right

Teams
- Kenosha Comets (1948); Peoria Redwings (1949); Grand Rapids Chicks (1949); Springfield Sallies (1949); Fort Wayne Daisies (1950)

Irene Kay Lionikis (November 5, 1923 – August 7, 1978) was an American professional baseball player from 1948 through 1950 in the All-American Girls Professional Baseball League (AAGPBL). She is sometimes credited as Kay Lionikas or Kay Lionikdas.

== Career ==
A native of New Brunswick, New Jersey born to Greek-American parents, Lionikis was one of three descendants of Greek immigrants to play in the All-American Girls Professional Baseball League, the others being Annastasia Batikis and Vickie Panos.

Lionikis joined the Kenosha Comets in 1948 as a pitcher. Lionikis went 0-for-4 at the plate in two games for the Grand Rapids Chicks and Peoria Redwings, playing at second base and pitching. She joined the Springfield Sallies in 1949, even though she did not appear in a game in that season. In 1950, she joined the Fort Wayne Daisies where she played second base.

After that, Lionikis played for a touring development team not involved in league play.

== Life after baseball ==
Lionikis was employed by Rutgers University as equipment manager for the Women's Athletic Department. Previously, she was employed by Rutgers University Library's Special Collections Division as a secretary.

Lionikis was a member of the Board of Trustees of the Rutgers Community Health Plan and the founding president of Rutgers University C.O.L.T.—an employees’ organization.

She was also a former New Brunswick Little League coach and played on champion tri-state basketball teams.

Lionikis died at the age of 54.

== See also ==
- List of Greek Americans

== Sources ==
- All-American Girls Professional Baseball League Record Book – W. C. Madden. Publisher: McFarland & Company. Format: Paperback, 294pp. Language: English. ISBN 0-7864-3747-2 ISBN 9780786437474
- "Irene Kay Lionikis". https://www.aagpbl.org/profiles/irene-kay-lionikis-the-greek/30. Retrieved 2021-11-30.
