= June Emerson =

Canadian baseball player

- Right field / First base
- Born: June 4, 1924; Moose Jaw, Saskatchewan, Canada
- Died: October 1, 1990 (aged 66); Moose Jaw, Saskatchewan, Canada
- Batted: Left Threw: Right

Teams
- Springfield Sallies (1948); Peoria Redwings (1949)

Career highlights and awards
- Women in Baseball – AAGPBL Permanent Display at the Baseball Hall of Fame and Museum (since 1988); Canadian Baseball Hall of Fame Honorary Induction (1998)

June Emerson (June 4, 1924 – October 1, 1990) was a Canadian baseball player who played in the All-American Girls Professional Baseball League (AAGPBL). Listed at 5' 5", 135 lb., Emerson batted left handed and threw right handed. She was nicknamed Venus.

Born in Moose Jaw, Saskatchewan, June Emerson was one of the 68 players born in Canada to join the AAGPBL in its twelve-year history.

Emerson worked as a reporter at the Toronto Star newspaper before joining the league with the Springfield Sallies in its 1948 season, then was dealt to the Peoria Redwings in 1949. During the offseason, she wrote for the newspaper and kept herself in good physical shape swimming and playing basketball.

In a two-season career, Emerson posted a batting average of .139 (26-for-159) with a .300 on-base percentage, driving in five runs and scoring 11 times, while hitting two doubles with seven stolen bases in 68 games.

Afterwards, Emerson served as a director of the Hyde Park YMCA in Chicago. In addition, she worked for an airline during 37 years.

Emerson died in 1990 in Saskatchewan, Canada, at the age of 66.

The All-American Girls Professional Baseball League folded in 1954, but there is a permanent display at the Baseball Hall of Fame and Museum at Cooperstown, New York, since November 5, 1988, that honors the entire league rather than any individual figure. In 1998, June Emerson and all Canadian AAGPBL players gained honorary induction into the Canadian Baseball Hall of Fame.
