= Isabel Álvarez =

Cuban baseball player (1933–2022)

- Pitcher / Outfielder
- Born: October 31, 1933; Havana, Cuba
- Died: June 6, 2022 (aged 88); Fort Wayne, Indiana, U.S.
- Batted: Left Threw: Left

debut
- 1949

Last appearance
- 1954

Teams
- Chicago Colleens (1949–'50); Fort Wayne Daisies (1951, 1954[end]); Battle Creek Belles (1951); Kalamazoo Lassies (1953); Grand Rapids Chicks (1954[start])

Career highlights and awards
- Playoff appearance (1954); Women in Baseball – AAGPBL Permanent Display at Baseball Hall of Fame and Museum (1988)

Isabel "Lefty" Álvarez (October 31, 1933 – June 6, 2022) was a Cuban pitcher and outfielder who played in the All-American Girls Professional Baseball League (AAGPBL) between the 1949 and 1954 seasons. She batted and threw left-handed.

Isabel Álvarez was the youngest Cuban player to join the All-American Girls Professional Baseball League, a women's circuit born during World War II and made famous in the 1992 film A League of Their Own.

== Early life ==
Álvarez was born and raised in Havana, Cuba, and learned to play baseball from a neighbor. At age 13, she joined the Estrellas Cubanas (Cuban Stars), an All-Star team modeled after the AAGPBL. The first AAGPBL spring training outside the United States was held in 1947 in Cuba, as part of a plan to create an International League of Girls Baseball.

From 1948 to 1949 seven Cubanas played in the AAGPBL: Isora del Castillo, Luisa Gallegos, Mirtha Marrero, Migdalia Pérez, Gloria Ruiz, Zonia Vialat and Álvarez. At the age of 15, she joined the league with the encouragement of her mother, who felt the United States offered better opportunities than Cuba did. Álvarez had difficulty communicating in her new country, but credited some teammates with helping her through the rough times.

== Career ==
Álvarez moved around for a while, as the AAGPBL shifted players as needed to help teams stay afloat. She entered the league in 1949 with the Chicago Colleens, playing for them two years before joining the Fort Wayne Daisies (1951) and then found herself on the move again, this time to the Battle Creek Belles (1951), and then the Kalamazoo Lassies (1953) and Grand Rapids Chicks (1954), before returning to the Daisies in the league's final year (1954).

Álvarez had three teammates in Chicago who were also from Cuba, and helped each other with the unfamiliar language and customs. When she moved to Fort Wayne, she had no one went without her Cuban teammates. Her most productive season came in 1950 with the Colleens, when she posted a 6–6 record and hit a career-high .256 in 12 games. She pitched 13 games with the Daisies in 1951, earning two wins and no losses with seven strikeouts and a 3.23 ERA in 39 innings of work. In 1953 she hit .195 for the Lassies, while collecting career-numbers in games (53), at-bats (123), runs batted in (12) and hits (24).

== Later life ==
By the time the league disbanded, she had become a U.S. citizen. Many years later, she returned to Cuba to visit her family and to try to locate some of the early AAGPBL players, in order to make a documentary titled Cuba on My Mind: The Baseball Journey of Isabel Alvarez. The film was made possible with support from the Indiana Humanities Council.

A longtime resident of Fort Wayne, she was an active reporter and columnist for Touching Bases, the AAGPBL Players Association newsletter, and as an AAGPBL and NEIBA member.

== Tributes and recognition ==
Álvarez is part of the AAGPBL permanent display at the Baseball Hall of Fame and Museum at Cooperstown, New York opened in 1988. She also was honored in 2008 with the Bob Parker Memorial Award, as well as with membership in the Northeast Indiana Baseball Association (NEIBA), for her decades of commitment to the sport of baseball. Then in 2011, she and her AAGPBL teammates from Cuba were honored by having their names and photos presented at a ceremony in New York City. The event was presented by Leslie Heaphy, history professor at Kent State University of Ohio, during the Cuban Baseball Congress held on August 20 at Fordham University.

The character of Esti González from the 2022 reboot series A League of Their Own based on the 1992 movie of the same name is partially based on Álvarez.

== Career statistics ==
Pitching

GP	W	L	W-L%	ERA	IP	H	RA	ER	BB	SO
13	2	0	1.000	3.71	34	41	29	14	26	7

Batting

GP	AB	R	H	2B	3B	HR	RBI	SB	BB	SO	BA	OBP
105	251	15	48	7	1	0	18	3	14	19	.195	.238

Fielding

GP	PO	A	E	TC	DP	FA
65	53	12	8	73	0	.890
