= Gertrude Alderfer =

- First base
- Born: September 21, 1931; Kulpsville, Pennsylvania, U.S.
- Died: February 27, 2018 (aged 86); East Greenville, Pennsylvania, U.S.
- Batted: Right Threw: Right

debut
- 1949, for the Springfield Sallies

Last appearance
- 1950, for the Kalamazoo Lassies

Career statistics
- Games played: 54
- At-bats: 212
- Hits: 50
- Batting average: .236

Teams
- Springfield Sallies (1949); Chicago Colleens (1950); Kalamazoo Lassies (1950)

Gertrude Alderfer [Gert] (September 21, 1931 – February 27, 2018) was a first basewoman and catcher who played from 1949 through 1950 in the All-American Girls Professional Baseball League (AAGPBL). She batted and threw right-handed.

== Early life ==
A native of Kulpsville, Pennsylvania, Alderfer was an all-around athlete who did play field hockey, basketball and softball in high school. She also played on a playground baseball team for two years in which she was the only girl among several boys. At age 17, she attended an AAGPBL tryout with about 200 girls in Allentown, Pennsylvania. Only nine of them made it to their destination, including Alderfer. She went to Chicago, Illinois for spring training after the night of her graduation. Most of her time in the AAGPBL was spent on the two touring training teams, the Springfield Sallies and Chicago Colleens, though she did stay with the Kalamazoo Lassies during five weeks in 1950.

== AAGPBL career ==
The Colleens and Sallies played exhibition games and recruited new talent as they toured through the South and East. Highlights of these tours included contests at Griffith Stadium in Washington, D.C., and Yankee Stadium in New York. Alderfer played for them in 1949 (Sallies) and 1950 (Colleens). She was drafted again by the Lassies after moving to Kalamazoo in 1951, but her mother took ill and she decided to stay home and care for her. Alderfer believed the toughest pitcher she faced was Doris Sams and the best player she saw in action was Dottie Schroeder. "Playing baseball and being paid for having fun was great. Also traveling to different cities and meeting a lot of different people. My teammates were the greatest.", she recalled.

Alderfer hit a .236 batting average in 54 games. Following her baseball career, she worked at Ameter, Inc., for over 40 years, retiring in 1993. She married in 1955 and changed her name to Gertrude Alderfer Benner. She and her husband raised their three children and had five grandchildren. The AAGPBL folded in 1954, but there is now a permanent display at the Baseball Hall of Fame and Museum at Cooperstown, New York, since November 5, 1988 that honors those who were part of this unique experience. Gertrude, along with the rest of the league's girls, is now enshrined in the Hall. She lived in East Greenville, Pennsylvania and died February 27, 2018.

== Career statistics ==
Batting

GP	AB	R	H	2B	3B	HR	RBI	SB	TB	BB	SO	BA	OBP	SLG
54	212	38	50	3	3	1	24	9	62	22	24	.236	.308	.292
