= Doris Cook =

American baseball player (1931–2025)

- Pitcher, outfield
- Born: June 23, 1931; Muskegon, Michigan, U.S.
- Died: September 3, 2025 (aged 94); Norton Shores, Michigan, U.S.
- Batted: Right Threw: Left

Teams
- Springfield Sallies (1949–1950); Kalamazoo Lassies (1951–1953); South Bend Blue Sox (1953)

Career highlights and awards
- Muskegon Area Sports Hall of Fame Inductee (1993); Women in Baseball – AAGPBL Permanent Display at Baseball Hall of Fame and Museum (1988)

Doris Cook (June 23, 1931 – September 3, 2025) was an American pitcher and outfielder who played from 1949 through 1953 in the All-American Girls Professional Baseball League (AAGPBL). Listed at 5 ft 1 in (1.55 m), 130 lb (59 kg), she batted right-handed and threw left-handed.

Cook joined the All-American Girls Professional Baseball League in 1949 at the age of 17, following in the footsteps of her older sister, Donna Cook, who played in the league from 1946 to 1954.

Born in Muskegon, Michigan, Doris was one of twelve children in the family of Sidney and Daisy (née Johnson) Cook. She played in a city softball league at age 14, before being scouted by the league under recommendation of her sister. She was signed to a contract and relocated to the Springfield Sallies rookie team, a traveling developmental squad of the AAGPBL, which entertained crowds across the country, playing exhibition games before Major League Baseball contests.

Cook won her first game as a pitcher on the tour, which started in Chicago and ended up in Canada. She played in Yankee Stadium and Griffith Stadium. We traded autographed balls with Tommy Henrich of the Yankees, she recalled in an interview. From 1949 to 1950, she posted a 6–11 record in 17 pitching appearances and batted a 137 average (10-for-73).

In 1951 Cook was promoted to the Kalamazoo Lassies, playing for them two and a half years before joining the South Bend Blue Sox during the 1953 midseason. Paired with her sister Donna in South Bend, for the first time in her professional career, she retired from the league following the 1953 season.

Cook went 0–1 with a 5.74 earned run average in 22 games pitched and played 74 games at left field, while collecting a .128 batting average. I was more of a defensive player than an offensive one, she explained.

Following her baseball career, Cook worked in banking for more than two decades before retiring in 1994. Since 1988 she is part of Women in Baseball, a permanent display based at the Baseball Hall of Fame and Museum in Cooperstown, New York, which was unveiled to honor the entire All-American Girls Professional Baseball League. She also was elected to the Muskegon Area Sports Hall of Fame along with her sister Donna in 1993. She lived in her hometown of Muskegon.

Cook died on September 3, 2025, at the age of 94.

== Career statistics ==
Pitching

GP	W	L	W-L%	ERA	IP	H	RA	ER	BB	SO
8	0	1	.000	5.74	22	19	16	14	39	5

Fielding

GP	PO	A	E	TC	DP	FA
82	147	7	7	161	0	.957

Batting

GP	AB	R	H	2B	3B	HR	RBI	SB	BB	SO	BA	OBP
109	250	19	32	1	0	0	14	1	29	33	.128	.219
