= Mary Baumgartner =

American baseball player (1930–2018)

- Catcher
- Born: September 13, 1930; Fort Wayne, Indiana, U.S.
- Died: June 2, 2018 (aged 87); Kendallville, Indiana, U.S.
- Batted: Right Threw: Right

debut
- 1949

Last appearance
- 1954

Teams
- Chicago Colleens (1949); Springfield Sallies (1949); Peoria Redwings (1949); South Bend Blue Sox (1950[start/end]); Kalamazoo Lassies (1950[mid]); South Bend Blue Sox (1951–1954)

Career highlights and awards
- All-Star Team (1953); Two-time Championship Team (1951–1952); Women in Baseball – AAGPBL Permanent Display Baseball Hall of Fame and Museum (1988)

Mary Baumgartner (September 13, 1930 – June 2, 2018) was an American professional baseball player who played as a catcher from 1949 through 1954 in the All-American Girls Professional Baseball League (AAGPBL). She batted and threw right-handed.

== Overview profile ==
Baumgartner, an All-Star and member of two champion teams, was a competent catcher during the last years of existence of the All-American Girls Professional Baseball League. Known more for her glove work than her bat, behind the plate is where she really shone. Defensively, Baumgartner was a solid receiver with a strong throwing arm who worked well with pitchers and was able to handle a running game. She also was adept at blocking balls in the dirt and catching errant pitches, important in a league that progressively expanded the length of the base paths and pitching distance and decreased the size of the ball until the final year of play. In six years of career, she committed only 59 errors in 1,128 total chances, for a significant fielding average of .950.

== Early life ==
A native of Fort Wayne, Indiana, Baumgartner was exposed to softball early in life as a batgirl, a job only youngsters dream about. She worked in a recreational softball league for the Zollner Pistons, whose factory was across the street from where she lived. In 1943, when she was a sophomore in high school, the Fort Wayne Daisies local team debuted in the All-American Girls league. She watched them play and decided she could play after school graduation. Finally, she attended an invitation to a tryout in 1949.

== AAGPBL career ==
In 1949 the AAGPBL held its spring training at Opa-locka, Florida. Baumgartner trained with the Daisies and later was sent to Chicago for a tryout to go on touring teams. She divided her playing time between the Chicago Colleens and Springfield Sallies, touring Midwest to Texas and Oklahoma to Florida, Tennessee, Louisiana, Missouri, Mississippi, Alabama and Arkansas, a unique experience for a young girl away from home for the first time. In July, she was promoted to the Peoria Redwings. She appeared in 15 games with Peoria and went 2-for-22 for a .091 average, including a double and two runs scored.

But Baumgartner moved around for a while, as the league shifted players as needed to help teams stay afloat. She started the 1950 spring training with the Kalamazoo Lassies, being traded to the South Bend Blue Sox at the start of the regular season. Then during the midseason was loaned to Kalamazoo for one month and rejoined the Blue Sox to finish the season. She hit a combined .176 (13-for-74) in 36 games, before staying with South Bend for the rest of her career.

In limited action, Baumgartner hit .205 (9-for-44) in 1951 and .100 (5-for-50) in 1952. In both seasons, South Bend reached the playoffs and captured the Championship Title.

After three undistinguished years as part-time catcher Baumgartner finally emerged in 1953. She appeared in a career-high 90 games, hit .187 (49-for-262) with eight doubles, 49 runs and 38 RBI, and earned an All-Star Team berth.

During what turned out to be the league's final season, Baumgartner hit .186 (42-for-226) in 81 games, including five doubles, 42 runs and career-numbers with four home runs and 12 stolen bases.

== Statistics ==
=== Batting ===
GP	AB	R	H	2B	3B	HR	RBI	SB	BB	SO	BA	OBP	SLG
280	678	67	120	16	1	4	49	24	116	132	.177	.297	.221

=== Fielding ===
GP	PO	A	E	TC	DP	FA
277	890	179	59	1128	18	.948

== Life after baseball ==
Baumgartner had begun college in 1953. After graduating in physical education, she taught and coached high school for 28 years, specializing in track and field, basketball, gymnastics, softball and volleyball. She also played at third base for the South Bend Rockettes, and later started to play and compete in golf tournaments. In 1988, she attended to the opening of a permanent display at the Baseball Hall of Fame and Museum in Cooperstown, New York, that honors those who were part of the All-American Girls Professional Baseball League. She later was named president of the AAGPBL Players Association, which was created in 1987 under the guidance of former league's pitcher June Peppas. The association was largely responsible for the opening of the league's exhibition in Cooperstown. Baumgartner lived in Fremont, Indiana and died June 2, 2018, in Kendallville, Indiana.
