= Lillian Shadic =

American baseball player

- Center fielder
- Born: June 14, 1929; Chatham, New York, U.S.
- Died: June 27, 2017 (aged 88); Albany, New York, U.S.
- Batted: Right Threw: Right

Teams
- Springfield Sallies (1949)

Lillian Shadic [Campbell] (June 14, 1929 – June 27, 2017) was an All-American Girls Professional Baseball League center fielder. Listed at 5' 5", 145 lb., she batted and threw right handed.

Lillian Shadic played one season barnstorming in the All-American League.

Born in Chatham, New York, Shadic was dubbed Pete as a child and she retained this nickname for the rest of her life. She was a graduate of the Roeliff Jansen High School in Craryville, New York, where she played basketball and softball before answering a press advertisement about the league.

Pete did not just excel at softball, but she was even part of the Roe Jan, a local boys baseball team. She then went to a tryout in New Jersey and received an offer to play in the league during the 1949 season. Never having travelled, she decided to join one of the travelling teams and was assigned to the Springfield Sallies, as they toured in twenty-six states, including exhibition contests at Griffith Stadium and Yankee Stadium. While no official statistics were kept by the league, she was credited with hitting two home runs in a single game.

Afterwards, Lillian returned home and married Clifford H. Campbell Sr. in 1950. They raised seven children and she assisted him on the family dairy farm until 1988. In her spare time, she played softball, basketball and bowling, while coaching her sons in little league baseball and her daughters in softball. Shadic also did volunteer work at Taconic Hills High School and drove the school bus for seventeen years. There is a plaque near the school softball honoring her.

In 1988, a permanent display was inaugurated at the Baseball Hall of Fame and Museum at Cooperstown, New York, that honors those who were part of the All-American Girls Professional Baseball League. The lively Pete, along with the rest of the girls and the league staff, is included at the display/exhibit.

Lillian Shadic died in 2017 in Albany, New York following a brief illness, just 13 days after her 88th birthday.
