= Beverly Dustrude =

American baseball player

- Second base
- Born: October 24, 1926; Beloit, Wisconsin, U.S.
- Died: December 1, 2008 (aged 82); Oxnard, California, U.S.
- Batted: Right Threw: Right

Teams
- Rockford Peaches (1947); Springfield Sallies (1949)

Beverly "Dusty" Dustrude (later Roberson; October 24, 1926 – December 1, 2008) was an American second basewoman who played in the All-American Girls Professional Baseball League (AAGPBL). She batted and threw right-handed.

Born in Beloit, Wisconsin, Dustrude joined the Rockford Peaches in time to travel to Cuba for the AAGPBL spring training in 1947. She was used sparingly and did not return for the 1948 season. In 1949, Dustrude formed part of the Springfield Sallies, who had joined the Chicago Colleens as touring player development teams for the league. She only played in ten games altogether. In addition to softball and baseball, Dustrude participated in golf and bowling.

Dustrude was a longtime resident of Oxnard, California, where she died at the age of 82.

She is part of Women in Baseball, a permanent display based at the Baseball Hall of Fame and Museum in Cooperstown, New York. The exhibition was unveiled on November 5, 1988, to honor the entire All-American Girls Professional Baseball League rather than individual baseball personalities.
