= Renae Youngberg =

- Third base
- Born: April 3, 1933; Waukegan, Illinois, U.S.
- Died: January 10, 2015 (aged 81); Maggie Valley, North Carolina, U.S.
- Batted: Right Threw: Right

Teams
- Springfield Sallies (1949); Grand Rapids Chicks (1951–1952); South Bend Blue Sox (1953); Muskegon Lassies (1953); Grand Rapids Chicks (1953–1954)

Renae Audrey Youngberg [Ray] (April 3, 1933 – January 10, 2015) was a third basewoman who played in the All-American Girls Professional Baseball League (AAGPBL) during four seasons spanning 1949–1954. She batted and threw right-handed.

== Early life ==
Born in Waukegan, Illinois, Renae Youngberg grew up in the years before Little League Baseball allowed girls to play, and she had to play sandlot ball with the neighborhood kids. Youngberg attended Waukegan Township High School. There no were no sports available there for girls, but she was actively involved in intramural sports, playing basketball, field hockey, volleyball, and softball. Outside of school, she played industrial league basketball, bowling, and independent softball and baseball. Following her graduation, she earned a scholarship to attend Illinois State Normal University.

== AAGPBL career ==
The Chicago Colleens and the Springfield Sallies joined the AAGPBL as expansion teams in 1948. Both teams were the worst of the league and lost their franchises by the end of that season. From 1949 through 1950, the Colleens and Sallies became rookie development teams that played exclusively exhibition games. At age 17, Youngberg joined the 1949 tour as third sacker for Springfield. During sixty-six days, she spent her time playing an itinerary of thirty-one tour cities.

Youngberg did not play in 1950 because she had to spend six months in a sanatorium with a confirmed case of tuberculosis. She received permission to return to the league in 1951 and joined the roster of the Grand Rapids Chicks. She hit .201 (68-for-338) with 26 runs and 31 RBI in a career-high 98 games.

In 1952, Youngberg dropped to a .167 average in 86 games, but played solid defense at third while she was in the game. She split time with the South Bend Blue Sox and Muskegon Lassies in 1953, returning to the Chicks late in the year to be a part of the Championship team. That year, she finished with a combined .222 average in 72 games. Her best season at the plate came in 1954 with Grand Rapids, when she hit a career-high .270 average with eight home runs in 72 games, driving in 50 runs while scoring 50 times.

== Life after baseball ==
Following her baseball career, Youngberg went on to earn a physical education degree from Illinois State University in 1955. She also earned a master's degree in counseling in 1961, and spent 30 years as a teacher and 15 coaching in the Kalamazoo Public Schools. She stayed active athletically by playing softball, basketball, volleyball and also golfed and bowled.

Since 1988, Youngberg is part of Women in Baseball, a permanent display based at the Baseball Hall of Fame and Museum in Cooperstown, New York, which was unveiled to honor the entire All-American Girls Professional Baseball League rather than individual baseball personalities.

Following her retirement, Youngberg divided her time between a lake home in Portage, Michigan and a mobile home in Placida, Florida. She died in January 2015 in Maggie Valley, North Carolina, at the age of 81.

== Career statistics ==
Batting

GP	AB	R	H	2B	3B	HR	RBI	SB	BB	SO	BA	OBP
341	1141	127	244	28	5	8	123	36	124	79	.214	.291

Fielding

GP	PO	A	E	TC	DP	FA
338	381	765	97	1243	49	.922
