= Betty Fountain =

American baseball player

- Born: January 10, 1930; Rome, Georgia, U.S.
- Died: November 2, 2015 (aged 85); Rome, Georgia, U.S.

Teams
- Springfield Sallies (1949)

Career highlights and awards
- Women in Baseball – AAGPBL Permanent Display at the Baseball Hall of Fame and Museum (unveiled in 1988)

Betty Fountain (January 10, 1930 – November 2, 2015) was an All-American Girls Professional Baseball League player.

Born in Rome, Georgia, Betty Fountain joined the league in its 1949 season and was assigned to the Springfield Sallies touring team. Additional information is incomplete because there are no records available at the time of the request.

After leaving the league she joined the Women's Army Corps and served as a surgical technician in Okinawa during the Korean War. She then moved to Chicago with an army friend, and found work as a professional artist at Richard Rush Studios, where she met her husband Muneyoshi Yamakuchi. They married on October 7, 1967, and she became Betty Fountain Yamakuchi. She coached little league baseball for decades afterward at Hamlin Park in Chicago, while running a commercial art studio and raising a family.

In 2001 she returned to live in Rome, Georgia and subsequently published a book of art and poetry "Home Again". She died November 2, 2015, from complications of Alzheimers.

In 1988 was inaugurated a permanent display at the Baseball Hall of Fame and Museum at Cooperstown, New York, that honors those who were part of the All-American Girls Professional Baseball League. Betty Fountain, along with the rest of the girls and the league staff, is included at the display/exhibit.
