= Audrey Deemer =

- Infielder/Pitcher
- Born: September 28, 1930; Steubenville, Ohio, U.S.
- Died: September 25, 2012 (aged 81); Cadiz, Ohio, U.S.
- Batted: Right Threw: Right

Teams
- Chicago Colleens (1950); Fort Wayne Daisies (1950); Springfield Sallies (1950)

Career highlights and awards
- Women in Baseball – AAGPBL Permanent Display at Baseball Hall of Fame and Museum (1988)

Audrey Jene Deemer (September 28, 1930 – September 25, 2012) was an American utility infielder and pitcher for the Chicago Colleens, Fort Wayne Daisies, and Springfield Sallies of the All-American Girls Professional Baseball League (AAGPBL) in 1950. She played in 25 games, hitting .106 with nine hits, 14 runs scored, and six stolen bases.

== Personal life ==
She was born in Steubenville, Ohio. Following her playing career, she worked as a police dispatcher for the Powhatan Point Police Department of Powhatan Point, Ohio. She died in Cadiz, Ohio, three days before her 82nd birthday.

== Career statistics ==
Batting

| GP | AB | R | H | 2B | 3B | HR | RBI | SB | TB | BB | SO | BA | OBP | SLG | OPS |
|---|---|---|---|---|---|---|---|---|---|---|---|---|---|---|---|
| 25 | 85 | 14 | 9 | 0 | 1 | 0 | 8 | 6 | 11 | 11 | 16 | .106 | .208 | .129 | .338 |
