= Julie Gutz =

American baseball player (1926–2021)

- Catcher
- Born: December 4, 1926; Storm Lake, Iowa, U.S.
- Died: April 26, 2021 (aged 94); Murrieta, California, U.S.
- Batted: Right Threw: Right

Teams
- Springfield Sallies (1948); Muskegon Lassies (1949); Kenosha Comets (1950)

Career highlights and awards
- Women in Baseball – AAGPBL Permanent Display at the Baseball Hall of Fame and Museum (since 1988)

Julie Kathleen Gutz (December 4, 1926 – April 26, 2021) was an American baseball catcher who played in the All-American Girls Professional Baseball League (AAGPBL). Listed at 5' 5", 155 lb., Gutz batted and threw right handed. She was dubbed 'Gutzie' by her teammates.

Born in Storm Lake, Iowa, Julie Gutz caught for three seasons from 1948 through 1950, starting with the Springfield Sallies and Muskegon Lassies before ending her career with the Kenosha Comets.

While she was a light-hitting catcher, Gutz provided solid defense with a strong throwing arm and showed notable durability. During one stretch, she caught in 110 consecutive games and never missed an inning. Her most productive season came in 1950, when she hit .203 in 112 games.

In a 235-game career, Gutz posted an average of .175 (124-for-709) with 13 doubles, five triples and one home run, stealing 14 bases and scoring 62 runs while driving in another 44.

As a catcher, she recorded 846 putouts with 238 assists and turned 20 double plays, committing 55 errors in 1,139 total chances for a .952 fielding average.

Afterwards, Gutz worked as an electronics technician at Honeywell and later managed a resort in Kabetogama, Minnesota.

In 1988 was unveiled a permanent display at the Baseball Hall of Fame and Museum at Cooperstown, New York, that honors those who were part of the All-American Girls Professional Baseball League. Julie Gutz is included at the display/exhibit. Gutz would consult on the 1992 film A League of Their Own, which was about the AAGPBL.

Gutz died in Murrieta, California in April 2021, at the age of 94.

== Career statistics ==
Batting

GP	AB	R	H	2B	3B	HR	RBI	SB	TB	BB	SO	BA	OBP	SLG	OPS
235	709	62	124	13	5	1	44	14	150	63	94	.175	.242	.212	.454

Fielding

GP	PO	A	E	TC	DP	FA
234	846	238	55	1139	24	.952
