= Norene Arnold =

American baseball player

- Pitcher / Infield Utility
- Born: November 21, 1927; Oregon, Illinois, U.S.
- Died: January 27, 1987 (aged 59); Fresno, California, U.S.
- Batted: Right Threw: Right

Teams
- Muskegon Lassies (1949); Springfield Sallies (1949)

Career highlights and awards
- Women in Baseball – AAGPBL Permanent Display at Baseball Hall of Fame and Museum (1988)

Florence Norene Arnold [Witzel] (November 21, 1927 – January 27, 1987) was a right-handed pitcher and utility infielder who played in the All-American Girls Professional Baseball League (AAGPBL) in its 1949 season. She was dubbed 'Blondie'.

Born in Oregon, Illinois, Norene Arnold spent a season in the league with the Springfield Sallies travelling team and the Muskegon Lassies. No statistics were kept by the Sallies in 1949 and she likely played less than 10 games with the Lassies.
