= Alice DeCambra =

American baseball player (1921–1988)

- Infielder/Pitcher
- Born: August 18, 1921; Somerset, Massachusetts, U.S.
- Died: June 19, 1988 (aged 66); Somerset, Massachusetts, U.S.
- Batted: Right Threw: Right

Teams
- Fort Wayne Daisies (1946–1947); Peoria Redwings (1947–1950); Kalamazoo Lassies (1950)

Career highlights and awards
- Tied for the best season fielding average at second base (1948); Postseason appearance (1948); Women in Baseball – AAGPBL Permanent Display at Baseball Hall of Fame and Museum (1988)

Alice G. DeCambra (August 18, 1921 – June 19, 1988) was an American infielder and pitcher who played from 1946 through 1950 in the All-American Girls Professional Baseball League (AAGPBL). Listed at 5 ft 3 in (1.60 m), 126 lb., DeCambra batted and threw right-handed. She was dubbed Moose. Her younger sister, Lillian DeCambra, joined the league in 1947.

Alice DeCambra was a versatile player during her five years in the All-American Girls Professional Baseball League. She provided a solid defense at second base, juggling positions on the field as a pitcher and at shortstop. In 1948 she tied with Kenosha Comets' Elizabeth Fabac for the best fielding average at second base (.963). She was also a smart baserunner, averaging at least 21 stolen bases per season while collecting a .198 average and a .263 on-base percentage.

A native of Somerset, Massachusetts, DeCambra was one of ten children who grew up in a household devoted to athletic activity. She excelled in baseball, while playing for the St. Patrick's Rhode Island All-Stars before joining the league in 1946.

DeCambra pitched for the Fort Wayne Daisies and the Peoria Redwings during her first two years in the league and then was used strictly as an infielder. She joined her sister, Lillian, with the Daisies during the 1947 spring training held at Havana, Cuba. The younger sister played in exhibition training games but never appeared in a regular season game.

DeCambra played for Peoria through 1950, when she was traded to the Kalamazoo Lassies during the midseason. In that year, she posted a career-high .244 average in just 69 games.

During her playing career, DeCambra worked for Firestone Tire and Rubber Company in the off-season. After her baseball days, she continued to work at Firestone for a long time. Besides, in her spare time she enjoyed playing basketball, bowling and swimming.

Alice DeCambra died in her homeland of Somerset, Massachusetts at the age of 66. In November 1988, five months after her death, she became part of Women in Baseball, a permanent display based at the Baseball Hall of Fame and Museum in Cooperstown, New York, which was unveiled to honor the entire All-American Girls Professional Baseball League rather than individual baseball personalities.

== Career statistics ==
Batting

GP	AB	R	H	2B	3B	HR	RBI	SB	TB	BB	SO	BA	OBP	SLG
490	1578	152	313	29	6	0	105	107	354	138	76	.198	.263	.224

Fielding

GP	PO	A	E	TC	DP	FA
437	926	764	110	1800	90	.939

Pitching

GP	W	L	W-L%	ERA	IP	H	RA	ER	BB	SO	WHIP
31	11	8	.579	3.38	165	154	81	62	36	26	1.15
