= Lillian DeCambra =

American baseball player (1925–2003)

- Infield Utility
- Born: November 21, 1925; Somerset, Massachusetts, U.S.
- Died: October 1, 2003 (aged 77); Somerset, Massachusetts, U.S.
- Batted: Right Threw: Right

Teams
- Fort Wayne Daisies (1947)

Career highlights and awards
- Women in Baseball – AAGPBL Permanent Display at Baseball Hall of Fame and Museum (since 1988)

Lillian DeCambra (November 21, 1925 – October 1, 2003) was an American infielder who played in the All-American Girls Professional Baseball League (AAGPBL). Listed at 5' 2", 102 lb., DeCambra batted and threw right handed. Her eldest sister, Alice DeCambra, also played in the league.

Born in Somerset, Massachusetts, DeCambra played basketball and ice skating at a young age, and later she showed her interest in softball. She was assigned to the Fort Wayne Daisies in 1947, but never played a regular season game.

Lillian joined her sister Alice at spring training games held at Havana, Cuba. Afterwards, she played in exhibition games with the Daisies before the start of the season.

The AAGPBL folded in 1954, but there is a permanent display at the Baseball Hall of Fame and Museum at Cooperstown, New York, since November 5, 1988, that honors the entire league rather than any individual figure.

Lillian DeCambra died in 2003 in Somerset, Massachusetts, at the age of 77.
