= Betty Degner =

American baseball player

- Pitcher
- Born: Amboy, Illinois, U.S.
- Bats: Right Throws: Right

Teams
- Muskegon Lassies (1949); Springfield Sallies (1949)

Career highlights and awards
- Women in Baseball – AAGPBL Permanent Display at Baseball Hall of Fame and Museum (since 1988)

Betty Degner (December 27, 1930 - July 30, 1993) was an All-American Girls Professional Baseball League player.

Degner enjoyed little success in the league as she appeared in just two games in its 1949 season. She was signed as a pitcher and was added to the Muskegon Lassies roster, then was traded to the Springfield Sallies during the midseason.

Degner posted a batting average of .200 (1-for-5) but did not receive credit for a win or a loss.

The All-American Girls Professional Baseball League folded in 1954, but there is a permanent display at the Baseball Hall of Fame and Museum at Cooperstown, New York, since November 5, 1988, that honors the entire league rather than any individual figure.
