= Mitch Skupien =

All-American Girls Professional Baseball League
- Manager
- Bats: n/a Throws: n/a

Career statistics
- Games: 415
- Wins: 221
- Losses: 194
- W-L%: .533

Teams
- Grand Rapids Chicks (1951); Kalamazoo Lassies (1952–'54)

Career highlights and awards
- Championship Title (1954); Three playoff appearances (1951, 1953-'54)

Mitch Skupien was a manager and executive in the All-American Girls Professional Baseball League (AAGPBL).

Very little is known about this man who worked hard for the AAGPBL during the final five years of its existence. Previously, Skupien had managed the Rayson Sporting Goods, a Chicago baseball team, and also had served as a scout for the AAGPBL since the early years of the circuit. He reported to the board of directors in 1949 and later managed during four years, leading his teams to three playoff appearances, including the Championship title in the league's last season.

Skupien took the field in 1951 with the Grand Rapids Chicks, managing for them one year before joining the Kalamazoo Lassies (1952–1954). In his first season, Skupien led Grand Rapids to the first-half title with a 40–13 record and posted the second-best record at 71–35 (in an eight-team format), earning a ticket to the playoffs. But the Chicks lost the first round to the Rockford Peaches, two games to none.

He landed in Kalamazoo in 1952 in an attempt to revive the struggling Lassies franchise, which had losing records in four of their six previous seasons. With him at the helm, the team improved to 49-60 and finished fifth (next to last), after collecting a second-worst 34-75 the previous year.

In 1953, the Lassies finished third with a 53–50 record and advanced to the playoffs. After defeating the Fort Wayne Daisies in the first round (2–1), Kalamazoo was beaten by Grand Rapids in the final series (2-to-1).

The Lassies had a 48–49 mark in 1954 and finished fifth out of six teams. In the playoffs, Kalamazoo defeated the South Bend Blue Sox in three games, and later disposed of the strong Daisies (3-2) to clinch the last Championship title in the league's history.

In addition to his work as a skipper, from 1949 to 1950 Skupien was kept busy as a general manager for the Chicago Colleens and Springfield Sallies touring teams. For the next two years, the Colleens and Sallies recruited new talent for the league, while playing an extensive exhibition schedule against each other through the South and East, including contests at Griffith Stadium in Washington, D.C., and Yankee Stadium in New York City. Patricia Barringer, who had played at second base in the AAGPBL, was named by Skupien as chaperone and manager of the Colleens, who wore green uniforms, while another former second bagger, Barbara Liebrich, became the chaperone-manager for the Sallies, who wore white uniforms.

Mitch Skupien is part of the AAGPBL permanent display at the Baseball Hall of Fame and Museum at Cooperstown, New York, opened in 1988, which is dedicated to the entire league rather than any individual figure.
