= Barbara Liebrich =

- Second base / Manager / Chaperone
- Born: September 30, 1922; Providence, Rhode Island, U.S.
- Died: July 17, 2006 (aged 83); Port Charlotte, Florida, U.S.
- Batted: Right Threw: Right

debut
- 1948

Last appearance
- 1954

Teams
- Rockford Peaches (1948) (player); Kenosha Comets (1948) (player); Springfield Sallies (1949–1950) (Chap/Mgr); Kalamazoo Lassies (1951–1954) (Chap); Chap=Chaperone, Mgr=Manager

Career highlights and awards
- All-Star team (1954); Championship team (1954)

Barbara E. Liebrich [Bobbie] (September 30, 1922 – July 17, 2006) was an American infielder, manager and chaperone in the All-American Girls Professional Baseball League (AAGPBL) during the 1948 and 1954 seasons. She batted and threw right-handed.

The diligent and dedicated Barbara Liebrich gave seven years of good service in the All-American Girls Professional League through different facets. Liebrich did not get much playing time, but she became a manager of one of the traveling teams and also served as a chaperone.

== Early life ==
Born in Providence, Rhode Island, Liebrich was the second girl of four children into the family of George and Lillian (Leicht) Liebrich. As a child, she grew up in a baseball household as her father was a semi-professional pitcher for many years, although she began playing softball with the Hudson Motor Car Company team after high school graduation in 1940, appearing in national tournaments in Detroit in 1941 and 1943.

== AAGPBL career ==
A late bloomer, Liebrich did not start playing professionally until she joined the AAGPBL as a rookie 25-year-old in 1948. She spent the year with the Rockford Peaches and the Kenosha Comets, but did not get much playing time, batting a .250 average in three games as a replacement at second base.

Liebrich became a chaperone for the expansion Springfield Sallies in 1948. The team, managed by Carson Bigbee, finished in last place with a 41–84 record, 35 and a half games behind the Racine Belles in the Western Division. In 1949, the Sallies joined the Chicago Colleens as touring player development teams, while Leibrich replaced Bigbee as the team's manager.

From 1951 through 1954 Liebrich worked as a chaperone for the Kalamazoo Lassies. In 1954, she was selected chaperone for the All-Star team and also was a member of the champion Lassies, managed by Mitch Skupien, during what turned out to be the league's final season.

== Life after baseball ==
Following her baseball career, Liebrich became the chief accountant for a large manufacturing firm. Since 1988 she is part of Women in Baseball, a permanent display based at the Baseball Hall of Fame and Museum in Cooperstown, New York, which was unveiled to honor the entire All-American Girls Professional Baseball League rather than individual baseball personalities.

Liebrich was a longtime resident of Port Charlotte, Florida, where she died at the age of 83.
