= Luisa Gallegos =

Cuban baseball player

- Pitcher / Third base
- Born: April 12, 1929 (age 97); Havana, Cuba
- Bats: Right Throws: Right
- Stats at Baseball Reference

Teams
- Peoria Redwings (1948); South Bend Blue Sox (1948)

Career highlights and awards
- Cuban Sports Hall of Fame (2010)

Luisa Gallegos (born April 12, 1929) is a former pitcher and infielder who played in the All-American Girls Professional Baseball League (AAGPBL) in the 1947 season. She batted and threw right handed.

Born in Havana, Luisa Gallegos was one of seven girls born in Cuba to play in the All-American Girls Professional Baseball League in its twelve years history. She began playing at age 12 with the boys at her neighborhood park, until her playground skills took her to play organized baseball with the Cubaneleco Club managed by Alfredo Rodríguez.

Besides Gallegos, other Cubanas who played in the AAGPBL were Isabel Alvarez, Isora del Castillo, Mirtha Marrero, Migdalia Pérez, Gloria Ruiz and Zonia Vialat. All of them debuted in 1948. The next year, Isora del Castillo and Isabel Alvarez were added.

Gallegos was assigned to the Peoria Redwings, playing for them the first half of the season before joining the South Bend Blue Sox. She opened at third base and later was used as a spot starter.

In 1988, Gallegos and the other Cuban girls were honored during the opening of Women in Baseball, a permanent display based at the Baseball Hall of Fame and Museum in Cooperstown, New York, which was unveiled to honor the entire All-American Girls Professional Baseball League. Another tribute to the AAGPBL players came with the 1992 film A League of Their Own, featuring Tom Hanks, Geena Davis and Madonna, and directed by filmmaker Penny Marshall.

Gallegos also gained induction into the Cuban Sports Hall of Fame in 2010. The next year, she and her AAGPBL teammates from Cuba were honored by having their names and photos presented at a ceremony in New York City. The event was presented by Leslie Heaphy, history professor at Kent State University of Ohio, during the Cuban Baseball Congress held on August 20 at Fordham University. As of 2011 Gallegos lives in Miami, Florida.

== Career statistics ==
Pitching

GP	W	L	W-L%	ERA	IP	H	RA	ER	BB	SO
16	2	6	.250	5.79	73	46	55	47	76	37

Batting

GP	AB	R	H	2B	3B	HR	RBI	SB	BB	SO	BA	OBP	SLG	OPS
29	36	3	3	0	0	0	1	2	2	11	.083	.132	.083	.215
