= Mirtha Marrero =

- Pitcher
- Born: November 21, 1930; Havana, Cuba
- Died: March 31, 2023 (aged 92)
- Batted: Right Threw: Right

Teams
- Chicago Colleens (1948–1949); Kalamazoo Lassies (1950); Fort Wayne Daisies (1951); Battle Creek Belles (1952)

Career highlights and awards
- Cuban Sports Hall of Fame (2010)

Mirtha Marrero [Fernández] (November 21, 1930 – March 31, 2021) was a Cuban born former pitcher who played from 1948 through 1953 in the All-American Girls Professional Baseball League (AAGPBL). She batted and threw right handed.

== Career ==
Born in Havana, Mirtha Marrero was one of seven women born in Cuba to play in the All-American Girls Professional Baseball League in its twelve years history. Besides her, other Cubanas who played in the league were Luisa Gallegos, Migdalia Pérez, Gloria Ruiz and Zonia Vialat. All of them debuted in 1948. The next year, Isora del Castillo and Isabel Alvarez were added.

Nicknamed ״Mita״, Marrero became an instant favorite among her fellow players, who described her as a lively, intense and energetic. She entered the league with the Chicago Colleens, playing for them two years before joining the Kalamazoo Lassies (1950), Fort Wayne Daisies (1951) and Battle Creek Belles (1952). Marrero had a 32–62 career record, even though she collected a solid 3.42 earned run average. She quit baseball when she got married because her husband did not want her playing.

Her most productive season in 1951 with Fort Wayne, when she posted a 17–8 record and a 2.24 ERA in 29 pitching appearances, while ending fourth in the league for the most wins, fifth in innings pitched (213) and seventh in strikeouts (87), tying for fourth in games and eighth in complete games (20).

In 1988, Mirtha and the other Cuban women were honored during the opening of Women in Baseball, a permanent display based at the Baseball Hall of Fame and Museum in Cooperstown, New York, which was unveiled to honor the entire All-American Girls Professional Baseball League.

Another tribute to the AAGPBL players came with the 1992 film A League of Their Own, featuring Tom Hanks, Geena Davis and Madonna, and directed by filmmaker Penny Marshall.

In 2010, Mirtha gained induction into the Cuban Sports Hall of Fame. The next year, she and her AAGPBL teammates from Cuba were honored by having their names and photos presented at a ceremony in New York City. The event was presented by Leslie Heaphy, history professor at Kent State University of Ohio, during the Cuban Baseball Congress held on August 20 at Fordham University. She then lived in Miami, Florida.

== Career statistics ==
Pitching

GP	W	L	W-L%	ERA	IP	H	RA	ER	BB	SO
119	32	62	.340	3.42	774	693	437	294	396	252

Batting

GP	AB	R	H	2B	3B	HR	RBI	SB	BB	SO	BA	OBP
125	267	21	51	10	0	0	13	1	33	53	.191	.280

Fielding

GP	PO	A	E	TC	FA
119	40	222	34	296	.885
