= Barbara Hines (disambiguation) =

Barbara Hines is an American artist.

Barbara Hines may also refer to:

- Barbara Hines (baseball), All-American Girls Professional Baseball League ballplayer
- Barbara Hines (lawyer), American immigration attorney
