= List of All-American Girls Professional Baseball League managers =

The following is a list of managers who formed part of the All-American Girls Professional Baseball League (AAGPBL) during its twelve years of existence, from its inception in 1943 through the 1954 season.

This list presents data from an eight-year collaborative research project commanded by the AAGPBL Players' Association and is considered to be the definitive list of all the known managers that ever formed part of the league.

Bill Allington became the most successful manager in league history. He never had a losing season, while setting all-time records for the most championships titles (four, 1945 and 1948–1950), postseason appearances (nine, 1945–1946, 1948–1954), as well as regular season victories (583) and winning percentage (.594).

Some information is not available and is subject to future additions and eventual improvement.

Manager	Team(s)	Year(s)	Championship	Ref
Eddie Ainsmith	Rockford Peaches	1947		
Bill Allington	Rockford Peaches; Fort Wayne Daisies	1944–1946; 1948–1954	1945; 1948, 1949, 1950	
Mary Baker	Kalamazoo Lassies	1950		
Dave Bancroft	Chicago Colleens; South Bend Blue Sox; Battle Creek Belles	1948; 1949–1950; 1951		
Patricia Barringer	Chicago Colleens	1949–1950		
Dick Bass	Fort Wayne Daisies	1948		
Carson Bigbee	Springfield Sallies; Muskegon Lassies	1948; 1949		
Josh Billings	Kenosha Comets	1943–1944		
Buzz Boyle	Muskegon Lassies	1946		
Guy Bush	Battle Creek Belles	1951–1952		
Mary Carey	Peoria Redwings	1950		
Max Carey	Milwaukee Chicks; Fort Wayne Daisies	1944; 1950–1951	1944	
Joe Cooper	Battle Creek Belles; Muskegon Belles	1952; 1953		
Press Cruthers	Kenosha Comets	1946		
Norm Derringer	Racine Belles	1950		
Bill Edwards	Rockford Peaches	1947		
Thelma Eisen	Peoria Redwings	1946		
Woody English	Grand Rapids Chicks	1952–1954	1953	
Jimmie Foxx	Fort Wayne Daisies	1952		
Johnny Gottselig	Racine Belles; Peoria Redwings; Kenosha Comets	1943–1944; 1947; 1949–1951	1943	
Chet Grant	South Bend Blue Sox; Kenosha Comets	1946–1947; 1948		
Harold Greiner	Fort Wayne Daisies	1949		
George Johnson	Fort Wayne Daisies	1947		
Bubber Jonnard	Minneapolis Millerettes	1944		
Vivian Kellogg	Fort Wayne Daisies	1949		
Jack Kloza	Rockford Peaches	1944		
Barbara Liebrich	Springfield Sallies	1949–1950		
Marty McManus	Kenosha Comets; South Bend Blue Sox	1944; 1945, 1948		
Benny Meyer	Grand Rapids Chicks	1945		
Leo Murphy	Racine Belles	1945–1948	1946	
Bert Niehoff	South Bend Blue Sox	1943–1944		
Ernestine Petras	Kenosha Comets	1950		
Johnny Rawlings	Grand Rapids Chicks; Rockford Peaches	1946–1950; 1953–1954	1947	
Mary Reynolds	Peoria Redwings	1950		
Bill Rodgers	Peoria Redwings	1946		
William Rohrer	Fort Wayne Daisies	1947		
Mary Rountree	Fort Wayne Daisies	1950		
Leo Schrall	Peoria Redwings	1947–1949		
Ralph Shinners	Kenosha Comets	1947		
Mitch Skupien	Grand Rapids Chicks; Kalamazoo Lassies	1951; 1952–1954	1954	
Charley Stis	Racine Belles	1945		
Eddie Stumpf	Rockford Peaches; Kenosha Comets	1943; 1945		
Bill Wambsganss	Fort Wayne Daisies; Muskegon Lassies	1945–1946; 1947–1948		
Karl Winsch	South Bend Blue Sox	1951–1954	1951, 1952	
Len Zintak	Chicago Colleens; Springfield Sallies	1949; 1950		
