= Muskegon Belles =

- (1953); Muskegon, Michigan
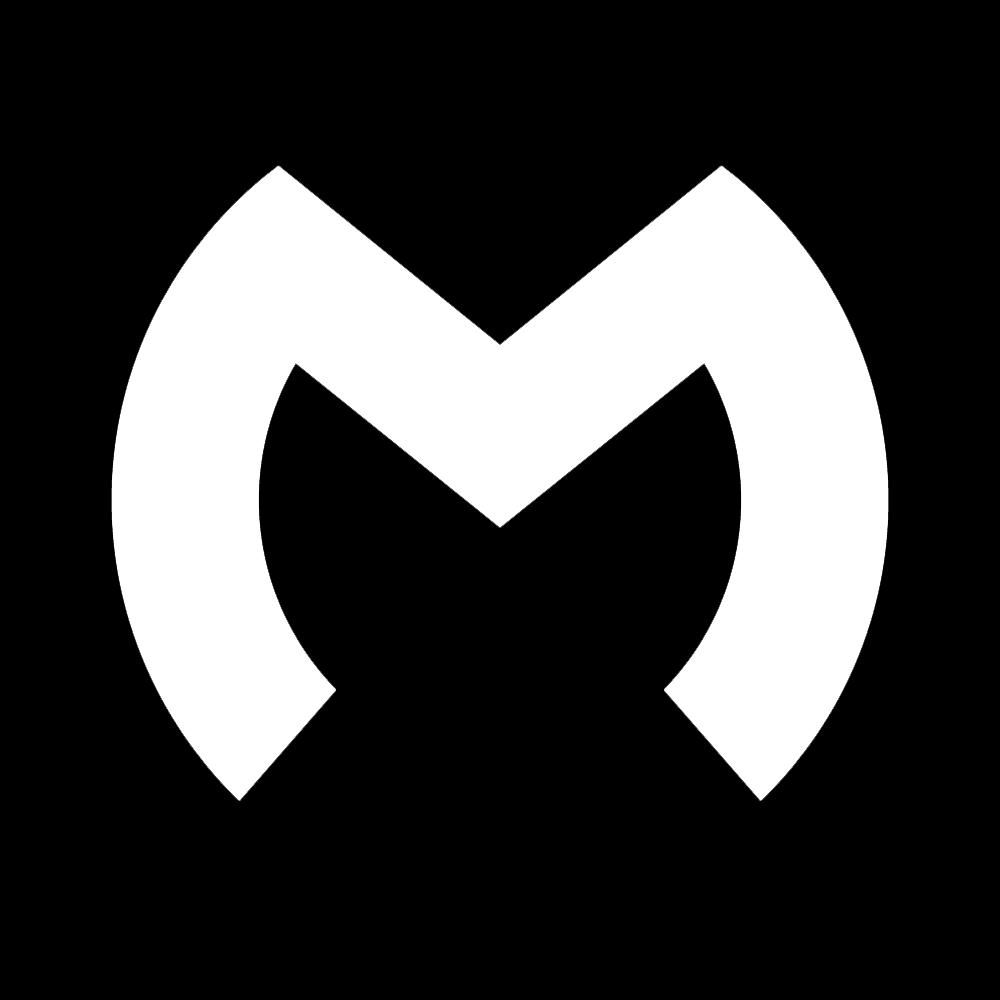

Minor league affiliations
- Previous leagues: All-American Girls Professional Baseball League

Team data
- Colors: Black, white
- Previous parks: Marsh Field
- Owner/ Operator: AAGPBL

The Muskegon Belles were a women's professional baseball team that played in the All-American Girls Professional Baseball League (AAGPBL) during the 1953 season. The Belles were based in Muskegon, Michigan.

== History ==
The Muskegon Belles played in 1953, with their home games played at Marsh Field. This made Muskegon the only city in AAGPBL history to host multiple teams. Previously, the Muskegon Lassies had played there from 1946 through 1950.

The new Belles team was also the third edition of a franchise. One of the All-American Girls Professional Baseball League's four charter franchises, the original club was founded in Racine, Wisconsin for the 1943 inaugural. Then the Racine Belles, the team moved to Battle Creek, Michigan, in 1951, was renamed the Battle Creek Belles and played for two years, before being replaced by the Muskegon Belles.

The 1953 Belles were the worst in the league. The team finished with a 39–70 record and folded after the end of the season, leaving the AAGPBL with just five teams for its final season in 1954.

== All-time roster ==
1953 Muskegon Belles Front row, L-R: Josephine Hasham, Betty McKenna, Noella Leduc, Renae Youngberg, Margaret Russo, Nancy Mudge, Betty Jean Peterson, Ruth Middleton. Back row, L-R: Kay Kimble (chaperone), Chris Ballingall, Phyllis Baker, Kathryn Vonderau, Marilyn Jones, Naomi Meier, Barbara Sowers, Jean Cione, Marjorie Pieper, Joe Cooper (manager).

- Phyllis Baker
- Chris Ballingall
- Mary Carey
- Jean Cione
- Donna Cook
- Miss Dougal
- Josephine Hasham
- Marilyn Jones
- Joyce Lake
- Noella Leduc
- Alta Little
- Betty McKenna
- Mirtha Marrero
- Naomi Meier
- Ruth Middleton
- Nancy Mudge
- Betty Jean Peterson
- Marjorie Pieper
- Margaret Russo
- Barbara Sowers
- Kathryn Vonderau
- Nancy Warren
- Renae Youngberg

Manager

- Joe Cooper

Chaperones

- Patricia Barringer
- Kay Kimble
