= Battle Creek Belles =

Women's professional baseball team

- 1951–1952; Battle Creek, Michigan
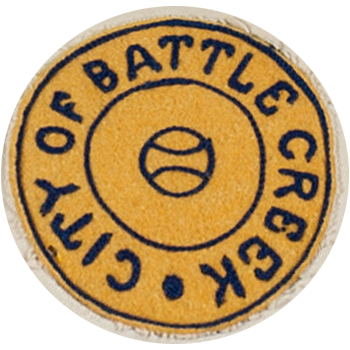

Minor league affiliations
- Previous leagues: All-American Girls Professional Baseball League

Team data
- Previous parks: Bailey Park
- Owner/ Operator: AAGPBL

The Battle Creek Belles were a women's professional baseball team that played from 1951 through 1952 in the All-American Girls Professional Baseball League (AAGPBL). The Belles represented Battle Creek, Michigan, and played their home games at Bailey Park.

== History ==
The Belles finished last in the first half of the 1951 season with an 11–45 record before improving to 19–35 in the second half for a 30-80 overall. The team posted a 43–67 record in the 1952 season, and finished in last place.

The club moved to Muskegon for the 1953 season and was renamed the Muskegon Belles.

== All-time roster ==
Bold denotes members of the inaugural roster

- **Agnes Allen**
- **Isabel Alvarez**
- Phyllis Baker
- **Patricia Barringer**
- **Fern Battaglia**
- **Erma Bergmann**
- Rita Briggs
- **Patricia Brown**
- Marge Callaghan
- Jean Cione
- **Donna Cook**
- Bonnie Cooper
- **Gloria Cordes**
- **Betty Jane Cornett**
- **Pauline Crawley**
- Mary Dailey
- **Gertrude Dunn**
- Mary Froning
- Barbara Galdonik
- Gertrude Ganote
- **Eileen Gascon**
- Josephine Hasham
- **Beverly Hatzell**
- **Ruby Heafner**
- **Jean Holderness**
- **Frances Janssen**
- Marilyn Jones
- **Erma Keyes**
- **Glenna Sue Kidd**
- **Jaynie Krick**
- Sophie Kurys
- Noella Leduc
- **Shirley Luhtala**
- **Betty McKenna**
- Marie Mansfield
- Mirtha Marrero
- Naomi Meier
- **Ruth Middleton**
- Jane Moffet
- Rose Montalbano
- **Mary Moore**
- Nancy Mudge
- **Dolly Niemieck**
- **Anna Mae O'Dowd**
- **Barbara Payne**
- Marguerite Pearson
- **June Peppas**
- **Migdalia Pérez**
- Ernestine Petras
- **Marjorie Pieper**
- **Janet Rumsey**
- Margaret Russo
- **Gloria Schweigerdt**
- Mary Sheehan
- Doris Shero
- Norma Sieg
- Hazel Smith
- Shirley Sutherland
- **Miss Thatcher**
- **Frances Vukovich**
- Helen Waddell
- Margaret Wenzell
- Betty Whiting
- **Sadie Wright**
- **Janet Young**

== Managers ==
* Dave Bancroft	1951
* Guy Bush	1951; 1952
* Joe Cooper	1952

== Chaperone ==
* Patricia Barringer	1951; 1952

== Sources ==
- All-American Girls Professional Baseball League official website – Battle Creek Belles seasons
- All-American Girls Professional Baseball League official website – Manager/Player profile search results
- All-American Girls Professional Baseball League Record Book – W. C. Madden. Publisher: McFarland & Company, 2000. Format: Hardcover, 294pp. Language: English. ISBN 0-7864-0597-X
- The Women of the All-American Girls Professional Baseball League: A Biographical Dictionary – W. C. Madden. Publisher: McFarland & Company, 2005. Format: Softcover, 295 pp. Language: English. ISBN 978-0-7864-2263-0
