= Jeanne Gilchrist =

Canadian baseball player

- Catcher
- Born: June 13, 1926; New Westminster, British Columbia, Canada
- Died: August 4, 2004 (aged 78); New Westminster, British Columbia, Canada
- Batted: Right Threw: Right

Teams
- Peoria Redwings (1946)

Career highlights and awards
- Women in Baseball – AAGPBL Permanent Display at Baseball Hall of Fame and Museum (since 1988); Canadian Baseball Hall of Fame Honorary Induction (1988)

Jeanne Gilchrist (June 13, 1926 – August 4, 2004) was a Canadian catcher who played in the All-American Girls Professional Baseball League. Listed at 5 ft 5 in (1.65 m), 125 lb (57 kg), Gilchrist batted and threw right handed. She was born in New Westminster, British Columbia.

Gilchrist was one of the 68 players born in Canada to join the AAGPBL in its twelve-year history. She appeared in three games for the Peoria Redwings in its 1946 season, serving in a backup role for incumbent catcher Mary Rountree. She had one hit in six at-bats for a .167 batting average during her brief playing stint in the league.

After baseball, Gilchrist worked as a teacher and was an avid sports girl, particularly in golf and curling, being a member of The Vancouver Golf Club for over 50 years as well as an Honorary Life Member of the Vancouver Business Women's Curling League. Additionally, tennis, bridge and lawn bowling completed her interests.

The AAGPBL folded in 1954, but there is a permanent display at the Baseball Hall of Fame and Museum at Cooperstown, New York, since November 5, 1988, that honors the entire league rather than any individual figure.

In 1998, Gilchrist and all Canadian AAGPBL players gained honorary induction into the Canadian Baseball Hall of Fame.

Gilchrist died in 2004 in New Westminster, British Columbia, at the age of 78.
