= Witiuk =

Witiuk is a surname. Notable people with the surname include:

- Doris Witiuk (1929–2014), Canadian baseball outfielder, wife of Steve Witiuk
- Steve Witiuk (1929–2022), Canadian ice hockey right winger
