= Marilyn Jones (baseball) =

- Pitcher / Catcher
- Born: April 5, 1927; Providence, Rhode Island, U.S.
- Died: July 22, 2015 (aged 88); Bradenton, Florida, U.S.
- Batted: Right Threw: Right

Teams
- Kenosha Comets (1948); Fort Wayne Daisies (1949, 1954); Chicago Colleens (1949); Rockford Peaches (1950–1951); Battle Creek Belles (1951–1952); Muskegon Belles (1953)

Career highlights and awards
- Championship Team (1950); Two postseason appearances (1950, 1954); Pitched a no-hitter (1952); Women in Baseball – AAGPBL Permanent Display at Baseball Hall of Fame and Museum (1988)

Marilyn Charlotte Jones [Doxey] (April 5, 1927 – July 22, 2015) was an American pitcher and catcher who played from 1948 through 1954 in the All-American Girls Professional Baseball League (AAGPBL). Listed at 5 ft 5 in (1.65 m), 135 lb (61 kg), she batted and threw right-handed.

Marilyn Jones was a better pitcher than hitter during her seven seasons in the All-American Girls Professional Baseball League. Her switch from catcher to pitcher kept her in the circuit, even though she was a career .158 hitter. A member of a champion team, Jones hurled a no-hitter and posted a 31–26 record with a 2.31 earned run average and a minuscule 0.98 WHIP in 69 pitching appearances, even though she pitched mostly for poor teams and suffered from lack of run support.

Born in Providence, Rhode Island, Jones began playing softball at age 12. She went on to play in an industrial softball league at age 16 with the Monowatt Electric Company, where she worked. After that she played for an independent softball team called the Riverside Townies, where she was discovered by an AAGPBL scout who contacted her parents about her playing in the league. Jones tried out in New Jersey in 1948 and was selected to assist at spring training camp at Opa-locka, Florida.

״Jonesy״, as her teammates called her, entered the league in 1948 with the Kenosha Comets, and would be used as a backup for catcher Dorothy Naum. She appeared in 25 games, managing only 2 hits in 50 at bats for a paltry .040 batting average. The next season she was sent to the Chicago Colleens development team to acquire more hitting experience.

She was promoted to the Rockford Peaches in 1950, which earned her more playing time under the rookie rule, because each team had to have a rookie in the roster during the regular season. Late in the season, regular catcher Ruth Richard broke a leg in a home-plate collision and Jones was called on to catch in the postseason. Rockford defeated Kenosha in the first round, 3 games to 1, and disposed of the Fort Wayne Daisies in the final round, 4 games to 3.

Jones opened 1951 with Rockford but was traded to the Battle Creek Belles during the midseason. In 1952, she was asked to pitch because the Belles had two injured pitchers and also had catcher Rita Briggs. She responded with a 9–7 mark and a 1.69 ERA in 17 games, ending third in the league for the best ERA behind South Bend Blue Sox's Jean Faut (0.93) and Kalamazoo Lassies' Gloria Cordes (1.44). Ironically, the second game that Jones pitched came against her former Daisies teammates on July 10. She pitched a 1–0 no-hitter against them, silencing a powerful lineup that included Wilma Briggs, Delores Brumfield, Thelma Eisen, Betty Foss, Katie Horstman, Dorothy Schroeder, Kathryn Vonderau and Joanne Weaver. In another memorable game, she lost a duel to Faut and the Blue Sox by a 1–0 score.

The franchise was renamed the Muskegon Belles after moving in 1953. Jones had another good season for her club, going 14–11 with a 2.56 ERA in 30 games, even though the Belles finished in last place with a 39–70 record. In addition, Jones ranked sixth in complete games (22), seventh in strikeouts (86) and eight in wins. When the Lassies folded up before the 1954 season, she returned to Fort Wayne, where she finished with an 8–8 record and helped the Daisies win the regular season pennant.

After the league folded in 1954, Jones worked for Michigan Bell Telephone Company for almost 32 years and also played for the Kalamazoo Lassies, a basketball team in the city composed of several All-Americans. In 1969, she married Bud Doxey, a softball umpire and former player, and raised two stepsons. She retired in 1983, while her husband died in 1999.

In 1988 she became part of Women in Baseball, a permanent display based at the Baseball Hall of Fame and Museum in Cooperstown, New York, which was unveiled to honor the entire All-American Girls Professional Baseball League. It was not really a well known fact until filmmaker Penny Marshall premiered her 1992 film A League of Their Own, which was a fictionalized account of activities in the AAGPBL. Starring Geena Davis, Tom Hanks, Madonna, Lori Petty and Rosie O'Donnell, this film brought many of the real AAGPBL former players a rebirth of celebrity.

== Career statistics ==
Pitching

GP	W	L	W-L%	ERA	IP	H	RA	ER	BB	SO	WHIP	SO/BB
69	31	26	.544	2.31	577	415	213	148	149	191	0.98	1.28

Batting

GP	AB	R	H	2B	3B	HR	RBI	SB	BB	SO	BA	OBP
222	481	43	76	7	0	0	28	4	66	79	.158	.260

Collective fielding

GP	PO	A	E	TC	DP	FA
155	273	197	59	529	4	.888
