= Mary Lou Beschorner =

American baseball player

- Outfield
- Born: September 18, 1929; Sandwich, Illinois, U.S.
- Died: November 8, 2008 (aged 79); Yorkville, Illinois, U.S.
- Batted: Right Threw: Right

Teams
- Grand Rapids Chicks (1949); Peoria Redwings (1950)

Career highlights and awards
- Women in Baseball – AAGPBL Permanent Display at Baseball Hall of Fame and Museum (1988)

Mary Lou Beschorner (September 18, 1929 – November 8, 2008) was an outfielder who played in the All-American Girls Professional Baseball League (AAGPBL). Listed at 5' 7", 135 lb., she batted and threw right handed.

Born in Sandwich, Illinois, Mary Lou was one of ten children born to William F. and Maria N. (née Loscher) Beschorner. Her interest in baseball began at an early age while playing throw and catch with her brother-in-law Marshall Shumaker, who raised her from age nine. In her teen years, she played organized softball with the Dekalb Hybrids team and graduated from Plano High School in 1947.

She later heard about the All-American Girls Professional Baseball League tryouts at Wrigley Field in Chicago and made the final cut. She attended the spring training held at West Baden Springs, Indiana, in 1949 and was assigned to the Grand Rapids Chicks, a team managed by former big leaguer Johnny Rawlings.

Beschorner was used mainly as a pinch-hitter the first season, appearing in 36 games while batting an average of .165 (14-for-85). She was still considered a rookie when she joined the Peoria Redwings in 1950. Redwings' manager Leo Murphy used her as a fourth outfielder that year behind Faye Dancer, Joyce Hill and Twila Shively. She finished with a .150 average in 49 games.

After the season, she married Robert F. Michealson and decided not to return to the league in 1951, although her husband told her that she could return. They had a son, Kirk Alan, and two grandchildren, Trevor and Hayley.

Her husband died in 1960, when her boy was three years old. She remarried again in 1972, to John L. Baskovich, and was widowed for a second time in 1995. He was very proud of her son, who graduated from the USNA and went on to be a commander in the United States Navy.

Mary Lou was a longtime resident of Plano, Illinois, where she worked as a bookkeeper for Town & Country Food Stores during 32 years, until her retirement in 1993.

Besides baseball, she was also an avid golfer and once had a four handicap. As a member of the Cedardell Golf Course in Plano, she won the Golf Club Ladies Invitational three times since it was established in 1987.

In addition, she set the ladies' golf record at three nine-hole golf courses in Illinois: Morris Country Club (1974), Cedardell Golf Club (1977) and Earlville Country Club (1985). She kept playing until the arthritis benched her.

″Bush″, as her AAGPBL teammates called her, received further recognition in 1988 when she became part of Women in Baseball, a permanent display based at the Baseball Hall of Fame and Museum in Cooperstown, New York, which was unveiled to honor the entire All-American Girls Professional Baseball League.

She died in 2008 in Yorkville, Illinois, at the age of 79.

== Career statistics ==
Batting

GP	AB	R	H	2B	3B	HR	RBI	SB	TB	BB	SO	BA	OBP	SLG
85	218	12	34	5	1	0	14	4	40	12	41	BA	.200	.183

Fielding

GP	PO	A	E	TC	DP	FA
64	77	4	4	85	0	.953
