= Peoria Redwings =

- 1946–1951; Peoria, Illinois
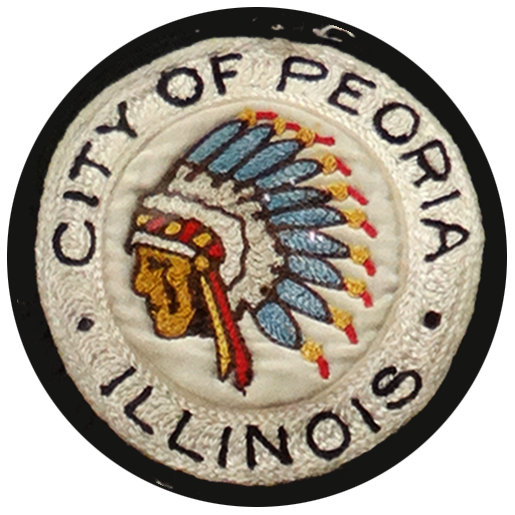

Minor league affiliations
- Previous leagues: All-American Girls Professional Baseball League

Team data
- Colors: Red, white, black
- Previous parks: Peoria Stadium
- Owner/ Operator: AAGPBL

The Peoria Redwings was a women's professional baseball team who joined the All-American Girls Professional Baseball League (AAGPBL) in the 1946 season and remained in the league through 1951. The team represented Peoria, Illinois, playing home games at Peoria Stadium.

== History ==
The Redwings made an unsteady start in their inaugural season, going 33–79 to finish last 41 games out of first place in the Western Division. The team improved in 1947 with a 54–57 record, good to finish in fifth place in the eight–team league.

Their most productive season came in 1948, when they finished 71–55 for third place in the division and fourth overall, gaining a playoff spot. In the playoffs, the Redwings were swept by the Racine Belles in three straight games.

Peoria fell to 36–43 and last place in 1949, and next–to–last in 1950 after ending 44–63–2. They went 48–56–2 in 1951, their last season, having finished over .500 once in six years of existence.

Some players of note included pitchers Doris Barr, Dorothy Mueller and Mary Nesbitt; infielders Margaret Callaghan, Betty McKenna and Dorothy Stolze; outfielders Eleanor Callow and Thelma Eisen, and OF/P Mary Reynolds. Eventually, Eisen and Reynolds served as player/managers for the team.

== All-time roster ==
1946 Peoria Redwings: Front row, L-R: Dorothy Ferguson, Terry Donahue, Rita Meyer, Betty Tucker, Mary Wood, Annabelle Lee. Second row, L-R: Irene Ines (chaperone), Mary Moriarity, Kay Blumetta, Jean Cione, Thelma Eisen, Florence Buccor, Bill Rodgers (manager). Back row, L-R: Donna Stageman, Norma Metrolis, Mary Reynolds, Frances Sloan, Mary Rountree, Pauline Crawley.

Bold denotes members of the inaugural roster

- **Velma Abbott**
- Doris Barr
- Mary Baumgartner
- Mary Lou Beschorner
- Maybelle Blair
- **Kay Blumetta**
- Rita Briggs
- Marian Bryson
- **Florence Bucior**
- Margaret Callaghan
- Eleanor Callow
- Mary Carey
- **Jean Cione**
- Corinne Clark
- **Pauline Crawley**
- Mary Dailey
- Faye Dancer
- Alice DeCambra
- Mildred Deegan
- Jerre DeNoble
- **Terry Donahue**
- **Thelma Eisen**
- June Emerson
- **Lillian Faralla**
- **Dorothy Ferguson**
- Helen Filarski
- Mary Flaherty
- Luisa Gallegos
- Gertrude Ganote
- Eileen Gascon
- **Jeanne Gilchrist**
- Geraldine Guest
- Audrey Haine
- Ann Harnett
- Josephine Hasham
- Beverly Hatzell
- Joyce Hill
- Barbara Hines
- **Nadine Hoffmann**
- Alice Hohlmayer
- **Jane Jacobs**
- Frances Janssen
- Christine Jewitt
- Josephine Kabick
- Jacquelyn Kelley
- Irene Kerwin
- Erma Keyes
- Glenna Sue Kidd
- Phyllis Koehn
- Mary Louise Kolanko
- Jaynie Krick
- **Mary Lawson**
- Noella Leduc
- **Annabelle Lee**
- Josephine Lenard
- Kay Lionikas
- **Frances Lovett**
- Mary McCarty
- **Helene Machado**
- Betty McKenna
- Lenora Mandella
- Naomi Meier
- Norma Metrolis
- **Rita Meyer**
- Dorothy Mueller
- Mary Nesbitt
- **Joanne Overleese**
- Marguerite Pearson
- Marjorie Pieper
- **Rita Rehrer**
- **Mary Reynolds**
- Georgiana Rios
- Jenny Romatowski
- Eilaine Roth
- Elaine Roth
- **Mary Rountree**
- Gloria Ruiz
- Margaret Russo
- June Schofield
- Twila Shively
- **Frances Sloan**
- Jean Smith
- Shirley Smith
- **Donna Stageman**
- Elma Steck
- **Jane Stoll**
- Dorothy Stolze
- Beverly Stuhr
- **Betty Terry**
- **Betty Tucker**
- Kathryn Vonderau
- Nancy Warren
- **Marion Watson**
- Margaret Wenzell
- Ruth Williams
- Dolores Wilson
- Mary Wisham
- **Mary Wood**

== Managers ==
* Bill Rodgers	1946 [first half]
* Thelma Eisen	1946 [second half]
* Johnny Gottselig	1947 [first half]
* Leo Schrall	1947 [second half] 1948; 1949
* Leo Murphy	1950 [first half]
* Mary Reynolds	1950 [second half]
* Johnny Rawlings	1951
