= Ruby Heafner =

American baseball player

- Catcher
- Born: March 5, 1924; Gastonia, North Carolina, U.S.
- Died: October 2, 2010 (aged 86); Kings Mountain, North Carolina, U.S.
- Batted: Right Threw: Right

Teams
- Rockford Peaches (1946); Fort Wayne Daisies (1947–1949); Racine Belles (1950); Battle Creek Belles (1951)

Career highlights and awards
- Women in Baseball – AAGPBL Permanent Display at Baseball Hall of Fame and Museum (1988)

Ruby Ethel "Rebel" Heafner (March 3, 1924 – October 2, 2010) was a right-handed catcher in the All-American Girls Professional Baseball League from 1946-51. She joined the AAGPBL after serving during World War II.

Playing for the Rockford Peaches in 1946, she hit .141 with six stolen bases in 47 games. In 1947, with the Fort Wayne Daisies, she hit .172 in 65 games. Again with Fort Wayne in 1948, Heafner batted .160 in 59 games and in 1949, she hit .171 in 50 games for the Daisies. Moving to the Racine Belles in 1950, Heafner hit .211 with a career-high 17 RBI in 65 games. In 1951, with the Battle Creek Belles, she hit .205 with 33 walks (to only 15 strikeouts) in 56 games.

In total, Heafner hit .178 with 171 hits in 959 at-bats. She hit 17 doubles, four triples and no home runs while scoring 83 runs and driving in 57. She had 28 stolen bases, 124 walks and 154 strikeouts.

She was born in Gastonia, North Carolina and died in Kings Mountain, North Carolina.
