= A Secret Love =

2020 documentary film by Chris Bolan

- Official poster
- Directed by: Chris Bolan
- Written by: Chris Bolan; Alexa L. Fogel; Brendan Mason
- Produced by: Ryan Murphy; Brendan Mason; Alexa L. Fogel
- Starring: Terry Donahue; Diana Bolan; Pat Henschel
- Cinematography: Stephen Kazmierski
- Edited by: Bernadine Colish
- Music by: Duncan Thum
- Production companies: Blumhouse Television; Ryan Murphy Productions; Beech Hill Films
- Distributed by: Netflix
- Release date: April 29, 2020 (United States)
- Running time: 83 minutes
- Country: United States
- Language: English

A Secret Love is a 2020 American documentary film, directed by Chris Bolan. Ryan Murphy serves as a producer on the film, while Jason Blum serves as an executive producer under his Blumhouse Television banner. It stars Terry Donahue and Pat Henschel. It was released on April 29, 2020, by Netflix.

== Premise ==
A former All-American Girls Professional Baseball League player, Terry Donahue, and her partner, Pat Henschel, met in Canada in 1947. They later moved to Chicago and ran a successful interior decorating business until the late 1980s. They kept their lesbian relationship a secret from their families for almost seven decades.

== Cast ==
- Terry Donahue
- Pat Henschel
- Diana Bolan

== Production ==
Chris Bolan, the director of the film, took a trip to visit his two great aunts, Terry Donahue and Pat Henschel. They told Bolan about their life together and after hearing it Bolan decided to tell their story via a documentary film.

== Release ==
The film was scheduled to have its world premiere at South by Southwest in March 2020; however, the festival was cancelled due to the COVID-19 pandemic. It was released on April 29, 2020.

== Reception ==
On review aggregator website Rotten Tomatoes, the film holds an approval rating of 100% based on 45 reviews, with an average rating of 7.9/10. The site's critics consensus reads: "In telling one couple's story, A Secret Love pays understated yet powerful tribute to a lifetime of choices and sacrifices made in the name of enduring devotion". On Metacritic, the film has a weighted average score of 77 out of 100, based on 12 critic reviews, indicating "generally favorable" reviews.

Stephanie Zacharek of Time wrote that the film is "heartfelt". Robyn Bahr of The Hollywood Reporter wrote that A Secret Love is "tender without being cloying, naturalistic without seeming contrived".

Shannon Keating of BuzzFeed was critical of the film, writing of "the subtle but insidious homophobia baked into this very telling of their story".
