= Marge Callaghan =

Canadian baseball player (1921–2019)

- Infielder
- Born: December 23, 1921; Vancouver, British Columbia, Canada
- Died: January 11, 2019 (aged 97); Vancouver, British Columbia, Canada
- Batted: Right Threw: Right

debut
- 1944

Last appearance
- 1951

Career statistics
- Games played: 672
- Batting average: .196
- On-base percentage: .319
- Fielding percentage: .923

Teams
- Minneapolis Millerettes (1944); Fort Wayne Daisies (1945–48); South Bend Blue Sox (1949); Peoria Redwings (1950–51); Battle Creek Belles (1951)

Career highlights and awards
- Three playoff appearances (1945, 1948-49); Canadian Baseball Hall of Fame and Museum AAGPBL Induction (1998); British Columbia Sports Hall of Fame and Museum Inductee (2008)

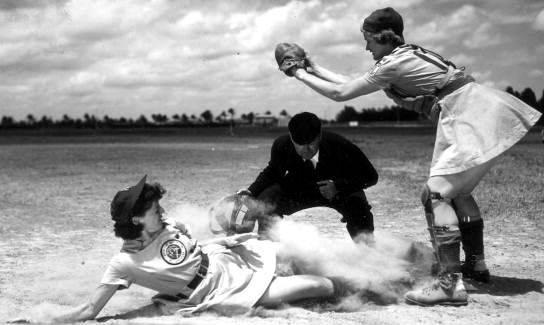
Marge Callaghan of the Fort Wayne Daisies sliding into home plate as umpire Norris Ward watches in Opa-locka, Florida on April 22, 1948

Margaret Callaghan Maxwell (December 23, 1921 – January 11, 2019) was an infielder who played from 1944 to 1951 in the All-American Girls Professional Baseball League (AAGPBL). Listed at 5' 3", 112 lb., she batted and threw right-handed.

A native of Vancouver, Callaghan was one of the sixty eight girls from Canada who played in the AAGPBL during its 12-year history. A light hitter, she only topped the .200 mark in batting average twice her entire career, hitting .196 in eight AAGPBL seasons with five different teams. But Callaghan had an uncanny ability to get on base, by any means, way above than the pure ability to get the hit, reaching first base by walks, by a bunt single or being hit by the pitcher. Incidentally, the relatively low batting averages from the 1943 season through 1947, before a smaller ball was introduced in 1948, reflect mainly the high quality of the AAGPBL pitchers, rather than a lack of skills by the hitters. In addition, Callaghan stole 283 bases and posted a solid .319 on-base percentage. On the field, she divided her time between playing second base and third for a collective .921 fielding percentage.

== Early years ==
Callaghan was one of five children (three sisters and two brothers) born into the family of Albert and Hazel (née Terryberry) Callaghan, of Irish ancestry. She grew up in a home where baseball was considered of vital importance, as her younger sister Helen teamed up with her in the AAGPBL and her nephew Casey Candaele played in Major League Baseball. Athletically inclined, Marge and Helen filled their student days at King Edward High School participating in almost every sport the school had to offer, competing in track and field, basketball, lacrosse, volleyball, soccer and field hockey. The sisters also played softball for the Vancouver Western Mutual team and performed at the 1943 World Series Softball tournament held at Detroit, Michigan, where they were recruited by a AAGPBL scout.

== Career ==
Callaghan entered the league in 1944 with the Minneapolis Millerettes, playing for them one year before joining the Fort Wayne Daisies (1945–48), South Bend Blue Sox (1949), Peoria Redwings (1950-'51) and Battle Creek Belles (1951). As a rookie, she hit .182 while playing third base. She improved to .196 in 1945 and reached the playoffs, but Fort Wayne lost to the Rockford Peaches in the final series, four to one games. In 1946 she batted .188 with a .355 on-base percentage, including career-highs in stolen bases (80) and walks (88), while tying for sixth in runs scored (70).

Callaghan enjoyed a good season in 1947 while moving to second base, when she hit .201 with a .331 OBP and 57 stolen bases, and belted her third and last career home run. She slipped to .187 and 42 steals in 1948, but set a career-high .945 fielding percentage. During the playoffs, she hit .123 with one homer and five runs, as the Daisies lost again to Rockford in the finals, four to one games. In 1949 she hit .169 with South Bend and made her last playoff appearance. She batted .157 for Peoria in 1950, and returned to third base in 1951, her last year in the league. She divided her playing time between Peoria and Battle Creek, hitting a career-high .236 with 26 steals and a .339 OBP.

== Legacy ==
The 1992 film A League of Their Own is about the first season of the All-American Girls Professional Baseball League. While the film does not use real names, filmmaker Penny Marshall seemed to be aiming for realism, as her film includes fake newsreel footage and pseudo-documentary present day scenes at the beginning and end of the fictitious story. A League of Their Own itself was inspired by the 1987 documentary of the same title, written and produced by Kelly Candaele, one of the five sons of the aforementioned Helen Callaghan. Candaele also collaborated with Kim Wilson in the story for the film. The AAGPBL players were relatively unknown until Marshall's film was exhibited for the first time, generating renewed interest in the league.

Marge and Helen Callaghan are part of the AAGPBL permanent display at the Baseball Hall of Fame and Museum at Cooperstown, New York, opened in 1988, which is dedicated to the entire league rather than any individual player. The sisters also received honorary inductions into the Canadian Baseball Hall of Fame and Museum (1998) and the British Columbia Sports Hall of Fame and Museum (2008). Helen died in 1992 at the age of 69. Marge died on January 11, 2019, aged 97.

== Career statistics ==
Batting

GP	AB	R	H	2B	3B	HR	RBI	SB	TB	BB	SO	BA	OBP	SLG
672	2058	280	403	18	9	3	143	283	448	371	319	.196	.319	.218

Fielding

GP	PO	A	E	TC	DP	FA
662	1218	1473	224	2915	130	.923
