= Beverly Hatzell =

American baseball player

- Pitcher
- Born: February 19, 1929; Redkey, Indiana, U.S.
- Died: August 28, 2005 (aged 76); Hicksville, Ohio, U.S.
- Batted: Right Threw: Right
- Stats at Baseball Reference

Teams
- Chicago Colleens (1949); Racine Belles (1950); Battle Creek Belles (1951); Peoria Redwings (1951)

Career highlights and awards
- Women in Baseball – AAGPBL Permanent Display at Baseball Hall of Fame and Museum (1988)

Beverly Hatzell (later Volkert; February 19, 1929 – August 28, 2005) was an American pitcher for the All-American Girls Professional Baseball League between 1949 and 1951. She both batted and threw right-handed.

Born in Redkey, Indiana, Volkert was one of five children born to Gerald and Velma Hatzell. She played for four teams of the All-American Girls Professional Baseball League: the Battle Creek Belles, the Chicago Colleens, Peoria Redwings and the Racine Belles. She married Mervin Volkert in February 1959, and they remained married until her death.

Volkert died in 2005, aged 76, in Hicksville, Ohio.

== Career statistics ==
Seasonal Pitching Records

Year	GP	IP	RA	ER	ERA	BB	SO	HBP	WP	W	L	W-L%
1949	-	-	-	-	-	-	-	-	-	-	-	-
1950	19	102	72	55	4.85	83	35	8	0	4	7	.364
1951	20	105	103	66	5.66	97	38	14	5	1	14	.067

Seasonal Batting Records

Year	GP	AB	R	H	2B	3B	HR	RBI	SB	TB	BB	SO	BA	OBP	SLG	OPS
1949	-	-	-	-	-	-	-	-	-	-	-	-	-	-	-	-
1950	26	37	3	3	0	0	0	1	0	3	6	13	.081	.209	.081	.290
1951	24	35	4	2	0	0	0	2	1	2	5	9	.057	.175	.057	.232
