= Helene Machado =

American baseball player (1926–2019)

- Outfielder
- Born: April 17, 1926; Venice, California, US
- Died: February 13, 2019 (aged 92); San Bernardino, California, US
- Batted: Right Threw: Right

Teams
- Peoria Redwings (1946); Fort Wayne Daisies (1947)

Career highlights and awards
- Women in Baseball – AAGPBL Permanent Display at Baseball Hall of Fame and Museum (since 1988)

Helene Machado [Van Sant] (April 17, 1926 – February 13, 2019) was an outfielder who played from 1946 to 1947 in the All-American Girls Professional Baseball League (AAGPBL). Listed at 5' 11", 148 lbs., she batted and threw right-handed.

== Upbringing ==
Machado was born and raised in Venice, California, being the only girl of five siblings. Her father was Porfirio Machado, a former boxer who taught his five children to box and play softball. As a result, he managed a softball team that included all five of his children and some cousins.

Afterwards, Helene became a solid softballer in the Los Angeles area while playing on two championship teams in the early 1940s. The AAGPBL began scouting her in 1942, but she was not signed until four years later because her father would not let her go to the league.

== Career ==
Machado started her career in the league with the Peoria Redwings in 1946 before joining the Fort Wayne Daisies in 1947. Unfortunately, her father had his foot amputated after it was stepped on by a horse, so she wanted to go back and help at home and never returned to the league.

Helene earned the unusual nickname “Chow” in Havana, Cuba after she collected the leftovers of food from her teammates for the street dogs during the spring training of 1947.

Following her short AAGPBL stint, Machado married George Van Sant. She played softball and baseball in local teams until a knee surgery in 1950 officially ended her career.

== Post-career life ==
She later obtained a real estate license and raised her family, largely as a single parent, as her husband George died of a heart attack in 1969.

In 1970, Helen obtained an Associate of Arts degree from San Bernardino Valley College and later a degree in social science at Cal State San Bernardino. She then was an eligibility worker for the San Bernardino County Department of Social Services in Fontana.

After retiring in 1991, she lived on a ranch in Devore, a mountainous neighborhood in San Bernardino where she cared for eight Arabian horses and stayed active in sports. She had seven grandchildren at last count.

In 1988, Helen and her former teammates were honored during the opening of Women in Baseball, a permanent display based at the Baseball Hall of Fame and Museum in Cooperstown, New York, which was unveiled to honor the entire All-American Girls Professional Baseball League. Another tribute to the AAGPBL players came with the 1992 film A League of Their Own, featuring Tom Hanks, Geena Davis and Madonna, and directed by filmmaker Penny Marshall.

In the mid-nineties, Helene remained an advocate for women's sports and sent a petition to the mayor of San Bernardino to start a local women's baseball club. She hoped for the best for players like the legendary Ila Borders and the all-female Colorado Silver Bullets, who were barnstorming across the United States, challenging men's pro, semi-pro, and amateur teams from coast to coast, as they tried to find their places in organized baseball.

Machado Van Sant died in 2019 in San Bernardino, California, at the age of 92.

== Personal life ==
Machado married George Van Sant in the late 1940s. They had three sons and three daughters, before George died of a heart attack in 1969.

== AAGPBL statistics ==
Batting

AB	R	H	2B	3B	HR	RBI	SB	BB	SO	AVG	OBP	SLG
163	19	113	13	4	0	17	33	35	32	.204	.252	.242

Fielding

PO	A	E	TC	DP	FA
261	14	17	292	2	.943
