= Frazer, Pennsylvania =

Unincorporated community in Pennsylvania, US

- Unincorporated community
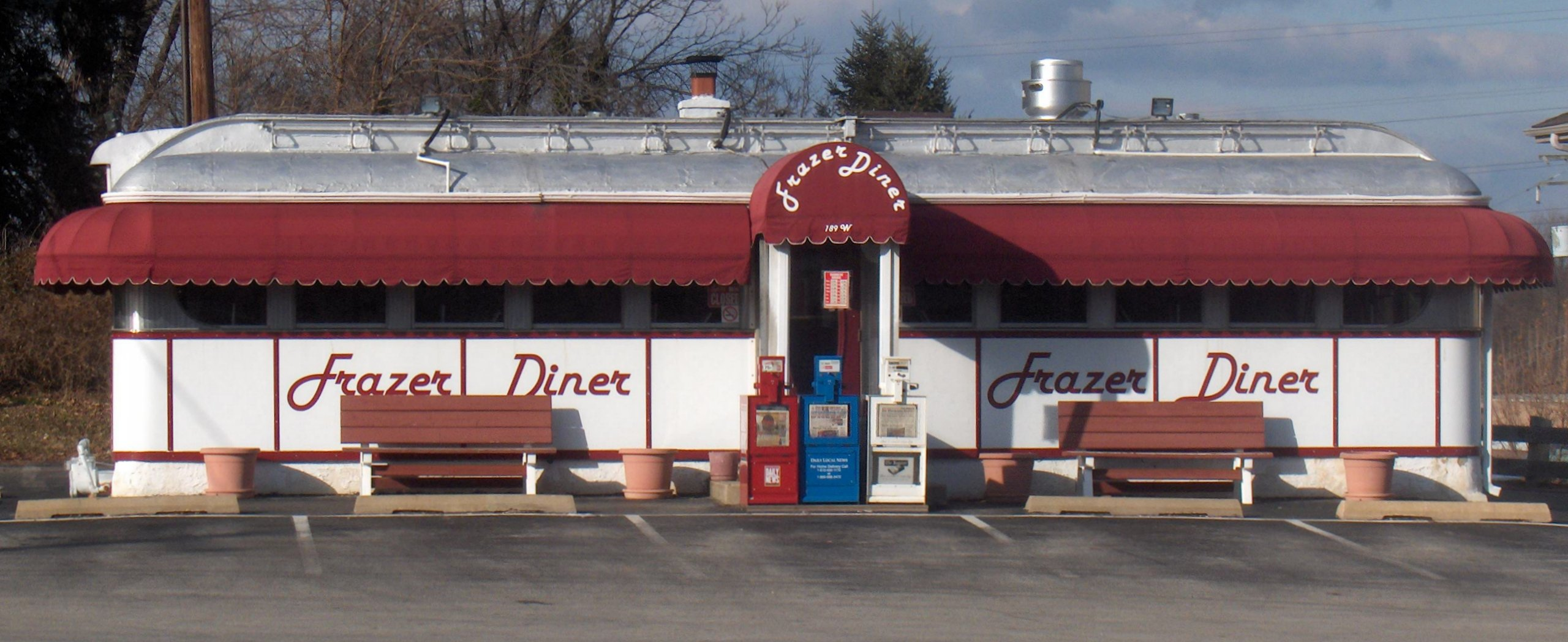
- Frazer Diner

- Location in Chester County and the U.S. state of Pennsylvania

- Location within Pennsylvania Location within the United States
- Coordinates: 40°01′56″N 75°33′22″W
- Country: United States
- State: Pennsylvania
- County: Chester
- Township: East Whiteland

Area
  - Total: 2.12 sq mi (5.48 km^{2})
  - Land: 2.12 sq mi (5.48 km^{2})
  - Water: 0.0039 sq mi (0.01 km^{2})
- Elevation: 558 ft (170 m)

Population (2020)
  - Total: 3,635
  - Density: 1,718.9/sq mi (663.67/km^{2})
- Time zone: UTC-5 (Eastern (EST))
  - Summer (DST): UTC-4 (EDT)
- ZIP code: 19355
- Area codes: 610 and 484
- GNIS feature ID: 1175184

Frazer is a census-designated place (CDP) in East Whiteland Township in Chester County, Pennsylvania, United States. It is located along US 30 between Exton and Malvern, and is the northern terminus for Pennsylvania Route 352. The former main line of the Pennsylvania Railroad, currently owned and operated by Amtrak and also used by SEPTA, passes through Frazer. While no station is located there, SEPTA Frazer Yard is a maintenance facility for the Paoli/Thorndale Line regional rail service. In 2019, the Delaware Valley Regional Planning Commission conducted a feasibility study for a new SEPTA station in Frazer and recommended a location near Immaculata University.

== Demographics ==
Historical population
Census	Pop.	Note	%±
2020	3,635		—

=== 2020 census ===
As of the 2020 census, Frazer had a population of 3,635. The median age was 36.9 years. 23.4% of residents were under the age of 18 and 13.7% of residents were 65 years of age or older. For every 100 females there were 105.0 males, and for every 100 females age 18 and over there were 108.2 males age 18 and over.

100.0% of residents lived in urban areas, while 0.0% lived in rural areas.

There were 1,370 households in Frazer, of which 37.5% had children under the age of 18 living in them. Of all households, 61.2% were married-couple households, 15.7% were households with a male householder and no spouse or partner present, and 19.3% were households with a female householder and no spouse or partner present. About 19.7% of all households were made up of individuals and 7.2% had someone living alone who was 65 years of age or older.

There were 1,436 housing units, of which 4.6% were vacant. The homeowner vacancy rate was 0.9% and the rental vacancy rate was 8.8%.

Racial composition as of the 2020 census
Race	Number	Percent
White	2,262	62.2%
Black or African American	85	2.3%
American Indian and Alaska Native	24	0.7%
Asian	897	24.7%
Native Hawaiian and Other Pacific Islander	0	0.0%
Some other race	155	4.3%
Two or more races	212	5.8%
Hispanic or Latino (of any race)	320	8.8%

== Education ==
It is in the Great Valley School District.

== Notable people ==
- Erma Keyes (1926–1999), All-American Girls Professional Baseball League player; born in Frazer and graduated from Ursinus College.
- Jack Lapp, a Major League Baseball catcher from 1908-1916 who played for the 1911 World Series champion Philadelphia Athletics, was born in Frazer.
- Archimedes Robb (1814–1875), American politician from Pennsylvania
- It is the town where singer-songwriter Jim Croce is buried.
