= Marjorie Pieper =

- Infield/outfield utility and pitcher
- Born: August 2, 1922; Clinton, Michigan, U.S.
- Died: February 6, 2008 (aged 85); Citrus Springs, Florida, U.S.
- Batted: Right Threw: Right

Teams
- Fort Wayne Daisies (1946–1947[start], 1949[start]); Kenosha Comets (1947[end]–1948[start], 1950[start]); Chicago Colleens (1948[end]); Racine Belles (1949[end]); Peoria Redwings (1950[end]–1951[start]); Battle Creek Belles (1951[end]–1952); Muskegon Belles (1953)

Career highlights and awards
- Women in Baseball – AAGPBL Permanent Display at Baseball Hall of Fame and Museum (1988)

Marjorie L. Pieper ["Peeps"] (August 2, 1922 – February 6, 2008) was an infielder, outfielder and pitcher who played from 1946 through 1953 in the All-American Girls Professional Baseball League (AAGPBL). Listed at 5 ft 7 in (1.70 m), 140 lb., she batted and threw right-handed.

Born in Clinton, Michigan, Marjorie Pieper saw action with seven different teams during her eight years in the league. She was used as an infield/outfield utility, playing mainly at shortstop, third base and right field, and eventually served as a spot starting pitcher. She also was a consistent hitter and showed good speed on the bases and in the field.

Pieper moved around for a while, as the AAGPBL shifted players as needed to help teams stay afloat. She never achieved a playoff berth, setting an all-time record for the most years in the league without playing in the postseason.

While growing up in Clinton, Pieper played basketball, softball and tennis. She graduated in physical education at University of Michigan and also worked in a local bookstore. In addition, she was a member of two Michigan State softball champion teams in 1944 and 1945 before playing in the AAGPBL.

Pieper entered the league in 1946 with the Fort Wayne Daisies, playing one and a half years for them before joining the Kenosha Comets (1947–1948) and the Chicago Colleens (1948). She played exclusively at shortstop in Fort Wayne and Kenosha, hitting a .173 batting average in her rookie season. She notably improved in 1947, batting .225 in a career-high 109 games, while collecting 119 total bases and a .322 of slugging. She also tied for fourth in doubles (11) and belted five home runs, being surpassed only by her Kenosha teammate Audrey Wagner (7) and the Rockford Peaches' Dorothy Kamenshek (6).

She opened 1948 in Kenosha, mainly as a backup for Fern Shollenberger at third base. Then she found herself on the move again in the midseason, this time to the Chicago Colleens, where she backed up Marge Villa at shortstop. Pieper hit a combined .190 average in 107 games, while collecting a career-high 57 stolen bases.

Pieper returned to Fort Wayne in 1949, but was sent to the Racine Belles at the end of the year. She finished with a low-career .163 in just 69 games, most of them playing at right field. She came back to Kenosha in 1950, for a short time, because she was assigned to the Peoria Redwings (1950–1951) before joining the Battle Creek Belles (1951–1952).

Pieper enjoyed a career year in 1952, when she posted career numbers in average (.253), runs scored (44), runs batted in (47), on-base percentage (.336) and slugging (.382), while leading Battle Creek in home runs (4) and RBI. She stayed with the franchise when it was renamed the Muskegon Belles in 1953, her last season. This time she played at center field, while collecting a .229 average with three homers and 38 RBI in 92 games.

Following her baseball career, Pieper taught physical education at the high school and college levels. In her spare time, she was an avid golfer. In 1988, she became part of Women in Baseball, a permanent display based at the Baseball Hall of Fame and Museum in Cooperstown, New York, which was unveiled to honor the entire All-American Girls Professional Baseball League.

Marjorie Pieper was a longtime resident of Citrus Springs, Florida, where she died in 2008 at the age of 85.

== Career statistics ==
Batting

GP	AB	R	H	2B	3B	HR	RBI	SB	TB	BB	SO	BA	OBP	SLG
718	2414	256	513	76	30	17	254	181	700	286	191	.213	.296	.290

Pitching

GP	W	L	W-L%	ERA	IP	H	RA	ER	BB	SO
8	1	2	.333	6.75	33	25	33	21	28	14

Fielding

GP	PO	A	E	TC	DP	FA
659	1526	714	200	2440	59	.920
