= Fern Battaglia =

American baseball player

- Third base / Second base
- Born: January 6, 1931; Chicago, Illinois, U.S.
- Died: March 15, 2001 (aged 70); Bensenville, Illinois, U.S.
- Batted: Right Threw: Right

Teams
- Chicago Colleens (1950); Battle Creek Belles (1951)

Career highlights and awards
- Women in Baseball – AAGPBL Permanent Display at Baseball Hall of Fame and Museum (1988)

Fern Gertrude Battaglia (January 6, 1931 – March 15, 2001) was an infielder who played in the All-American Girls Professional Baseball League (AAGPBL). Listed at 5' 4", 120 lb., she batted and threw right handed.

Born in Chicago, Illinois, the diminutive Fern Battaglia joined the league in 1950 with her hometown Chicago Colleens, by then a player development team. She split time between third and second bases in her rookie year, batting .204 (51-for-250) with one home run and 29 runs batted in in 67 games, gaining a promotion to the Battle Creek Belles for the 1951 season.

She then played half a season with the Belles before returning home to take care of her ill mother. Battaglia posted a .167 average in just 18 games and did not return to the league for a second season.

After that she was employed by the Illinois State Board of Education (ISBE), teaching at public schools in the Chicago area.

In 1988, Fern received further recognition when she became part of Women in Baseball, a permanent display based at the Baseball Hall of Fame and Museum in Cooperstown, New York, which was unveiled to honor the entire All-American Girls Professional Baseball League.

She was a longtime resident of Bensenville, Illinois, where she died in 2001 at the age of 70.

== Career statistics ==
Batting

GP	AB	R	H	2B	3B	HR	RBI	SB	BB	SO	BA	OBP
19	60	5	10	1	0	0	4	4	6	8	.167	.242

Fielding

GP	PO	A	E	TC	DP	FA
19	38	21	5	64	5	.922
