= Erma Keyes =

American baseball player

- Fourth outfielder
- Born: August 1, 1926; Frazer, Pennsylvania, U.S.
- Died: September 4, 1999 (aged 73); Exton, Pennsylvania, U.S.
- Batted: Right Threw: Right

Teams
- South Bend Blue Sox (1951); Battle Creek Belles (1951); Peoria Redwings (1951)

Career highlights and awards
- Women in Baseball – AAGPBL Permanent Display at the Baseball Hall of Fame and Museum (unveiled in 1988)

Erma Keyes (August 1, 1926 – September 4, 1999) was an American outfielder who played in the All-American Girls Professional Baseball League (AAGPBL). Listed at 5' 5", 135 lb., she batted and threw right handed. She was dubbed 'Erm' by her teammates.

Erma Keyes moved around for a while during her only season in the All American League, as the league shifted players as needed to help teams stay afloat.

Born in Frazer, Pennsylvania, Keyes graduated from Ursinus College in Pennsylvania, where she earned nine varsity letters before graduating with honors. She joined the league in 1951 while attending college and was assigned to the South Bend Blue Sox at the start of the season. She then was sent to the Battle Creek Belles in the midseason before joining the Peoria Redwings for the rest of the year.

Keyes posted a batting average of .212 (67-for-316) in 89 games, driving in 23 runs and scoring 23 times while stealing seven bases. At outfield, she recorded 120 putouts with 13 assists and turned a double play, committing nine errors in 142 total chances for a .937 fielding average.

Afterwards, Keyes became a longtime educator and also was an amateur golf champion.

In 1988, Erma Keyes received further recognition when she became part of Women in Baseball, a permanent display based at the Baseball Hall of Fame and Museum in Cooperstown, New York, which was unveiled to honor the entire All-American Girls Professional Baseball League rather than any individual figure.

She died in 1999 in Exton, Pennsylvania, at the age of 73.
