= Mel Meyer =

American artist

Brother Melvin A. Meyer (June 5, 1928 – October 12, 2013) was an artist who created an estimated 10,000 pieces of art during his career. He was a Marianist brother based out of Missouri.

== Early life and education ==
Meyer was the fourth of seven children in his home and the only one to become a religious brother. His sister was Rita Meyer. He was raised in Old Town Florissant, a suburb of St. Louis, by his parents, Harry and Margaret Meyer. He graduated from McBride High School, taught by members of the Marianist order. He entered the order in 1947 and took his final vows in 1952. He completed his undergraduate studies at the University of Dayton in Ohio. He taught religion and social studies at Central Catholic High School in San Antonio in the early 1950s. He completed his master's degree in art at the University of Notre Dame in 1960.

== Works ==
His work included metal sculptures, watercolors, stained glass, frescoes and acrylic on canvas paintings. He worked, as well, with handmade paper and textiles. He did much of his work at his studio on the campus at Vianney High School which he opened in 1969.

== Awards and honors ==
Brother Mel was awarded an honorary PhD from St. Louis University. There is a sculpture garden in St. Louis devoted exclusively to his work. A book about his life, Brother Mel: A Lifetime of Making Art, was published in 2009.

== Artist's philosophy ==
“Art is an outgrowth of what the person is," said Meyer. "I’m a happy person. The feeling of being happy finds its way into the art.”

== Death ==
Brother Mel died on October 12, 2013 at the Marianist community residence on the campus of St. John Vianney High School in Kirkwood, Missouri, of complications of heart disease. He was 85. Survivors include two sisters, Elsi Pondrom and Audrey Smith, and a brother, Gilbert Meyer.
