= Mary McCarty (baseball) =

American baseball player

- Outfielder
- Born: June 8, 1931; Flint, Michigan, U.S.
- Died: May 23, 2009 (aged 77); Flint, Michigan, U.S.
- Batted: Right Threw: Right

Teams
- Peoria Redwings (1951)

Mary McCarty [Jennings] (June 8, 1931 – May 23, 2009) was a backup outfielder who played in the All-American Girls Professional Baseball League (AAGPBL). Listed at 5' 6", 180 lb., McCarty batted and threw right handed. She was dubbed Mick by her teammates.

Born in Flint, Michigan, Mary McCarty played three years of softball and one year of baseball before joining the league with the Peoria Redwings in its 1951 season.

In a 72-game career, McCarty posted a batting average of .169 (35-for-207) with 24 RBI and 20 runs scored, including six doubles, two triples, and nine stolen bases.

As a fielder, she hauled in 83 putouts with nine assists and turned four double plays, while committing nine errors in 101 total chances for a .922 fielding average.

The All-American Girls Professional Baseball League folded in 1954, but there is now a permanent display at the Baseball Hall of Fame and Museum at Cooperstown, New York, since November 5, 1988, that honors those who were part of the league. Mary, along with the rest of the girls and the league staff, is included at the display/exhibit.
