= Shirley Luhtala =

American baseball player

- First baseman
- Born: April 9, 1933; DeKalb, Illinois, U.S.
- Died: January 30, 2013 (aged 79); Chandler, Arizona, U.S.

Teams
- Racine Belles (1950); Rockford Peaches (1951); Battle Creek Belles (1951)

Shirley Ann Luhtala (April 9, 1933 – January 30, 2013) was a first baseman in the All-American Girls Professional Baseball League (AAGPBL). She played for the Racine Belles in 1950 and the Battle Creek Belles and Rockford Peaches in 1951. In her final season, she hit .167 in 30 games.

She was born in DeKalb, Illinois and died in Chandler, Arizona.
