= Naomi Meier =

- Outfielder
- Born: November 17, 1926; Fort Wayne, Indiana, U.S.
- Died: July 15, 1989 (aged 62); Fort Wayne, Indiana, U.S.
- Batted: Right Threw: Right

Teams
- Rockford Peaches (1946–1947[start]); Fort Wayne Daisies (1947[end], 1950[end]–1952[start]); Peoria Redwings (1948[start]); Chicago Colleens (1948[end]); Racine Belles (1949[start]); Muskegon Lassies (1949[end], 1953); Kalamazoo Lassies (1950[start]); Battle Creek Belles (1952[end]); Muskegon Belles (1953)

Career highlights and awards
- Three postseason appearances (1946, 1949–1950); Women in Baseball – AAGPBL Permanent Display at Baseball Hall of Fame and Museum (1988)

Naomi Meier [″Sally″] (November 17, 1926 – July 15, 1989) was an outfielder who played from 1946 through 1953 in the All-American Girls Professional Baseball League (AAGPBL). Listed at 5 ft 5 in (1.65 m), 115 lb., Meier batted and threw right-handed. She was born in Fort Wayne, Indiana.

Naomi Meier moved around for a while, as the AAGPBL shifted players as needed to help teams stay afloat. Basically a line drive hitter and speedy base runner, she collected over 25 stolen bases in five of her eight seasons in the league. A player with good hands and a strong throwing arm, she also was capable of playing well all three outfield positions. She played for nine teams and thirteen different rosters in a span of eight years.

Meier entered the league in 1946 with the Rockford Peaches, playing for them one and a half years before joining the Fort Wayne Daisies (1947). Then she found herself on the move again, this time to the Peoria Redwings (1948) and Chicago Colleens (1948), and then the Muskegon Lassies (1949), Racine Belles (1949), Kalamazoo Lassies (1950), followed by a new trip to Fort Wayne (1950–1952). She later was part of the Battle Creek Belles (1952) and played her last season for the Muskegon Belles (1953).

In her rookie year, Meier appeared in 103 games and hit a .249 batting average with a career-high 49 runs batted in while scoring 44 times. Her most productive season came in 1948, when she posted career numbers in hits (100), at-bats (450), runs scored (54), stolen bases (55) and games played (127), adding a .222 average and 47 RBI. She raised her average to a career-high .261 in 1950, while collecting a second-best 34 stolen bases in 99 games.

In 1951, Meier suffered a season-ending compound fracture of her right ankle while sliding into second base. Used sparingly in 1952, she hit .229 and stole 25 bases in 111 games during the 1953 season, her last in the league.

A .258 career hitter, she reached the postseason with the Peaches (1946), Lassies (1949) and Daisies, collecting a .208 average (21-for-201) with one double, seven runs, seven RBI and six stolen bases in 27 games. In 690 games at outfield, she committed only 73 errors in 1226 chances for a .941 fielding average.

In 1988 she became part of Women in Baseball, a permanent display based at the Baseball Hall of Fame and Museum in Cooperstown, New York, which was unveiled to honor the entire All-American Girls Professional Baseball League. It was not really a well known fact until filmmaker Penny Marshall premiered her 1992 film A League of Their Own, which was a fictionalized account of activities in the AAGPBL. Starring Geena Davis, Tom Hanks, Madonna, Lori Petty and Rosie O'Donnell, this film brought many of the real AAGPBL former players a rebirth of celebrity.

Naomi Meier died in Fort Wayne, Indiana, at the age of 62.

== Career statistics ==
Batting

GP	AB	R	H	2B	3B	HR	RBI	SB	TB	BB	SO	BA	OBP	SLG
710	2456	265	560	33	14	4	234	206	633	219	277	.258	.291	.258

Fielding

GP	PO	A	E	TC	DP	FA
690	1106	47	73	1226	9	.941
