= Rita Meyer (baseball) =

American baseball player (1927–1992)

- Shortstop/Pitcher
- Born: February 12, 1927; Florissant, Missouri, U.S.
- Died: June 16, 1992 (aged 65); St. Louis, Missouri, U.S.
- Batted: Right Threw: Right

Teams
- Peoria Redwings (1946–1949)

Career highlights and awards
- Single season leader in runs batted in (1948)

Rita Ann Meyer (later Moellering; February 12, 1927 – June 16, 1992) was a shortstop and pitcher who played from 1946 through 1949 for the Peoria Redwings of the All-American Girls Professional Baseball League (AAGPBL). Listed at 5 ft 10 in (1.78 m), 145 lb., Meyer batted and threw right-handed. She was born in Florissant, Missouri.

Rita Meyer was the oldest of seven children and her brother was an artist monk Mel Meyer. A good fielding shortstop and average hitter during her four seasons in the All-American Girls Professional Baseball League, she was one of 13 players who made the AAGPBL clubs hailed from Missouri. Meyer was nicknamed Slats after St. Louis Cardinals shortstop Marty Marion, just given the nickname of Marion because someone said she reminded them of his play – quite a common way to get a nickname in sports.

In 1946 Meyer tried out for the league at spring training in Pascagoula, Mississippi, and was allocated to the Redwings expansion team based in Peoria, Illinois. She appeared regularly at shortstop and also pitched in 13 games in 1947. Meyer hurled a no-hitter in that season, but lost the game, 1–0. Her most productive season came in 1948, when she posted career-highs in batting average (.232), doubles (12), stolen bases (45) and runs batted in (68). The Redwings advanced to the first round of the playoffs for the first – and only – time in team history, but were swept by the Racine Belles in three straight games.

Rita Meyer married Robert Moellering in 1949. She resided after that in St. Louis, Missouri, where she became an active participant in public school sports for the rest of her life. On November 5, 1988, she was honored with the rest of the All-American Girls Professional Baseball League during the opening of a permanent display at the Baseball Hall of Fame and Museum in Cooperstown, New York. Besides this, the St. Louis Sports Commission presents the Rita "Slats" Meyer Moellering Memorial Award, named after her, to recognize the accomplishments of women in individual sports. Her many hobbies included collecting emblems, poems and Dick Tracy comic strips. She died in St. Louis at the age of 65.

Batting statistics

GP	AB	R	H	2B	3B	HR	RBI	SB	BB	SO	BA
399	1385	121	284	24	7	3	140	76	83	96	.205

Pitching statistics

GP	W	L	W-L%	ERA	IP	H	R	ER	BB	SO	WHIP
13	3	6	.333	3.12	75	45	41	26	48	56	1.240
