= Marian Bryson =

American baseball player

- Pitcher
- Bats: Right Throws: Right

Teams
- Peoria Redwings (1946)

Career highlights and awards
- Women in Baseball – AAGPBL Permanent Display at Baseball Hall of Fame and Museum (since 1988)

Marian Bryson was a right handed pitcher in the All-American Girls Professional Baseball League who played for the Peoria Redwings in its 1946 season. Bryson was born in Los Angeles, California. She was dubbed Scotty.

Bryson posted a 0–8 record with a 5.32 ERA in 14 pitching appearances, striking out 11 batters while walking 36 in 71.0 innings of work. As a hitter, she went 2-for-18 for a .112 batting average.

Bryson is part of the AAGPBL permanent display at the Baseball Hall of Fame and Museum at Cooperstown, New York opened in 1988, which is dedicated to the entire league rather than any individual figure.
