= Geraldine Guest =

American baseball player

- Outfielder
- Born: September 24, 1913; Flint, Michigan, U.S.
- Died: September 27, 2006 (aged 93); Flint, Michigan, U.S.
- Batted: Right Threw: Right

Teams
- Peoria Redwings (1951)

Career highlights and awards
- Women in Baseball – AAGPBL Permanent Display at the Baseball Hall of Fame and Museum (unveiled in 1988)

Geraldine "Jerry" Guest (September 24, 1913 – September 27, 2006) was an outfielder who played in the All-American Girls Professional Baseball League (AAGPBL). She batted and threw right handed.

Born in Flint, Michigan, Guest began playing softball at age 15. She worked at the AC Spark Plug Company based in Flint East before joining the All American League in its 1951 season. She was assigned to the Peoria Redwings and appeared in 22 games for them.

She posted a batting average of .119 with five runs scored and two runs batted in while stealing one base. At the outfield, she recorded 19 putouts with two assists and turned one double play without errors for a 1.000 fielding average.

In 1988 was inaugurated a permanent display at the Baseball Hall of Fame and Museum at Cooperstown, New York, that honors those who were part of the All-American Girls Professional Baseball League. Guest, along with the rest of the girls and the league staff, is included at the display/exhibit.

She died in 2006 in Flint, Michigan, just three days after her 93rd birthday.

== Career statistics ==
Batting

GP	AB	R	H	2B	3B	HR	RBI	SB	TB	BB	SO	BA	OBP	SLG	OPS
26	42	5	5	0	0	0	2	1	5	3	12	.119	.178	.119	.297

Fielding

GP	PO	A	E	TC	DP	FA
15	15	2	0	17	1	1.000
