= Maybelle Blair =

American baseball player (born 1927)

- Born: January 16, 1927 (age 99); Inglewood, California, U.S.
- Bats: Right Throws: Right
- Stats at Baseball Reference

Teams
- Peoria Redwings (1948)

Career highlights and awards
- Women in Baseball – AAGPBL Permanent Display at Baseball Hall of Fame and Museum (since 1988)

Maybelle Blair (born January 16, 1927) is a former All-American Girls Professional Baseball League player. Listed at 5 feet 6 inches (168 cm) and 150 pounds (68 kg), she batted and threw right-handed.

Born in Inglewood, California, Blair was a pitcher and joined the league with the Peoria Redwings in its 1948 season, although she appeared in only one game for the team, and then moved the next year to a professional softball league in Chicago to play for the Chicago Cardinals. Later, she played for the Jax Girls softball club of New Orleans. Afterwards, Blair attended Compton Junior College in California and then Los Angeles School of Physiotherapy. Following her graduation, she worked at a treatment center in Los Angeles before began a long 37-year career at Northrop Corporation, where she started as a chauffeur and ended up as the manager of highway transportation, being one of the three female managers the company employed in that period.

Following her retirement, Blair became vice president of Center for Extended Learning for Seniors (CELS); an educational travel tours program provider for Elderhostel. Blair also became a collaborator in different projects of the AAGPBL Players Association since its foundation in 1982, serving on the board of directors and the Chair of the Fundraising Committee. The association helped to bring the league story to the public eye and was largely responsible for the opening of Women in Baseball, a permanent display based at the Baseball Hall of Fame and Museum, which was unveiled in 1988 to honor the entire All-American Girls Professional Baseball League rather than any individual personality. In addition, Blair was a founding member of the International Women's Baseball Center (IWBC), a nonprofit building an educational center and museum in Rockford, Illinois, the home of the Rockford Peaches.

In 2022, Blair publicly came out as a lesbian while promoting the TV series A League of Their Own, saying that prior to her time in the AAGPBL, “I thought I was the only one in the world… I hid for 75, 85 years and this is actually, basically, the first time I’ve ever come out.” In 2023 she received the first Amazin’ Mets Foundation Legacy Award.

In 2024, the Women's Pro Baseball League (WPBL) announced plans for a new professional circuit for female players which would debut in 2026, and named Blair as Honorary Chair of the WPBL Advisory Board. She threw the ceremonial first pitch at the WPBL's inaugural game on August 1, 2026.
