= Jerre DeNoble =

- Outfielder
- Born: June 11, 1923; Oakland, California, U.S.
- Died: January 18, 2011 (aged 87); San Lorenzo, California, U.S.
- Batted: Right Threw: Right

Teams
- Peoria Redwings (1947)

Jerre DeNoble (June 11, 1923 – January 18, 2011) was an American outfielder who played part of a season in the All-American Girls Professional Baseball League (AAGPBL). She batted and threw right-handed.

Born in Oakland, California, Jerre DeNoble started to play baseball when she was 14 years old. She joined the league with the Peoria Redwings in the 1947 season, after attending the first AAGPBL spring training outside the United States which was held in Havana, Cuba.

DeNoble was regarded as a solid outfielder and for her flashy speed on the basepaths, but she did not have many opportunities to show off her qualities after sustaining assorted injuries to her shoulder, a leg and a broken finger. She contributed to the Redwings first victory that year by scoring the winning run in the 12th inning of a game against the Racine Belles. During her brief stint with Peoria, she posted a .107 batting average and stole 11 bases in 21 game appearances.

Following her baseball career, DeNoble worked at the Owens-Illinois for 40 years, retiring in 1981.

Since 1988 she is part of Women in Baseball, a permanent display based at the Baseball Hall of Fame and Museum in Cooperstown, New York, which was unveiled to honor the entire All-American Girls Professional Baseball League rather than individual baseball personalities.

DeNoble was a longtime resident of San Lorenzo, California, where she died at the age of 89.

== Career statistics ==
Batting

GP	AB	R	H	2B	3B	HR	RBI	SB	TB	BB	SO	BA	OBP	SLG	OPS
21	28	3	3	1	0	0	0	4	4	3	11	.107	.194	.143	.336

Fielding

GP	PO	A	E	TC	DP	FA
11	12	0	1	13	0	.923
