= Joyce Lake =

Baseball player

Joyce Lake was an All-American Girls Professional Baseball League player.

== Notes ==
Little is known about this player. Lake appears in the records as a member of the Muskegon Belles club during its 1953 season. Nevertheless, the league stopped individual achievements after 1948, so individual accomplishments are complete only through 1948.

She is part of the AAGPBL permanent display at the Baseball Hall of Fame and Museum in Cooperstown, New York opened in 1988, which is dedicated to the entire league rather than any individual figure.
