= Noella Leduc =

- Pitcher / Outfield
- Born: December 23, 1933; Graniteville, Westford, Massachusetts, U.S.
- Died: August 22, 2014 (aged 80); Leonardo, New Jersey, U.S.
- Batted: Right Threw: Right

Teams
- Peoria Redwings (1951); Battle Creek Belles (1952); Muskegon Belles (1953); Fort Wayne Daisies (1954)

Career highlights and awards
- All-Star Game winning pitcher (1954); Postseason appearance (1954); Women in Baseball – AAGPBL Permanent Display at Baseball Hall of Fame and Museum (1988)

Noella Leduc (née Alverson; December 23, 1933 – August 22, 2014) was an American pitcher and outfielder who played from 1951 through 1954 in the All-American Girls Professional Baseball League (AAGPBL). Listed at 5 ft 5 in (1.65 m), 130 lb, Leduc batted and threw right-handed. She was born in Graniteville, Westford, Massachusetts.

Noella Leduc pitched and served as a backup outfielder during the last four years of the league. A member of a champion team, she also was the winning pitcher in the last All-Star Game in 1954.

Leduc grew up playing sandlot ball with her neighborhood kids at age five, most of them boys. When she attended high school, she had to play softball, but after school she accustomed to play baseball with the boys again. In 1951, while playing in a boys' team, Leduc was spotted by AAGPBL catcher Rita Briggs. She tried out for Briggs, who recommended her to attend the league's spring training in Peoria, Illinois. ״Pinky״, the nickname Briggs gave her, was assigned to the Peoria Redwings, but she had few chances to play during the season.

In 1952 Leduc joined the Battle Creek Belles. She finished with a 3–4 mark and a 3.11 earned run average in 19 pitching appearances. In the mid of the year, she hurled and won a 14-inning complete game while scoring the winning run after hitting a double. She stayed with the franchise when it moved in 1953 and was renamed the Muskegon Belles. She slipped to a 3–9 record for a team that went 38–67 and finished in last place, 28 games out of contention.

In her final season, Leduc was selected by the Fort Wayne Daisies. This time, her team gave her plenty of run support, as she went 9–10, tying for fourth in games pitched (24). In addition, the Daisies defeated the All-Star Team that season and she was the winning pitcher. At the end, Fort Wayne repeated the regular season title and won the Grand Rapids Chicks in the first round, but lost to the Kalamazoo Lassies in the best-of-five final round, three games to two. In six postseason games, Leduc batted .238 (5-for-21) and drove in four runs, but she did not pitch in any game.

She married George Alverson in 1964. The couple had a daughter, Betsy, and lived in Leonardo, New Jersey.

Pinky is part of Women in Baseball, a permanent display based at the Baseball Hall of Fame and Museum in Cooperstown, New York, which was unveiled in 1988 to honor the entire All-American Girls Professional Baseball League.

== Career statistics ==
Pitching

GP	W	L	W-L%	ERA	IP	H	RA	ER	BB	SO	WP	HBP	WHIP
67	15	23	.395	4.96	303	331	218	167	146	66	4	10	1.57

Batting

GP	AB	R	H	2B	3B	HR	RBI	SB	BB	SO	BA	OBP
144	267	33	52	6	0	2	21	4	23	66	.195	.259

Fielding

GP	PO	A	E	TC	DP	FA
129	85	100	5	190	1	.974
