= Pauline Crawley =

American baseball player

- Outfield
- Born: September 11, 1924; Phoenix, Arizona, U.S.
- Died: September 18, 2003 (aged 79); Cathedral City, California, U.S.
- Batted: Right Threw: Right

Teams
- Peoria Redwings (1946); Battle Creek Belles (1951)

Career highlights and awards
- Women in Baseball – AAGPBL Permanent Display at Baseball Hall of Fame and Museum (1988)

Pauline Crawley (September 11, 1924 – September 18, 2003) was a fourth outfielder who played in the All-American Girls Professional Baseball League (AAGPBL). Listed at 5' 4", 145 lb., she batted and threw right handed.

Born in Phoenix, Arizona, the diminutive Pauline Crawley was a surehanded outfielder with a strong throwing arm. She played in parts of only two seasons in the league over a six-year span due to a severe knee injury.

Crawley started to play softball at age 11 in a Phoenix league. Her softball team was a perennial participant in national tournaments. She earned her nickname ″Hedy″ as a teenager, because she kiddingly said that she bore resemblance to Hedy Lamarr, one of her favorite movie stars. Her close friend Joanne Winter, a pitcher who had joined the league in its inaugural 1943 season, arranged for her to try out with future Hall of Famer Max Carey, by then the league's president. She was accepted by Carey and assigned to the Peoria Redwings for the start of the 1946 season.

About halfway through her rookie season, Crawley twisted her left knee and was required to have surgery. She even paid for the operation's fuel cost. "I had injured my knee in Phoenix and I didn't think it was their fault", she explained in an interview. As a result, the league did not offer her a contract the next year. She then joined the rival National Girls Baseball League in Chicago from 1947 through 1950.

After that, Crawley took an employment with United Airlines before deciding to return to the AAGPBL without a guaranteed contract. She was accepted and relocated to the Battle Creek Belles, playing for them the entire 1951 season.

In 1952, Crawley quit baseball and went on to attend California State University, where she earned a bachelor's degree. She then rejoined United Airlines, working for them as an executive secretary during 32 years. She later worked four years with Northrop Aircraft manufacturer before retiring for good.

Over the years, she had four knee surgeries on her knee before she had replaced it in 1993 by Dr. Robert Murphy, a skilled orthopaedic surgeon who replaced the injured knee of former U.S. President Gerald Ford.

Crawley remained living in the area of California for a long time. After retiring, she enjoyed playing golf and assisted to AAGPBL Players Association reunions. The association was largely responsible for the opening of Women in Baseball, a permanent display at the Baseball Hall of Fame and Museum at Cooperstown, New York, which was inaugurated in November 1988.

In addition, she formed part of the Golden Diamond Girls, a group of former players who attend vintage baseball card shows and sign autographs.

Pauline Crawley died in 2003 in Cathedral City, California, a week after her 79th birthday.

== Career statistics ==
Batting

GP	AB	R	H	2B	3B	HR	RBI	SB	TB	BB	SO	BA	OBP	SLG
125	418	40	67	2	2	0	25	21	73	33	44	.160	.222	.175

Fielding

GP	PO	A	E	TC	DP	FA
119	166	17	9	192	3	.953
