= Mary Lawson (baseball) =

American baseball player

- Outfielder
- Born: August 15, 1924; Norfolk, Virginia, U.S.
- Died: September 6, 1997 (aged 73); Norfolk, Virginia, U.S.
- Batted: Right Threw: Right

Teams
- Peoria Redwings (1946)

Career highlights and awards
- Women in Baseball – AAGPBL Permanent Display at Baseball Hall of Fame and Museum (since 1988)

Mary Lawson (August 15, 1924 – September 6, 1997) was an American backup outfielder and right handed hitter who played in the All-American Girls Professional Baseball League (AAGPBL). She was born in Norfolk, Virginia.

Lawson spent her only season in the league as a member of the Peoria Redwings during its inaugural season of 1946.

In a 25-game career, Lawson hit .105 (6-for-57) with a double and one stolen base, driving in one run while scoring three times. At outfield, she recorded 27 putouts with three assists and turned one double play, while committing two errors in 32 total chances for a .938 fielding average.

The AAGPBL folded in 1954, but there is now a permanent display at the Baseball Hall of Fame and Museum at Cooperstown, New York since November 5, 1988 that honors those who were part of this unique experience. Mary Lawson, along with the rest of the league's girls, is included at the display/exhibit.
