= Corinne Clark =

American baseball player (1923–2006)

- Utility player
- Born: September 23, 1923; Yorkville, Illinois, U.S.
- Died: December 2, 2006 (aged 83); Albuquerque, New Mexico, U.S.
- Batted: Right Threw: Right

Teams
- Peoria Redwings (1949)

Career highlights and awards
- Women in Baseball – AAGPBL Permanent Display at Baseball Hall of Fame and Museum (since 1988)

Marcia Corinne "Corky" Clark (September 23, 1923 – December 2, 2006) was an infield/outfield utility and right-handed hitter who played in the All-American Girls Professional Baseball League (AAGPBL). She was dubbed Corky.

Clark was born in Yorkville, Illinois and graduated from Yorkville High School in 1941. She served in the Navy WAVES during World War II where she became a Machinist's Mate 2nd Class. she then joined the league with the Peoria Redwings in its 1949 season. Subsequently, she played softball in a Chicago league.

Afterwards, Clark earned three degrees and held leadership roles in physical education associations for more than two decades. She earned her Master of Science degree from Columbia University, following her Bachelor of Physical Education degree from Indiana University and a Bachelor of Physical Education degree from Indiana University.

Clark was chairman of the Health, Physical Education, and Recreation Department at the University of Wisconsin–Whitewater, then served as an Associate Dean of the College of Education until her retirement after 20 years of service. After retiring, she moved to Albuquerque, New Mexico.

An avid golfer since an early age, Clark was actively involved in women's amateur golf in New Mexico since 1988. As a result, the Corky Clark Junior Golf Foundation was established in 1998 in recognition of Corinne 'Corky' Clark. Since then, the Albuquerque Women's Golf Championship each year recognizes her praiseworthy contribution with the Corky Clark Cup presentation to the tournament champion.

The American Girls Professional Baseball League folded in 1954, but there is now a permanent display at the Baseball Hall of Fame and Museum at Cooperstown, New York since November 5, 1988 that honors those who were part of this unique experience. Clark, along with the rest of the league's girls, is included at the display/exhibit.

In addition, Clark gained induction into the UW–Whitewater Athletic Hall of Fame in 1991. Then in 2003, the university dedicated a permanent display case honoring her year in the All-American Girls Professional Baseball League.

Clark died in 2006 in Albuquerque, New Mexico, at the age of 83.
