= Mary Dailey =

American baseball player

- Infield / Pitcher
- Born: December 5, 1928; Lexington, Massachusetts, U.S.
- Died: December 5, 1965 (aged 37); Lexington, Massachusetts, U.S.
- Batted: Right Threw: Right

Teams
- South Bend Blue Sox (1950[start], 1951[mid]); Peoria Redwings (1950[end], 1951[start]); Battle Creek Belles (1951[end])

Career highlights and awards
- Women in Baseball – AAGPBL Permanent Display at Baseball Hall of Fame and Museum (1988)

Mary Dailey (December 5, 1928 – December 5, 1965) was an American utility infielder and a pitcher who played in the All-American Girls Professional Baseball League (AAGPBL). Listed at 5 ft 2 in (1.57 m), 134 lb, Dailey batted and threw right-handed. She was born in Lexington, Massachusetts.

Mary Dailey played for three different teams in five different transactions during her two seasons in the All-American Girls Professional Baseball League.

Originally an infielder, Dailey entered the league in 1950 with the South Bend Blue Sox and was dealt to the Peoria Redwings during the midseason. After opening 1951 with Peoria, she returned to South Bend and finished the year with the Battle Creek Belles.

In her last season, she was converted into a pitcher because of her arm strength. She was a .162 career hitter over 114 games, while posting a 1–0 pitching record and a 6.02 earned run average in 15 innings of work.

Dailey was not located after leaving the league in 1951. She died at her hometown Lexington, Massachusetts on her 37th birthday.

Twenty-three years after her death, Mary Dailey became part of Women in Baseball, a permanent display based at the Baseball Hall of Fame and Museum in Cooperstown, New York and unveiled in 1988 to honor the entire All-American Girls Professional Baseball League.

== Career statistics ==
Batting

GP	AB	R	H	2B	3B	HR	RBI	SB	TB	BB	SO	BA	OBP	SLG
114	314	24	51	4	1	0	10	10	57	34	48	.162	.242	.182

Pitching

GP	W	L	W-L%	ERA	IP	H	RA	ER	BB	SO	HBP	WP	WHIP
3	1	0	1.000	6.02	15	18	12	10	10	5	1	0	1.87

Fielding

GP	PO	A	E	TC	DP	FA
113	163	6	9	178	2	.950
