= Terry Donahue (baseball) =

Canadian professional baseball player and accountant (1925–2019)

- Catcher
- Born: Theresa Paz Donahue; August 22, 1925; Saskatchewan, Canada
- Died: March 14, 2019 (aged 93); Edmonton, Alberta, Canada
- Batted: Right Threw: Right

debut
- 1946

Last appearance
- 1949
- Stats at Baseball Reference

Teams
- Peoria Redwings

Career highlights and awards
- Canadian Baseball Hall of Fame (1998); Saskatchewan Baseball Hall of Fame (1998)

Theresa Paz Donahue (August 22, 1925 – March 14, 2019) was a Canadian utility player in women's baseball, playing mainly as a catcher for the Peoria Redwings of the All-American Girls Professional Baseball League from 1946 through 1949. Listed at 5' 2", 125 lb., she batted and threw right-handed.

== Biography ==
Donahue was born in Saskatchewan, Canada, of Irish ancestry. As a young girl she learned to play baseball with the help of her brother in their family farm, and later played softball at school and in Moose Jaw for the local Royals team. In 1945 Donahue was invited by an All-American Girls Professional Baseball League scout to spring training the next year in Pascagoula, Mississippi. She agreed to try out and was assigned to the Redwings, an expansion team based in Peoria, Illinois. During her four seasons in the league, Donahue was primarily a catcher, but played every position except first base and pitcher. She hit .127 in 287 games, and committed 56 errors in 1051 chances for a .947 fielding average.

In 1950 Donahue joined the Admiral Music Maids of the rival National Girls Baseball League in Chicago. After that, she worked for an interior design firm in Chicago in accounting and bookkeeping for 38 years, and then retired in 1990. A longtime resident of St. Charles, Illinois, Donahue carried out her grand marshal duties during the St. Patrick's Day Parade in 2009. She was honored with many recognitions and awards over the years, including inductions in the Canadian Baseball Hall of Fame, and the Saskatchewan Baseball Hall of Fame. She died in March 2019 at the age of 93 after suffering from Parkinson's disease.

In 2020, Netflix released a documentary, A Secret Love, that chronicles Donahue's 72-year relationship with Emma Marie "Pat" Henschel. The couple married on Donahue's birthday in 2015.

== Batting statistics ==
GP	AB	R	H	2B	3B	HR	RBI	SB	TB	BB	SO	BA	OBP	SLG	OPS
287	722	67	92	3	2	0	50	44	99	123	107	.127	.254	.137	.392

== Fielding statistics ==
GP	PO	A	E	TC	DP	FA
258	734	261	56	1051	30	.947
