= Jaynie Krick =

American baseball player (1929–2014)

- Pitcher / Utility infielder
- Born: October 1, 1929; Auburn, Indiana, U.S.
- Died: December 29, 2014 (aged 85); Fort Wayne, Indiana, U.S
- Batted: Both Threw: Right

debut
- 1948

Last appearance
- 1953

Teams
- South Bend Blue Sox (1948–'49); Battle Creek Belles (1951); Peoria Redwings (1951); Grand Rapids Chicks (1952–'53)

Career highlights and awards
- Championship team (1953); Four playoff appearances (1948-'49, 1952-'53)

Jaynie Krick [Red] (October 1, 1929 – December 29, 2014) was an American pitcher and utility infielder who played in the All-American Girls Professional Baseball League between the 1948 and 1953 seasons. She was a switch-hitter and threw right-handed.

Born in Auburn, Indiana, Krick spent five years in the All-American Girls Professional Baseball League playing for four clubs. Since her debut in the league, opponent batters began to respect her flashing fastball. The hard-throwing Krick was hampered by control problems during her career, recording 17 wild pitches and hitting Connie Wisniewski four times in one contest, to set a league career record for the most hit by pitches in a single game.

Krick entered the league in 1948 with the South Bend Blue Sox, playing for them two years before joining the Battle Creek Belles (1951), Peoria Redwings (1951) and Grand Rapids Chicks (1952–1953). She was used mostly as a spot starter, middle reliever and backup infielder. Her most productive came in 1952, when she posted a 2–7 mark in 21 pitching appearances. She also was a member of the 1953 Series Champion Chicks.

In a five-season career, Krick collected an 8–22 record with 118 earned runs and a strikeout-to-walk ratio of 0.51 (97-to-189) in 61 games.

The All-American Girls Professional Baseball League folded in 1954. Lady pitchers, catchers, and fielders drifted into obscurity until 1992 when the film A League of Their Own was released. The film kindled a renewed interest in these trailblazers who have their own places in American history. Since then, Krick and her teammates have become the darlings of the media. They have been honored several times for their significant contributions, responding to request for autographs and corresponding with young athletes interested in hearing of their days in the AAGPBL.

Krick was a longtime resident of Arlington, Texas. Since 1988 she is part of Women in Baseball, a permanent display based at the Baseball Hall of Fame and Museum in Cooperstown, New York, which was unveiled to honor the entire All-American Girls Professional Baseball League rather than individual baseball personalities. Then, in 2005 she threw out the ceremonial first pitch in a Fort Worth Cats game at LaGrave Field in honor of her Bobblehead Doll Day.

Krick moved in her later years to Fort Wayne, Indiana, closer to family. She was hospitalized with pneumonia, and died on December 29, 2014.
