= Barbara Galdonik =

American baseball player

- Third base
- Born: October 26, 1934; Kenosha, Wisconsin, U.S.
- Died: June 30, 2003 (aged 68); Superior, Wisconsin, U.S.
- Batted: Right Threw: Right

Teams
- Kenosha Comets (1950); Battle Creek Belles (1951)

Career highlights and awards
- Women in Baseball – AAGPBL Permanent Display at the Baseball Hall of Fame and Museum (unveiled in 1988)

Barbara Ann Galdonik (October 26, 1934 – December 1, 2003) was an All-American Girls Professional Baseball League player. Listed at 5' 5", 130 lb., she batted and threw right handed.

Born in Kenosha, Wisconsin, Galdonik played at third base for the Kenosha Comets and Battle Creek Belles clubs in a span of two seasons from 1950 to 1951. She did not have individual records or additional information was incomplete at the time of the request.

She died in 2003 in Superior, Wisconsin, at the age of 69.

The All-American Girls Professional Baseball League folded in 1954, but there is a permanent display at the Baseball Hall of Fame and Museum at Cooperstown, New York, since 1988 that honors the entire league rather than any individual figure.
