= Betty Jane Cornett =

All-American Girls Professional Baseball League player

- Third base / Pitcher
- Born: November 24, 1932; Pittsburgh, Pennsylvania, U.S.
- Died: March 18, 2006 (aged 73); Reserve, Pennsylvania, U.S.
- Batted: Right Threw: Right

Teams
- Rockford Peaches (1950); Springfield Sallies (1950); Kalamazoo Lassies (1951); Battle Creek Belles (1952)

Career highlights and awards
- Women in Baseball – AAGPBL Permanent Display at Baseball Hall of Fame and Museum (1988)

Betty Jane Cornett (November 24, 1932 – March 18, 2006) was an infielder and pitcher who played in the All-American Girls Professional Baseball League (AAGPBL). Listed at 5' 5", 125 lb., she batted and threw right handed.

Born in Pittsburgh, Pennsylvania, Betty Jane Cornett was the youngest of 11 children of Francis T. and Stella (née Bentz) Cornett. She attended St. Ambrose, St. Mary's, Latimer and Allegheny high schools. In her spare time, she went to Cowley Recreation Center on Troy Hill enjoying basketball, softball, swimming and ice skating. As a teenager, she was a member of the Pittsburgh Rockets basketball team, even though her favorite pastime was playing softball. She joined the league in 1950 with the Rockford Peaches.

After spring training camp, Rockford decided that Cornett was not ready for the league and sent her to the Springfield Sallies rookie touring team to acquire more experience. In 1951 she was promoted to the Kalamazoo Lassies and was dealt to the Battle Creek Belles before the 1952 season.

Originally an infielder, the Belles turned her into a pitcher for a couple of games with little success, as she posted an 11.26 earned run average in eight innings of work. She was best suited for the third base job, but she hit .147 average in 47 games and Battle Creek did not offer her a contract the next season.

″Curly″, as her teammates called her for her drooping hair, still wanted to play, so she had to wait five years to regain her amateur status again. Then she played successfully in Northwest Ohio, West Virginia and Pennsylvania softball leagues until 1970.

Cornett also worked for H. J. Heinz Company in Pennsylvania during 24 years, retiring in 1987 after being diagnosed with CREST syndrome. After that, she was invited to several AAGPBL Players Association reunions. The association was largely responsible for the opening of Women in Baseball, a permanent display at the Baseball Hall of Fame and Museum at Cooperstown, New York, which was inaugurated in November 1988.

In addition, a photograph of Cornett in her wheelchair is featured at the Western Pennsylvania Sports Museum next to an enlarged copy of her AAGPBL baseball card, while a second-floor display still holds her baseball glove, cap and spikes.

Betty Jane Cornett died in 2006 in Reserve, Pennsylvania at the age of 73, following complications from pulmonary disease.

== Career statistics ==
Batting

GP	AB	R	H	2B	3B	HR	RBI	SB	TB	BB	SO	BA	OBP	SLG
47	114	10	15	2	0	0	6	7	17	BB=18	30	.132	.250	.149

Pitching

GP	W	L	W-L%	ERA	IP	H	RA	ER	BB	SO	HBP	WP	WHIP
2	0	1	.000	11.26	8	12	15	10	12	4	3	0	3.00

Fielding

GP	PO	A	E	TC	DP	FA
39	32	78	18	128	2	.859
