= Phyllis Baker =

- Pitcher
- Born: June 3, 1937; Marshall, Michigan, U.S.
- Died: July 11, 2006 (aged 69); Battle Creek, Michigan, U.S.
- Batted: Right Threw: Right

Teams
- Battle Creek Belles (1952); Muskegon Belles (1953); South Bend Blue Sox (1954); Fort Wayne Daisies (1954)

Career highlights and awards
- Women in Baseball – AAGPBL Permanent Display at Baseball Hall of Fame and Museum (1988)

Phyllis J. Baker [Wise] (June 3, 1937 – July 11, 2006) was a pitcher who played from 1953 through 1954 in the All-American Girls Professional Baseball League (AAGPBL). Listed at 5 ft 8 in (1.73 m), 155 lb, she batted and threw right-handed.

== Life and career ==
A native of Marshall, Michigan, Baker began playing sandlot ball with the neighborhood kids at a very early age, usually in the family yard next to the house at the corner. There was never a parental complaint about the occasional broken window or the ever-present noises, as she said in an interview. She grew up rooting for the Detroit Tigers and her favorite player was Al Kaline.

One evening in 1952, her brother Bud watched the Battle Creek Belles All-American Girls Professional Baseball team play in Battle Creek while his friend Sid announced the game. Bud talked to the public address announcer and went right home to Phyllis and told her she was good enough to play professional baseball, adding that she needed to go over for a tryout. The 15-year-old girl went to a Belles tryout and was signed a contract, spending the year pitching batting practice while attending Marshall High School. In 1953 the team was moved to Muskegon, Michigan where they became the Muskegon Belles.

Baker posted a 7–12 record and a 3.21 earned run average in 28 pitching appearances for Muskegon, who finished 39–70 out of contention. During the midseason she hurled a one-hit shutout against the strong Fort Wayne Daisies, managed by Bill Allington, facing a lineup boosted by sluggers as Wilma Briggs, Betty Foss, Jean Geissinger, Katie Horstman and Joanne Weaver. Daisies manager Allington was impressed with Baker's performance, and considered her the best rookie pitching prospect in that season. In another game, Baker pitched into the eleventh inning and then hit an RBI-single in the bottom of the inning to win the game. At the end of the season the Belles folded, and Baker was sent to the South Bend Blue Sox.

South Bend finished in second place (48–44) in 1954, during what turned out to be the league's final season. The Blue Sox lost in the first round of the playoffs to the eventual champion Kalamazoo Lassies, two to one games. Baker had a 5–11 mark with a 4.81 ERA during the regular season, and was sent to Fort Wayne for the championship playoffs. She pitched two shutout-innings of relief in Game 3 and was credited with the win in an 8–7 victory over the Kalamazoo Lassies. Overall, she made three relief appearances and went 1–0 with a 0.82 ERA in 11 innings of work.

After the league folded, Baker returned to high school and graduated in 1955. She then worked for State Farm Insurance company in Marshall, from which she retired in 1978.

Baker also played guard on the Kalamazoo Lassies basketball teams for four years, coached women's teams in Rice Creek league play, and worked for a short time in Battle Creek. A cancer survivor, she continued to play fast pitch softball with a Kalamazoo team and various Marshall area teams until she was 48, usually pitching, but sometimes playing at first base or third base.

In 1961, she married Clifton Wise, a softball coach and former baseball player, and helped him coach Marshall High School Girl Redskin Softball teams for 13 years. They retired in 1996 and moved to Battle Creek, Michigan, where she died at the age of 69.

== Pitching statistics ==
GP	W	L	W-L%	ERA	IP	H	RA	ER	BB	SO	WHIP
28	7	12	.368	3.21	188	161	84	67	88	36	1.32
