= Betty McKenna =

- Third baseman
- Born: May 31, 1931; Lisbon, Ohio, U.S.
- Died: February 24, 1992 (aged 60); Ohio, U.S.
- Batted: Right Threw: Right

debut
- 1951, for the Fort Wayne Daisies

Last appearance
- 1953, for the Muskegon Belles

Career statistics
- Batting average: .186
- Runs scored: 71
- Hits: 89
- Runs batted in: 42
- Games played: 166

Teams
- Fort Wayne Daisies (1951); Peoria Redwings (1951); Battle Creek Belles (1951–'52); Muskegon Belles (1953)

Betty McKenna [Mac] (May 31, 1931 – February 24, 1992) was an American third basewoman who played from 1951 through 1953 in the All-American Girls Professional Baseball League (AAGPBL). McKenna batted and threw right-handed. She was born in Lisbon, Ohio.

A solid all-around athlete, McKenna got off to a slow start in the AAGPBL in her rookie season. She entered the league in 1951 with the Fort Wayne Daisies, playing for them in a few games before joining the Peoria Redwings during the midseason and ending the year with the Battle Creek Belles, batting .151 in 61 games, including six doubles and one triple.

After hitting .077 in 1952 in just 61 games, McKenna moved with the Belles when they relocated to Muskegon, Michigan before the 1953 season. This time she took over the full-time role at third base and blossomed into one of the better defenders of the hot corner in the league, setting career-numbers in average (.215), hits (63), runs (31), runs batted in (28), stolen bases (16) and games (94). Still only 22 years old, she was becoming a full-fledged star player, but the Belles, after two championship titles in the 1940s and two reincarnations in the 1950s, folded after the 1953 season while the AAGPBL, too, folded a year later.

McKenna died in Ohio at the age of 60.

== Sources ==
- Encyclopedia of women and baseball - Leslie A. Heaphy, Mel Anthony May. Publisher: McFarland & Co., 2006. Format: Paperback, 438 pp. Language: English. ISBN 0-7864-2100-2 ISBN 978-0-7864-2100-8
- The Women of the All-American Girls Professional Baseball League: A biographical dictionary - W. C. Madden. Publisher: McFarland & Co., 1997. Format: Paperback, 295 pp. Language: English. ISBN 0-7864-0304-7 ISBN 978-0-7864-0304-2
