= Margaret Russo =

- Shortstop
- Born: September 29, 1931; Milton, New York, U.S.
- Died: June 26, 2006 (aged 74); Milton, New York, U.S.
- Batted: Right Threw: Right
- Stats at Baseball Reference

Teams
- Peoria Redwings (1950–1951); Battle Creek Belles (1952); Muskegon Belles (1953); Rockford Peaches (1954)

Career highlights and awards
- Two-time All-Star Team (1953–1954); Two-time leader in fielding average (1952, 1954); Women in Baseball – AAGPBL Permanent Display Baseball Hall of Fame and Museum (1988)

Margaret Russo [m. 1986 Jones] (September 29, 1931 – June 26, 2006) was a shortstop who played from 1950 through 1954 in the All-American Girls Professional Baseball League (AAGPBL). Listed at 5 ft 4 in (1.63 m), 130 lb., she batted and threw right-handed.

A two-time All Star, Margaret Russo was a consistent defensive player and a solid hitter in the AAGPBL during the final five years of its existence. Russo led all shortstops in the league in fielding average during two seasons, while converting 138 double plays in 497 career games. A valuable contact hitter, she was usually able to put the ball in play while working counts and seldom striking out, collecting a .332 on-base percentage and a 1.71 walk-to-strikeout ratio. Additionally, she overcame the disadvantages of moving from one place to another constantly, playing with four teams in four different cities while adjusting to new teammates, as the league switched players as needed to help teams to be competitive.

Born in Milton, New York, Russo graduated from Marlboro High School in 1949. Previous to her baseball career, she worked for a while in a print shop and for a local winery. She entered the league in 1950 with the Peoria Redwings, playing for them two years before joining the Battle Creek Belles (1952), Muskegon Belles (1953) and Rockford Peaches (1954).

In her rookie season of 1950, Russo had a batting average of .132 in 93 games. She improved in 1951, batting .247 with 66 runs and 22 stolen bases in 106 games, including six doubles, four triples and two home runs, while ranking 10th in the league with 51 runs batted in, and turned in 25 double plays with a .918 fielding average.

In 1952, Russo dropped to .222, 39 runs and 28 RBI, though she belted 13 doubles, three triples and one home run. But she committed only 37 errors at shortstop to lead the league with a .928 average.

Russo played a career-high 112 games in 1953, batting .226 with nine doubles, nine triples and a homer, while driving in 29 runs and scoring 65 times. She ended 6th best with 45 stolen bases, also a career-high, and collected a .918 fielding average with 33 double plays. In addition, she was selected for the All-Star Team.

During the league's final season of 1954, Russo posted career numbers with a .313 average, 10 home runs, and 67 runs scored (9th best), driving in 35 runs and stealing 17 bases (9th best). As an added value, she hit three home runs in a single game, and for the second time led shortstops in fielding average (.938) and joined the All-Star Team. She also converted 43 double plays, for the second highest single-season total in the history of the league.

After the league folded, Russo went on to Ithaca College for her bachelor's in physical education in 1955 and her master's in education in 1962. She stayed active playing basketball and softball while teaching physical education, and married Fred Jones in 1986.

Since 1988, Russo is part of Women in Baseball, a permanent display based at the Baseball Hall of Fame and Museum in Cooperstown, New York, which was unveiled to honor the entire All-American Girls Professional Baseball League rather than individual baseball personalities. She died in her homeland of Milton, New York, at the age of 74.

== Career statistics ==
Batting

GP	AB	R	H	2B	3B	HR	RBI	SB	BB	SO	BA	OBP	SLG
501	1640	251	377	39	19	15	166	104	251	147	.230	.332	.304

Fielding

GP	PO	A	E	TC	DP	FA
497	911	1424	202	2535	138	.886
