= Mary Flaherty (baseball) =

American baseball player

- Pitcher / Third base
- Born: February 7, 1926; Ozone Park, Queens, New York, U.S.
- Died: March 30, 2000 (aged 74); Vero Beach, Florida, U.S.
- Batted: Right Threw: Right

Teams
- Racine Belles (1948); Peoria Redwings (1949)

Career highlights and awards
- Women in Baseball – AAGPBL Permanent Display at the Baseball Hall of Fame and Museum (unveiled in 1988)

Mary "Irish" Flaherty (February 7, 1926 – March 30, 2000) was an All-American Girls Professional Baseball League player. She batted and threw right handed.

Born in Ozone Park, New York, Mary Flaherty was approached by an All American League scout while playing in a fastpitch softball league in New Jersey.

As a result, Flaherty was assigned to be a pitcher and play at third base for the Racine Belles and Peoria Redwings clubs in a span of two seasons from 1948 to 1949. She did not have individual records or additional information was incomplete at the time of the request. Afterwards, she worked for Manufacturers and Traders Trust Company in Long Island City.

Mary Flaherty died in 2000 in Vero Beach, Florida, at the age of 74. The All-American Girls Professional Baseball League folded in 1954, but there is a permanent display at the Baseball Hall of Fame and Museum at Cooperstown, New York, since 1988 that honors the entire league rather than any individual figure.
