= Frances Lovett =

American baseball player

- Pitcher
- Born: Racine, Wisconsin, US
- Bats: Right Throws: Right

Teams
- Peoria Redwings (1946)

Frances Lovett was a pitcher who played in the All-American Girls Professional Baseball League (AAGPBL). She batted and threw right handed.

Born in Racine, Wisconsin, Frances Lovett joined the All American League in its 1946 season. She was assigned to the Peoria Redwings club and made one pitching appearance for them.

Lovett allowed 12 runs on 13 hits and two walks without strikeouts over seven innings of work, and was credited with the loss. As a hitter, she went 0 for 2 in two at bats.

The league folded in 1954, but there is a permanent display at the Baseball Hall of Fame and Museum at Cooperstown, New York, since 1988 that honors the entire league rather than any individual figure.
