= Florence Bucior =

American baseball player

Teams
- Peoria Redwings (1946)

Career highlights and awards
- Women in Baseball – AAGPBL Permanent Display at Baseball Hall of Fame and Museum (since 1988)

Florence H. Bucior (October 29, 1920 – November 13, 2005) was an All-American Girls Professional Baseball League player. She was born in Jackson, Michigan.

Bucior is part of the AAGPBL permanent display at the Baseball Hall of Fame and Museum at Cooperstown, New York, opened in 1988, which is dedicated to the entire league rather than any individual figure.

Bucior died on November 13, 2005, at the age of 85.

== Notes ==
Bucior appears as a member of the Peoria Redwings club during its 1946 inaugural season. Nevertheless, the league did not have additional information about her, and requires if someone has information regarding this player, please contact them at their website.
