= Gloria Dougal =

American baseball player (1931–2014)

- Born: January 9, 1931; Muskegon, Michigan, U.S.
- Died: September 24, 2014 (aged 83)

Teams
- Muskegon Belles (1953)

Career highlights and awards
- Women in Baseball – AAGPBL Permanent Display at the Baseball Hall of Fame and Museum (unveiled in 1988)

Gloria Dougal (January 9, 1931 – September 24, 2014) was an All-American Girls Professional Baseball League player.

According to All-American League data, she was assigned to the Muskegon Belles club during its 1953 season.

Nevertheless, the league stopped individual achievements after 1948, so individual accomplishments and additional information are complete only through 1948.

In 1988 was inaugurated a permanent display at the Baseball Hall of Fame and Museum at Cooperstown, New York, that honors those who were part of the All-American Girls Professional Baseball League. Dougal, along with the rest of the girls and the league staff, is included at the display/exhibit.
