= Joyce Hill =

American baseball player (1925–2021)

- Catcher / First base
- Born: December 29, 1925; Kenosha, Wisconsin, U.S.
- Died: January 18, 2021 (aged 95); Kenosha, Wisconsin, U.S.
- Batted: Left Threw: Right

Teams
- Grand Rapids Chicks (1945); South Bend Blue Sox (1946, 1952); Fort Wayne Daisies (1946); Peoria Redwings (1947–1948, 1950–1951); Racine Belles (1948–1949)

Career highlights and awards
- Championship Team (1952); Two postseason appearances (1948, 1952); Women in Baseball – AAGPBL Permanent Display at Baseball Hall of Fame and Museum (1988)

Joyce Elaine Westerman (née Hill; December 29, 1925 – January 18, 2021) was a catcher who played from 1945 through 1952 in the All-American Girls Professional Baseball League (AAGPBL). Listed at 5 ft 5 in (1.65 m), 150 lb., she batted left-handed and threw right-handed.

== Biography ==
Hill was born in Kenosha, Wisconsin and grew up on the Clausen-Hill farm in Pleasant Prairie. Hill did not play any sports at Kenosha High School because they had none for girls. She acquired softball experience while playing in the county softball league for 12-to 15-year-olds and then in an industrial league for two years. In Kenosha, she gained a good reputation as a hard throwing pitcher and shortstop for the team of Nash Motors, which later bought Hudson Company to found American Motors.

Hill entered the league in 1945 with the Grand Rapids Chicks, but was converted into a catcher. She was a force behind the plate and had capacity as a left-handed hitter to drive the long ball. Nevertheless, Hill was traded six times in a span of eight years because each season the league would move players to try to keep teams competitive. So, in 1946, she divided her playing time between the South Bend Blue Sox and the Fort Wayne Daisies, before stabilizing with the Peoria Redwings the next year.

Hill became the everyday catcher for Peoria in 1947. While she turned in a good defensive performance, she also showed a strong throwing arm and the ability to get the most out of a pitching staff. She then found herself on the move again, this time to the Racine Belles during the 1948 midseason. Through 1949 she shared catching duties with Irene Hickson, returning to Peoria from 1950 to 1951. While Hill loved to catch, she also suffered a litany of injuries that hurt her play. She recalled one game in which she had four broken fingers taped on her throwing hand. During the off-season, she continued to work for the Nash Company.

Following the 1950 season, Hill and Raymond A. Westerman were married in Kenosha, the couple's home town. During her last two seasons in the league she played under her married name, Joyce Westerman, but her days of catching were over and she had to switch to first base and, eventually, to play outfield. Her most productive year came with Peoria in 1951, when she posted career-numbers in batting average (.277), runs scored (51), hits (86), extra bases (105), runs batted in (50) and stolen bases (20).

Joyce rejoined the Blue Sox during her last year in the league. Near to the end of the 1952 season, a South Bend team decimated by injuries had lost six regular players. Then she won a decisive game with a walk-off RBI single in the bottom of the ninth inning. The Blue Sox relied on their ace pitcher, Jean Faut, to finish off Grand Rapids in the first round of the playoffs, and win the championship title against the Rockford Peaches.

Hill retired after 1952 to become a mother and raise a family of two daughters, Janet and Judy, both of whom became ball players. She later went to work for the United States Postal Service, retiring in 1985. She also played fast-pitch softball from 1960 to 1975, becoming a member of several championship teams. Hill, along with her former teammates and opponents, received their long overdue recognition when the Baseball Hall of Fame and Museum dedicated a permanent display to the All American Girls Professional Baseball League in 1988. When the 1992 film A League of Their Own was filmed at Cooperstown, she was one of the women who appeared for the last segment of the movie. Widowed in 2005, she lived in Kenosha as of 2005. She died on January 18, 2021.

== Career statistics ==
Batting

| GP | AB | R | H | 2B | 3B | HR | RBI | SB | TB | BB | SO | BA | OBP | SLG |
|---|---|---|---|---|---|---|---|---|---|---|---|---|---|---|
| 531 | 1515 | 191 | 345 | 34 | 14 | 0 | 167 | 81 | 407 | 292 | 149 | .228 | .353 | .269 |

Fielding

| GP | PO | A | E | TC | DP | FA |
|---|---|---|---|---|---|---|
| 478 | 2714 | 208 | 94 | 3016 | 82 | .969 |
