= Barbara Hines (baseball) =

American baseball player

Teams
- Peoria Redwings (1951)

Career highlights and awards
- Women in Baseball – AAGPBL Permanent Display at the Baseball Hall of Fame and Museum (unveiled in 1988)

Barbara Hines was an All-American Girls Professional Baseball League player.

According to All-American League data, Barbara Hines played for the Peoria Redwings club in the 1951 season. Additional information is incomplete because there are no records available at the time of the request.

The All-American Girls Professional Baseball League folded in 1954, but there is a permanent display at the Baseball Hall of Fame and Museum at Cooperstown, New York, since 1988 that honors the entire league rather than any individual figure.
