= Doris Witiuk =

Doris Shero
- Outfielder
- Born: May 22, 1929; Winnipeg, Manitoba, Canada
- Died: January 26, 2014 (aged 84); Winnipeg, Manitoba, Canada
- Batted: Right Threw: Right

Teams
- Racine Belles (1950); Battle Creek Belles (1951)

Career highlights and awards
- Canadian Baseball Hall of Fame Honorary Induction (1988)

Doris Witiuk [Shero] (May 22, 1929 – January 26, 2014) was a Canadian outfielder who played in the All-American Girls Professional Baseball League (AAGPBL) in 1950 and 1951. She played under her maiden name of Doris Shero.

With the Racine Belles in 1950, Doris hit .093 with 10 stolen bases in 83 games. She had 18 hits in 194 at-bats. In 1951, with the Battle Creek Belles, she hit .100, with four hits in 40 at-bats.

The AAGPBL folded in 1954, but there is a permanent display at the Baseball Hall of Fame and Museum at Cooperstown, New York, since November 5, 1988, that honors the entire league rather than any individual figure. Then in 1998, Doris and all Canadian AAGPBL players gained honorary induction into the Canadian Baseball Hall of Fame.

== Personal life ==
Her husband was National Hockey League player Steve Witiuk. Her brother is hockey player Fred Shero, while her nephew is hockey executive Ray Shero.
