= Kathryn Vonderau =

American baseball player (1927–2022)

- Catcher
- Born: 26 September 1927; Fort Wayne, Indiana, U.S.
- Died: August 10, 2022 (aged 94)
- Batted: Right Threw: Right

Teams
- Fort Wayne Daisies (1946, 1950–1952); Chicago Colleens (1948); Peoria Redwings (1948–1949); Muskegon Lassies (1949); Muskegon Belles (1953)

Career highlights and awards
- All-Star Team (1953); Five playoff appearances (1948–1952); Women in Baseball – AAGPBL Permanent Display Baseball Hall of Fame and Museum (1988)

Kathryn E. Vonderau (born September 26, 1927 - August 10, 2022) was an American catcher who played from 1946 through 1953 in the All-American Girls Professional Baseball League (AAGPBL). Listed at 5 ft 7 in (1.70 m), 155 lb., she batted and threw right-handed.

Kathryn Vonderau was an integral part of multiple playoff teams with her leadership. More important than her offensive numbers, Vonderau was a fine receiver with a quick throwing arm and a fine glove during her eight seasons in the league. After retiring from baseball, she had a successful career as an educator for thirty-one years.

Born in Fort Wayne, Indiana, Vonderau caught and played at first base for a fast-pitch softball champion team sponsored by Harold Greiner, owner of the Bob-Inn Restaurant in Fort Wayne. The team won state championship titles in 1944 and 1945, while Greiner, who scouted for the All-American Girls Professional Baseball League, recommended Vonderau for the league's tryouts. She joined the league in 1946, following her high school graduation at Elmhurst High School, and was assigned to her hometown team, the Fort Wayne Daisies. But then the league started shuffling her around to fill in where she was needed.

For the next three seasons, Vonderau divided her playing time with the Muskegon Lassies (1947), Chicago Colleens (1948) and Peoria Redwings (1948–1949). She suffered a knee injury in 1948 while playing for Peoria, which somewhat limited her playing time for the rest of her career.

Vonderau returned to the Daisies in 1950, playing for them through 1952, when she helped Fort Wayne win the pennant. She was then sent to the Muskegon Belles in 1953, her last year in the circuit. Her most productive season came in 1951, when she posted career numbers with a .221 batting average, 32 runs batted in and 24 runs scored. She also gained a spot in the 1953 All-Star Team.

Following her baseball career, Vondearau had a teaching career at all academic levels from elementary through university as a Health, Physical Education and Recreation educator. Her academic honors include bachelor's and master's degrees from Indiana University Bloomington and a doctorate from University of Iowa. She retired from the University of Wisconsin–Whitewater in 1988.

She is included in Women in Baseball, a permanent display based at the Baseball Hall of Fame and Museum in Cooperstown, New York, which was unveiled to honor the entire All-American Girls Professional Baseball League rather than individual baseball personalities. She also gained induction into the Wisconsin–Whitewater Hall of Fame in 1996.

Vonderau died on August 10, 2022.

== Career statistics ==
Batting

GP	AB	R	H	2B	3B	HR	RBI	SB	BB	SO	BA	OBP	SLG
642	2038	147	385	42	9	1	169	46	129	184	.189	.237	.220

Fielding

GP	PO	A	E	TC	DP	FA
626	2444	563	178	3185	66	.944
