= Ruth Middleton =

Canadian baseball player

Ruth Middleton (later Gentry; August 25, 1930 – May 13, 2008) both played and batted right-handed in the All-American Girls Professional Baseball League between 1950 and 1953.

The Winnipeg, Manitoba, Canada-born Middleton was scouted out by the League and played first for the Chicago Colleens in 1950. A year later she moved over to play for the Battle Creek Belles where she remained until 1952. Ruth ended her career with the League playing with the Muskegon Belles in 1953. After she ended her baseball career with the League, she went to live in Indiana, taking on a job as a bookkeeper for Yoder Ford, based in Garrett, Indiana. On October 13, 1972, she married Jerry Gentry.

In June 1998, Middleton — along with 63 other Canadian women baseball players from the All American Girls Professional Baseball League—was inducted into the Canadian Baseball Hall of Fame.

Ruth Middleton Gentry died in Indiana on May 13, 2008, aged 77. Her death was included in the Famous Canadian Women's Historic Timeline.

== Career statistics ==
Batting

Year	GP	AB	R	H	2B	3B	HR	RBI	SB	TB	BB	SO	BA	OBP	SLG
1950	73	281	49	64	6	9	0	33	17	88	46	25	.228	.336	.313
1951	10	-	-	-	-	-	-	-	-	-	-	-	-	-	-
1952	86	160	16	22	3	0	0	10	6	25	24	32	.138	.250	.156
1953	36	72	9	9	0	0	0	2	2	9	7	9	.125	.203	.125
