= Harold Greiner =

American restaurateur, baseball and softball coach

- Manager
- Born: July 7, 1907; Fort Wayne, Indiana, U.S.
- Died: July 17, 1993 (aged 86); Fort Wayne, Indiana, U.S.
- Batted: n/a Threw: n/a

Career statistics
- Managing record: 52-57
- W-L%: .477
- Games behind: 23
- Place: 5th

Teams
- Fort Wayne Daisies (1949)

Career highlights and awards
- Women in Baseball – AAGPBL Permanent Display Baseball Hall of Fame and Museum (1988)

Harold Greiner (July 7, 1907 – July 17, 1993) was a restaurant entrepreneur, baseball manager and softball coach.

Born in Fort Wayne, Indiana, Greiner was the owner of Bob Inn Restaurant and Bakery. He also coached softball for ten years and sponsored a women's team that won state fastpitch softball titles in 1944 and 1945.

In addition, Greiner scouted for the All-American Girls Professional Baseball League and contributed to bringing the Fort Wayne Daisies to his hometown in 1945. He later became part of the AAGPBL board of directors and then managed the Daisies during the 1949 season. Some of the players recruited by Greiner for the league include Maxine Kline, June Peppas and Kathryn Vonderau, among others.

Greiner appears in the documentary A League of Their Own, aired on PBS in 1987, which inspired a film with the same title released in 1992. Both the documentary and the film brought a rejuvenated interest to the extinct baseball circuit. Then, the AAGPBL received their long overdue recognition in 1988, when the Baseball Hall of Fame and Museum dedicated a permanent display in Cooperstown, New York to honor the entire league rather than individual baseball personalities.
