= Patricia Barringer =

American baseball player

- Second base / Chaperone / Manager
- Born: September 14, 1924; New Carlisle, Ohio, U.S.
- Died: March 31, 2007 (aged 82); Port Charlotte, Florida, U.S.
- Batted: Right Threw: Right

Teams
- Muskegon Lassies (1947); Chicago Colleens (1948–1950); Battle Creek Belles (1951–1952); Muskegon Belles (1953)

Career highlights and awards
- Women in Baseball – AAGPBL Permanent Display at Baseball Hall of Fame and Museum (1988)

Patricia Barringer (September 14, 1924 – March 31, 2007) was an All-American Girls Professional Baseball League ballplayer. Listed at 5' 7", 145 lb., she batted and threw right handed.

Born in New Carlisle, Ohio, Patricia Barringer attended Ohio State University. She was interested in sports since her childhood. In the 1940s, she held a national Amateur Athletic Union swimming record and trained under guidance of former Olympic gold medal winner Johnny Weissmuller. She also was active in snowmobiling, waterskiing and bowling.

Barringer entered the league in 1947 with the Muskegon Lassies, playing a few games at second base before becoming a chaperone for the next six years.

She opened 1948 with the Chicago Colleens, and agreed to manage and serve as chaperone for them when it was converted into a player development team. Another former second base player, Barbara Liebrich, was named chaperone-manager for the Springfield Sallies.

From 1949 through 1950, both teams played an extensive exhibition schedule against each other through the South and East, including contests at Griffith Stadium in Washington, D.C., and Yankee Stadium in New York City.

She returned to league action as chaperone for the 1951–1952 Battle Creek Belles and for the 1953 Muskegon Belles.

After baseball, she spent thirty years in the financial field as an auditor and tax accountant.

In 1988, she received further recognition when she became part of Women in Baseball, a permanent display based at the Baseball Hall of Fame and Museum in Cooperstown, New York, which was unveiled to honor the entire All-American Girls Professional Baseball League.

Barringer was a longtime resident of Port Charlotte, Florida, where she died in 2007 at the age of 82.
