= Mary Carey (baseball) =

- Infield utility / Manager
- Born: September 8, 1925; Detroit, Michigan, U.S.
- Died: January 1, 1977 (aged 51); Detroit, Michigan, U.S.
- Batted: Right Threw: Right

Teams
- Kenosha Comets (1946); Peoria Redwings (1947–1951); Kalamazoo Lassies (1952–1953); Muskegon Belles (1953); Rockford Peaches (1953); South Bend Blue Sox (1954)

Career highlights and awards
- Three postseason appearances (1948, 1953–1954); Women in Baseball – AAGPBL Permanent Display at Baseball Hall of Fame and Museum (1988)

Mary "Pepper" Carey (September 8, 1925 – January 1, 1977) was a utility infielder who played from 1946 through 1954 in the All-American Girls Professional Baseball League (AAGPBL). Listed at 5 ft 3 in (1.60 m), 135 lb., Carey batted and threw right-handed. She was born in Detroit, Michigan.

Mary Carey was a dependable infielder during her nine years in the league. A solid fielder with sure hands and a good throwing arm, she saw action at third base, shortstop and second base for six different teams.

Her most productive season at the plate came with the Peoria Redwings in 1950, when she posted career numbers with a .235 average, 97 hits, 14 extrabases and 54 runs scored. She also co-managed the team that year as well.

She is part of Women in Baseball, a permanent display at the Baseball Hall of Fame and Museum at Cooperstown, New York unveiled in 1988, which is dedicated to the entire All-American Girls Professional Baseball League.

Mary Carey died in 1977 in her homeland of Detroit, Michigan, at the age of 51.

== Career statistics ==
Batting

GP	AB	R	H	2B	3B	HR	RBI	SB	TB	BB	SO	BA	OBP	SLG	OPS
596	2807	281	523	41	9	2	169	198	588	263	255	.186	.256	.209	.466

Fielding

GP	PO	A	E	TC	DP	FA
734	1065	1761	307	3133	169	.902
