= Barbara Hines (lawyer) =

American immigration rights attorney

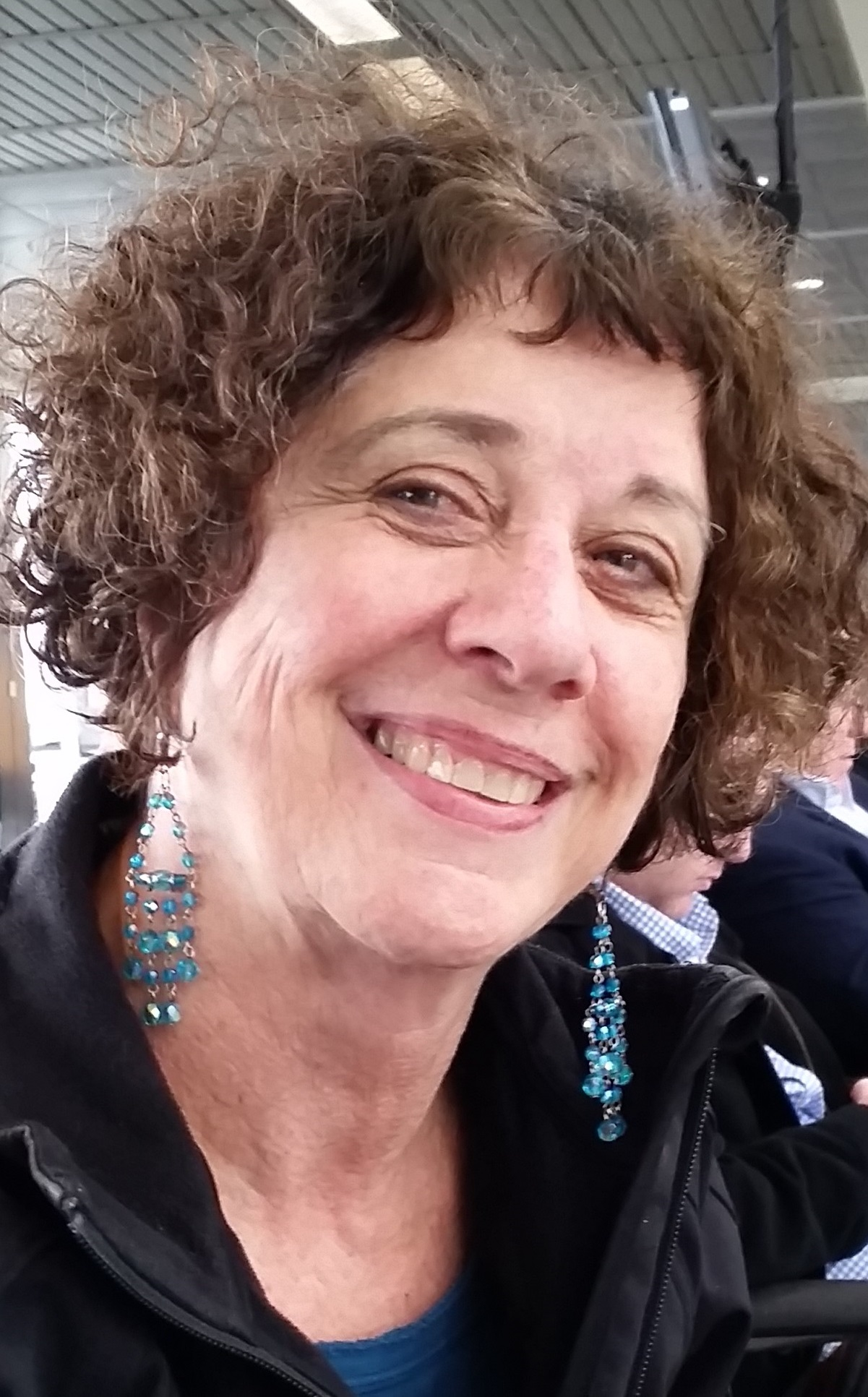
Barbara Hines in 2015

Barbara Hines is an American immigration rights attorney. She is the founder of the University of Texas Law School immigration clinic. Hines is recognized for her defense of the rights of immigrants, coming to national attention for her work in winning the release of families detained in the T. Don Hutto Residential Center in Taylor, Texas in 2008.

== Immigration Law ==
Hines work on immigration rights began in 1975 when she joined Legal Aid of Travis County. Because she was fluent in Spanish, she was assigned immigration cases, an area in which she had no experience. Subsequently immigration law became her professional and personal focus. Hines began teaching law in 1999 and founded the Immigration Law Clinic at the UT law school in 2007. Subsequently, she trained hundreds of students by providing them primary responsibility for actual immigrant cases.

Hines came to national attention for her leadership role in challenging the detention of women and children at the T. Don Hutto Residential Center in Taylor, Texas. The detention center held families with young children under controversial circumstances. After a visit to the detention center in 2006, Hines reported a sense of desperation, with children in prison scrubs, with virtually no education being provided. Pressure from Barbara Hines and her UT law students enabled the ACLU to settle a lawsuit against the government in 2008. Infants and children were released from the T. Don Hutto detention center and children are no longer held at the facility.

Hines serves on the board of numerous immigration organizations and has authored many immigration law articles, including 'Basics of Immigration Law for Texas Criminal Defense Attorneys'.

== Early years ==
Hines was born in Chicago, the daughter of first generation Jews who had fled Nazi Germany. Her family moved to Brownsville, Texas when she was nine. The border became a significant part of these formative years. Hines attended the University of Texas where she was a staff member of The Rag, an underground newspaper. She was also a student anti-war activist and involved in the women's movement working to challenge Texas abortion laws. Hines worked with the referral project which helped women seeking abortions. During that time, she was under surveillance by the FBI. Hines assisted with research which influenced the Roe brief of Roe v. Wade, the landmark United States Supreme Court decision on the issue of abortion.

A 2025 documentary, Lone Star Three, tells the story of Hines and two other UT undergraduate students, Judy Smith and Victoria Foe, and their efforts to support birth control access. It explores how this directly led Sarah Weddington becoming involved, leading her to argue Roe v. Wade before the Supreme Court.

== Education and professional achievement ==
Hines earned a B.A. with honors in Latin American studies from UT-Austin in 1969. After graduating, she chose law school to continue her work in social justice and began studying law at UT in 1972. She transferred to Boston's Northeastern University, where in 1975 she received her J.D. before returning to Texas. Hines was a Fulbright scholar in Argentina in 1996 and 2004. She is the founder of the University of Texas Law School immigration clinic. Hines has been recognized by the American Immigration Lawyers Association, winning the 1992 Jack Wasserman Award for Excellence in Litigation and the 2007 Elmer Fried Excellence in Teaching Award. In 2000, she was recognized by the Texas Lawyer magazine as one of the 100 Legal Legends of the Twentieth Century. The National Lawyer's Guild Immigration Project awarded Hines the 2010 Carol King Award. In 2015, she was recognized with the University of Texas School of Law Massey Teaching Excellence Award.

== After UT retirement ==
Hines retired from her position as clinical law professor at the University of Texas Law School in December 2014. She continues to work pro bono on immigration issues, notably the family detention that began in the summer of 2014.

Hines took up the issue of Texas non-resident school tuition in 2025, clarifying how higher education schools can use Texas Department of Public Safety guidance to determine lawful presence, a requirement to qualify for in-state tuition. She explained that it includes a broad range of categories, including DACA (Deferred Action for Childhood Arrivals), Temporary Protected Status, and people who have filed for immigration benefits. Hines noted that some universities were using outdated regulations that were implemented before the Texas Dream Act.
