= Mary Rountree =

- Catcher
- Born: July 23, 1922; Miami, Florida, U.S.
- Died: August 7, 2007 (aged 85); Highland Beach, Florida, U.S.
- Batted: Right Threw: Right

Teams
- Peoria Redwings (1946); Fort Wayne Daisies (1947–1952); Grand Rapids Chicks (1952)

Mary Ellen Rountree (July 23, 1922 – August 7, 2007) was a catcher who played from 1946 through 1952 in the All-American Girls Professional Baseball League (AAGPBL). Listed at 5 ft 5 in (1.65 m) and 125 pounds (57 kg), she batted and threw right-handed.

Nicknamed "Square Bush", Mary Rountree was one of the top five defensive catchers in the All-American Girls Professional Baseball League during its twelve years of history. Rountree was magnificent at all the intangible things that a catcher does, like calling the game, working the pitch counts and blocking home plate, which combined with a fine defense and a strong and secure throwing arm. She led the league in fielding average two times, while her .959 career fielding average ranks her third in the all-time list behind Ruth Lessing (.973) and Ruth Richard (.961) and over Mary Baker (.953) and Dorothy Maguire (.928). After baseball, she went on to become a specialist in internal medicine, a distinction held by few players.

Born in Miami, Florida, she was the youngest child in the family of Samuel and Mary Rountree. She wore his first baseball uniform at age five, emulating her older brother who was a catcher. As a teenager, Rountree played on two Florida championship teams in 1938 and 1940 that went to play in national tournaments both years.

After graduating from Miami Edison High School, Rountree attended Florida State University for two years, and worked for the United States Department of State in Washington, D.C. In 1943 she received a call from AAGPBL executive Arthur Meyerhoff to join the new league, but she declined the offer because she had three brothers serving in the military during World War II. At the end of the war, she attended a AAGPBL tryout in Miami for Max Carey and was a signed to a contract.

Rountree entered the league in 1946 with the Peoria Redwings, playing for them one year before joining the Fort Wayne Daisies (1947–1952) and the Grand Rapids Chicks (1952). During the off-season, she pursued a medical degree and did not show up until a month into the regular season.

In 1949, Rountree led all catchers with a .976 fielding average after committing just eight errors in 336 total chances. Then, in 1952 she committed only four errors in 280 chances for a league-best .986 average. Her most productive season came in 1946, where she posted career numbers in hits (63), runs (22), stolen bases (27) and RBI (41), while hitting a .216 batting average. She also made four postseason appearances, but her teams never won a championship.

Her baseball career helped finance her studies at the Bowman Gray School of Medicine in Winston-Salem, North Carolina, where she received her Doctor of Medicine degree in 1956. Rountree finished her undergraduate degree at the University of Miami, with a degree in chemistry, and finished her residence at Jackson Memorial Hospital and Veterans Administration Hospital in 1960. From 1966 to 1968, she completed her residency in anesthesiology.

Rountree enjoyed a 32-year career in medicine, including 17 years of teaching. She loved being a doctor and even after retirement continued to care for her many friends and family members.

In 1988 she became part of Women in Baseball, a permanent display based at the Baseball Hall of Fame and Museum in Cooperstown, New York, which was unveiled to honor the entire All-American Girls Professional Baseball League rather than any individual personality.

During an interview, Rountree talked about her experience in the AAGPBL helped her become a better doctor:

My ballplaying was absolutely magnificent for me. You had to meet a lot of people so you learned to get over your stage fright, your bashfulness. Because you had to do personal appearances, you overcame your inability to talk the people in a very quick amount of time. I think that it allowed me to be totally at home with patients. It gave you a chance to develop your personality.

Mary Rountree died in 2007 in Highland Beach, Florida, where she lived, at the age of 85.

== Career statistics ==
Batting

GP	AB	R	H	2B	3B	HR	RBI	SB	TB	BB	SO	BA	OBP	SLG
422	1211	105	250	14	6	0	107	89	276	166	86	.206	.302	.228

Fielding

GP	PO	A	E	TC	DP	FA
406	1644	386	88	2118	40	.959
