= Gertrude Ganote =

- First base / Pitcher
- Born: February 17, 1920; Louisville, Kentucky, U.S.
- Died: February 17, 2006 (aged 86); Louisville, Kentucky, U.S.
- Batted: Left Threw: Left

Teams
- Kenosha Comets (1944); South Bend Blue Sox (1945)

Career highlights and awards
- Best season fielding average at first base (1944); Post season appearance (1944); Women in Baseball – AAGPBL Permanent Display at Baseball Hall of Fame and Museum (1988)

Gertrude Ganote (later Weise; February 17, 1920 – February 17, 2006) was an infielder and pitcher who played from 1944 through 1945 in the All-American Girls Professional Baseball League (AAGPBL). Listed at 5 ft 2 in (1.57 m), 134 lb, Ganote batted and threw left-handed. She was nicknamed "Lefty".

Born in Louisville, Kentucky, she played softball in the local Girls Athletic Association (GAA) during her high school years. She learned her baseball skills from her father, who was a professional ballplayer. After graduating from Louisville Girls High School, Ganote worked in a printing company. In 1944, she decided to drive from Louisville to Wrigley Field in Chicago to attend a tryout for the All-American Girls Professional Baseball League. She was joined in the trip by fellow pitcher Anna Mae Hutchison, who also played with her for the Camera Corner Louisville championship team. Both girls made the final cut. Ganote was assigned to the Kenosha Comets, while Hutchison was allocated to the Racine Belles.

Ganote had some trouble making contact with the bat in her rookie season, as she led the league in most strikeouts (60). She batted a low .133 average, but collected a .229 on-base percentage and stole 24 bases, while posting a pitching record of 4–6 with a solid 3.26 ERA. But none of that really mattered, as she committed only 10 errors in 847 fielding chances at first base for a .988 fielding average to set a league single-season record. Her record remained intact until 1949, when Rockford Peaches' Dorothy Kamenshek set an all-time record with a .995 mark.

Kenosha won the first half of the season and faced the second-half winning Milwaukee Chicks in the 1944 Scholarship Series. The series went to the limit of seven games and Milwaukee clinched the championship, four to three. Ganote played in all seven games and hit .241 (7-for-29) with two runs and one RBI. Ganote opened 1945 with the South Bend Blue Sox. She hit .192 in 82 games, and went 2–2 with a 4.42 ERA in 10 pitching appearances.

During her two years in the AAGPBL, Ganote played excellent defense at first base and led the circuit in fielding average at her position in 1944. As a batter, she displayed ability to get on base, ran the bases well, and consistently hit line drives. In addition, she served as starter and long reliever when not playing at first base.

== Personal life ==
In 1946, Ganote remained at home to marry Edward Weise. The couple had a daughter, Linda. She managed to fit in housework while working at Walgreens for 29 years.

Gertrude Ganote Weise is part of Women in Baseball, a permanent display based at the Baseball Hall of Fame and Museum in Cooperstown, New York, which was unveiled in 1988 to honor the entire All-American Girls Professional Baseball League. She died in her native Louisville, Kentucky on her 86th birthday.

== Career statistics ==
Batting

GP	AB	R	H	2B	3B	HR	RBI	SB	TB	BB	SO	BA	OBP	SLG
178	625	61	100	8	10	0	30	33	128	66	92	.160	.240	.205

Pitching

GP	W	L	W-L%	ERA	IP	H	RA	ER	BB	SO	HBP	WP	WHIP
22	6	8	.429	3.69	144	123	76	59	80	20	3	6	1.41

Fielding

GP	PO	A	E	TC	DP	FA
186	1536	27	31	1594	29	.981
