= List of All-American Girls Professional Baseball League players (M–R) =

The following is a list of All-American Girls Professional Baseball League players who formed part of the circuit during its twelve years of existence.

== See also ==
- List of All-American Girls Professional Baseball League players (A–C)
- List of All-American Girls Professional Baseball League players (D–G)
- List of All-American Girls Professional Baseball League players (H–L)
- List of All-American Girls Professional Baseball League players (S–Z)

== M ==
Name	Position(s)	Year(s)	Team(s)	Ref
Mary McCarty	outfield	1948	Peoria Redwings	
Gloria McCloskey	outfield	1953	Rockford Peaches	
Helen McCloskey	n/a	1944	n/a	
Joanne McComb	first base	1950	Springfield Sallies	
Judy McCormick	pitcher	1954	South Bend Blue Sox	
Ethel McCreary	outfield, first base	1943	Kenosha Comets, Rockford Peaches	
Betty Jean McFadden	pitcher	1943	South Bend Blue Sox	
Helene Machado	outfield	1946–1947	Peoria Redwings, Fort Wayne Daisies	
Betty McKenna	third base	1951–1953	Fort Wayne Daisies, Peoria Redwings, Battle Creek Belles, Muskegon Belles	
Therese McKinley	outfielder	1949	Muskegon Lassies	
Lucella MacLean	catcher, outfield	1943–1944	South Bend Blue Sox	
Dorothy Maguire *	catcher, outfield	1943–1949	Racine Belles, Milwaukee Chicks, Grand Rapids Chicks, Muskegon Lassies	
Elizabeth Mahon	outfield, second base	1944–1952	Kenosha Comets, Minneapolis Millerettes, South Bend Blue Sox	
Marie Mahoney	outfield	1947–1948	Fort Wayne Daisies, South Bend Blue Sox	
Kathleen Malach	pinch hitter	1947	Fort Wayne Daisies	
Lenora Mandella	pitcher	1949–1951	South Bend Blue Sox, Springfield Sallies, Peoria Redwings	
Marie Mansfield	pitcher, center field	1950–1954	Rockford Peaches, Battle Creek Belles	
Gloria Marks	pitcher	1943	Racine Belles	
Jean Marlowe	pitcher, infield/outfield utility	1948–1952, 1954	Springfield Sallies, Kenosha Comets, Kalamazoo Lassies	
Mirtha Marrero	pitcher	1948–1953	Chicago Colleens, Kalamazoo Lassies, Fort Wayne Daisies, Battle Creek Belles, Muskegon Belles	
Doris Marsh	pitcher	1945	Fort Wayne Daisies	
Theda Marshall	first base	1947	South Bend Blue Sox, Chicago Colleens	
Joan Martin	n/a	1946	South Bend Blue Sox	
Pauline Martin	n/a	1946	Muskegon Lassies	
Pat Mason	n/a	1950	n/a	
Ruth Mason	n/a	1953	Grand Rapids Chicks	
Ruth Matlack	pitcher, pinch-hitter	1950	Fort Wayne Daisies	
Jacqueline Mattson	catcher	1950–1951	Kenosha Comets, Springfield Sallies	
Joan Matuzewski	outfield	1951	South Bend Blue Sox	
Bernadine Maxwell	n/a	1953	n/a	
Mildred Meacham	first base	1947–1948	Fort Wayne Daisies, Racine Belles, Springfield Sallies	
Hazel Measner	pinch-hitter	1946	Rockford Peaches	
Naomi Meier	outfield	1946–1953	Rockford Peaches, Fort Wayne Daisies, Peoria Redwings, Chicago Colleens, Muskegon Lassies, Kalamazoo Lassies, Racine Belles, Battle Creek Belles, Muskegon Belles	
Berith Melin	outfield	1943	Rockford Peaches	
Marie Menheer	pitcher	1945	Racine Belles	
Joyce Messinger	n/a	1953	Grand Rapids Chicks	
Bernice Metesch	pitcher	1948	Rockford Peaches, South Bend Blue Sox	
Norma Metrolis	catcher	1946–1950	Muskegon Lassies, Racine Belles, Peoria Redwings, South Bend Blue Sox, Fort Wayne Daisies	
Alice Meyer	outfield	1948	South Bend Blue Sox	
Anna Meyer	shortstop, infield	1944	Kenosha Comets, Minneapolis Millerettes	
Rita Meyer	shortstop, pitcher	1946–1949	Peoria Redwings	
Darlene Mickelsen	outfield	1943, 1945	Kenosha Comets, South Bend Blue Sox	
Ruth Middleton	outfield	1950–1953	Chicago Colleens, Springfield Sallies, Battle Creek Belles, Muskegon Belles	
Pauline Miller	n/a	1948	Kenosha Comets	
Ruth Miller	catcher	1943	Rockford Peaches	
Betty Moczynski	outfield	1943	Rockford Peaches	
Jane Moffet	catcher, first base, outfield	1949–1952	Springfield Sallies, Kalamazoo Lassies, Battle Creek Belles	
Rose Montalbano	infield	1951–1953	South Bend Blue Sox	
Dorothy Montgomery	infield	1945–1947	Racine Belles, Muskegon Lassies, Grand Rapids Chicks	
Dorothy Moon	pitcher	1946	Rockford Peaches	
Dolores Moore	first base, second base	1953–1954	Grand Rapids Chicks	
Eleanor Moore	pitcher, first base	1950–1954	Chicago Colleens, Fort Wayne Daisies, Kalamazoo Lassies, Grand Rapids Chicks	
Mary Moore	pitcher	1948	Rockford Peaches	
Mary Moore	second base	1950–1952	Springfield Sallies, Battle Creek Belles	
Mary Moraty	pitcher	1946	Fort Wayne Daisies	
Carolyn Morris	pitcher	1944–1946	Rockford Peaches	
Esther Morrison	catcher, pitcher, outfield	1950	Chicago Colleens	
Glenora Moss	n/a	1943	Racine Belles	
Nancy Mudge	second base	1950–1954	Chicago Colleens, Springfield Sallies, Kalamazoo Lassies, Battle Creek Belles, Muskegon Belles	
Dolores Mueller	pitcher, third base	1949	South Bend Blue Sox	
Dorothy Mueller	pitcher, first base	1947–1948, 1950–1953	Peoria Redwings, South Bend Blue Sox, Grand Rapids Chicks	
Margaret Murray	catcher, outfield	1948–1949	Springfield Sallies	
Eve Mytrysak	n/a	1949	Muskegon Lassies	

* Maguire also played under her married name of Dorothy Chapman.

== N ==
Name	Position(s)	Year(s)	Team(s)	Ref
Elizabeth Nahtyk	n/a	1947	South Bend Blue Sox	
Dorothy Naum	catcher, infield, pitcher	1946–1953	South Bend Blue Sox, Kenosha Comets, Kalamazoo Lassies	
Doris Neal	third base, outfield	1948–1949	Springfield Sallies, Grand Rapids Chicks	
Merna Nearing	pitcher	1943	Kenosha Comets	
Doris Nelson	outfield	1944	Rockford Peaches	
Helen Nelson	catcher	1943	Rockford Peaches	
Mary Nelson	second base	1954	Fort Wayne Daisies	
Mary Nesbitt 1	pitcher, first base	1943–1945, 1947–1948, 1950	Racine Belles, Peoria Redwings	
Helen Nicol 2	pitcher	1943–1952	Kenosha Comets, Rockford Peaches	
Dolly Niemiec	second base, third base	1948–1952	Chicago Colleens, Springfield Sallies, Grand Rapids Chicks, Battle Creek Belles	
Miss Nogay	n/a	1951	Kalamazoo Lassies	
Helen Nordquist	outfield, pitcher	1951–1954	Kenosha Comets, Rockford Peaches, South Bend Blue Sox	
Cynthia Normine	n/a	1950	Rockford Peaches	
Donna Norris	right field	1953	Fort Wayne Daisies, South Bend Blue Sox	
Marjorie Nossek	n/a	1949	Racine Belles	

1 Nesbitt also played under her married name of Mary Wisham.
2 Nicol also played under her married name of Helen Fox.

== O ==
Name	Position(s)	Year(s)	Team(s)	Ref
Penny O'Brian	outfield	1945	Fort Wayne Daisies	
Eileen O'Brien	outfield	1948	Muskegon Lassies	
Patricia O'Connor	infield utility	1946	Kenosha Comets	
Anna Mae O'Dowd	catcher	1949–1951	Kenosha Comets, Chicago Colleens, Rockford Peaches, Racine Belles, Kalamazoo Lassies, Battle Creek Belles	
Joanne Ogden	second base	1953	South Bend Blue Sox	
Janice O'Hara	pitcher, infield/outfield utility	1943–1949	Kenosha Comets	
Marilyn Olinger	shortstop	1948–1953	Chicago Colleens, Grand Rapids Chicks	
Pauline Oravets	pitcher	1943	Rockford Peaches	
Dorothy Ortman	pitcher	1944	Racine Belles	
Joanne Overleese	second base	1946	Muskegon Lassies, Peoria Redwings	

== P ==
Name	Position(s)	Year(s)	Team(s)	Ref
Lavonne Paire	catcher, shortstop, third base	1944–1953	Minneapolis Millerettes, Fort Wayne Daisies, Racine Belles, Grand Rapids Chicks	
Toni Palermo	right field	1949–1950	Chicago Colleens, Springfield Sallies	
Shirley Palesh	right field	1949–1950	Racine Belles, Rockford Peaches, Grand Rapids Chicks	
Vickie Panos	outfielder	1944	South Bend Blue Sox, Milwaukee Chicks	
Barbara Parks	second base, shortstop	1950–1951	Chicago Colleens, Kenosha Comets	
Suzanne Parsons	infield, outfield, pitcher	1953–1954	Rockford Peaches	
Barbara Payne	infield, pitcher	1949–1951	Springfield Sallies, Rockford Peaches, Muskegon Lassies, Kalamazoo Lassies, Battle Creek Belles	
Marguerite Pearson	infield, outfield	1948–1954	Muskegon Lassies, Peoria Redwings, Racine Belles, Battle Creek Belles, Kalamazoo Lassies, South Bend Blue Sox, Grand Rapids Chicks	
Katherine Pechulis	infield/outfield utility	1946	Grand Rapids Chicks	
June Peppas	first base, pitcher, outfield	1948–1954	Fort Wayne Daisies, Racine Belles, Battle Creek Belles, Kalamazoo Lassies	
Migdalia Pérez *	pitcher	1948–1954	Chicago Colleens, Springfield Sallies, Battle Creek Belles, Rockford Peaches	
Joy Perkins	n/a	1950	South Bend Blue Sox	
Edythe Perlick	outfield	1943–1950	Racine Belles	
Marjorie Peters	pitcher	1943–1944	Rockford Peaches	
Betty Jean Peterson	catcher, infield utility	1952–1953	Rockford Peaches, Muskegon Belles, Kalamazoo Lassies	
Hattie Peterson	pitcher	1948–1949	Rockford Peaches	
Ernestine Petras	shortstop	1944–1952	Milwaukee Chicks, Grand Rapids Chicks, Chicago Colleens, Kenosha Comets, Battle Creek Belles	
Betty Petryna	third base	1948–1949	Grand Rapids Chicks, Fort Wayne Daisies	
Marjorie Pieper	outfield, infield, pitcher	1946–1953	Fort Wayne Daisies, Kenosha Comets, Chicago Colleens, Racine Belles, Peoria Redwings, Battle Creek Belles, Muskegon Belles	
Pauline Pirok	shortstop, third base, pitcher	1943–1948	Kenosha Comets, South Bend Blue Sox	
Grace Piskula	outfield utility	1944	Racine Belles	
Bertha Podolski	pitcher	1946	Fort Wayne Daisies	
Alice Pollitt	third base, shortstop	1947–1951	Rockford Peaches	
Mary Pratt	pitcher	1943–1947	Rockford Peaches, Kenosha Comets	
LaFerne Price	pitcher	1944	Milwaukee Chicks	
Charlene Pryer	second base, outfield	1946–1952	Muskegon Lassies, Kalamazoo Lassies, South Bend Blue Sox	

* Pérez also played under her married name of Migdalia Jinright.

== R ==
Name	Position(s)	Year(s)	Team(s)	Ref
Magdalen Redman	catcher, infield/outfield utility	1948–1954	Kenosha Comets, Grand Rapids Chicks	
Sara Reeser	first base	1946–1948, 1950	Muskegon Lassies, Kalamazoo Lassies	
Rita Rehrer	n/a	1946	Peoria Redwings	
Donna Reid	n/a	1954	Rockford Peaches	
Dorice Reid	outfield	1948–1951	Chicago Colleens, Grand Rapids Chicks	
Mary Reynolds	outfield, third base, pitcher	1946–1950	Peoria Redwings	
Ruth Richard	catcher, outfield	1947–1953	Grand Rapids Chicks, Rockford Peaches	
Marie Richardson	n/a	1953	Fort Wayne Daisies	
Joyce Ricketts	outfield	1953–1954	Grand Rapids Chicks	
Ruth Ries	pitcher	1952	Rockford Peaches	
Rosaline Rinaldi	n/a	1950	n/a	
Mary Rini	pitcher	1945–1946	Kenosha Comets, Muskegon Lassies	
Georgiana Rios	infield	1948	Fort Wayne Daisies, Peoria Redwings	
Earlene Risinger	pitcher	1948–1954	Springfield Sallies, Grand Rapids Chicks	
Marian Roach	n/a	1946	n/a	
Grace Rogato	n/a	1951	n/a	
Kay Rohrer	catcher, outfield	1945	Rockford Peaches	
Jenny Romatowski	catcher, third base, outfield	1946–1954	South Bend Blue Sox, Rockford Peaches, Chicago Colleens, Racine Belles, Peoria Redwings, Kalamazoo Lassies	
Martha Rommelaere	outfield	1950	Chicago Colleens, Springfield Sallies, Kenosha Comets	
Eilaine Roth	pitcher	1948–1954	Peoria Redwings, Kalamazoo Lassies	
Elaine Roth	pitcher	1948–1951	Peoria Redwings, South Bend Blue Sox, Kalamazoo Lassies	
Barbara Rotvig	pitcher	1948–1949, 1951	Kenosha Comets	
Mary Rountree	catcher	1946–1952	Peoria Redwings, Fort Wayne Daisies, Grand Rapids Chicks	
Patricia Roy	first base	1954	Fort Wayne Daisies	
Juanita Roylance	outfield	1946	Muskegon Lassies	
Irene Ruhnke *	outfield, second base, third base	1943–1947	Rockford Peaches, Minneapolis Millerettes, Fort Wayne Daisies	
Gloria Ruiz	outfield	1948–1949	Peoria Redwings	
Terry Rukavina	infield/outfield utility	1950–1951; 1953	Chicago Colleens, Springfield Sallies, Kalamazoo Lassies	
Janet Rumsey	pitcher	1951–1954	Battle Creek Belles, South Bend Blue Sox	
Betty Russell	outfield	1946	Racine Belles	
Margaret Russo	third base, shortstop	1950–1954	Peoria Redwings, Battle Creek Belles, Muskegon Belles, Rockford Peaches	

* Ruhnke also played under her married name of Irene Sanvitas.
