= 1948 All-American Girls Professional Baseball League season =

- League: All-American Girls Professional Baseball League
- Sport: Baseball
- Teams: Ten

Regular season
- Season champions: Grand Rapids Chicks (Eastern Division); Racine Belles (Western Division)

Shaugnessy playoffs
- Champions: Rockford Peaches

AAGPBL seasons
- ← 1947 1949 →

The 1948 All-American Girls Professional Baseball League season marked the sixth season of the circuit. The AAGPBL grew to an all-time peak of ten teams in that season, representing Eastern and Western zones, just in the first year the circuit shifted to strictly overhand pitching. Other modifications occurred during 1948. The ball was decreased in size from 11 1/2 inches (290 mm) to 10 3/8 inches (260 mm), while the base paths were lengthened to 72 feet and the pitching distance increased to 50 feet.

The Chicago Colleens and the Springfield Sallies were added to the previous roster that included the Kenosha Comets, Fort Wayne Daisies, Grand Rapids Chicks, Muskegon Lassies, Peoria Redwings, Racine Belles, Rockford Peaches and South Bend Blue Sox. The Chicago, Fort Wayne, Grand Rapids, Muskegon and South Bend teams were aligned in the East Division, while Kenosha, Peoria, Racine, Rockford and Springfield played in the Western Division. The number of games in the schedule increased from 112 to 126.

For the second consecutive year the AAGPBL spring training camp was held in Havana, Cuba. as part of a plan to create an International League of Girls Baseball. Around two hundred girls made the trip. Among them, players represented 27 different states in the United States and many provinces of Canada, while several Cuban players entered the league as a result of holding spring training there the year before. A total of 21 players had been in the league since its foundation in 1943.

The fact of two divisions resulted in the Shaughnessy system adding another round of playoffs to decide the championship between eight teams. The first round faced the top teams of each division in a best-of-three series, with the first place team playing against the third place team and the second place team against the fourth place team. The winners competed in a best-of-five divisional first round, with the first place team facing the third place team and the second place team against the fourth place team. The sectional champions then advanced to the third round and faced in the best-of-seven Championship Series.

Pitchers continued to dominate the league in that season even though many of them could not adapt to the new pitching style. Grand Rapids' Alice Haylett led all pitchers with a 0.77 earned run average, while 20 averaged at least a 1.99 mark. In addition, Haylett and Racine's Eleanor Dapkus hurled 10 shutouts a piece. The only .300 hitter was Kenosha's Audrey Wagner (.312), who also led the circuit in hits (130) and total bases (186). At the end of the season Wagner was honored with the AAGPBL Player of the Year Award.

The Grand Rapids and Racine teams won their respective division. In the first round, Grand Rapids, Fort Wayne, Racine and Rockford swept South Bend, Muskegon, Peoria and Kenosha, respectively. In the divisional playoffs, Fort Wayne swept Grand Rapids and Rockford did the same with Racine. Then, Rockford jumped out to a three-game lead in the final series and defeated Fort Wayne four games to one. Helen Nicol was credited with four of the 10 playoff wins of Rockford, including two in the finals, while Lois Florreich and Margaret Holgerson took three a piece. In Game 1 of the first round, Florreich pitched the first no-hitter in series history, and Holgerson threw a second no-hitter in Game 3 to set an all-time record for the most playoff no-hitters. Another highlight came in the first round, when South Bend's Jean Faut outdueled Haylett of Grand Rapids, 3–2, in 20 innings, in what would be the longest game in AAGPBL playoff history.

The league drew almost a million fans for the second consecutive season, although the Chicago and Springfield franchises failed to reach the attendance required. Then, the Colleens and the Sallies were turned into player development teams that toured and played exhibition games to recruit and train new players. The tour started in Chicago and ended up in Canada, including stops in Yankee Stadium and Griffith Stadium.

== Teams ==
1948 All-American Girls Professional Baseball League Teams
Division	Team	City	Stadium
East	Chicago Colleens	Chicago, Illinois	Shewbridge Field
East	Fort Wayne Daisies	Fort Wayne, Indiana	Memorial Park
East	Grand Rapids Chicks	Grand Rapids, Michigan	South High School Field
East	Muskegon Lassies	Muskegon, Michigan	Marsh Field
East	South Bend Blue Sox	South Bend, Indiana	Playland Park
West	Kenosha Comets	Kenosha, Wisconsin	Simmons Field
West	Peoria Redwings	Peoria, Illinois	Peoria Stadium
West	Racine Belles	Racine, Wisconsin	Horlick Field
West	Rockford Peaches	Rockford, Illinois	Beyer Stadium
West	Springfield Sallies	Springfield, Illinois	Jim Fitzpatrick Memorial Stadium

== Map of teams ==
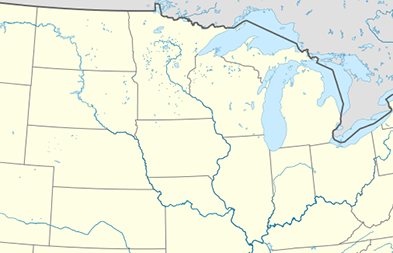
Eastern Division Western Division

== Standings ==
=== Eastern Division ===
Rank	Team	W	L	W-L%	GB
1	Grand Rapids Chicks	77	48	.616	–
2	Muskegon Lassies	67	58	.536	10
3	South Bend Blue Sox	57	69	.452	20 1/2
4	Fort Wayne Daisies	53	73	.421	24 1/2
5	Chicago Colleens	47	77	.379	29 1/2

=== Western Division ===
Rank	Team	W	L	W-L%	GB
1	Racine Belles	77	49	.616	–
2	Rockford Peaches	75	50	.600	1 1/2
3	Peoria Redwings	71	55	.563	6
4	Kenosha Comets	62	64	.421	15
5	Springfield Sallies	41	84	.328	35 1/2

== Postseason ==
First round Best of three series
1	Grand Rapids Chicks	3
3	South Bend Blue Sox	0
Eastern Division
2	Muskegon Lassies	0
4	Fort Wayne Daisies	3
1	Racine Belles	3
3	Peoria Redwings	0
Western Division
2	Rockford Peaches	3
4	Kenosha Comets	0

Second round Best of five series
1	Grand Rapids Chicks	0
4	Fort Wayne Daisies	3
1	Racine Belles	0
2	Rockford Peaches	3

Third round Best of seven series
ED	Fort Wayne Daisies	2
WD	Rockford Peaches	4

== Batting statistics ==
Statistic	Player	Record
Batting average	Audrey Wagner (KEN); Mary Nesbitt (PEO); Dorothy Kamenshek (ROC); Connie Wisniewski (GR); Betty Wagoner (MUS); Charlene Pryer (MUS); Evelyn Wawryshyn (SPR); Elizabeth Mahon (SB); Doris Sams (MUS); Alva Jo Fischer (MUS); Sophie Kurys (RAC); Dorothy Harrell (ROC); Merle Keagle (GR)	.312.292.289.289.278.262.262.258.257.252.252.251.251
Runs scored	Sophie Kurys (RAC); Faye Dancer (PEO); Dorothy Kamenshek (ROC); Merle Keagle (GR); Dorothy Ferguson (ROC); Josephine Lenard (MUS); Charlene Pryer (MUS); Audrey Wagner (KEN); Connie Wisniewski (GR); Mary Nesbitt (PEO)	97; 89; 89; 75; 73; 70; 70; 70; 70; 69
Hits	Audrey Wagner (KEN); Dorothy Kamenshek (ROC); Mary Nesbitt (PEO); Connie Wisniewski (GR); Vivian Kellogg (FW); Evelyn Wawryshyn (SPR); Dorothy Stolze (MUS); Sophie Kurys (RAC); Doris Satterfield (GR)	130; 128; 128; 127; 117; 114; 113; 112; 111
Doubles	Mary Nesbitt (PEO); Connie Wisniewski (GR); Audrey Wagner (KEN); Elizabeth Mahon (SB); Sophie Kurys (RAC); June Schofield (SPR); Rose Gacioch (ROC); Philomena Gianfrancisco (RAC); Merle Keagle (GR); Edythe Perlick (RAC)	24; 20; 16; 12; 12; 12; 11; 11; 11; 11
Triples	Eleanor Callow (CHI/ROC); Audrey Wagner (KEN); Mary Nesbitt (PEO); Vivian Kellogg (FW); June Schofield (SPR); Margaret Villa (KEN); Rita Briggs (ROC/CHI); Dorothy Harrell (ROC); Doris Sams (MUS); Doris Tetzlaff (CHI/FW)	15; 14; 12; 9; 9; 8; 7; 7; 7; 7
Home runs	Connie Wisniewski (GR); Eleanor Callow (CHI/ROC); Faye Dancer (PEO); Eleanor Dapkus (RAC); Philomena Gianfrancisco (RAC); Audrey Wagner (KEN); Christine Jewitt (KEN); Merle Keagle (GR); Sophie Kurys (RAC); Mary Nesbitt (PEO); Doris Sams (MUS)	7; 6; 6; 4; 4; 4; 3; 3; 3; 3; 3
Runs batted in	Rita Meyer (PEO); Connie Wisniewski (GR); Elizabeth Mahon (SB); Doris Satterfield (GR); Doris Sams (MUS); Dorothy Harrell (ROC); Mary Nesbitt (PEO); Josephine Lenard (MUS); Audrey Wagner (KEN); Eleanor Callow (CHI/ROC); Inez Voyce (GR)	68; 66; 65; 61; 59; 58; 58; 56; 56; 52; 52
Stolen bases	Sophie Kurys (RAC); Faye Dancer (PEO); Dorothy Kamenshek (ROC); Thelma Eisen (FW); Ernestine Petras (GR/CHI); Merle Keagle (GR); Edythe Perlick (RAC); Dorothy Ferguson (ROC); Dorothy Stolze (MUS); Evelyn Wawryshyn (SPR)	172; 102; 94; 88; 86; 85; 82; 73; 67; 66
Total bases	Audrey Wagner (KEN); Mary Nesbitt (PEO); Connie Wisniewski (GR); Dorothy Kamenshek (ROC); Vivian Kellogg (FW); Sophie Kurys (RAC); Doris Satterfield (GR); Elizabeth Mahon (SB); Doris Sams (MUS); Evelyn Wawryshyn (SPR)	186; 185; 172; 152; 144; 143; 136; 135; 134; 126

== Pitching statistics ==
Statistic	Player	Record
Wins	Alice Haylett (GR); Joanne Winter (RAC); Eleanor Dapkus (RAC); Lois Florreich (ROC); Dorothy Mueller (PEO); Ruby Stephens (SPR/KEN); Irene Kotowicz (CHI); Elaine Roth (PEO); Doris Sams (MUS); Audrey Haine (PEO); Helen Nicol (ROC); Jean Faut (SB)	25; 25; 24; 22; 21; 20; 18; 18; 18; 17; 17; 16
Winning percentage	Alice Haylett (GR); Rose Gacioch (ROC); Eleanor Dapkus (RAC); Nancy Warren (MUS/CHI); Dorothy Mueller (PEO); Marie Kruckel (SB/MUS); Lois Florreich (ROC); Joanne Winter (RAC); Ruby Stephens (SPR/KEN); Doris Sams (MUS)	.833.737.727.706.700.692.688.676.645.643
Earned run average	Alice Haylett (GR); Dorothy Mueller (PEO); Lois Florreich (ROC); Joanne Winter (RAC); Alma Ziegler (GR); Mildred Earp (GR); Jean Faut (SB); Nancy Warren (MUS/CHI); Alva Jo Fischer (MUS); Betsy Jochum (SB)	0.77; 1.11; 1.18; 1.18; 1.21; 1.31; 1.44; 1.45; 1.47; 1.51
Strikeouts	Joanne Winter (RAC); Lois Florreich (ROC); Irene Kotowicz (CHI); Margaret Holgerson (ROC); Eleanor Dapkus (RAC); Dorothy Mueller (PEO); Mildred Earp (GR); Jean Faut (SB); Amy Applegren (MUS); Bethany Goldsmith (KEN); Doris Sams (MUS); Alice Haylett (GR); Ruby Stephens (SPR/KEN); Betsy Jochum (SB); Dorothy Wiltse (FW)	248; 231; 197; 194; 191; 181; 166; 165; 129; 117; 117; 114; 114; 103; 101
Games pitched	Margaret Holgerson (ROC); Irene Kotowicz (CHI); Lois Florreich (ROC); Ruby Stephens (SPR/KEN); Mildred Earp (GR); Lillian Faralla (SB); Jean Faut (SB); Dorothy Wiltse (FW); Betty Tucker (CHI); Erma Bergmann (SPR); Alice Haylett (GR); Dorothy Mueller (PEO); Migdalia Pérez (CHI); Doris Sams (MUS); Bethany Goldsmith (KEN)	37; 37; 36; 36; 34; 34; 34; 34; 33; 32; 32; 32; 32; 32; 31
Innings pitched	Irene Kotowicz (CHI); Mildred Earp (GR); Lois Florreich (ROC); Margaret Holgerson (ROC); Alice Haylett (GR); Doris Sams (MUS); Lillian Faralla (SB); Dorothy Mueller (PEO); Dorothy Wiltse; Jean Faut (SB); Bethany Goldsmith (KEN); Ruby Stephens (SPR/KEN); Migdalia Pérez (CHI); Betty Tucker (CHI)	298; 282; 282; 277; 269; 268; 267; 267; 267; 250; 245; 241; 240; 238

== See also ==
- 1948 Major League Baseball season
