= Twila Shively =

- Left field / First base
- Born: March 20, 1920; Decatur, Illinois, U.S.
- Died: November 25, 1999 (aged 79); Douglas, Michigan, U.S.
- Batted: Right Threw: Right

Teams
- Grand Rapids Chicks (1945–1947); Chicago Colleens (1948); Peoria Redwings (1948–1950)

Career highlights and awards
- AAGPBL champion (1947)

Twila Shively (March 20, 1920 – November 25, 1999) was an American competitive baseball player. An outfielder, she played from 1945 through 1950 in the All-American Girls Professional Baseball League (AAGPBL). Listed at 5 ft 6 in (1.68 m), 128 lb., she batted and threw right-handed.

== Early life ==
Born in Decatur, Illinois, Twila Shively was the daughter of Glenn and Eva (née Bryant) Shively. She began playing softball at age eight and moved up in the softball ranks in Chicago as early as 1942. By then, she was featured in an article signed by Carl Guldager and published in the Chicago Daily News with this headline: “She’s Hedy Lamarr of Softball, Twila Shively Looks Like Model, Runs Bases Like Ty Cobb. Has Baseball Savvy Plus Pretty Face”.

== Career ==
Twila Shively spent five of her six years in the AAGPBL playing in the left field. A solid defensive player, she showed speed, good hands, an accurate throwing arm, and lived in a constant state of readiness. Routinely, she ranked among the top defensive outfielders in several categories, until a severe ankle injury limited her ability to perform, and had to switch to first base. Offensively, she made consistent contact, knew when to take the extra base, and excelled as a basestealer.

In 1944 Shively became a member of the Rockola Chicks team of the newly formed National Girls Baseball League. The NGBL was organized in Chicago to keep the best local players from migrating to the AAGPBL, which had been stabilized in 1943. After that, both circuits competed against each other to see who could associate itself with the biggest stars.

Shively entered the AAGPBL in 1945 with the Grand Rapids Chicks, playing for them three years before joining the Chicago Colleens (1948) and Peoria Redwings (1948–1950). In her rookie year she formed part of a Chicks outfield that included Thelma Eisen in the center field and Elizabeth Wicken at right field. Shively collected a .196 batting average and a .276 on-base percentage in 106 games, driving in 23 runs and scoring 42 times, while her 46 stolen bases ranked her fifth in the league. She also led all outfielders with a .968 fielding percentage and finished second for the most putouts (234) behind Fort Wayne Daisies' Penny O'Brian (236). During the regular season she achieved a career highlight, when she belted a two-out, walk-off grand slam to give her team the victory.

Her most productive season came in 1946, when she posted career numbers in average (.247), runs scored (78) hits (101), runs batted in (45), steals (45) and games played (111). Considering the year was great for many pitchers her numbers were quite respectable. Four no-hitters were recorded by Anna Mae Hutchison (Belles), Betty Luna (Blue Sox), Carolyn Morris (Peaches) and Amy Irene Applegren (Lassies), while Connie Wisniewski (Chicks) and Dorothy Wiltse (Daisies) topped the league in earned run average with 0.81 and 0.83, respectively. As a result, more than half of the circuit's players averaged under .200. Dorothy Kamenshek (Peaches) was the only hitter to reach the .300 mark (.316).

Following her baseball career, Shively graduated at Illinois State Normal and Indiana University and worked as a physical education teacher at Washington High School in South Bend, Indiana. She also coached the school's softball and volleyball teams to city championships, inspiring children for almost 30 years.

== Awards and recognitions ==
She is part of the AAGPBL permanent display at the Baseball Hall of Fame and Museum at Cooperstown, New York, unveiled in 1988, which is dedicated to the entire league rather than any individual personality.

== Death ==
Twila Shively died in Douglas, Michigan on Thanksgiving Day, 1999 at the age of 79, after suffering four years of Alzheimer's disease and a year-long fight with lung cancer.

== Career statistics ==
Batting

GP	AB	R	H	2B	3B	HR	RBI	SB	BB	TB	SO	BA	OBP	SLG
614	2141	274	429	42	20	4	166	255	523	291	322	.200	.296	.244

Fielding

GP	PO	A	E	TC	DP	FA
611	2028	102	67	2197	38	.970
