= Amy Applegren =

American baseball player (1926–2011)

Amy Irene Applegren
- Pitcher / Infielder
- Born: November 16, 1926; Peoria, Illinois, U.S.
- Died: April 3, 2011 (aged 84); Washington, Illinois, U.S.
- Batted: Right Threw: Left

debut
- 1944

Last appearance
- 1953

Teams
- Rockford Peaches (1944–1945, 1949–1952); Muskegon Lassies (1946–1949); South Bend Blue Sox (1953)

Career highlights and awards
- Three Championship teams (1945, 1949–1950); Seven playoff appearances (1945, 1947–1952); Pitched a no-hitter (1945)

Amy Irene "Lefty" Applegren (November 16, 1926 – April 3, 2011) was an American baseball pitcher and infielder who played from 1944 through 1953 in the All-American Girls Professional Baseball League (AAGPBL). Listed at 5'4, 125 lb., she batted and threw left-handed.

== Early life ==
Born in Peoria, Illinois, Amy Applegren was one of five siblings in the family of Roy and Amy [nee Gardiner] Applegren. She started playing softball at the age of eleven for the Farrow Chicks, a team based in her hometown. In the early 1940s she joined the Caterpillar Dieselettes, where she came to the attention of a scout of the All-American Girls Professional Baseball League. The league had been founded the year before by Philip K. Wrigley, a chewing-gum magnate and owner of the Chicago Cubs Major League Baseball club. Wrigley feared that major leaguers would be drafted into the military during World War II, while minor leaguers were already being called up. Teams of girls (never called women) seemed like a way to fill ballparks, according to an article in Smithsonian in 1989. Applegren showed up at Peru, Illinois, for a tryout and was offered a contract to play. The league lasted for 12 seasons from 1943 to 1954, and she played in all but the first and last seasons.

== AAGPBL career ==
Applegren joined the AAGPBL in 1944 with the Rockford Peaches, playing for them two years. A hard-thrower underhand lefty, Applegren posted a 16–15 record for Rockford in her season debut and went 13-11 the next year, as part of a pitching rotation that included Carolyn Morris and Jean Cione. In the interim, she graduated from Peoria Manual High School.

The Peaches, with Bill Allington at the helm, clinched the league title in 1945 with a 67–43 record and later defeated the Fort Wayne Daisies in the best-of-seven series, four to one games, behind a strong pitching effort from Morris (3–0) and the opportune hitting of Dorothy Kamenshek (6-for-21, .285).

Applegren opened 1946 with the expansion Muskegon Lassies, managed by Buzz Boyle, as the league usually switched players as needed to help new teams to be competitive. Nevertheless, the Lassies went 46-66 their first year, good enough for a modest sixth place in the now eight-team league. Applegren struggled to an 8–18 record, even though she hurled a no-hitter against the Grand Rapids Chicks on July 31.

The first AAGPBL spring training outside the United States was held in 1947 in Havana, Cuba, as part of a plan to create an International League of Girls Baseball. That season the league made the transition from underhand to full side-arm pitching.

Muskegon, now managed by legendary Bill Wambsganss, saw a vast improvement in 1947. Besides Applegren, the revamped Lassies included top notch players such as Jo Lenard (OF), Dorothy Maguire (C), Charlene Pryer (IF), Doris Sams (OF/P), Dorothy Stolze (IF), Nancy Warren (P) and Evelyn Wawryshyn (IF), among others. Muskegon (69–43) won a close pennant race with the Grand Rapids Chicks (65–47), having three of the top four leaders in earned run average with Sams (0.98), Applegren (1.06) and Warren (1.13), but failed in the first round of the playoffs dropping 3 of 4 games to the Racine Belles.

In 1948 Applegren moved to first base as the league shifted strictly to overhand pitching. She then turned into a competent defensive player and a solid hitter. She spent part of two seasons with Muskegon, and was dealt back to Rockford during the 1949 midseason.

Applegren played for the Peaches through 1952, being part of the champion teams in 1949 and 1950, and joined the South Bend Blue Sox in 1953 for her last AAGPBL season.

With their fourth Championship Title the Rockford team set an all-time record in the league. Applegren was a member of three Peaches champion teams (including her 1945 season), being glorified for the same feat by Eleanor Callow, Lois Florreich and Ruth Richard (all of them did it from 1948 through 1950). Nevertheless, the four girls were surpassed by the eternal Rose Gacioch, who did it in 1945 and from 1948 to 1950, to set an all-time record for the most championship titles for a player while playing in the same team.

== Life after baseball ==
Following her baseball days, Applegren returned to Peoria and worked for Caterpillar Tractor Company as a data entry clerk for insurance benefits. She retired in 1985, after 19 years of work. Applegren, who never married, lived with her mother and took care of her. After retiring from Caterpillar she enjoyed playing golf and bowling.

In the early 1980s, a group of former members of the league led by June Peppas created the AAGPBL Players Association and lobbied to have the circuit recognized in the National Baseball Hall of Fame and Museum at Cooperstown, New York. Yet it was not really a well known fact until 1992, when filmmaker Penny Marshall premiered her film A League of Their Own, which was a fictionalized account of activities during the league's first season. This film brought a rejuvenated interest to the extinct league, while many of the real players began to earn a rebirth of celebrity over the years for coming. In 1993, she received word she had been selected for membership in the Greater Peoria Sports Hall of Fame.

Amy Applegren died in Washington, Illinois, on April 3, 2011, at the age of 84.

== Career statistics ==
Pitching

GP	W	L	W-L%	ERA	IP	H	RA	ER	BB	SO	WHIP
206	86	98	.467	2.52	1451	905	586	407	880	501	1.23

Batting

GP	AB	R	H	2B	3B	HR	RBI	SB	BB	SO	BA
234	1007	102	237	15	3	1	73	61	72	66	.235

Fielding

PO	A	E	TC	DP	FA
2435	535	90	3060	86	.971
