= Bethany Goldsmith =

American baseball player

- Pitcher
- Born: October 6, 1927; Elgin, Illinois, U.S.
- Died: October 24, 2004 (aged 77); Orlando, Florida, U.S.
- Batted: Right Threw: Right

Teams
- Kenosha Comets (1948–1950)

Career highlights and awards
- Postseason appearance (1949); Women in Baseball – AAGPBL Permanent Display at Baseball Hall of Fame and Museum (1988)

Bethany Joan "Beth" Goldsmith (October 6, 1927 – October 24, 2004) was a pitcher who played from 1948 through 1950 in the All-American Girls Professional Baseball League (AAGPBL). Listed at 5 ft 10 in (1.78 m), 160 lb, she batted and threw right-handed.

Born in Elgin, Illinois, Goldsmith started playing sandlot ball with the boys of her neighborhood at age 12 and organized softball for the McGraw Electric team when she was a teenager. Charlene Barnett, a former teammate on the McGraw team who had joined the AAGPBL the previous year, advised Goldsmith to attend the next spring training of the league in Opa-locka, Florida. Primarily an outfielder, she attended the tryout and was converted into a pitcher on the strength of her arm and her quick overhand delivery. She then was assigned to the Kenosha Comets to start the 1948 season.

In her rookie year Goldsmith posted a 14–14 record and a 1.68 earned run average in 31 pitching appearances, striking out 117 batters in 245 innings of work. During the season, she hurled both games of a doubleheader against the Fort Wayne Daisies. She limited them to one hit in the opener but lost the game. Then she had better luck in the second game and was credited with the victory. In addition, she finished 11th in innings pitched and tied for 10th for the most strikeouts with Muskegon Lassies' Doris Sams.

Before the 1949 season, Goldsmith enjoyed a memorable experience during an AAGPBL tour of Central America, as the teams were feted by both government officials and the common people. In Nicaragua, she visited the presidential palace and was greeted by the then President Anastasio Somoza. That year, she went 8–11 with a 3.09 ERA in 29 games. Fourth place Kenosha advanced to the postseason, but lost to Muskegon in the best-of-three first round. In her only career playoff game, Goldsmith pitched two perfect innings of relief while striking out three. Goldsmith improved to 12–9 with a .368 ERA in 1950, her last season in the league. In all, she finished with 34–34 record and a 2.72 ERA in 87 games.

Following her baseball career, she worked for AT&T company for 30 years. After retiring in 1984, she attended AAGPBL Players Association reunions and enjoyed playing golf in her home of Orlando, Florida.

Goldsmith forms part of Women in Baseball, a permanent display based at the Baseball Hall of Fame and Museum in Cooperstown, New York, which was unveiled in 1988 to honor the entire All-American Girls Professional Baseball League.

== Career statistics ==
Pitching

GP	W	L	W-L%	ERA	IP	H	RA	ER	BB	SO	HBP	WP	WHIP
87	34	34	.500	2.72	622	410	251	188	332	246	44	17	1.19

Batting

GP	AB	R	H	2B	3B	HR	RBI	SB	TB	BB	SO	BA	OBP	SLG	OPS
87	212	24	34	2	0	0	15	4	36	18	29	.160	.226	.170	.396

Fielding

GP	PO	A	E	TC	DP	FA
87	31	132	12	175	2	.932
