= Margaret Wenzell =

American (1925–2014)

- Utility player
- Born: May 21, 1925; Detroit, Michigan, U.S.
- Died: July 6, 2014 (aged 89)
- Batted: Right Threw: Right
- Stats at Baseball Reference

Teams
- Grand Rapids Chicks (1945); Muskegon Lassies (1946); Peoria Redwings (1947); Fort Wayne Daisies (1947); Springfield Sallies (1948); Racine Belles (1949); Fort Wayne Daisies (1949); Kalamazoo Lassies (1950); Racine Belles (1950); Kalamazoo Lassies (1951); Battle Creek Belles (1951–1952); South Bend Blue Sox (1952–1953)

Career highlights and awards
- AAGPBL champion (1952)

Margaret “Marge” Wenzell (May 21, 1925 – July 6, 2014) was a utility infielder/outfielder who played from 1945 through 1953 in the All-American Girls Professional Baseball League (AAGPBL). Listed at 5 ft 2 in (1.57 m), 134 lb., she batted and threw right-handed.

A member of a champion team, Wenzell was a light-hitting, fielder who played for nine teams during her nine years in the league. She played all positions except pitcher and catcher and showed an ability to gauge the mood of the team and lighten things up when needed.

Born in Detroit, Michigan, Wenzell grew up learning the game of baseball from her father, a semi-professional ballplayer, and her two brothers, who also played the game. She later joined an industrial softball league in Michigan at the age of 14. Many players from her league entered the AAGPBL in its inaugural season of 1943. She waited a couple of years to attend a tryout. After being accepted, she was assigned to the Grand Rapids Chicks.

In her rookie season, Wenzell hit a .119 average in 19 games, serving as a backup outfielder for Thelma Eisen, Twila Shively and Elizabeth Wicken. She opened 1946 with the Muskegon Lassies, and suffered a dislocated shoulder to end her season after only eight games. In 1947 she batted a combined .097 in 31 games with the Peoria Redwings and the Fort Wayne Daisies.

Wenzell played right field for the expansion Springfield Sallies in 1948. In 104 games she posted a (BA/OBP/SLG) of .168/.282/.208 with a career-best 33 stolen bases. During the season, she hit the only home run of her career while visiting the South Bend Blue Sox. It was a special homer, when she dropped a line drive between two outfielders and stretched a single with her hustle into an inside-the-park home run. I was circling the bases and they waved me home plate, Wenzell said in an interview. I slid into home on my belly. It was the winning run for the Sallies and her parents were in attendance.

From 1949 to 1952, Wenzell played for several teams as the league shifted players to help teams stay competitive. She was traded to the Racine Belles (1949), played again with Fort Wayne (1949), then with the Kalamazoo Lassies (1950), and returned to Racine (1950) and Kalamazoo (1951) before joining the Battle Creek Belles (1951–1952).

Her most productive season came in 1951, when she batted .213, stole 25 bases, and posted career-numbers in games played (108), runs scored (43), hits (81), runs batted in (41), extra bases (105) and total bases (105), while ending fifth in the league for the most triples (7). Wenzell was sent to South Bend late in the 1952 season, in time to help the Blue Sox during the playoffs. She hit a career-high .216 in 84 games for Battle Creek and South Bend, including 28 runs, 20 RBI and 41 steals, completing her seventh deal in four years.

Toward the end of the 1952 season, South Bend manager Karl Winsch disciplined one of the girls by suspending her for not going in to pinch-run quickly when asked. Five other players walked out in protest, leaving Winsch's team short-handed for the rest of the year, going into the playoffs with only 12 players on the roster. Wenzell played in outfield or infield in all eight postseason games. South Bend beat Fort Wayne in the best-of-three first round. The final series took all five games to decide the champion. The Rockford Peaches held a 2–0 advantage, and the Blue Sox won the last three games to clinch the title. She returned to South Bend in 1953, her last season in the league.

Following her baseball days, Wenzell labored at General Motors for two years. She then moved to California and worked for an electric company, retiring in 1985.

Since 1988 she is part of Women in Baseball, a permanent display based at the Baseball Hall of Fame and Museum in Cooperstown, New York, which was unveiled to honor the entire AAGPBL rather than individual baseball personalities.

Wenzell died in 2014. She was buried in Cathedral City, California next to her spouse and fellow Hall of Fame member, Dorothy Kamenshek.

== Career statistics ==
Batting

GP	AB	R	H	2B	3B	HR	RBI	SB	TB	BB	SO	BA	OBP	SLG
557	1677	179	316	30	21	1	128	147	391	256	170	.188	.296	.233

Fielding

GP	PO	A	E	TC	DP	FA
GP	805	584	148	1537	68	.904
