= Mildred Meacham =

American baseball player

- First base
- Born: May 5, 1924; Charlotte, North Carolina, U.S.
- Died: January 7, 2017 (aged 92); Charlotte, North Carolina, U.S.
- Batted: Right Threw: Right

Teams
- Fort Wayne Daisies (1947); Racine Belles (1947); Springfield Sallies (1948)

Mildred Meacham (May 5, 1924 – January 7, 2017) was an infielder who played in the All-American Girls Professional Baseball League (AAGPBL). Listed at 5' 8", 160 lb., Meacham batted and threw right handed. She was nicknamed ″Meach″.

Mildred Meacham was a fast base runner and showed good defensive skills at first base during her two seasons in the league.

Born in Charlotte, North Carolina, Meacham grew up playing basketball and softball while at high school. She played in the National Girls Baseball League of Chicago before joining the AAGPBL in 1947 with the Fort Wayne Daisies. During the midseason she was traded to the Racine Belles, as the league shifted players as needed to help some teams stay afloat.

In 1948 Meacham became a regular with the Springfield Sallies, as part of a solid indield that included Evelyn Wawryshyn at second base, Doris Neal at third, and June Schofield at shortstop. She posted a career .179 average with 24 stolen bases in 97 games, while driving in 10 runs and scoring 26 times.

In 1988, Meacham received further recognition when she became part of Women in Baseball, a permanent display based at the Baseball Hall of Fame and Museum in Cooperstown, New York, which was unveiled to honor the entire All-American Girls Professional Baseball League.

Meacham, who lived in Charlotte, North Carolina, was one of the oldest living former AAGPBL players. She died January 7, 2017.

== Career statistics ==
Batting

GP	AB	R	H	2B	3B	HR	RBI	SB	TB	BB	SO	BA	OBP	SLG
97	291	26	52	4	3	0	10	24	62	32	37	.179	.260	.213

Fielding

GP	PO	A	E	TC	DP	FA
95	984	32	26	1042	20	.975
