= Sara Reeser =

- First base
- Born: February 11, 1925 (age 101); Columbus, Ohio, U.S.
- Bats: Left Throws: Left

Teams
- Muskegon Lassies (1946–1948); Kalamazoo Lassies (1950)

Sara Louise Reeser (born February 11, 1925) is a former infielder who played in the All-American Girls Professional Baseball League between the 1946 and 1950 seasons. Listed at 5 ft 4 in (1.63 m), 130 lb, she batted and threw left-handed.

Noted for her defensive skills at first base, Sara Reeser recorded the best fielding average at her position in 1947. Her .990 average also is the second best in league history for a single season, being only surpassed by the legendary Dorothy Kamenshek (.995) in 1949. A .218 career hitter, Reeser excelled at slap bunting for base hits. In addition, she possessed a near perfect eye for the strike zone and seldom struck out, as evidenced by her .305 career on-base percentage and her 1.54 walk-to-strikeout ratio (149-to-97).

Born in Columbus, Ohio, Reeser was a latecomer and did not start playing until age 16 in a Columbus industrial softball league. Reeser was 21 years old and married when she entered the league in 1946 with the Muskegon Lassies.

In her rookie season, Reeser collected a .207 batting average and stole a career 45 bases in 110 games, while fielding for a solid .977 average, finishing in fourth place behind Grand Rapids Chicks' Betty Whiting (.989), Rockford Peaches' Kamenshek (.985), and Racine Belles' Margaret Danhauser (.982).

Her most productive season came in 1947, when she posted career numbers in batting average (.231) and hits (92), while committing only 27 errors in fielding chances to lead all first-sackers with her aforementioned .990 mark. She also set an all-time single season record for the most sacrifice bunts (39) and stole a second career best 36 bases. Late in the season, her teammate Doris Sams hurled a 2–0 perfect game against Dorothy Wiltse and the Fort Wayne Daisies. A RBI-single by Alva Jo Fischer in the fifth inning and a RBI-double by Reeser in the eight represented the only runs of the game, in what otherwise was a strong pitching duel.

Reeser batted .223 in 1948, while matching her career 110 games played, and finished second in fielding average (.986), slightly exceeded by Grand Rapids' Inez Voyce (.989). Out in 1949, she returned with her team when it became the Kalamazoo Lassies in 1950, playing briefly for them in just ten games.

Sara Reeser, along with her former teammates and opponents, received their long overdue recognition when the Baseball Hall of Fame and Museum dedicated a permanent display to the All American Girls Professional Baseball League in 1988.

== Career statistics ==
Batting

GP	AB	R	H	2B	3B	HR	RBI	SB	TB	BB	SO	BA	OBP	SLG
342	1177	134	256	14	6	1	88	112	285	179	97	.218	.305	.242

Fielding

GP	PO	A	E	TC	DP	FA
340	3455	100	58	3613	58	.984
