= Doris Sams =

American baseball player (1927–2012)

- Center field / Left field / Pitcher
- Born: February 2, 1927; Knoxville, Tennessee, U.S.
- Died: June 28, 2012 (aged 85); Knoxville, Tennessee, U.S.
- Batted: Right Threw: Right

Career statistics
- Batting average: .290
- Home runs: 22
- Runs batted in: 286
- Win–loss record: 64–47
- Earned run average: 2.16

Teams
- Muskegon Lassies (1946–1950); Kalamazoo Lassies (1950–1953)

Career highlights and awards
- 2× Player of the Year Award (1947, 1949); 5× AAGPBL All-Star (1947, 1949–1952); Pitched a perfect game on August 18, 1947; Pitched a no-hitter on July 12, 1948; AAGPBL batting average leader (1949); AAGPBL home run leader (1952)

Doris Jane Sams (February 2, 1927 – June 28, 2012), nicknamed "Sammye", was an American outfielder and pitcher who played from 1946 through 1953 in the All-American Girls Professional Baseball League (AAGPBL). Listed at 5 ft 9 in (1.75 m), 145 lbs., she batted and threw right-handed. Utilized as both pitcher and fielder, Sams was named the best player of the AAGPBL twice (1947, 1949). She was the third of five pitchers to throw a perfect game in league history.

== Early life ==
A native of Knoxville, Tennessee, Doris was the only daughter of Robert and Pauline Sams. She grew up in a home where baseball was considered of vital importance. Her grandfather was a semi-professional hurler who taught her how to pitch, while her father was a semi-professional center fielder who taught her how to catch and field. Athletically inclined, she started playing sports at an early age with the assistance of her brothers Paul and Robert Jr. She started playing softball with older girls in 1938 when she was 11, helping her softball team win the state championship in seven of the next eight years, and representing Tennessee in a national tournament in 1941. She later played for the Nelson's Cafe club, until the Pepsi Cola Company bought it. She stayed with the Pepsi Cola team until 1946, winning three championships with them before starting her career in the All-American Girls Professional Baseball League.

== AAGPBL career ==
At age 19, Sams entered the AAGPBL in 1946 with the expansion Muskegon Lassies. She had an auspicious debut, hitting a .276 batting average with 15 runs scored and nine runs driven home in 42 games. As an underhand pitcher, she posted an 8–9 record with a 3.78 earned run average in 25 pitching appearances, while her average was seventh best in the league for players with 100 or more at-bat (she went 29-for-106). Muskegon, with Buzz Boyle at the helm, placed sixth in the eight-team league with a 46–66 record.

The first AAGPBL spring training outside the United States was held in 1947 in Havana, Cuba, as part of a plan to create an International League of Girls Baseball. Sams was one of two hundred players to attend the new training camp, in a Lassies team now managed by legendary Bill Wambsganss. The team included talented players such as shortstop Dorothy Stolze and pitchers Amy Applegren and Nancy Warren, among others. That season the league made the transition from underhand to full side-arm pitching. Sams exploded in her sophomore season, to become one of the leading all-around players in the circuit. She finished with a .280 average, the third-highest among regulars, and collected nine doubles, five triples, 41 RBI and 31 runs in 107 games. She also pitched 19 games, going 11–4 with a low 0.93 ERA and a significant .733 winning percentage, allowing 26 runs (15 earned) while striking out 34 and walking 28. She was second only to Mildred Earp of the Grand Rapids Chicks, who posted a 20–8 record (.714) and a 0.68 ERA in 35 games. In addition, Sams ended 7th in total bases (116), tied for 9th in hits (97), and tied for 7th in RBI. But her great highlight came on August 18 of the 1947 season, when she collected her eleventh victory by pitching a perfect game, defeating the strong Fort Wayne Daisies, 2–0. Sams earned the Player of the Year Award and made her first All-Star Team as an outfielder and pitcher that year, becoming the only player in AAGPBL history to be so honored. Muskegon went on to win the regular season title with a 69–43 record, but fell to the Racine Belles in the first round of the playoffs.

In 1948 the AAGPBL expanded to a historical peak of ten teams divided into Eastern and Western Divisions, and made the switch from side-arm to overhand pitching. On July 12, Sams opened the year by hurling a 3–0 no-hitter against the Springfield Sallies, one of the league's two new clubs, along with the Chicago Colleens. One evening later, she helped beat the Sallies 6–5, going 3-for-4, including a two-run homer, a single and an RBI triple. Then, the next day she pitched a one-hitter, 3–1 victory against South Bend, and contributed with two hits and one RBI. But Sams never really made the adjustment to the new style pitching, finishing with an 18–10 mark and a 1.54 ERA. Nevertheless, she enjoyed a productive season as a hitter, collecting a .257 average (9th in the league) after going 105-for-409. She also scored 105 runs, slugged six doubles, seven triples and three home runs, recording career-best numbers with 59 RBI and 117 games played. Thanks in part to her timely hitting, Muskegon finished second in the Eastern Division with a record of 66–57 and advanced to the playoffs, only to be beaten by the Fort Wayne Daisies in the first round. Unfortunately, Sams was overlooked for the All-Star Team, being surpassed by Kenosha Comets center fielder and Player of the Year Audrey Wagner, who won the batting title with a .312 average, and belted four homers with 70 runs and 56 RBI. Wagner was the only girl to hit over .300 in that season, ending 23 points ahead of runner-up Connie Wisniewski.

As hurlers adapted to the new pitching style, batting averages declined even more during the 1949 season. Sams won the batting crown with a .279 mark, as she repeated as Player of the Year to become the first player in the league to twice win player of the year honors. She won the batting title race by a single point over Wisniewski and led the circuit with 114 hits (one more hit than Wisniewski), but was not among the leaders in any other offensive category. As a pitcher, Sams had a 15–10 mark with a 1.58 ERA and finished 8th in ERA, tied for 7th in wins and tied for 8th in shutouts. On July 14 of that season, she hurled a one-hitter, 3–1 victory against South Bend and helped herself with two hits and one RBI. Then, on August 19 she defeated South Bend again on a three-hit shutout, 2–0, while hitting a single with a run scored. All pitchers were led by Jean Faut of the South Bend Blue Sox, who went 24–8 with 120 strikeouts and a 1.58 ERA, and Lois Florreich of the Rockford Peaches, who posted a 22–7 record with 210 strikeouts (a league high) and a minuscule 0.67 ERA, to set an all-time season record for lowest ERA in the league's history. Sams made the All-Star Team for a second time while Muskegon, managed by Carson Bigbee, had a fifth-best record of 46–66 and advanced to the playoffs. The Belles took the first round from Kenosha but were swept in the semi-finals by South Bend.

The AAGPBL used a livelier ball in 1950. As a result, offensive levels augmented significantly in all cases with more hits, scoring more runs and hitting four times as many home runs as they did in previous seasons. That year, Sams began a string of four consecutive seasons with a batting average over .300. She finished 5th in the batting race with a .301 average, was 3rd in slugging (.419), and tied for 5th in home runs (4). It was the last season she pitched on a regular basis, going 12–13 with a 2.60 ERA, as she made her third All-Star Team. During the midseason, poor attendance in Muskegon forced the movement of the struggling Lassies to Kalamazoo, Michigan. The change of scenery did not help, as the now Kalamazoo Lassies finished in the cellar with the worst record of the league (36-73-2). Bonnie Baker, catcher for South Bend early in the season, joined the Kalamazoo team as player-manager in a short stint for her, because the following year the league passed a rule banning female managers.

In 1951, Sams allowed 13 hits and 11 runs in her final three innings of work on the mound, though her offensive production remained consistent. She ranked 6th in average (.306) and 9th in total bases (135), tying for 4th in doubles (16) and for 8th in hits (109). She added two homers, 40 runs and 33 RBI in 97 games, and also earned a fourth selection to the All-Star Team. The Lassies posted a measly record of 34–75 and finished in 7th place (out of 8th in the league).

Sams enjoyed a career-season in 1952, when she led the circuit with 12 home runs and finished third in average (.314) in 109 games. She also was second in hits (128), doubles (25) and total bases (195), and ended third in RBI (57) in her last year as an All-Star Team member, while Kalamazoo finished 5th of six teams with a 49–60 record. During a double-header sweep of Grand Rapids in June, she homered in both games, including a two-run blast in a four-hit, 3–0 shutout by Ruth Williams in game one, and a solo homer in a seven-hit, 2–1 victory of Gloria Cordes in the nightcap. With her 12 dingers, Sams broke the league's all-time home run record of 10 set in 1943 by Racine's Eleanor Dapkus. That mark would be eclipsed in 1954 by Fort Wayne's Joanne Weaver, when she hit 29 home runs during what turned out to be the league's final season.

In 1953 Sams played her last season in the AAGPBL. She appeared in 46 games and hit .312 (54-for-173), including 23 runs, seven extrabases and 22 RBI.

In an eight-year career, Sams was a .290 hitter in 271 games and posted a 64–47 record with a 2.16 ERA as a pitcher.

== Batting statistics ==
GP	AB	R	H	2B	3B	HR	RBI	TB	BA	SLG
271	2485	290	720	82	23	22	286	914	.290	.368

== Life after baseball ==
Following her baseball career, Sams returned home and accepted a good job offer as computer operator for the Knoxville Utility Board, where she worked for 25 years, retiring in 1979.

Sams, who never married, was inducted into the Tennessee Sports Hall of Fame in 1970 and the Knoxville Hall of Fame in 1982. She also is part of the AAGPBL permanent display at the Baseball Hall of Fame and Museum at Cooperstown, New York, opened in 1988, which is dedicated to the entire league rather than any individual player. Sams died on June 28, 2012, aged 85.

== AAGPBL perfect games ==
Pitcher(s)	Season	Team	Opponent
Annabelle Lee	1944	Minneapolis Millerettes	Kenosha Comets
Carolyn Morris	1945	Rockford Peaches	Fort Wayne Daisies
Doris Sams	1947	Muskegon Lassies	Fort Wayne Daisies
Jean Faut	1951	South Bend Blue Sox	Rockford Peaches
Jean Faut	1953	South Bend Blue Sox	Kalamazoo Lassies
