= Beatrice Allard =

- Pitcher
- Born: July 10, 1930; Muskegon, Michigan, U.S.
- Died: September 5, 2020 (aged 90)
- Batted: Right Threw: Right

Teams
- Muskegon Lassies (1949)

Career highlights and awards
- Women in Baseball – AAGPBL Permanent Display at Baseball Hall of Fame and Museum (1988)

Beatrice Jean Allard ("Bea") (July 10, 1930 – September 5, 2020) was a pitcher who played in the All-American Girls Professional Baseball League (AAGPBL) during the 1949 season. Listed at 5 ft 4 in (1.63 m), 130 lb, she batted and threw right-handed.

Beatrice Allard was a fireballing right-hander, with a deceptive sidearm delivery, whose promising career was cut short by an injured shoulder after being forced to change her delivery.

Born in Muskegon, Michigan, Allard learned to play sandlot ball with other neighborhood children when she was a youngster. She became a fan of the Muskegon Lassies and did not miss a home game during their first three seasons in All American Girls Professional Baseball League. One day she decided to assist a tryout to help a friend catcher by tossing a few balls sidearm, gradually increasing the distance each time, even though she had no intention of playing in the league. The league's president Max Carey spotted her as a potential pitcher, so he signed her to a contract.

Allard joined the league in 1949 with her beloved Lassies. In the season opener in Muskegon, against the Kenosha Comets, she was called by team's manager Carson Bigbee to relieve in the top of the ninth inning with the bases loaded and nobody out. "The manager tossed me a ball and said 'Okay kid, see what you can do'", Allard explained in an interview. She struck out the first two batters and the third popped out to preserve the win and earn her a save. She was used again the next night, this time as a starter. "I pitched five good innings and was able to hit a triple first time up and a single later", she remembered.

As the year progressed, Allard was going along fine until a sore arm midway through the season quickly dimmed her performance. They tried to change my delivery and I got all messed up, she said. I didn't complain, I didn't want to be a baby, she added. Allard finished the season with her arm in a sling and decided to go to a doctor, who told her that she had a dead arm and her playing days were over.

After her baseball career ended, Allard joined the U.S. Army as a cryptographer and was stationed in San Francisco for three years. Afterwards, she returned to Michigan and worked in the Grand Rapids Employment Office for 31 years.

In 1988, Allard became part of Women in Baseball, a permanent display based at the Baseball Hall of Fame and Museum in Cooperstown, New York, which was unveiled to honor the entire All-American Girls Professional Baseball League rather than any individual personality.

Beatrice Allard was a long-time resident of Lillian, Alabama. She died on September 5, 2020.

== Career statistics ==
Pitching

| GP | W | L | W-L% | ERA | IP | H | RA | ER | BB | SO | WHIP |
|---|---|---|---|---|---|---|---|---|---|---|---|
| 19 | 2 | 2 | .500 | 2.75 | 59 | 48 | 26 | 18 | 49 | 15 | 1.64 |

Batting

| GP | AB | R | H | 2B | 3B | HR | RBI | SB | TB | BB | SO | BA | OBP | SLG |
|---|---|---|---|---|---|---|---|---|---|---|---|---|---|---|
| 19 | 20 | 1 | 4 | 1 | 1 | 0 | 1 | 0 | 7 | 3 | 8 | .200 | .304 | .350 |

Fielding

| GP | PO | A | E | TC | FA |
|---|---|---|---|---|---|
| 19 | 4 | 14 | 2 | 20 | .900 |
