= Doris Neal =

American baseball player (1928–2012)

- Third base / Outfield
- Born: August 30, 1928; Lincoln Park, Michigan, U.S.
- Died: July 7, 2012 (aged 83); Sarasota, Florida, U.S.
- Batted: Right Threw: Right

Teams
- Springfield Sallies (1948); Grand Rapids Chicks (1949)

Doris M. Neal (August 30, 1928 – July 7, 2012) was an infielder and outfielder who played in the All-American Girls Professional Baseball League (AAGPBL). Listed at 5' 4", 128 lb., she batted and threw right handed.

Doris Neal was a light-hitting batter during her two seasons in the league.

Born and raised in Lincoln Park, Michigan, she was the daughter of Jacob and Agnes (née Carlisle) Neal. She spent most of her career at third base, but was also used as a replacement in the outfield and as a pinch-hitter.

Neal entered the league in 1948 with the Springfield Sallies, playing for them in 97 games as part of an infield that included Mildred Meacham at first base, Evelyn Wawryshyn at second, and June Schofield at shortstop. Neal posted a .153 average and stole 23 bases in 122 games, driving in 28 runs and scoring 27 times, while 11 of her 62 hits were for extrabases.

She opened 1949 with the Grand Rapids Chicks, appearing sparingly in 58 games as a replacement player.

In 1988, she was honored along with the rest of the All-American Girls Professional Baseball League during the opening of Women in Baseball, a permanent display based at the Baseball Hall of Fame and Museum in Cooperstown, New York.

Doris Neal was a long time resident of Sarasota, Florida, where she died at the age of 83.

== Career statistics ==
Batting

GP	AB	R	H	2B	3B	HR	RBI	SB	TB	BB	SO	BA	OBP	SLG
180	584	58	76	7	6	0	39	27	95	72	81	.130	.226	.163

Fielding

GP	PO	A	E	TC	DP	FA
183	239	380	71	626	19	.898
