= Marie Mahoney =

American baseball player (1924–2016)

- Outfielder
- Born: September 21, 1924; Houston, Texas, U.S.
- Died: January 23, 2016 (aged 91); Houston, Texas, U.S.
- Batted: Right Threw: Right

Teams
- South Bend Blue Sox (1947–1948); Fort Wayne Daisies (1948)

Emily Marie Mahoney (September 21, 1924 – January 23, 2016) was an outfielder who played from 1947 through 1948 in the All-American Girls Professional Baseball League (AAGPBL). Listed at 5' 3" (1.60 m), 135 lb. (61 k), she batted and threw right-handed.

Born in Houston, Texas, Marie Mahoney was the only Houstonian to play in the AAGPBL during its twelve years of existence. ״Red״, as teammates called her for her hair color, served as fourth outfielder for the two Indiana teams as long as she played in the league.

Mahoney began playing softball at age nine. She also competed in basketball, tennis and volleyball, before joining a women's softball team when she turned 16. After graduating from San Jacinto High School, she continued her excellence on the diamond as she became a perennial Texas state ASA all-star, who led her teams to several state championships. She was primarily a pitcher, and after a brief stint at third base, she found her permanent home in the outfield.

Thanks to a recommendation by fellow AAGPBL catcher Mary Baker, Mahoney became one of two hundred players to attend the first AAGPBL spring training outside the United States, which was held in Cuba at Gran Stadium de La Habana before the 1947 season. She made the grade and was assigned to the South Bend Blue Sox.

In her rookie season, Mahoney hit a .204 average and a .340 of slugging in just 47 games, while ending fifth in triples. She opened 1948 with South Bend but was traded to the Fort Wayne Daisies during the midseason, just in time to help her team reach the playoffs. She batted a combined .140 in 56 games, and went 1-for-5 in two postseason contests.

Mahoney later played softball in Houston. She also worked for Eastman Kodak as a microfilm technician during 32 years, retiring in 1983. She was diagnosed with breast cancer in 1993, but recovered after treatment and returned to her daily life without any difficulty.

She is part of Women in Baseball, a permanent display based at the Baseball Hall of Fame and Museum in Cooperstown, New York, which was unveiled in 1988 to honor the entire All-American Girls Professional Baseball League. In addition, Casey Candaele, former Houston Astros infielder and son of AAGPBL star Helen Callaghan, introduced her for induction into the Texas Baseball Hall of Fame in 2006. Other AAGPBL from Texas were inducted during the ceremony, Alva Jo Fischer and Ruth Lessing, both natives of San Antonio.

An accomplished bowler for 30 years, Marie Mahoney resided in Houston and worked part-time at a local golf course. She died in 2016 at the age of 91.

== Career statistics ==
Batting

GP	AB	R	H	2B	3B	HR	RBI	SB	TB	BB	SO	BA	OBP
103	254	31	45	3	7	1	14	27	TB	16	41	.177	.226

Fielding

GP	PO	A	E	TC	DP	FA
90	96	5	7	108	DP	.935
