= Marie Wegman =

American baseball player (1925–2004)

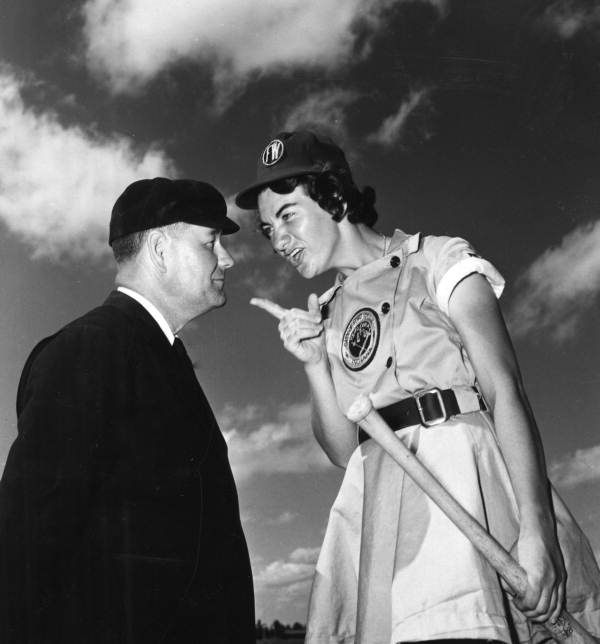
- Utility
- Born: April 30, 1925; Cincinnati, Ohio, U.S.
- Died: January 20, 2004 (aged 78); Delhi Township, Ohio, U.S.
- Batted: Right Threw: Right

Teams
- Rockford Peaches (1947); Fort Wayne Daisies (1948); Muskegon Lassies (1949); Grand Rapids Chicks (1950)

Career highlights and awards
- All-Star Team (1950); Two playoff appearances (1949–1950); Women in Baseball – AAGPBL Permanent Display Baseball Hall of Fame and Museum (1988)

Marie Wegman (April 30, 1925 – January 20, 2004) was a utility infielder-outfielder and pitcher who played from 1948 through 1950 in the All-American Girls Professional Baseball League (AAGPBL). Listed at 5 ft 7 in (1.70 m), 130 lb., she batted and threw right-handed.

== Early years ==
Born in Cincinnati, Ohio, Marie Wegman had her first contact with baseball at the age of three when her father taught her how to throw and hit a ball. The oldest of seven children, she grew up playing scrub baseball with her brothers and the neighborhood boys. She did not play organized softball until she was 14. At the time, softball was not offered at school for girls, so she joined an industrial league and played on several traveling teams.

== Early career ==
Wegman was in a drugstore when she was spotted by a scout of the All-American Girls Professional Baseball League. She was offered a contract, but turned it down. Nevertheless, when Wegman found out she would train in Havana, Cuba and that the pay was more than she was making in a factory, she reconsidered. All the AAGPBL teams stayed at the Seville Biltmore Hotel and were filmed for Fox Movietone News going down the steps at the University of Havana, while their exhibition games were played at Estadio Latinoamericano.

Wegman moved around for a while over a period of four years, as the AAGPBL shifted players as needed to help teams stay afloat. She started the 1947 season with the Rockford Peaches, playing for them one year before joining the Fort Wayne Daisies (1948) and then found herself on the move again, this time to the Muskegon Lassies (1949), and then the Grand Rapids Chicks (1950).

During her first season with the Peaches, Wegman got homesick, although she loved baseball. ″Blackie″, as she was called, played primarily at third base and second base. Eventually, she also played in the outfield and as a relief pitcher. She considered herself more of a defensive player. "I had problems with curveballs", she explained.

== Career ==
Wegman was used sparingly in her first three years. Her most productive came in 1950, her final season, when she posted a career-high .234 batting average in 94 games, driving in 27 runs and scoring 26 times while stealing 22 bases, also career numbers. She was added to the All-Star Team as a replacement player.

In a four-year career, Wegman posted a .180 average and a .231 on-base percentage in 291 games. She pitched briefly in 1948, going 0–0 with a 6.56 earned run average in three games, including nine walks and five strikeouts in 11 innings of work.

She also made two appearances in the post season with Muskegon (1949) and Grand Rapids (1950), going 8-for-31 for a .258 average with three runs, two RBI and two stolen bases in nine games.

== Career after baseball ==
Following her baseball career, Wegman returned home to help out her family. She regretted her father's absence, because he died in 1945 and was not able to see her play professional baseball. She attended classes at the University of Cincinnati while working as a designer of packaging equipment and machinery. She later worked for Lodge & Shipley company until her retirement in 1988. Late in the year, she became part of Women in Baseball, a permanent display based at the Baseball Hall of Fame and Museum in Cooperstown, New York, which was unveiled to honor the entire All-American Girls Professional Baseball League rather than individual baseball personalities.

== Death ==
Marie Wegman died of a heart failure in Delhi Township, Ohio at the age of 78.

== Career statistics ==
Batting

GP	AB	R	H	2B	3B	HR	RBI	SB	BB	SO	BA	OBP	SLG
291	834	60	150	14	13	1	51	51	102	119	.180	.272	.231

Collective fielding

GP	PO	A	E	TC	DP	FA
247	349	527	92	968	32	.905
