= Marion Watson =

Canadian baseball player

Marion Watson Stanton (2 July 1923, Chatham, Ontario, Canada – 15 July 1997) was a pitcher in the All-American Girls Professional Baseball League (AAGPBL). She threw left-handed and batted right-handed.

== Early baseball career ==
Before she went pro, Watson played baseball for local teams in Southwestern Ontario, such as the Chatham Ladies Silverwoods team and the Maple City Laundry team. When the latter team won the Ontario Championship, it was Marion who led them in hitting, boasting a .153 average. In 1945 she played with the Windsor Dairy team and it was during that time – while participating in a game in the Michigan–Ontario League – that she was scouted to play professionally.

== Professional baseball career ==
During her professional baseball career, Marion played for two teams: the Peoria Redwings (eight games in 1946) and the Muskegon Lassies (in 1947). She has been called a tall southpaw. She took home $55 a week and all expenses paid during her professional career. Quite shortly after she signed a contract with the Lassies, during spring training in Cuba, she broke her leg while sliding into home plate. A year later she broke her leg again in a motorbike accident. It was those two injuries, in 1949, that culminated in the premature demise of her professional baseball career.

In 1988, all AAGPBL players were recognized by the National Baseball Hall of Fame in Cooperstown, New York. In 1998, all Canadian members of the AAGPBL were inducted as honorary members into the Canadian Baseball Hall of Fame in St. Mary's, Ontario. In the same year, a plaque was erected in her honor in Tecumseh Park, which was the location where she began her career. The Marion Watson Stanton Memorial Trophy is presented annually to the most sportsmanlike pitcher in Chatham Ladies Softball League.

== Retirement ==
Although by 1949 she had retired from playing at the professional level, Marion remained active locally. She played golf twice a week at the Ridgetown Golf Club and in 1984 even won the championship. She loved to bowl, playing with the Branch 28 Legion team in the Maple City Bowling League, with an average of more than 200.

== Career statistics ==
| Year | G | AB | R | H | 2B | 3B | HR | RBI | SB | BB | SO | AVG |
|---|---|---|---|---|---|---|---|---|---|---|---|---|
| 1946 | 8 | 11 | – | 0 | – | – | – | – | – | – | – | .000 |
| 1947 | – | – | – | – | – | – | – | – | – | – | – | - |
