= Theresa Klosowski =

Teams
- Muskegon Lassies (1948)

Career highlights and awards
- Women in Baseball – AAGPBL Permanent Display at the Baseball Hall of Fame and Museum (since 1988)

Theresa Klosowski was an American All-American Girls Professional Baseball League player.

Theresa Klosowski joined the league with the Muskegon Lassies in the 1948 season. She appeared in two games and went hitless in two at bats.

In 1988 was inaugurated a permanent display at the Baseball Hall of Fame and Museum at Cooperstown, New York, that honors those who were part of the All-American Girls Professional Baseball League. Theresa Klosowski, along with the rest of the girls and the league staff, is included at the display/exhibit.
