= Mary Moore (pitcher) =

American baseball player

- Pitcher
- Born: March 6, 1922; Lemon Grove, California, U.S.
- Died: July 12, 1962 (aged 40); Lemon Grove, California, U.S.
- Batted: Right Threw: Right

Teams
- Rockford Peaches (1948)

Career highlights and awards
- Championship team (1948)

Mary Frances Moore (March 6, 1922 – July 12, 1962) was a pitcher who played in the All-American Girls Professional Baseball League (AAGPBL). She was born in Lemon Grove, California.

Moore spent one season in the league with the 1948 Rockford Peaches champion team. She posted a 2-3 pitching record in eight games and batted an average of .222 (4-for-18).

She died in 1962 in her home of Lemon Grove, California, at the age of 40.

In 1988 was inaugurated a permanent display at the Baseball Hall of Fame and Museum in Cooperstown, New York that honors those who were part of the All-American Girls Professional Baseball League. Mary Moore, along with the rest of the girls and the league staff, is included at the display/exhibit.

== Pitching statistics ==
GP	W	L	W-L%	ERA	IP	H	RA	ER	BB	SO	HBP	WP	WHIP
8	2	3	.400	4.00	45	31	23	20	40	5	4	2	1.58
