= Mary Moore (infielder) =

American baseball player

- Second base
- Born: July 7, 1932 (age 93); Detroit, Michigan, U.S.
- Bats: Right Throws: Right

Teams
- Springfield Sallies (1950); Battle Creek Belles (1951–1952)

Mary Ann Moore (born July 7, 1932) is a former All-American Girls Professional Baseball League infielder. Listed at 5' 5", 145 lb., Moore batted and threw right handed. She was dubbed 'Sis' by her teammates.

Mary Moore played in the All-American League from 1950 through 1952 before a series of injuries hampered her career.

== Life and career ==
Born in Detroit, Michigan, Moore was 15 when she started to play fastpitch softball for the Wyandotte Chemicals team in a Michigan industrial league. She later graduated from Lincoln Park High School in 1950.

In between, Mary learned her baseball skills from her neighbor Eddie Lake, a former shortstop for the St. Louis Cardinals, Boston Red Sox and Detroit Tigers who often joined the local kids on the sandlots ball for a game. She got her chance to play through an English teacher at her high school who introduced her to a former All-American League player, Doris Neal. Under Neal's guidance, Moore went to South Bend, Indiana for a tryout and was assigned to play at second base for the traveling Springfield Sallies in 1950.

By then, the Sallies and the Chicago Colleens played exhibition games and recruited new talent for the league, as they toured through the South and East. Highlights of these tours included contests at Griffith Stadium in Washington, D.C. and Yankee Stadium in New York. As a result, Mary led the Sallies in games played (77), hits (75), runs batted in (48), total bases (95) and walks (61), while hitting three home runs and scoring 65 runs to also lead the team. But her greatest thrill on the tour was playing in Yankee Stadium and meeting Yogi Berra, Joe DiMaggio, Billy Martin and Phil Rizzuto, among other Yankees legends. After that, she was promoted to the Battle Creek Belles expansion team for the upcoming season.

During the off-season, Moore worked in an auto parts factory and had two fingers partially cut off in a punch press. As a result, she thought her professional baseball career was finished before it had started. The injury was reminiscent of the one suffered by dead-ball era pitching star Mordecai Brown, who in his youth lost parts of two fingers on his right hand in an accident in a corn grinder. Through the years, Brown turned this handicap into an advantage by learning how to grip a baseball in a way that resulted in an exceptional curveball and pitched for seven different Major League clubs in a span of 14 seasons from 1903 to 1916, gaining induction to the Baseball Hall of Fame in 1949. Brown was nicknamed Three Finger, a moniker that he proudly used throughout his life. Moore was aware of that and felt better. Therefore, the injury did not stop her from going to spring training four months later.

The determined Moore practiced with the Belles at training camp but team officials decided she was not ready to start the 1951 season. Towards the end of the season, she got a call to join the team when its lineup was depleted due to injuries. She appeared in a few games and retained her rookie status. She became a regular in 1952, but her injured hand hindered her development. Then, during the midseason she sprained her right ankle while sliding into second base and her season was over. Moore was offered a contract to return to following season but she decided not to go back to the league. Moore was disappointed by her limited playing time due to her injuries, as she explained in an interview with historian W. C. Madden. It was a hard decision because she loved to play baseball.

Moore hit .148 (13-for-88) with a .306 OBP and one double in 42 games for Battle Creek, driving in one run and scoring 11 more while stealing five bases.

Afterwards, Moore worked for AT&T for 35 years before retiring in 1989. She then enjoyed bowling, and playing golf and softball, as well as participating in AAGPBL Players Association activities.

The All-American League folded at the end of the 1954 season, but since 1988 there is a permanent display at the Baseball Hall of Fame and Museum at Cooperstown, New York that honors the players and the league staff rather than any individual figure.
