= Bernice Metesch =

American baseball player (born 1929)

Bernice Metesh
- Outfield utility / Pitcher
- Born: August 9, 1929 (age 97); Joliet, Illinois, U.S.
- Bats: Right Throws: Right
- Stats at Baseball Reference

Teams
- Rockford Peaches (1948); South Bend Blue Sox (1948)

Career highlights and awards
- Women in Baseball – AAGPBL Permanent Display at the Baseball Hall of Fame and Museum (unveiled in 1988)

Bernice Metesh or Bernice Metesch (born August 9, 1929) is an American former baseball outfielder and pitcher who played in the All-American Girls Professional Baseball League (AAGPBL). Listed at 5' 6" and 132 lb, Metesh batted and threw right-handed. She was dubbed 'Bernie' by her teammates.

== Early life and education ==
Metesh was born in Joliet, Illinois on 9 August 1929. She attended Providence High School in Joliet where she graduated in 1947. Metesh's brother Jim played hockey and her brother Bob also played baseball.

== Career ==
=== Professional ===
Metesh joined the All-American League in its 1948 season when she was 17. She played for the South Bend Blue Sox before being assigned to the Rockford Peaches. Metesh played in at least 3 games.

Metesh started for South Bend against the Kenosha Comets on 25 April 1948. The South Bend Tribune described it as an "impressive display", with Metesh gave up only 4 hits in South Bend's 2–4 loss.

Metesh was assigned to the Rockford Peaches in mid-June. She played on 30 June 1948 for the Rockford Peaches against South Bend, coming off in the 7th. She played again on 6 July 1948 for the Rockford Peaches in a game against the Racine Belles in which she had 1 at bat and 1 assist but a player stole home off her pitching.

=== Semi-professional ===
Afterwards, she returned to Joliet and pitched for an all-male fastpitch softball team. Metesh joined the semi-professional St Joseph's American Legion team, on which her brother, Bob, was the also the team's catcher. She won selection after playing in an exhibition match against the Joliet Americans on 20 July 1948.

== Hall of Fame ==
In 1988 was inaugurated a permanent display at the Baseball Hall of Fame and Museum at Cooperstown, New York, that honors those who were part of the All-American Girls Professional Baseball League. Bernie Metesh along with the rest of the girls and the league staff, is included at the display/exhibit.
