= Sarah Lonetto =

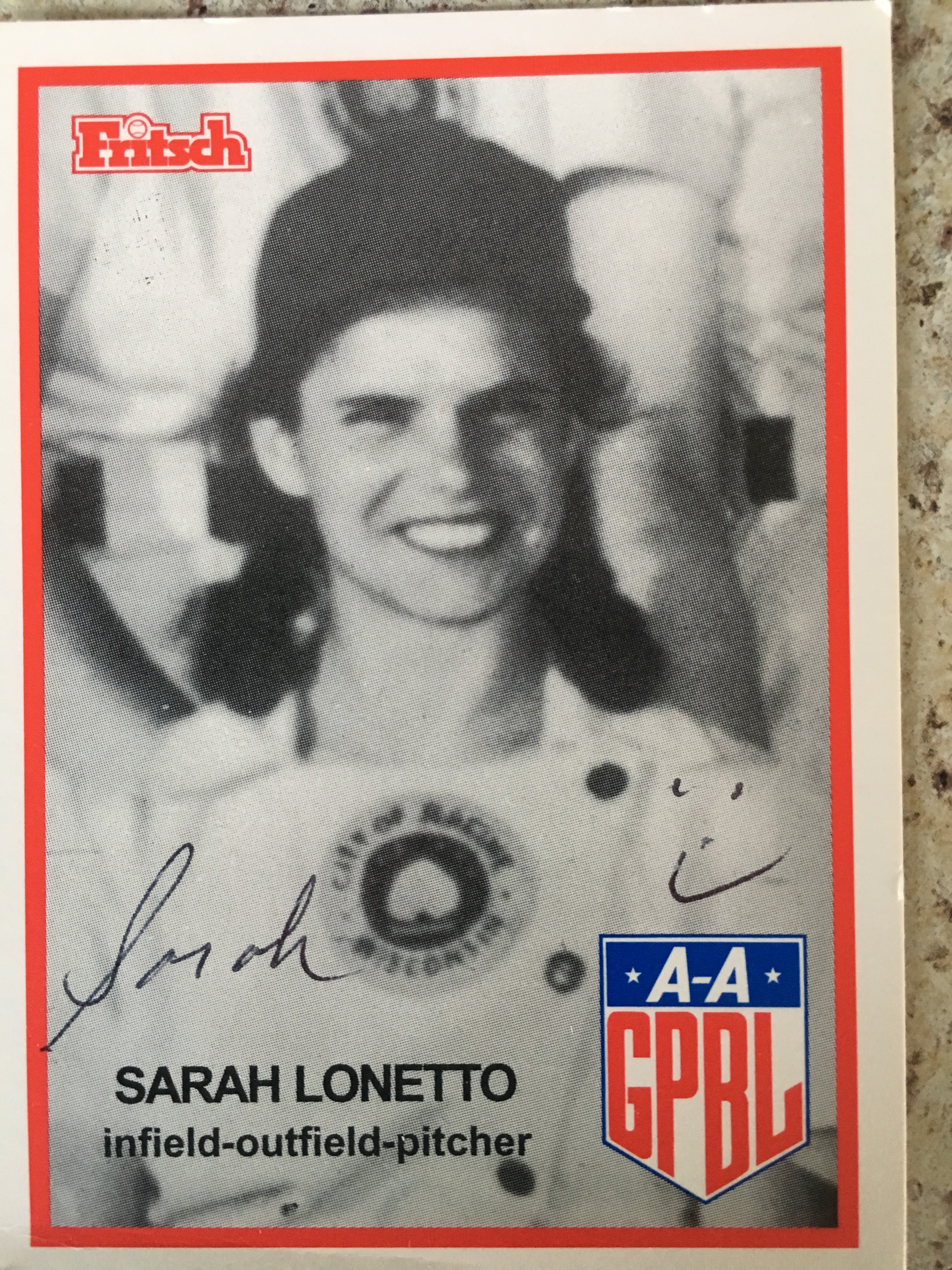
Sarah Lonetto nickname Tomato

Sarah Lonetto (June 9, 1922 – April 24, 2009) played for the All-American Girls Professional Baseball League between 1947 and 1949. She was born in Detroit, Michigan. As a professional baseball player for the league, Lonetto threw right-handed and batted both right- and left-handed. Her nickname was Tomato.

== Baseball career ==
Lonetto started playing amateur ball at around 15 years old. She was taken to ball games in Fairview with her brothers. At 24 years old, she began playing for the league. In 1943 she was approached by Philip Wrigley who she remembers was "really nice." Four years later she started playing for the Racine Belles. The two other teams Lonetto played for were the Muskegon Lassies (in 1948, 1949), with manager Bill Wambsganss and the Rockford Peaches. She believes she earned herself the nickname Tomato from a friend who started calling her that, because she had a rather red complexion.

Although she thought all the teams she played in were great, Lonetto had a particular fondness for the Racine Belles. But, overall, all the girls were great.

In 1988 she attended an AAGPBL reunion that took place at the Baseball Hall of Fame, Cooperstown, New York.

== A league of their own ==
Lonetto was pleased with how the movie came out. She had two copies of it. She commented: “It's pretty good, pretty darn good. We all stayed with Penny Marshall and her brother Gary and we explained everything to them the way it was and they enjoyed it. From there Gary Marshall took it upon himself and was really good!”

== Pitching records ==
Year	G	IP	R	ER	ERA	BB	SO	HB	WP	W	L	PCT
1948	17	97	48	30	2.78	57	12	1	1	3	9	.250
1949	3	12	-	-	-	-	-	-	-	-	-	.000

== Batting records ==
Year	G	AB	R	H	2B	3B	HR	RBI	SB	BB	SO	AVG
1947	22	61	0	7	0	0	0	0	2	1	12	.115
1948	53	109	21	20	2	1	1	4	4	18	14	.183
1949	27	55	4	5	0	0	0	0	2	1	11	.091
