= Phyllis Carlson =

American baseball player

Phyllis Carlson was an All-American Girls Professional Baseball League player. She was born in Chicago, Illinois.

Carlson appears as a member of the Muskegon Lassies club during its 1949 season. She did not have individual records or some information was incomplete.

The AAGPBL folded in 1954, but there is a permanent display at the Baseball Hall of Fame and Museum at Cooperstown, New York, since November 5, 1988, that honors the entire league rather than any individual figure.
