= Pauline Hill =

American baseball player (1926–2012)

Pauline Dennert
- Left fielder
- Born: April 8, 1926; Hart, Michigan, U.S.
- Died: September 17, 2012 (aged 86); Owosso, Michigan, U.S.
- Batted: Right Threw: Right

Teams
- Muskegon Lassies (1947)

Career highlights and awards
- 1947 AAGPBL champion team (1947); Women in Baseball – AAGPBL Permanent Display at the Baseball Hall of Fame and Museum (since 1988)

Pauline Dennert (later Hill; April 8, 1926 – September 17, 2012) was an American outfielder who played for the Muskegon Lassies of the All-American Girls Professional Baseball League (AAGPBL) in 1947. Listed at 5' 4", 145 lb., she batted and threw right handed. Born in Hart, Michigan, she played under her maiden name and was nicknamed "Denny."

Pauline appeared in three games for the Lassies and went hitless in four at-bats.

Afterwards, she earned a physical education degree from the Western Michigan University and later worked as the summer recreation director and swim instructor in Hart.
