= Therese McKinley =

American baseball player (1928–2021)

- Fourth outfielder
- Born: February 28, 1928; Chicago, Illinois, U.S.
- Died: May 26, 2021 (aged 93); Des Plaines, Illinois, U.S.
- Batted: Right Threw: Right

Teams
- Muskegon Lassies (1949)

Career highlights and awards
- Women in Baseball – AAGPBL Permanent Display at the Baseball Hall of Fame and Museum (unveiled in 1988)

Therese McKinley (later Uselmann; February 28, 1928 – May 26, 2021) was an All-American Girls Professional Baseball League player. Listed at 5' 6", 135 lb., she batted and threw right handed. She was dubbed "Terry" by her teammates.

Therese McKinley shared the outfield duties with nine other players during her only season in the league with the Muskegon Lassies.

Born in Chicago, Illinois, McKinley began playing with 14-inch softball in the Chicago Park District at age nine. She later attended Notre Dame Academy in Chicago, where she played intramural basketball and volleyball because there were no other sports available for girls at that time. Additionally, she played softball during six years in the local leagues and one year in an industrial league for men.

In 1948, when she was 20, she read an advertisement in the Chicago Tribune and attended a tryout with the All American League in 1948. She made the grade and was assigned to one of the four farm teams operated by the league in Chicago, where she hit a very solid .402 batting average and showed her blazing speed on the bases and the field.

In 1949, McKinley joined the league and was assigned to Muskegon. But she had problems hitting the curveball and struggled at the plate. As a result, she hit .099 (10-for-101) and stole seven bases in just 37 games, driving in four runs while scoring ten times. Nevertheless, she was virtually flawless defensively, recording 38 putouts with three assists and turned two double plays, committing only two errors in 43 total chances for a .953 fielding average.

Even so, she improved as the season wore on and Lassies manager Carson Bigbee put her in the lineup during the playoffs. Muskegon was undefeated in the best-of-three first round but was swept in the best-of-five second round. Therese appeared in all five playoff games and went 4-for-16 with two runs, one RBI and four stolen bases. At the field, she recorded three putouts without committing an error. She returned home and played more softball before joining the United States Navy during Korean War conflict. Afterwards, she enrolled at DePaul University and earned her Bachelor of Science degree in 1958 and her Master of Arts degree in 1963.

McKinley married Duane P. Uselmann on November 24, 1960, he died in 2020. They had five children, four girls and one boy as well as ten grandchildren. In between, she held a teaching job for 30 years and coached a variety of different sports teams before retiring in 1995. She later moved to Park Ridge, a suburb of Chicago, to remain in the area and enjoy time spent with her four grandchildren and participating in AAGPBL Players Association activities.

The All American League folded at the end of the 1954 season, but there is a permanent display at the Baseball Hall of Fame and Museum at Cooperstown, New York, since 1988 that honors the entire league rather than any individual figure.

McKinley died on May 26, 2021, at her home in Des Plaines, Illinois.
