= Muskegon Lassies =

1940s American women's baseball team

1946 Muskegon Lassies Front row, L-R: Alva Jo Fischer, Dorothy Maguire, Elizabeth Wicken, Charlene Pryer, Miss Hack, Erma Bergmann. Second row, L-R: Eunice Kessler (chaperone), Sara Reeser, Pauline Martin, Donna Cook, Arleene Johnson, Dorothy Montgomery, Josephine Lenard, Buzz Boyle (manager). Back row, L-R: Lavina Keough, Mary Rini, Amy Applegren, Joanne Overleese, Margaret Wenzell.

The Muskegon Lassies were a professional baseball team based in Muskegon, Michigan that competed in the All-American Girls Professional Baseball League (AAGPBL). The Lassies were formed as one of two expansions teams in the 1946 season. The team played their home games at Marsh Field from 1946 to 1950. The team was the regular season champion in 1947; noteworthy players included Doris Sams, who won the league Player of the Year Award twice with the team. In 1950, the team relocated midway through the season to Kalamazoo.

The league, its teams, and its story were later depicted in A League of Their Own.

== History ==
The 1946 Muskegon Lassies posted a 46–66 record in their first year, and placed sixth in the eight–team league. They improved to 69–43 in 1947, to win a close pennant race with the Grand Rapids Chicks. Muskegon was led by OF/P Doris Sams, who ranked in several offensive categories and also collected 11 victories, including a perfect game, good enough to win the Most Valuable Player Award. Notably, the team counted with three of the top four pitchers in earned run average, Sams (0.98), Amy Irene Applegren (1.06) and Nancy Warren (1.13), but lost to the Racine Belles in the best-of-five, first-round matchup 3–1.

Muskegon went 66–57 in 1948 to gain a playoff berth, but lost to the Fort Wayne Daisies in the first round, three to zero games.

The team dropped to 46–66 in 1949 but was able to reach the playoffs for the third consecutive year. Muskegon disposed of the Kenosha Comets in the first round, 3–1, being swept by the South Bend Blue Sox in the semifinals, 3–0.

1950 became a nightmare for Muskegon, after registering the worst record in the league (36–73) and a relocation during the midseason to Kalamazoo, Michigan, where the team was renamed the Kalamazoo Lassies.

== All-time roster ==
Bold denotes members of the inaugural roster

- Gertrude Alderfer
- Beatrice Allard
- Melba Alspaugh
- **Amy Applegren**
- Norene Arnold
- Doris Barr
- Patricia Barringer
- **Erma Bergmann**
- Jaynne Bittner
- Shirley Burkovich
- Phyllis Carlson
- Ann Cindric
- **Donna Cook**
- Gloria Cordes
- **Gladys Davis**
- Betty Degner
- Pauline Dennert
- Peggy Fenton
- **Alva Jo Fischer**
- Anita Foss
- Betty Francis
- Genevieve George
- Julie Gutz
- **Miss Hack**
- Helen Hannah
- Josephine Hasham
- Alice Hohlmayer
- Margaret Holgerson
- Anna Mae Hutchison
- **Arleene Johnson**
- Marilyn Jones
- Glenna Sue Kidd
- **Theresa Klosowski**
- Arlene Kotil
- Marie Kruckel
- **Josephine Lenard**
- Sarah Lonetto
- Therese McKinley
- **Dorothy Maguire**
- **Pauline Martin**
- Naomi Meier
- **Norma Metrolis**
- **Dorothy Montgomery**
- **Eve Mytrysak**
- **Eileen O'Brien**
- **Joanne Overleese**
- Barbara Payne
- Marguerite Pearson
- Betty Petryna
- **Charlene Pryer**
- **Sara Reeser**
- **Mary Rini**
- **Juanita Roylance**
- **Doris Sams**
- June Schofield
- **Delores Seigfried**
- **Dorothy Stolze**
- Doris Tetzlaff
- Kathryn Vonderau
- Betty Wagoner
- Helen Walulik
- **Nancy Warren**
- Marion Watson
- **Evelyn Wawryshyn**
- Marie Wegman
- **Margaret Wenzell**
- **Elizabeth Wicken**
- Renae Youngberg

== Managers ==
* Buzz Boyle	1946
* Bill Wambsganss	1947; 1948
* Carson Bigbee	1949; 1950 [first half]

== Sources ==
- The All-American Girls Professional Baseball League Record Book – W. C. Madden. Publisher: McFarland & Company, 2000. Format: Hardcover, 302pp. Language: English. ISBN 978-0-7864-0597-8
- Encyclopedia of Women and Baseball' – Leslie A. Heaphy, Mel Anthony May. Publisher: McFarland & Company, 2006. Format: Paperback, 438pp. Language: English. ISBN 0-7864-2100-2
