= Erma Bergmann =

- Pitcher / Outfielder
- Born: June 18, 1924; Saint Louis, Missouri, U.S.
- Died: September 13, 2015 (aged 91); Saint Louis, Missouri, U.S.
- Batted: Right Threw: Right

Teams
- Muskegon Lassies (1946–1947); Springfield Sallies (1948); Racine Belles (1949–1950); Battle Creek Belles (1951)

Career highlights and awards
- Pitched a no-hitter (1947); Women in Baseball – AAGPBL Permanent Display at Baseball Hall of Fame and Museum (1988); St. Louis Amateur Softball Hall of Fame – 1996 Inductee; Missouri Sports Hall of Fame – 2007 Inductee

Erma M. "Bergie" Bergmann (June 18, 1924 – September 13, 2015) was an American baseball pitcher and outfielder who played from 1946 through 1951 in the All-American Girls Professional Baseball League (AAGPBL). Listed at 5 ft 7 in (1.70 m), 155 lb., she batted and threw right-handed. She later served as one of the first commissioned police women in the city of St. Louis.

== Early life ==
Born in St. Louis, Missouri, Erma Bergmann was one of three children into the family of Otto and Sophie Bergmann. Her father was a packinghouse butcher, while her mother, a ragtime pianist, wanted her only daughter to take piano lessons. But Erma declined, preferring to play sandlot ball with her two brothers and other neighborhood kids. At fourteen, she began playing at third base in the St. Louis Amateur Softball League since other opportunities at school were limited. At fifteen, she played shortstop for the Melbas, a girls' softball team at St. Louis Park, and pitched for the Phantoms, a boys' baseball team, pitching ten straight victories. After eight years of experience, she was recruited by an AAGPBL scout that followed her for three years before signing a contract to play after graduation.

== Career ==
Since the only organized ball for women in the country was softball, the AAGPBL created a hybrid game which included both softball and baseball. Over the twelve years of history of the league, the rules were gradually modified to more closely resemble baseball. Throwing underhand, Bergmann was one of the few AAGPBL hurlers to pitch all three styles in the league's history, being able to make the transition to full sidearm in 1947 and overhand pitching in 1948.

Bergmann entered the league in 1946 with the expansion Muskegon Lassies, playing for them two years before joining the Springfield Sallies (1948), Racine Belles (1949–1950) and Battle Creek Belles (1951).

In her rookie season, Bergmann posted a 15–16 record and a 2.05 earned run average in 35 pitching appearances, top numbers for the sixth-place Lassies. She also spent time at outfield, hitting a .255 average in 50 games. Her biggest thrill in her season debut came when she belted her only career home run in the top of the ninth inning of a game against the Rockford Peaches. She then shut down the Peaches in the bottom of the inning for a victory with her parents in attendance.

In 1947 the AAGPBL moved its spring training camp to Havana, Cuba, and Bergmann was one of the two hundred girls who made the trip. That season she was used strictly as a pitcher. She ended the season with an 11–10 mark and a solid 1.74 ERA in 27 games, helping the Lassies win the pennant. In addition, she tossed a no-hitter against the host Grand Rapids Chicks on May 22 of that year.

For the rest of her career, Bergmann played for awful teams and her season records reflect reflected it. She went 9–19 in 1948, though she recorded a 3.05 ERA. Then, she finished 11–14 with a 2.09 ERA in 1949, and went 11–14 with a 2.68 ERA in 1950. Her worst season came in 1951, when she went 7–18 with a 3.92 ERA while leading the league in losses, runs allowed (119) and earned runs (87). It would be her last year in the league.

After that, Bergmann moved to Chicago and played in the rival National Girls Baseball League from 1952 to 1954. During this stint, she tied two league records by pitching a 23-inning game and hitting five singles in a game.

=== Later career ===
Following her baseball career, Bergmann became one of the first commissioned police women in the city of St. Louis. She retired in 1981 after 25 years of exemplary service in the St. Louis Police Department.

In 1988, Bergmann became part of Women in Baseball, a permanent display based at the Baseball Hall of Fame and Museum in Cooperstown, New York, which was unveiled to honor the entire All-American Girls Professional Baseball League rather than any individual personality. Then, in 1996 she gained induction in the St. Louis Amateur Softball Hall of Fame, and also was inducted into the Missouri Sports Hall of Fame in 2007.

== Career statistics ==
Pitching

GP	W	L	W-L%	ERA	IP	H	RA	ER	BB	SO
182	64	91	.413	3.28	1076	1046	627	381	462	338

Batting

GP	AB	R	H	2B	3B	HR	RBI	SB	TB	BB	SO	BA	OBP	SLG
219	552	39	111	11	2	1	39	7	129	40	56	.201	.255	.234
