= Jo Anne Overleese =

American baseball player (1923–2017)

- Second base
- Born: October 3, 1923; La Jolla, San Diego, California, U.S.
- Died: May 9, 2017 (aged 93); Tucson, Arizona, U.S.
- Batted: Right Threw: Right

Teams
- Muskegon Lassies (1946); Peoria Redwings (1946)

Jo Anne (also Joanne) Overleese (October 3, 1923 – May 15, 2017) was an infielder who played in the All-American Girls Professional Baseball League (AAGPBL). She batted and threw right handed.

Born in La Jolla, San Diego, California, Overleese is better known as one of the few doctors to have played in league history. Overleese started playing softball at age nine. In 1940, she graduated from Herbert Hoover High School in Glendale, California, where she had the chance to play Amateur Athletic Union basketball and softball state tournaments. as a member of Tornadoes teams.

In 1946, Overleese attended a tryout with the All-American League and later went to Pascagoula, Mississippi to the league's formal spring training. That year she played at second base for the Muskegon Lassies and the Peoria Redwings, a pair of expansion teams at the time. That was her only season in the league.

In 54 career games, Overleese batted .178 (31-for-174) with four doubles and one triple, driving in 15 runs and scoring 13 times, while stealing six bases. As a fielder, she recorded 120 putouts with 96 assists and turned 15 double plays, while committing 15 errors in 231 chances for a .936 fielding average.

After baseball, Overleese decided to become a doctor and attended San Diego State University for a year and then four years at the University of California, Berkeley. She finished her residency and internship in general surgery in the Woman's Medical College of Pennsylvania and went on to have 25–year career as a general surgeon in Philadelphia.

Overleese retired from practice in 1977 and went into the emergency department for another 10 years. In between, she established a Medical Doctors Professional Association company in 1974, and opened offices in Philadelphia, Pennsylvania and in Trenton, New Jersey, where she performed minor surgery.

The AAGPBL folded in 1954, but a permanent display at the Baseball Hall of Fame and Museum at Cooperstown, New York was established November 5, 1988 that honors those who were part of this unique experience. Overleese, along with the rest of the league's girls and staff, is included at the display.

Toward the end of her life, Overleese developed kidney disease and had a broken hip. Shortly her death she moved from La Jolla to Tucson to live closer to her partner's niece as her partner has Alzheimer's. She died peacefully on May 15, 2017.
