= Mary Rini =

American baseball player (1925–2019)

Mari Rini
- Pitcher
- Born: March 5, 1925; Detroit, Michigan, U.S.
- Died: September 5, 2019 (aged 94); Detroit, Michigan, U.S.
- Batted: Right Threw: Right

Teams
- Kenosha Comets (1945); Muskegon Lassies (1946)

Mary Rini (March 5, 1925 – September 4, 2019) was an American former pitcher who played in the All-American Girls Professional Baseball League (AAGPBL). Listed at 5' 6", 145 lb., Rini batted and threw right handed. She was born in Detroit, Michigan.

Rini was a below average pitcher during her AAGPBL career. She entered the league in 1945 with the Kenosha Comets, before joining the Muskegon Lassies in 1946.

In a two-season career, Rini posted a 2–12 record and an ERA of 3.62 in 23 pitching appearances, allowing 103 hits and 48 walks, while striking out only 15 batters in 112.0 innings of work. In 1945 she committed six balks, which tied her for the most in the league.

The AAGPBL folded in 1954, but there is a permanent display at the Baseball Hall of Fame and Museum at Cooperstown, New York, since November 5, 1988, that honors the entire league rather than any individual figure.
