= Eve Mytrysak =

American baseball player

- Pitcher
- Born: Wywilia Carolyn Mytrysak; September 17, 1924; Homer City, Pennsylvania, U.S.
- Died: February 11, 1996 (aged 71); Munhall, Pennsylvania, U.S.

Teams
- Muskegon Lassies (1949)

Wywilia Carolyn "Vi" Mytrysak (Note: She is misidentified as "Vivian Mystrysak" by All-American Girls Professional Baseball League website. Through the 1930 Census, the family name was transcribed variously as Mytryck, Matrisok, Mytrisak, and Mytryrzak.) (September 17, 1924 – February 11, 1996), known as Eve Mytrysak, was an All-American Girls Professional Baseball League player.

In September 1948, Mytrysak made her debut for the co-ed Waterman Baseball Club in Indiana, Pennsylvania, part of the Rochester and Pittsburgh Baseball League, as the first female pitcher in the county. Mytrysak played for the Muskegon Lassies club in its 1949 season.

Mytrysak was born in Homer City, Pennsylvania, one of 10 children born to Paul Mytrysak, a coal miner, and Katerina "Kata" Urban, ethnic Ukrainians born in 19th-century Poland who immigrated to the United States in 1907 and 1910, respectively. Her brother John Mytrysak, her teammate on the Waterman team, was drafted by the New York Giants in 1949 and played in the minor leagues.

She married Stephen Zeransky, with whom she had sons Tom, Ed and Stephen Jr. She owned Vi's Pizza in Munhall, Pennsylvania. She died in 1996.

In 1988, a permanent display was inaugurated at the Baseball Hall of Fame and Museum in Cooperstown, New York that honors those who were part of the All-American Girls Professional Baseball League. Mytrysak, along with the rest of the women and the league staff, is included at the display/exhibit.
