= Eileen O'Brien (baseball) =

- Born: May 24, 1922
- Died: August 30, 2015 (aged 93)
- Batted: Right Threw: Right

Teams
- Muskegon Lassies (1946)

Eileen O'Brien (May 24, 1922 – August 30, 2015) played in the All-American Girls Professional Baseball League (AAGPBL) in 1946. With the Muskegon Lassies, she had a batting average of .111 with two hits and 18 at-bats. She later taught in public schools in Chicago.
