= Pauline Martin (baseball) =

American baseball player

- Born: Columbus, Ohio, U.S.

Teams
- Muskegon Lassies (1946)

Pauline Martin was an All-American Girls Professional Baseball League player.

Born in Columbus, Ohio, Pauline Martin joined the All American League in its 1946 season and was assigned to the Muskegon Lassies club. Additional information is incomplete because there are no records available at the time of the request.

In 1988, she was inaugurated at a permanent display at the Baseball Hall of Fame and Museum at Cooperstown, New York, that honors those who were part of the All-American Girls Professional Baseball League. Pauline Martin, along with the rest of the girls and the league staff, is included at the display/exhibit.
