= Alva Jo Fischer =

- Pitcher / Shortstop
- Born: August 26, 1926; San Antonio, Texas, U.S.
- Died: August 13, 1973 (aged 46); San Antonio, Texas, U.S.
- Batted: Right Threw: Right

Teams
- Rockford Peaches (1945); Muskegon Lassies (1946–1949)

Career highlights and awards
- Championship Team (1945); Four playoffs appearances (1945, 1947–1949); Led all shortstops in fielding average (1946); Honors and Recognitions: Alva Jo Fischer Softball Complex (1975); San Antonio Sports Hall of Fame (1998); Texas Baseball Hall of Fame (2006); Women in Baseball – AAGPBL Permanent Display at Baseball Hall of Fame and Museum (1988)

Alva Jo Fischer (August 26, 1926 – August 13, 1973) was a pitcher and shortstop who played from 1945 through 1949 in the All-American Girls Professional Baseball League (AAGPBL). Listed at 5 ft 9 in (1.75 m), 135 lb., she batted and threw right-handed.

Fischer was born in San Antonio, Texas, and played for the all-state team at first base in 1938. She entered the All-American Girls Professional Baseball League in 1945 with the Rockford Peaches, playing for them one year before joining the Muskegon Lassies for the rest of her five-year career. Nicknamed ״Tex״ by her teammates, Fischer was used primarily as a pitcher, but later became a highly competent shortstop as well.

In her rookie season, Fischer posted a 4–7 record with a 3.77 earned run average and 98 innings of work in 16 pitching appearances. The Peaches, managed by Bill Allington, won the regular season title with a 67–43 mark. They increased their dominance during the postseason, when defeated the Grand Rapids Chicks in the best-of-five first round, three to one games, and claimed the championship by winning the Fort Wayne Daisies in the best-of-seven series, four to one games. In the final series, Fischer hurled three shutout innings of relief.

When Fischer joined the expansion Lassies in 1946, the team's manager Buzz Boyle experimented with her at shortstop, where she was able to use her great throwing arm while sharing duties with Dorothy Stolze. She also contributed with an 11–16 pitching record and a 2.77 ERA in 29 games.

Fischer became the everyday shortstop for Muskegon in 1947. While adapting to her new role, Fischer did not pitch during the season. She committed 58 errors in 586 chances for a poor .901 fielding average, and batted only .202 in 112 games. Muskegon clinched the championship with two days remaining on the regular schedule and advanced to the postseason, only to be defeated in the best-of-five first round by Racine, three games to one.

In 1948 Fischer improved at shortstop, showing excellent range and lowering her error rate (36) compared to the previous year, raising her fielding average to .917. She also returned to pitch and went 9–7 with a 1.47 ERA in 21 appearances, while hitting .252 with 31 runs and 36 runs batted in in 107 games. In addition, her ERA was the ninth best in the league. Muskegon was upset by Fort Wayne in the best-of-five first round, three to two games. Fischer was charged with one of the losses, after allowing one run and five hits in six innings of work.

Fischer enjoyed a career year in 1949, her last season, when she became the best shortstop in the league with a .972 average and only 23 errors in 481 fielding chances while turning in 48 double plays. She batted only .198 in 109 games, but posted a 10–7 record with a 1.78 ERA and a career-high 86 strikeouts in 25 games pitched, ending eight for the most strikeouts. Muskegon swept Kenosha in the first round, two to zero games, but lost the second round to Grand Rapids, three to zero games. Fischer shutout Kenosha with a four-hit, 3–0 victory in Game 1 of the best-of-three series. She then labored through 13 innings to Grand Rapids in the next step, allowing twelve hits and four earned runs, but did not have a decision.

In a five-year career, Fischer posted a 34–37 record and a 2.40 ERA in 91 pitching appearances, while hitting a .223 average with 91 runs and 131 RBI in 345 games. As a fielder, she committed only 117 errors in 1,500 chances for a solid .922 average. In seven postseason games, she went 1–1 with a 1.20 ERA and hit .125 (6-for-48) in 13 games.

Fischer died of leukemia in San Antonio, Texas, at the age of 47. Fifteen years after her death, she became part of Women in Baseball, a permanent display at the Baseball Hall of Fame and Museum at Cooperstown, New York, which was unveiled in 1988 to honor the entire All-American Girls Professional Baseball League. The Alva Jo Fischer Softball Complex in San Antonio was named after her in 1975. The San Antonio Sports Hall of Fame added her in 1998, and the Texas Baseball Hall of Fame followed suit in 2006.

== Career statistics ==
Pitching

GP	W	L	W-L%	ERA	IP	H	RA	ER	BB	SO	WHIP
91	34	37	.479	2.40	608	419	239	162	296	228	1.18

Batting

GP	AB	R	H	2B	3B	HR	RBI	SB	BB	SO	BA	OBP	SLG
345	1131	80	244	19	5	0	120	64	96	82	.216	.277	.241

Fielding

GP	PO	A	E	TC	DP	FA
292	569	814	117	1500	48	.922
