= Marie Kruckel =

American baseball player (1924–2012)

- Outfield / Pitcher
- Born: June 18, 1924; The Bronx, New York City, U.S.
- Died: July 21, 2012 (aged 88); South Bend, Indiana, U.S.
- Batted: Right Threw: Right
- Stats at Baseball Reference

Teams
- South Bend Blue Sox (1946, 1948[start]); Fort Wayne Daisies (1947); Muskegon Lassies (1948[end], 1949)

Career highlights and awards
- Women in Baseball – AAGPBL Permanent Display at Baseball Hall of Fame and Museum (1988)

Marie Ann Kruckel ["Kruck"] (June 18, 1924 – July 21, 2012) was an American outfielder and pitcher who played from 1946 through 1949 in the All-American Girls Professional Baseball League (AAGPBL). Listed at 5 ft 4 in (1.63 m), 130 lb (59 kg), she batted and threw right-handed.

== Life and career ==
Born in The Bronx, Marie Kruckel was one of more than a dozen players who hailed from New York City and State and made AAGPBL teams. Others included Muriel Bevis, Gloria Cordes, Mildred Deegan, Nancy Mudge, Margaret Russo, Betty Trezza and Margaret Wigiser. A willing and determined player, Kruckel began her career at outfield and later doubled as a spot starter for three teams in a span of four years.

During her grade school days, Kruckel started playing softball in the Bronx and later played organized ball on the weekends while at high school. Following her graduation, she attended East Stroudsburg State Teachers College in Pennsylvania and played for a team based in Yorktown, New York. By 1945, she wrote a letter to the league requesting information and received an invitation to the training camp. The league sent her a contract offer after she graduated.

Kruckel entered the league in 1946 with the South Bend Blue Sox, playing for them one year before joining the Fort Wayne Daisies in 1947. Because she taught school, Kruckel was unable to attend spring training and was used exclusively as a fourth outfielder during her first two seasons. Then, in 1948 she returned to the Blue Sox. They tried her as a pitcher because she showed a good command of the curveball and a strong off-speed pitch. She was traded to the Muskegon Lassies midway through the season, staying with them for one more year.

Her most productive season came in 1948, when she posted a combined 9–4 record and a 1.65 earned run average in 19 games pitched, ending sixth in the league with a .692 winning percentage. In all, she went 10–11 with a 2.11 ERA in 34 pitching appearances and batted a .248 average in 98 games.

Following her baseball career, Kruckel taught and coached during 38 years at Clay High School in South Bend, Indiana. Since her retirement she was a regular attendee at the annual AAGPBL Players Association reunions.

She is part of Women in Baseball, a permanent display based at the Baseball Hall of Fame and Museum in Cooperstown, New York, which was unveiled in 1988 to honor the entire All-American Girls Professional Baseball League.

Marie Kruckel died in 2012 in South Bend, Indiana, at the age of 88.

== Career statistics ==
Batting

GP	AB	R	H	2B	3B	HR	RBI	SB	BB	SO	BA	OBP
98	236	16	35	1	1	0	16	7	42	35	.148	.277

Pitching

GP	W	L	W-L%	ERA	IP	H	RA	ER	BB	SO	HBP	WP	WHIP
34	10	11	.476	2.11	205	165	86	48	64	27	7	6	1.12

Fielding

GP	PO	A	E	TC	DP	FA
120	82	52	5	139	3	.964
