= June Schofield =

- Shortstop / Third base
- Born: June 1, 1926; Toronto, Ontario, Canada
- Died: June 24, 2002 (aged 76); Santa Monica, California, United States
- Batted: Right Threw: Right

Teams
- Springfield Sallies (1948); Peoria Redwings (1949); Muskegon Lassies (1949)

Career highlights and awards
- Canadian Baseball Hall of Fame induction (1998)

June Rose Schofield (June 1, 1926 – June 24, 2002), nicknamed Moneybags, was a Canadian-American infielder who played in the All-American Girls Professional Baseball League (AAGPBL). She batted and threw right handed.

Born in Toronto, Ontario, June Schofield was one of the 68 players born in Canada to join the All-American Girls Professional Baseball League in its twelve years history. A slick infielder with a quick bat, she played at shortstop and third base for three teams in parts of two seasons spanning 1948–1949.

In her rookie year, Schofield was one of the few players to have a significant production for the last-place Springfield Sallies during the 1948 season, leading them with 49 runs batted in while hitting two of the three home runs batted by the team. She also posted a slash line (BA/OBP/SLG) of .236/.308/.318 and tied for fourth in the league for the most doubles (12) and triples (9). In addition, she stole 29 bases and formed a good double play combination with second sacker Evelyn Wawryshyn.

She divided her playing time with the Peoria Redwings and the Muskegon Lassies in the 1949 season, collecting a .228 average in 109 games and taking a postseason berth with Muskegon. She batted .182 (4-for-22) with two runs and one RBI in five playoff games.

She became a naturalized U.S. citizen in 1957.

In 1998, Schofield gained honorary induction into the Canadian Baseball Hall of Fame. She is also part of the AAGPBL permanent display at the Baseball Hall of Fame and Museum at Cooperstown, New York, which was unveiled in 1988 to honor the entire All-American Girls Professional Baseball League.

June Schofield was a long resident of Santa Monica, California, where she died of congestive heart failure at the age of 76.

== Career statistics ==
Batting

GP	AB	R	H	2B	3B	HR	RBI	SB	TB	BB	SO	BA	OBP	SLG
234	818	49	190	19	12	2	76	38	239	93	83	.232	.311	.292

Fielding

GP	PO	A	E	TC	DP	FA
240	643	574	113	1330	39	.915
