= Norma Metrolis =

American baseball player

Norma "Trolley" Metrolis (December 5, 1925 – February 2, 2010) was a catcher in the All-American Girls Professional Baseball League between 1946 and 1950. She both batted and threw right-handed.

Raised in Lake Worth, Florida, Norma started playing for the league at the age of 19. During the five years of her baseball career, she played for the Muskegon Lassies (1946), Racine Belles (1947), South Bend Blue Sox (1948, 1949), Peoria Redwings (1949) and Fort Wayne Daisies (1950). In addition, she went to Havana, Cuba with the league to promote the game. When Norma played for the Lassies Trollies, she didn't play much as she was backup catcher behind Mickey Maguire.

Her family donated 323 photos to the Baseball Hall of Fame in 2009. She also appears in the Diamond Dreams exhibit on the second floor of the museum. Included in these photos were practice and game action shots, informal group shots with images of excursions from other team members, gatherings at the homes of players engaged in informal recreational activities such as swimming and boating, shots from the trip to Havana, player portraits and more. As well as photographic material, there are: 3 autographed balls, Norma's uniform patch from her time with the Blue Sox, a letter from league officials with a South Bend Blue Sox contract, league-related periodicals, newsletters, team schedules, and a Muskegon Lassies business card.

Norma Metrolis died at her home in Melbourne Beach, Florida, aged 84.

== Career statistics ==
Batting Record

Year	G	AB	R	H	2B	3B	HR	RBI	SB	BB	SO	AVG
1946	15	32	2	6	0	0	0	1	2	2	2	.188
1947	18	47	2	7	0	0	0	2	2	4	4	.149
1948	12	25	2	4	0	0	0	2	2	3	1	.160
1949	15	27	1	4	0	0	0	3	1	4	4	.148
1950	10	-	-	-	-	-	-	-	-	-	-	-

== Sources ==
- Carr, Samantha. "Giving Back". Baseball Hall of Fame.
