= Dorothy Montgomery =

American baseball player (1924–2009)

- Infield
- Born: February 6, 1924; Asheville, North Carolina, U.S.
- Died: September 17, 2009 (aged 85); Chattanooga, Tennessee, U.S.
- Batted: Left Threw: Right

Teams
- Muskegon Lassies (1946)

Dorothy Elizabeth Montgomery [״Monty״] (February 6, 1924 – September 17, 2009) was a utility infielder who played in the All-American Girls Professional Baseball League (AAGPBL). Listed at 5' 3", 110 lb., she batted left-handed and threw right-handed.

Dorothy Montgomery was cut two times from the league, but she managed to obtain a one-year contract during the 1946 season.

== Early life and schooling ==
Born in Asheville, North Carolina, Dorothy was the daughter of Clarence Thurmond Montgomery and Helen Lillian McDuffitt. She graduated from Red Bank High School in 1943 and received her Bachelor of Science degree from the University of Tennessee at Chattanooga in 1947.

== Baseball career ==
In her college years, Montgomery worked at Peerless Woolen Mills and played for its semi-professional softball team, the Wollenettes. After being spotted by a talent scout while playing for the team, she received an invitation to try out for the league in the 1945 spring training. She practiced with the Racine Belles, but they cut her before the regular season began. They sent me back home because I was a little ′green′, she explained in an interview.

Montgomery tried again in 1946 and was assigned to the Muskegon Lassies. She played at infield positions during the season, collecting a .208 batting average in 26 games.

In 1947 she left college early to attend the first AAGPBL spring training outside the United States, which was held in 1947 in Cuba at the Gran Stadium de La Habana. She was allocated to the Grand Rapids Chicks, but when the league returned to the United States she was cut. I didn't have my heart in playing ball, she admitted a long time after that.

== Work after baseball ==
After hanging up her cleats, Montgomery finished her studies and became a registered cytologist for 28 years. She taught some before going to work at hospitals, teaching at Tennessee Vocational School and Laveran High School. She also was employed with Railway Express Agency, Erlanger Hospital and Combustion Engineering as a nurse. She could not return to playing softball for five years after her AAGPBL days, then she played until she was 68 years old.

Montgomery set up a pap smear laboratory at the Welborn Clinic in Evansville, Indiana before retiring in 1992. She then moved to her parents' home at Chattanooga, Tennessee and enjoyed bowling and motorcycles. In addition, she was a member of the Women's Softball Hall of Fame and attended AAGPBL Players Association reunions.

The association was largely responsible for the opening of Women in Baseball, a permanent display based at the Baseball Hall of Fame and Museum in Cooperstown, New York, which was unveiled in 1988 to honor the entire All-American Girls Professional Baseball League.

== Death ==
Dorothy Montgomery died in Chattanooga, Tennessee at the age of 85, after a short illness. She never married and was preceded in death by her parents Clarence and Helen.

== Career statistics ==
Batting

GP	AB	R	H	2B	3B	HR	RBI	SB	TB	BB	SO	BA	OBP	SLG
26	53	5	11	0	0	0	2	3	11	7	3	.208	.300	.208

Fielding

GP	PO	A	E	TC	DP	FA
17	29	20	5	54	4	.908
