= Elizabeth Wicken =

Canadian baseball player (1927–2011)

- Outfielder
- Born: May 26, 1927; Regina, Saskatchewan, Canada
- Died: April 25, 2011 (aged 83); Vancouver, British Columbia, Canada
- Batted: Left Threw: Left

Teams
- Grand Rapids Chicks (1945–1946); Muskegon Lassies (1946)

Career highlights and awards
- Canadian Baseball Hall of Fame honorary induction (1998)

Elizabeth Ann Wicken [nee Berthiaume] (May 26, 1927 – April 25, 2011) was a Canadian outfielder who played from 1945 through 1946 in the All-American Girls Professional Baseball League (AAGPBL). Listed at 5' 2", 115 lb., Wicken batted and threw left handed.

Elizabeth was one of the 68 players born in Canada to join the All-American Girls Professional Baseball League in its twelve years history. She was born in Regina, Saskatchewan to Emillien and Edith (Evans) Berthiaume, and married her childhood sweetheart, Bill Wicken, after he left the navy at the end of World War II.

She entered the All-American Girls Professional Baseball League in 1945 with the Grand Rapids Chicks, playing for them one and a half years before joining the Muskegon Lassies in the 1946 midseason. A good defensive outfielder with a strong throwing arm, she batted a .182 batting average in 117 games and reached the playoffs with Grand Rapids in 1945. In four postseason games, she went 4-for-15 for a .267 average.

Following her baseball career, Elizabeth returned to Canada and worked as a newspaper office manager and a school secretary for many years. Her 60-year loving marriage lasted until Bill's death in 2005. They had one son, Bill Jr., and four grandchildren.

Since 1988 she is part of Women in Baseball, a permanent display based at the Baseball Hall of Fame and Museum in Cooperstown, New York, which was unveiled to honor the entire All-American Girls Professional Baseball League rather than individual baseball personalities. She also gained an honorary induction into the Canadian Baseball Hall of Fame in 1998.

Elizabeth Berthiaume Wicken died in Vancouver, British Columbia, Canada, at the age of 83 years.

== Career statistics ==
Batting

GP	AB	R	H	2B	3B	HR	RBI	SB	BB	SO	BA	OBP
117	407	32	74	12	5	0	34	26	51	47	.182	.273

Fielding

GP	PO	A	E	TC	DP	FA
117	132	17	7	156	0	.955
