= Josephine Lenard =

- Center fielder
- Born: September 2, 1921; Chicago, Illinois, U.S.
- Died: February 7, 2007 (aged 85); Chicago, Illinois, U.S.
- Batted: Right Threw: Right

debut
- 1944

Last appearance
- 1953

Teams
- Rockford Peaches (1944–1945); Muskegon Lassies (1946–1949); Peoria Redwings (1949); Kenosha Comets (1950–1951); South Bend Blue Sox (1952–1953)

Career highlights and awards
- All-Star Team (1947); Two-time Championship team (1945, 1952); Four playoff appearances (1945, 1947, 1950, 1952); Ranks ninth on the career RBI list; Women in Baseball – AAGPBL Permanent Display at Baseball Hall of Fame and Museum (1988)

Veronica Josephine Lenard (September 2, 1921 – February 7, 2007), nicknamed "Bubblegum", was an American center fielder who played from 1944 through 1953 in the All-American Girls Professional Baseball League (AAGPBL). Listed at 5' 4", 130 lb., she batted and threw right-handed.

A native of Chicago, Illinois, she grew up playing baseball with her brother and the other boys in the streets of her neighborhood. Playground ball was the next step, then into the high school league and on to a Chicago amateur girls softball team. She was in school when she learned that there was a nationwide effort to recruit women to play in a new Midwest professional softball/baseball league.

Lenard attended a AAGPBL tryout and made the grade, starting a professional career that spanned ten years. A consistent line-drive hitter who used the entire field and excelled at slap bunting for base hits, she was a skillful contact hitter with a near perfect eye for the strike zone and seldom struck out. By the time her AAGPBL career ended in 1953, Lenard had driven in 351 runs to place her ninth on the career RBI list for the league, despite hitting only one home run in just over 3400 at bats. She also collected 520 stolen bases and walked 481 times against only 234 strikeouts for a 2.06 BB/K ratio. A natural center fielder, she possessed a strong and accurate throwing arm.

Lenard entered the league in 1944 with the Rockford Peaches, playing for them two years before joining the Muskegon Lassies (1946-'49), Peoria Redwings (1949), Kenosha Comets (1950-'51) and South Bend Blue Sox (1952-'53). In her rookie season, she hit a .211 average and stole 68 bases, while leading the circuit with 10 triples. Her most productive season came in 1947, when she hit a career-high .261 with 38 RBI in 111 games and was selected for the All-Star team. She also made four trips to the playoffs with four teams, including for the championship winners in 1945 and 1952.

Following her professional baseball career, Lenard went back to school and graduated from Chicago Teachers College, and then taught health and physical education for 25 years. Besides becoming an educator and coach, she was a strong advocate for the advancement of girls and women in sports. In 1968 she was assaulted and hit in the head, suffering eye damage that left her nearly blind.

Lenard is part of the AAGPBL permanent display at the Baseball Hall of Fame and Museum at Cooperstown, New York, opened in 1988, which is dedicated to the entire league rather than any individual player.

Jo Lenard died in her hometown of Chicago, Illinois on February 7, 2007, aged 85.

== Career statistics ==
Batting

GP	AB	R	H	2B	3B	HR	RBI	SB	TB	BB	SO	BA	OBP	SLG
1000	3420	465	756	73	31	1	351	481	894	481	23	.221	.317	.261

Fielding

GP	PO	A	E	TC	DP	FA
989	1467	90	64	1621	21	.961
