= Penny O'Brian =

Canadian baseball player

- Outfield
- Born: September 16, 1919; Edmonton, Alberta, Canada
- Died: April 29, 2010 (aged 90); Vancouver, British Columbia, Canada
- Batted: Right Threw: Right

Teams
- Fort Wayne Daisies (1945)

Career highlights and awards
- Single season leader in putouts (1945); Canadian Baseball Hall of Fame Honorary Induction (1998)

Penny O'Brian [Cooke] (September 16, 1919 – April 29, 2010) was a Canadian outfielder who played in the All-American Girls Professional Baseball League (AAGPBL) during the 1945 season. Listed at 5′2″, 120 lb., O'Brian batted and threw right handed.

Born in Edmonton, Alberta, Penny O'Brian was one of the 68 players born in Canada to join the All-American Girls Professional Baseball League in its twelve years history. Her career was cut short when her husband prompted her to quit the league and concentrate on her homemaking responsibilities.

Nicknamed ״Peanuts״, O'Brian began playing softball at age 14. She started her professional career in Edmonton, and gained notoriety for her blazing speed on the bases as well as in the outfield.

She married in 1944 Earl Cooke, who was serving in the Royal Canadian Navy during World War II. While playing in Saskatoon, she was offered $65 USD a week to play in the All-American Girls Professional Baseball League, which was more than the $18 CAD she was making to drive a taxi. She accepted the offer and joined the league in 1945 with the expansion club Fort Wayne Daisies.

In just 83 games, the speedy O'Brian stole 43 bases to rank seventh in the league and led all outfielders with 236 putouts. In an interview, she claimed it was the best year of her life.

After the season, she returned home and went to raise their three children: Lucella, Robert and Georgena. Widowed in 1969, she worked as chief cleaner and dishwasher for the family business Motion Foods, retiring in 1985.

She is part of the AAGPBL permanent display at the Baseball Hall of Fame and Museum at Cooperstown, New York, unveiled in 1988, which is dedicated to the entire league rather than any individual personality. She also gained honorary induction into the Canadian Baseball Hall of Fame in 1998.

Penny O'Brian died in Vancouver at the age of 90.

== Career statistics ==
Batting

GP	AB	R	H	2B	3B	HR	RBI	SB	BB	SO	BA	OBP	SLG
83	282	34	61	0	0	1	23	43	16	46	.216	.258	.227

Fielding

GP	PO	A	E	TC	DP	FA
82	236	10	14	260	5	.946
