= Betty Petryna =

American baseball player (1930–2020)

Betty Petryna or Doreen Allen (November 26, 1930 – September 4, 2020) played in the All-American Girls Professional Baseball League (AAGPBL). She both threw and batted right-handed.

== Professional baseball career ==
Betty was described as "a rock-solid player at third base." She had never even played that position, but was told by the teacher in the first game that she had to play in third base. After that she said she wanted second as it was a closer throw but was told she had to be third as she was "good and could throw the ball to first." She played for the Fort Wayne Daisies (1949) and Grand Rapids Chicks (1948). In her first year she earned $75 a week and in her second, $125.

Betty also got an AAGPBL all-time record of 12 assists in one game. She made a solid contribution to her team in its 1948 win of the Eastern Division Championship.

Born in Regina, Saskatchewan, Canada, Betty retired from playing professional baseball in 1950 to spend more time with her family and husband.

== Career statistics ==
Seasonal batting record

| Year | G | AB | R | H | 2B | 3B | HR | RBI | SB | BB | SO | AVG |
|---|---|---|---|---|---|---|---|---|---|---|---|---|
| 1948 | 25 | 61 | 6 | 7 | 0 | 0 | 0 | 2 | 2 | 7 | 8 | .115 |
| 1949 | 97 | 300 | 15 | 43 | 4 | 0 | 0 | 18 | 10 | 29 | 34 | .143 |
