= Charlene Pryer =

American baseball player

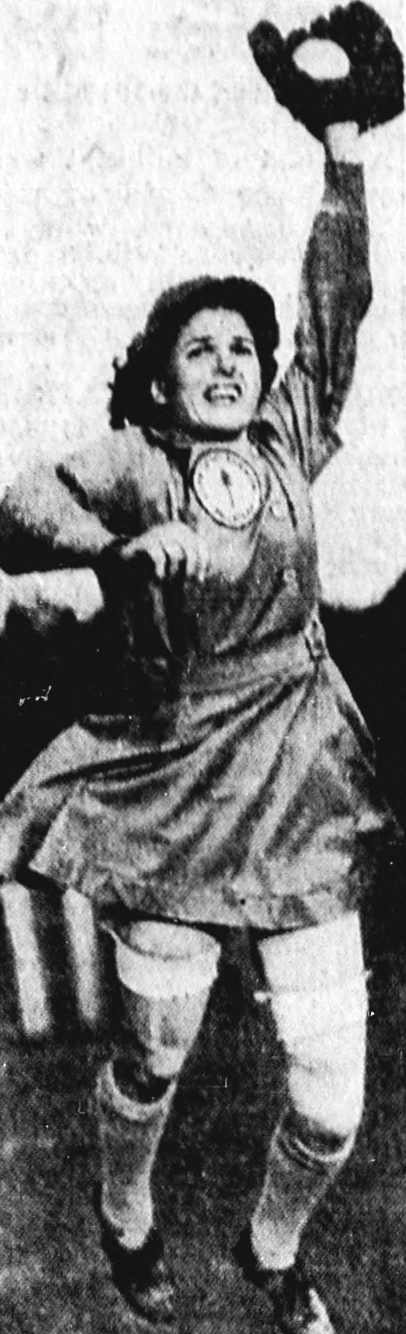
- Center field / Second base
- Born: September 24, 1921; Watsonville, California, U.S.
- Died: June 3, 1999 (aged 77); Medford, Oregon, U.S.
- Batted: Right Threw: Right

Career statistics
- Batting average: .255
- Runs batted in: 152
- Stolen bases: 510

Teams
- Muskegon Lassies (1946–1950); Kalamazoo Lassies (1950); South Bend Blue Sox (1950–1952)

Career highlights and awards
- All-Star Team (1951); Single-season leader in stolen bases (1951–1952) hits (1951) runs scored (1951); Two Championship Teams (1951–1952)

Charlene Barbara Pryer [Mayer] (September 24, 1921 – June 3, 1999) was an American utility player in the All-American Girls Professional Baseball League, playing mainly at second base and center field from 1946 through 1952. Listed at 5 ft 1 in (1.55 m), 105 lb., Pryer batted and threw right-handed. She was nicknamed "Shorty" amongst her friends and family members because of her slight build and minuscule stature.

Charlene Pryer is recognized as one of the fastest baserunners of the All-American Girls Professional Baseball League in its twelve years of existence. An All-Star at second base, she also led all outfielders in fielding percentage in a single season and topped the circuit in stolen bases for two consecutive years. In a career that spanned seven seasons, she was a member of two championship teams while hitting a .255 average with 510 stolen bases in 704 games, including single-season leads in hits and in runs scored.

== Early life ==
A native of Watsonville, California, Pryer was the daughter of Willard 'Maurice' Pryer, a minor league pitcher who played in the early 1940s for the Fargo-Moorhead Twins of the Northern League. Her father and his brothers were known for their baseball playing skills in Fortuna, California. Besides teaching her basic baseball fundamentals, Pryer's father also taught her that hard work and determination were key to success. Following her school graduation, Pryer joined the United States Marine Corps Women's Reserve in 1944, entertaining troops as a singer with the Dick Jurgens Orchestra. Notably, she also was one of the first female disc jockeys in the United States. After serving in the military for 28 months she became a ballplayer in the All-American Girls Professional Baseball League.

== AAGPBL career ==
Pryer entered the league in 1946 with the expansion Muskegon Lassies, playing for them through the 1950 midseason before joining the Kalamazoo Lassies (1950) and South Bend Blue Sox (1950–1952). In her rookie season, she hit .202 in 108 games, including 77 hits and 18 runs batted in while scoring 64 times. Considering the AAGPBL was using underhand pitching and a ball with a 11-inch circumference, her numbers were quite respectable. In 1947 Pryer improved to .249 (105-for-422) in 108 games, scoring 51 runs while driving in 20 more. In addition, she was voted the best outfielder in the league with a fielding average of .995.

Pryer increased her numbers in 1948, when the league switched to overhand pitching. She raised her average to a solid .262 (107-for-406), scoring 70 runs with 29 RBI in 112 games, but missed most of the 1949 season after suffering a severely broken ankle while sliding on a base. At the time of her injury, she was batting .235 with 56 runs and 10 RBI in 76 game appearances.

In 1950 Pryer returned to the Lassies. She started the year in Muskegon, moved with the team to Kalamazoo during the midseason, and landed in South Bend late in the year. But she was still finding ways to improve her game, regardless of moving to different towns, bolstering her average to .269 (115-for-497) with 75 runs and 25 RBI, while matching her season-high of 112 games.

Pryer had her most productive season in 1951, when she posted career-numbers with a .312 average, 133 hits, 106 runs, 32 RBI and 129 stolen bases in 109 games, leading the league in hits, runs and steals, while ranking seventh to Betty Foss of the Fort Wayne Daisies, who won the batting crown with a .368 average. Pryer capped her big season with an All-Star Team selection and a championship title with the Blue Sox. With Karl Winsch at the helm, South Bend combined strong pitching with good hitting, collecting a 76–36 record in the regular season, then defeating Fort Wayne in the first round of the playoffs, two to one games. In the best-of-five series, South Bench clinched the title over the Rockford Peaches after overcoming a 2–0 deficit.

Winsch, after a positive season, became more demanding of his players. Dissension within the South Bend team peaked just before the 1952 season ended, when Pryer was disciplined following a dispute with Winsch. The incident occurred when he suspended Pryer from the team after she responded slowly to his order to pinch-run late in a game. In protest, five South Bend teammates joined Pryer in a walkout, leaving Winsch's team short-handed for the playoffs. Pryer was reinstated at the club, but she decided to retire for good. That season she stole a league-high 59 bases, despite appearing in only 79 games. She added a .239 average and drove in 18 runs while scoring 41 times.

== Life after baseball ==
Following her baseball retirement, Pryer married Jack Stuart Mayer, who died in 1993. The couple had a daughter, a son and three granddaughters. A longtime resident of Medford, Oregon, she worked as a school truant officer and playground assistant for Medford School District 549C for more than 25 years, retiring in 1994. As a campus monitor and attendance investigative officer, she also worked at recesses, becoming a forward on the basketball court, a running back on the gridiron, or reprising her role as player on the baseball field by coaxing speedy runs, strong swings and artful catches from hundreds of students. She also managed to referee, coach and make sure everyone minded their manners. Besides her passion for music and sports, she served as a Rogue Valley Medical Center auxiliary volunteer and was a member of the Christ Unity Church in Medford.

Charlene died in her home of Medford at the age of 77. In October 1999, four months after her death, the Wilson Elementary School officially dedicated its baseball field in her honor. She also is part of the AAGPBL permanent display inaugurated at the Baseball Hall of Fame and Museum at Cooperstown, New York in 1988.
