= Buzz Boyle =

American baseball player (1908-1978)

- Outfielder
- Born: February 9, 1908; Cincinnati, Ohio, U.S.
- Died: November 12, 1978 (aged 70); Cincinnati, Ohio, U.S.
- Batted: Left Threw: Left

MLB debut
- September 11, 1929, for the Boston Braves

Last MLB appearance
- September 29, 1935, for the Brooklyn Dodgers

MLB statistics
- Batting average: .290
- Home runs: 12
- Runs batted in: 125
- Stats at Baseball Reference

Teams
- Boston Braves (1929–1930); Brooklyn Dodgers (1933–1935)

Ralph Francis "Buzz" Boyle (February 9, 1908 – November 12, 1978) was an American professional baseball player who played as an outfielder in Major League Baseball from 1929 through 1935. He played for the Boston Braves and Brooklyn Dodgers. In 1934, his most productive year in the majors, Boyle hit .305 for the Dodgers, led the major leagues with 20 outfield assists, and received National League MVP votes. Listed at 5 ft 11 in (1.80 m), 170 lb., Boyle batted and threw left-handed. Born in Cincinnati, he attended Xavier University.

In 366 games over five seasons, Boyle posted a .290 batting average (389-for-1343) with 185 runs, 58 doubles, 24 triples, 12 home runs, 125 RBI, 24 stolen bases, 116 bases on balls, .347 on-base percentage and .395 slugging percentage. He finished his career with a .970 fielding percentage playing at all three outfield positions.

Boyle also managed for the Muskegon Lassies of the All-American Girls Professional Baseball League in its 1946 season. Noted sports columnist Steve Rushin is his great-nephew.

Boyle died in 1978 at his hometown of Cincinnati at the age of 70.
