= Evelyn Wawryshyn =

Canadian baseball player (1924–2022)

- Second base
- Born: November 11, 1924; Tyndall, Manitoba, Canada
- Died: February 3, 2022 (aged 97)
- Batted: Right Threw: Right

Teams
- Kenosha Comets (1946); Muskegon Lassies (1946–1947); Springfield Sallies (1948); Fort Wayne Daisies (1949–1951)

Career highlights and awards
- All-Star Team (1950); Four playoff appearances (1947, 1949–51); Ranks 13th all-time in batting average; Inductions: Manitoba Sports Hall of Fame (1992); Canadian Baseball Hall of Fame (1998); Manitoba Softball Hall of Fame (1998)

Evelyn Wawryshyn [Litwin/Moroz] (November 11, 1924 – February 3, 2022) was a Canadian second base who played from 1946 through 1951 in the All-American Girls Professional Baseball League (AAGPBL). Listed at 5' 3", 130 lb., Wawryshyn batted and threw right-handed. She was nicknamed Evie by her friends and teammates.

Wawryshyn played second base, taking the field for four different teams of the All-American Girls Professional Baseball League in a span of six years. She posted a career .266 batting average in 544 games. Despite hitting only one home run in 1943 at bats, she contributed with 463 singles, 37 doubles and 16 triples to collect a .303 of slugging. She also brought her Player of the Year honourable mention status in 1948 as well as steadily improving All-Star recognition, joining the third All-League team in 1948, the second team in 1949, and a first selection for the All-Star Game at second base in the 1950 season. In addition, her .266 average ranks her thirteen on the AAGPBL career batting list.

== Career ==
=== 1940s ===
The All-American Girls Professional Baseball League was a circuit that began to operate in the early 1940s in cities located on or near Lake Michigan. The main promoter was Philip K. Wrigley, owner of the Chicago Cubs, who worried about the viability of Major League Baseball players during World War II decided to establish an alternate attraction. Since the only organized ball for women in the country was softball, the league officials created a hybrid game that included both fast-pitch softball and baseball. Wrigley had scouts all over the United States, Canada and even Cuba signing girls for tryouts. The circuit was initially called the All-American Girls Softball League, though early in the first season the name was changed to All American Girls Baseball League. In its twelve years of history the AAGPBL evolved through many stages progressing far enough to become a regulation baseball game. These differences varied from the beginning of the league in 1943, progressively extending the length of the base paths and pitching distance and decreasing the size of the ball until the final season of play in 1954.

A native of Tyndall, Manitoba, Wawryshyn was the only girl in a home of four children. Archie, the older brother, always let her play ball with him. "I believe he is responsible for implanting the love for this pastime", she recalled in her autobiography. But like most athletes, Wawryshyn excelled in more than one sport. She dabbled in ice hockey, was North-Eastern Manitoba Senior Girls' track and field champion in 1940, and played fastball pitch in Winnipeg for the CUAC Blues (Canadian Ukrainian Athletic Club), provincial champion team in 1945, to become the Blues Most Valuable Player and win the Koman Trophy. She also was a member of the Provincial Senior Ladies' Championship basketball team in Flin Flon in 1946, but in reality her real passion was baseball. Her dreams came true when she was discovered by an AAGPBL scout who invited her to a tryout camp at Wrigley Field in Chicago. She passed the test and was rewarded with a contract to play in the league.

Wawryshyn moved around for a while in a brief period of six years, as the AAGPBL shifted players as needed to help teams stay afloat. She entered the league in 1946 with the Kenosha Comets, playing for them part of the season before joining the Muskegon Lassies (1946–47), Springfield Sallies (1948) and Fort Wayne Daisies (1949–51). "My favorite manager was Carson Bigbee (Muskegon and Springfield), who gave me the chance to play each and every game", Wawryshyn said. She added, "Later, Max Carey was instrumental in my final year with the Fort Wayne Daisies". In her rookie season, Wawryshyn appeared in a combined 73 games between Kenosha and Muskegon, hitting .217 and driving in 18 runs while scoring 29 times.

In April 1947 all of the league's players were flown to Havana, Cuba, for spring training. Wawryshyn saw little action with the Lassies that year, but still managed to increase her average to .237 in just 36 games.

In 1948 Wawryshyn was dealt to the Springfield Sallies in an effort to bolster the new team. The Sallies finished as the worst team in the league, however, getting roughed up as a last-place expansion club with a 41–84 record, ending 35 and a half games behind the Racine Belles in the Western Division, and had no All-Stars in their roster. The only regular to have a significant year for them was Wawryshyn, who tied for sixth place in the league with a .266 batting average in a career-high 114 games, while ranking among the top ten hitters with 114 hits, 66 stolen bases and 126 total bases. The pitching staff was led by the durable Doris Barr, who posted a decent 2.68 ERA with a career-high 116 strikeouts despite her 7–19 record. The Sallies folded at the end of the season.

Wawryshyn moved to Fort Wayne in 1949, as part of a team accustomed to the spotlight. The strong Daisies counted with the sister duet of Betty Foss and Joanne Weaver, who combined to win five consecutive batting championships, as well as the slugger Wilma Briggs, infielders Mildred Deegan and Dorothy Schroeder, while the pitching stars were Dorothy Collins and Maxine Kline.

=== 1950s ===
Wawryshyn hit .251 in her first season for the Daisies, including 47 runs and 34 RBI in 109 games. Her most productive season came in 1950, when she posted a career-high .311 average in 104 games and was selected for the All-Star Team. She also smashed 124 hits in 399 at-bats and scored 71 times, all career-highs, while driving in 50 runs. In 1951, during what turned out to be her final season, she hit a .277 with a career-high 54 RBI and 60 runs scored in 104 games. While the Daisies made the playoffs in their 1945 debut and from 1948 through 1954, they struggled in the post-season and never won a championship title.

Wawryshyn usually played ice hockey during the baseball off-season. Her highlights include being the top scorer on the Senior Women's hockey team of Winnipeg that won both Western and Eastern Canadian finals in 1950. She also worked as a teacher in the off-season, and eventually missed spring training. She married in 1951 and has been a member of the AAGPBL Players Association since its inception in 1982.

Wawryshyn and another 63 girls who represented Canada in the AAGPBL form part of the permanent display at the Baseball Hall of Fame and Museum at Cooperstown, New York, inaugurated in 1988, which is dedicated to the entire league rather than any individual player. She also gained inductions into the Manitoba Sports Hall of Fame (1992), the Canadian Baseball Hall of Fame and Museum (1998), and the Manitoba Softball Hall of Fame (1998). In 2009, it was noted that Wawryshyn was retired and living in Winnipeg, Canada. She died on February 3, 2022, at the age of 97.

== Personal life ==
In 1951 she married John Litwin with whom she had two children. Her first husband died of a heart attack in 1954, ten days after the birth of the second child. In 1960 she married school principal Henry Moroz with whom she had four more children. She worked for the parks and recreation department of the city of Winnipeg. Her second husband died in 2008 and she died on 3 February 2022 at age 97, leaving her six children, eleven grandchildren and seven great-grandchildren.

== Batting statistics ==
GP	AB	R	H	2B	3B	HR	RBI	BA	SLG
544	1943	275	517	37	16	1	193	.266	.303
