= Carson Bigbee =

American baseball player (1895–1964)

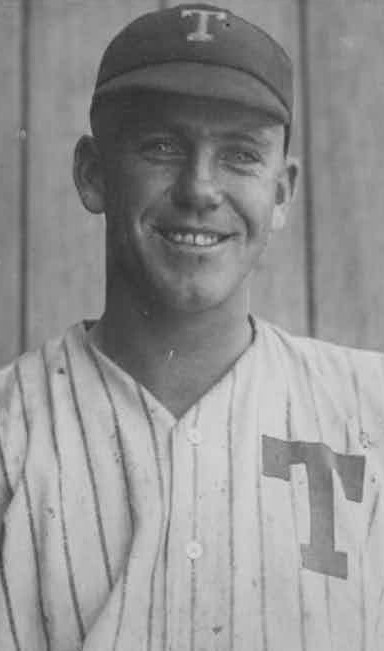
- Left fielder
- Born: March 31, 1895; Lebanon, Oregon, U.S.
- Died: October 17, 1964 (aged 69); Portland, Oregon, U.S.
- Batted: Left Threw: Right

MLB debut
- August 25, 1916, for the Pittsburgh Pirates

Last MLB appearance
- August 4, 1926, for the Pittsburgh Pirates

MLB statistics
- Batting average: .287
- Home runs: 17
- Runs batted in: 324
- Stats at Baseball Reference

Teams
- Pittsburgh Pirates (1916–1926)

Career highlights and awards
- World Series champion (1925)

Carson Lee "Skeeter" Bigbee (March 31, 1895 – October 17, 1964) was an American outfielder in Major League Baseball who played his entire career with the Pittsburgh Pirates. He was born in Lebanon, Oregon, and attended the University of Oregon.

Bigbee's brother Lyle also played Major League Baseball.

Bigbee led the National League in singles in 1921 and 1922.

In 1147 games over 11 seasons, Bigbee batted .287 (1205-for-4192) with 629 runs scored, 17 home runs and 324 RBI.

In 1926, Bigbee was released along with Pirates pitcher Babe Adams after supporting the removal of meddlesome former manager and part-owner Fred Clarke from the team's dugout.

After his playing career ended, he coached the Muskegon Lassies and Springfield Sallies of the All-American Girls Professional Baseball League.

Bigbee died at the age of 69 in Portland, Oregon. He was interred at the Willamette National Cemetery in Portland.

== See also ==
- List of Major League Baseball single-game hits leaders
- List of Major League Baseball players who spent their entire career with one franchise
