= Dorothy Stolze =

- Infielder; Outfielder
- Born: May 1, 1923; Alameda, California, U.S.
- Died: July 19, 2003 (aged 80); Alameda, California, U.S.
- Batted: Right Threw: Right

debut
- 1946, for the Muskegon Lassies

Last appearance
- 1952, for the Grand Rapids Chicks

Career statistics
- Batting average: .247
- Home runs: 5
- Runs batted in: 319
- On-base percentage: .339

Teams
- Muskegon Lassies (1946–'49); Racine Belles (1949); Peoria Redwings (1950–'51); Grand Rapids Chicks (1952)

Dorothy Stolze [Dottie] (May 1, 1923 – July 19, 2003) was a second basewoman who played from 1946 through 1952 for four teams of the All-American Girls Professional Baseball League (AAGPBL). Listed at 5 ft 4 in (1.63 m), 129 lb., she batted and threw right-handed.

== Career ==
A native of Alameda, California, Stolze has been considered by many baseball historians as one of the most versatile utility players in AAGPBL history. Basically a middle infielder, she is reported to have played every position with the exception of pitcher at one time or another of her career.

Stolze was discovered by former big leaguer Max Carey, while she was playing in a fastpitch softball league in Alameda. She entered the league in 1946 with the Muskegon Lassies, playing for them until the 1949 midseason before joining the Racine Belles (1949), Peoria Redwings (1950–1951) and Grand Rapids Chicks (1952). She started as the Lassies shortstop as soon as she arrived, and distinguished herself in her debut by hitting a triple. She hit .194 in 81 games with a career-high 34 runs batted in and also made a flashy unassisted double play in her rookie season.

Hampered by an elbow injury incurred in a car accident, Stolze started having trouble making the long throws from shortstop, and was moved to second base in 1947. Her most productive season came in 1948, when she posted career-numbers in games played (121), hits (113), runs (62) and stolen bases (67), while hitting a .242 average. She enjoyed another fine season with the 1950 Redwings, batting a career-high .243 with 101 hits and 32 RBI.

In a seven-season career, Stolze was a .247 hitter and posted a collective fielding average of .963 with an excellent walk-to-strikeout ratio of 1.94 (367-to-189).

Following her playing retirement in 1952, Stolze returned to college to get her degree and became a physical education teacher and girls' softball coach until she retired in 1991. She remained a sports fan throughout her life and regularly attended the Athletics and Raiders games in the Bay Area.

Stolze is a member of the National Baseball Hall of Fame and Museum since 1988, when the entire All-American Girls Professional Baseball League were inducted into this venerable building rather than any individual player. She died in her homeland of Alameda at the age of 80.

== Statistics ==
=== Batting ===
GP	AB	R	H	2B	3B	HR	RBI	SB	BB	SO	BA	OBP
774	2636	319	651	88	15	5	312	216	367	189	.247	.339

=== Fielding ===
PO	A	E	TC	DP	FA
1289	119	55	1463	25	.963

== Sources ==
- Encyclopedia of women and baseball - Leslie A. Heaphy, Mel Anthony May. Publisher: McFarland & Co., 2006. Format: Paperback, 438 pp. Language: English. ISBN 0-7864-2100-2 ISBN 978-0-7864-2100-8
- The Women of the All-American Girls Professional Baseball League: A biographical dictionary - W. C. Madden. Publisher: McFarland & Co., 1997. Format: Paperback, 295 pp. Language: English. ISBN 0-7864-0304-7 ISBN 978-0-7864-0304-2
