= 1945 All-American Girls Professional Baseball League season =

- League: All-American Girls Professional Baseball League
- Sport: Baseball
- Games: 110
- Teams: 6

Regular season
- Season champions: Rockford Peaches
- Season MVP: Connie Wisniewski (GR)

Shaugnessy playoffs
- Champions: Rockford Peaches

AAGPBL seasons
- 1944 1946

The 1945 All-American Girls Professional Baseball League season marked the third season of the circuit. The action began with six teams, like the previous season. But the Milwaukee Chicks and the Minneapolis Millerettes franchises were renamed the Grand Rapids Chicks and Fort Wayne Daisies respectively. The measure took effect for poor attendances in the cities of these teams the year before. At this point, the new clubs joined the Kenosha Comets, Racine Belles, Rockford Peaches and South Bend Blue Sox, all founding members of the league. The six teams competed through a 110-game schedule, while the split season was dropped in favor of a longer playoff format with the Shaugnessy format: the one seed facing the three seed and the two seed against the four seed. In addition, the pitching distance increased from 40 to 42 feet during the midseason.

Nevertheless, the pitchers continued to dominate the league as an all-time record eight no-hitters were recorded in the season. Rockford's Carolyn Morris hurled a perfect game against Fort Wayne, while South Bend's Betty Luna threw four shutouts in a stretch, including her first career no-hitter. Grand Rapids' Connie Wisniewski led all pitchers with her 32 victories and a 0.81 earned run average, rivaled with Fort Wayne's Dorothy Wiltse who recorded 29 wins and a 0.83 ERA. But on the other side, Mary Nesbitt of Racine was the only hitter to top the .300 mark (.319) while Fort Wayne teammates Helen Callaghan and Faye Dancer tied for the home run title with three each. Wisniewski was honored with the AAGPBL Player of the Year Award.

In the playoffs, champion Rockford played third place Grand Rapids and second place Fort Wayne took Racine. Rockford and Fort Wayne ended up facing each other in the finals, with Rockford becoming the first team to win both the season title and the championship in league history. Morris, who went 28–12 with a 1.08 ERA in the season, defeated the Chicks three times in the first round and repeated her feat against the Daisies in the finals, proving that good pitching was more important than hitting during a short series.

The AAGPBL drew 450,000 fans during the 1945 season, which represented a 19 percent increase over the previous year.

== Teams ==
1945 All-American Girls Professional Baseball League Teams
Team	City	Stadium
Fort Wayne Daisies	Fort Wayne, Indiana	North Side High School
Grand Rapids Chicks	Grand Rapids, Michigan	South High School Field
Kenosha Comets	Kenosha, Wisconsin	Lake Front Stadium
Racine Belles	Racine, Wisconsin	Horlick Field
Rockford Peaches	Rockford, Illinois	Rockford Municipal Stadium
South Bend Blue Sox	South Bend, Indiana	Bendix Field

== Map of teams ==
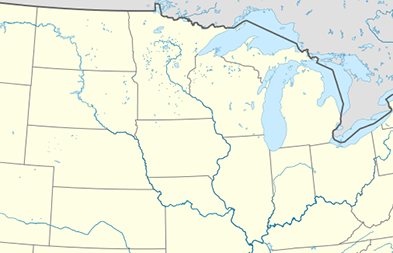
All-American Girls Professional Baseball League teams

== Final standings ==
Rank	Team	W	L	W-L%	GB
1	Rockford Peaches	67	43	.609	–
2	Fort Wayne Daisies	62	47	.569	4½
3	Grand Rapids Chicks	60	50	.545	7
4	Racine Belles	50	60	.455	17
5	South Bend Blue Sox	49	60	.450	17½
6	Kenosha Comets	41	69	.372	26

== Postseason ==
First round Best of five series
1	Rockford Peaches	3
3	Grand Rapids Chicks	1
2	Fort Wayne Daisies	3
4	Racine Belles	1

Second round Best of seven series
1	Rockford Peaches	4
2	Fort Wayne Daisies	1

== Batting statistics ==
Statistic	Player	Record
Batting average	Mary Nesbitt (RAC); Helen Callaghan (FW); Dorothy Kamenshek (ROC); Margaret Wigiser (ROC); Elizabeth Mahon (SB); Thelma Eisen (GR); Dorothy Harrell (ROC); Sophie Kurys (RAC); Kay Rohrer (ROC); Betsy Jochum (SB)	.319.299.274.249.246.240.239.239.239.237
Runs scored	Dorothy Kamenshek (ROC); Helen Callaghan (FW); Sophie Kurys (RAC); Mary Baker (SB); Edythe Perlick (RAC); Mildred Deegan (ROC); Faye Dancer (FW); Thelma Eisen (GR); Helen Filarski (ROC)	80; 77; 73; 49; 47; 47; 44; 44; 44
Hits	Helen Callaghan (FW); Dorothy Kamenshek (ROC); Phyllis Koehn (KEN/SB); Thelma Eisen (GR); Mary Baker (SB); Betsy Jochum (SB); Sophie Kurys (RAC); Edythe Perlick (RAC); Vivian Kellogg (FW)	122; 115; 95; 94; 93; 92; 83; 83; 82
Doubles	Helen Callaghan (FW); Thelma Eisen (GR); Margaret Stefani (SB); Dorothy Kamenshek (ROC); Vivian Kellogg (FW); Mildred Deegan (ROC); Doris Tetzlaff (GR); Margaret Wigiser (ROC); Kay Rohrer (ROC); Lee Surkowski (SB); Rose Gacioch (ROC)	17; 16; 13; 11; 10; 9; 9; 8; 8; 8; 8
Triples	Audrey Wagner (KEN); Gertrude Ganote (SB); Margaret Stefani (SB); Edythe Perlick (RAC); Vivian Kellogg (FW); Lois Florreich (SB/KEN); Mary Baker (SB); Mildred Deegan (ROC); Lee Surkowski (SB); Helen Callaghan (FW); Phyllis Koehn (KEN/SB)	9; 8; 8; 7; 6; 6; 5; 5; 4; 3; 3
Home runs	Helen Callaghan (FW); Faye Dancer (FW); Dorothy Harrell (ROC); Edythe Perlick (RAC); Kay Rohrer (ROC); Dorothy Schroeder (SB/KEN); Audrey Wagner (KEN); Margaret Wigiser (ROC)	3; 3; 2; 2; 2; 2; 2; 2
Runs batted in	Rose Gacioch (ROC); Phyllis Koehn (KEN/SB); Edythe Perlick (RAC); Margaret Stefani (SB); Lavonne Paire (FW); Vivian Kellogg (FW); Eleanor Dapkus (RAC); Betsy Jochum (SB); Margaret Wigiser (ROC); Thelma Eisen (GR); Ruth Lessing (FW)	44; 43; 41; 39; 39; 38; 37; 36; 35; 34; 31
Stolen bases	Sophie Kurys (RAC); Helen Callaghan (FW); Dorothy Kamenshek (ROC); Shirley Jameson (KEN); Twila Shively (GR); Edythe Perlick (RAC); Penny O'Brian (FW); Thelma Eisen (GR); Elizabeth Fabac (KEN)	115; 92; 60; 58; 46; 44; 43; 41; 41
Total bases	Helen Callaghan (FW); Dorothy Kamenshek (ROC); Thelma Eisen (GR); Betsy Jochum (SB); Margaret Stefani (SB); Mary Baker (SB); Phyllis Koehn (KEN/SB); Vivian Kellogg (FW); Edythe Perlick (RAC)	156; 130; 115; 110; 110; 109; 109; 107; 107

== Pitching statistics ==
Statistic	Player	Record
Wins	Connie Wisniewski (GR); Dorothy Wiltse (FW); Carolyn Morris (ROC); Helen Nicol (KEN); Olive Little (ROC); Doris Barr (SB/RAC); Charlotte Armstrong (SB); Audrey Haine (FW); Josephine Kabick (FW); Mary Nesbitt (RAC); Elise Harney (KEN); Betty Luna (SB)	32; 29; 28; 24; 22; 20; 18; 16; 16; 16; 14; 14
Earned run average	Connie Wisniewski (GR); Dorothy Wiltse (FW); Carolyn Morris (ROC); Helen Nicol (KEN); Betty Luna (SB); Annabelle Lee (FW); Olive Little (ROC); Doris Barr (SB/RAC); Josephine Kabick (FW); Mary Nesbitt (RAC)	0.81; 0.83; 1.08; 1.34; 1.53; 1.56; 1.68; 1.71; 1.85; 1.87
Strikeouts	Dorothy Wiltse (GR); Helen Nicol (KEN); Olive Little (ROC); Nalda Bird (SB); Carolyn Morris (ROC); Doris Barr (SB/RAC); Amy Applegren (ROC)	293; 220; 142; 128; 119; 104; 101
Games pitched	Charlotte Armstrong (SB); Helen Nicol (KEN); Dorothy Wiltse (GR); Connie Wisniewski (GR); Elise Harney (KEN); Carolyn Morris (ROC); Josephine Kabick (GR); Olive Little (ROC); Viola Thompson (GR); Joanne Winter (RAC); Audrey Haine (FW); Annabelle Lee (FW)	46; 46; 46; 46; 43; 42; 35; 34; 34; 34; 32; 31
Innings pitched	Connie Wisniewski (GR); Helen Nicol (KEN); Charlotte Armstrong (SB); Dorothy Wiltse (GR); Carolyn Morris (ROC); Elise Harney (KEN); Olive Little (ROC); Josephine Kabick (GR); Mary Nesbitt (RAC); Viola Thompson (GR); Joanne Winter (RAC); Doris Barr (SB/RAC)	391; 357; 355; 345; 333; 301; 295; 292; 284; 260; 260; 256

== See also ==
- 1945 Major League Baseball season
