= 1949 All-American Girls Professional Baseball League season =

- League: All-American Girls Professional Baseball League
- Sport: Baseball
- Teams: Eight

Regular season
- Season champions: Rockford Peaches; South Bend Blue Sox (Tied for first place)

Shaugnessy playoffs
- Champions: Rockford Peaches

AAGPBL seasons
- 1948 1950

The 1949 All-American Girls Professional Baseball League season marked the seventh season of the circuit. With the Chicago Colleens and Springfield Sallies turning into rookie development teams after the 1948 season, the AAGPBL was left with eight squads: the Kenosha Comets, Fort Wayne Daisies, Grand Rapids Chicks, Muskegon Lassies, Peoria Redwings, Racine Belles, Rockford Peaches and South Bend Blue Sox. The teams competed through a 112-game schedule.

This time the league adopted a smaller ball during the midseason, going from 10 3/8 inches (260 mm) to 10 inches (250 mm), while the pitching distance increased 50 feet to 55 feet. The transition toward traditional baseball increased significantly. As a result, some talented pitchers jumped up to the rival Chicago National League when they could not adapt to the overhand delivery adopted the previous season. Pitching still outweighed hitting in the league, as no hitter could top the .300 average mark for the year. Rockford's Lois Florreich collected a 0.67 earned run average and South Bend's Jean Faut had a .909 winning percentage, both all-time single season records, while South Bend's Lillian Faralla hurled two no-hitters and Faut added another one for the team.

The greatest highlight of the season came from Muskegon's pitcher/outfielder Doris Sams, who won the batting crown with a .279 average and posted a 15–10 record with a 1.58 ERA, to become the first player in league history to win two Player of the Year Awards. She obtained her first distinction in the 1947 season.

The South Bend team finished tied in first place along with Rockford. In the first round of the Shaughnessy playoffs, third place Grand Rapids and sixth place Muskegon won their respective best-of-three series against fifth place Fort Wayne and fourth place Kenosha. In the second round, Rockford defeated South Bend in a best-of-seven series and Rockford won over Grand Rapids in a best-of-five series to determine the championship, which was won by Rockford in the final best-of-five series.

The AAGPBL peaked in attendance during the 1947 and 1948 seasons, when the teams attracted almost a million paid fans for consecutive year. But for the first time, the league failed to reach the attendance desired since its foundation in 1943.

== Teams ==
1949 All-American Girls Professional Baseball League Teams
Team	City	Stadium
Fort Wayne Daisies	Fort Wayne, Indiana	Memorial Park
Grand Rapids Chicks	Grand Rapids, Michigan	South High School Field
Kenosha Comets	Kenosha, Wisconsin	Simmons Field
Muskegon Lassies	Muskegon, Michigan	Marsh Field
Peoria Redwings	Peoria, Illinois	Peoria Stadium
Racine Belles	Racine, Wisconsin	Horlick Field
Rockford Peaches	Rockford, Illinois	Beyer Stadium
South Bend Blue Sox	South Bend, Indiana	Playland Park

== Map of teams ==
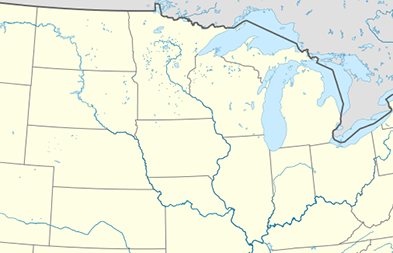
All-American Girls Professional Baseball League teams

== Standings ==
Rank	Team	W	L	W-L%	GB
1	South Bend Blue Sox	75	36	.676	—
2	Rockford Peaches	75	36	.676	—
3	Grand Rapids Chicks	57	54	.514	18
4	Kenosha Comets	58	55	.505	19
5	Fort Wayne Daisies	52	57	.477	23
6	Muskegon Lassies	46	66	.411	29 1/2
7	Racine Belles	45	65	.409	29 1/2
8	Peoria Redwings	36	73	.330	39

== Postseason ==
First round Best of three series
4	Kenosha Comets	1
6	Muskegon Lassies	3
3	Grand Rapids Chicks	3
5	Fort Wayne Daisies	1

Second round a - Best of seven series b - Best of five series
1	South Bend Blue Sox	0
2	Rockford Peaches	4
6	Muskegon Lassies	0
3	Grand Rapids Chicks	3

Third round Best of five series
2	Rockford Peaches	3
3	Grand Rapids Chicks	1

== Batting statistics ==
Statistic	Player	Record
Batting average	Doris Sams (MUS); Connie Wisniewski (GR); Doris Satterfield (GR); Inez Voyce (GR); Dorothy Kamenshek (ROC); Edythe Perlick (RAC); Evelyn Wawryshyn (FW); Helen Candaele (KEN); Vivian Kellogg (FW); Sophie Kurys (RAC)	.279.278.259.257.255.255.251.251.247.245
Runs scored	Sophie Kurys (RAC); Connie Wisniewski (GR); Dorothy Kamenshek (ROC); Elizabeth Mahon (SB); Senaida Wirth (SB); Thelma Eisen (FW); Ernestine Petras (KEN); Mary Baker (SB); Betty Wagoner (SB); Alma Ziegler (GR)	70; 64; 62; 62; 62; 59; 59; 58; 58; 58
Hits	Doris Sams (MUS); Connie Wisniewski (GR); Doris Satterfield (GR); Sophie Kurys (RAC); Dorothy Kamenshek (ROC); Vivian Kellogg (FW); Evelyn Wawryshyn (FW); Elizabeth Mahon (SB); Inez Voyce (GR); Dorothy Harrell (ROC)	114; 113; 109; 102; 98; 98; 98; 97; 96; 95
Doubles	Doris Satterfield (GR); Elizabeth Mahon (SB); Connie Wisniewski (GR); Marilyn Olinger (GR); Vivian Kellogg (SB); Helen Candaele (KEN); Dorothy Kamenshek (ROC); Rita Meyer (PEO); Mary Reynolds (PEO); Audrey Wagner (KEN); Evelyn Wawryshyn (FW)	22; 16; 13; 11; 10; 9; 8; 8; 8; 8; 8
Triples	Eleanor Callow (ROC); Edythe Perlick (RAC); Doris Satterfield (GR); Betty Trezza (RAC); Jean Cione (KEN); Connie Wisniewski (GR); Evelyn Wawryshyn (FW); Wilma Briggs (FW); Helen Candaele (KEN); Madeline English (RAC); Dorothy Harrell (ROC)	11; 9; 8; 8; 7; 7; 6; 5; 5; 5; 5
Home runs	Thelma Eisen (FW); Inez Voyce (GR); Audrey Wagner (KEN); Eleanor Callow (ROC); Sophie Kurys (RAC); Edythe Perlick (RAC); Doris Satterfield (GR)	3; 3; 3; 3; 2; 2; 2
Runs batted in	Elizabeth Mahon (SB); Doris Satterfield (GR); Inez Voyce (GR); Dorothy Harrell (ROC); Alva Jo Fischer (MUS); Edythe Perlick (RAC); Ruth Lessing (GR); Betty Whiting (SB); Senaida Wirth (SB); Lavonne Paire (GR); Eleanor Callow (ROC)	60; 58; 53; 50; 47; 41; 40; 40; 40; 37; 36
Stolen bases	Sophie Kurys (RAC); Ernestine Petras (KEN); Dorothy Kamenshek (ROC); Mary Baker (SB); Charlene Pryer (MUS); Elizabeth Mahon (SB); Senaida Wirth (SB); Helen Candaele (KEN); Betty Wagoner (SB); Evelyn Wawryshyn (FW)	137; 73; 69; 68; 68; 66; 66; 65; 64; 64
Total bases	Doris Satterfield (GR); Connie Wisniewski (GR); Edythe Perlick (RAC); Eleanor Callow (ROC); Elizabeth Mahon (SB); Evelyn Wawryshyn (FW); Vivian Kellogg (FW); Sophie Kurys (RAC); Dorothy Kamenshek (ROC); Helen Candaele (KEN); Inez Voyce (GR)	153; 140; 120; 119; 119; 118; 117; 117; 114; 113; 111

== Pitching statistics ==
Statistic	Player	Record
Wins	Jean Faut (SB); Lois Florreich (ROC); Lillian Faralla (SB); Louise Erickson (ROC); Mildred Deegan (FW); Jean Cione (KEN); Earlene Risinger (GR); Doris Sams (MUS); Mildred Earp (GR); Maxine Kline (FW)	24; 22; 19; 17; 16; 15; 15; 15; 14; 14
Winning percentage	Rose Gacioch (ROC); Jean Faut (SB); Lois Florreich (ROC); Louise Erickson (ROC); Louise Arnold (SB); Lillian Faralla (SB); Jaynie Krick (SB); Alma Ziegler (GR); Ruth Williams (SB); Helen Nicol (ROC)	.818.750.750.739.714.679.667.667.625.619
Earned run average	Lois Florreich (ROC); Helen Nicol (ROC); Jean Faut (SB); Lillian Faralla (SB); Ruby Stephens (KEN); Louise Erickson (ROC); Jean Cione (KEN); Doris Sams (MUS); Ruth Williams (SB); Rose Gacioch (ROC)	0.67; 0.98; 1.10; 1.36; 1.38; 1.54; 1.57; 1.58; 1.64; 1.68
Strikeouts	Lois Florreich (ROC); Mildred Earp (GR); Jean Faut (SB); Earlene Risinger (GR); Dorothy Mueller (PEO); Kay Blumetta (FW); Barbara Rotvig (KEN); Alva Jo Fischer (MUS); Mildred Deegan (FW); Doris Sams (MUS)	210; 143; 120; 116; 114; 102; 97; 86; 82; 81
Games pitched	Lillian Faralla (SB); Jean Faut (SB); Erma Bergmann (RAC); Jean Cione (KEN); Ruby Stephens (KEN); Joanne Winter (RAC); Earlene Risinger (GR); Lois Florreich (ROC); Mildred Deegan (FW); Maxine Kline (FW); Doris Sams (MUS)	34; 34; 32; 32; 32; 32; 30; 29; 28; 28; 28
Innings pitched	Lois Florreich (ROC); Jean Faut (SB); Lillian Faralla (SB); Mildred Deegan (FW); Earlene Risinger (GR); Maxine Kline (FW); Joanne Winter (RAC); Erma Bergmann (RAC); Jean Cione (KEN); Alice Haylett (GR)	269; 261; 245; 234; 234; 229; 228; 225; 223; 220

== See also ==
- 1949 Major League Baseball season
- 1949 Nippon Professional Baseball season
