= Audrey Haine =

Canadian baseball player (1927–2021)

- Pitcher
- Born: May 9, 1927; Winnipeg, Manitoba, Canada
- Died: September 11, 2021 (aged 94)
- Batted: Right Threw: Right
- Stats at Baseball Reference

Teams
- Minneapolis Millerettes (1944); Fort Wayne Daisies (1945–1946); Grand Rapids Chicks (1946–1947); Peoria Redwings (1947–1948); Rockford Peaches (1951)

Career highlights and awards
- Pitched two no-hitters (1944, 1945); Inductions: Manitoba Sports Hall of Fame (2009); Canadian Baseball Hall of Fame (1998); Manitoba Softball Hall of Fame (1998); Women in Baseball – AAGPBL Permanent Display at Baseball Hall of Fame and Museum (1988)

Audrey Haine Daniels (May 9, 1927 – September 11, 2021) was a pitcher who played in the All-American Girls Professional Baseball League between the 1944 and 1951 seasons. Listed at 5' 9", 150 lb., she batted and threw right handed.

A native of Winnipeg, Manitoba, Audrey Haine was one of the 57 players born in Canada to join the All-American Girls Professional Baseball League in its twelve years history.

Haine took the long road to enter the new circuit of girls professional ball players. At 16 she played softball for the St. Anthony Brown Bombers in the Winnipeg Catholic League and with the St. Vital Tigerettes of the Greater Winnipeg Senior Girls Softball League. On several occasions in the early 1940s, she struck out 21 batters during a regular seven-inning game in her district league.

Haine pitched sidearm, with a rising fastball and a strong curveball, but like many hard-throwers she struggled with control at times. She recorded four winning full seasons, averaging 15 wins in each of these seasons and pitching a pair of no-hitters.

Haine entered the league in 1944 with the Minneapolis Millerettes, an expansion and unsuccessful team managed by Bubber Jonnard. The Millerettes finished 26 and a half games out of first place, with a 45–72 record, and did not return for the next year. She finished with an 8–20 record and a 4.85 earned run average in a career-high 230 innings, while leading the league in earned runs (124) and wild pitches (29). One of her eight wins was a no-hitter against the Kenosha Comets on August 26 of that year.

Haine opened 1945 with the Fort Wayne Daisies, who replaced the Minneapolis team. The Daisies, with Bill Wambsganss at the helm, was a talented squad that included in their roster players as the sisters Helen and Marge Callaghan, Faye Dancer, Vivian Kellogg, Ruth Lessing and Pepper Paire. Haine improved in a most positive environment as part of a top three pitching rotation that included Annabelle Lee and Dorothy Wiltse, going 16–10 with a 2.46 ERA in 33 decisions. She finished sixth in the league with a .615 winning percentage and tied for eight in wins. In addition, she hurled her second career no-hitter on June 15, in a rain-shortened, six-inning game.

Meanwhile, Fort Wayne upset the Racine Belles in the first round of the playoffs, three to one games, but lost the best-of-seven series to the Rockford Peaches, four games to one. Haine lost a 3-1 decision to Carolyn Morris and the Belles in Game 3.

In 1946, Haine started with Fort Wayne but was traded to the Grand Rapids Chicks during the midseason. The change probably affected her performance during the year, as she combined for a 4.02 ERA and set an all-time single season record for the most base on balls (236), though she posted a 14–11 mark and ranked sixth in strikeouts (120).

Haine found herself on the move again in 1947, while dividing her playing time between Grand Rapids and the Peoria Redwings. She finished 13–12 with 2.89 ERA in 28 pitching appearances. Her most productive season came in 1948, when she posted a 17–14 record and a 2.92 ERA for Peoria, setting a career-high for wins and a second-best for innings (2.28).

In 1948, Haine left the league to marry Bud Daniels. She returned in 1951 under her married name, Audrey Daniels, and spent the year with the Rockford Peaches. In her last season, she went 4–3 with a 3.82 ERA and 66 innings of work in only ten games.

Following her baseball career, she gave birth to six children, including a set of twins. Then she helped start a family business.

In 1988, Audrey Haine Daniels was honored along with the rest of the All-American Girls Professional Baseball League during the opening of a permanent display at the Baseball Hall of Fame and Museum in Cooperstown, New York. The same year, Audrey and another 10 girls from Manitoba who played in the AAGPBL were inducted both into the Canadian and the Manitoba Baseball Halls of Fame. She was a longtime resident of Bay Village, Ohio.

Haine died on September 11, 2021.

== Career statistics ==
Batting

GP	AB	R	H	2B	3B	HR	RBI	SB	TB	BB	SO	BA	OBP	SLG	OPS
174	426	41	74	8	1	0	29	9	84	30	39	.174	.228	.197	.425

Pitching

GP	W	L	W-L%	ERA	IP	RA	ER	H	BB	SO	HBP	WP	WHIP
167	72	70	.507	3.48	1154	638	446	851	835	493	82	96	1.46
