= 1947 All-American Girls Professional Baseball League season =

- League: All-American Girls Professional Baseball League
- Sport: Baseball
- Teams: Eight

Regular season
- Season champions: Muskegon Lassies

Shaugnessy playoffs
- Champions: Grand Rapids Chicks

AAGPBL seasons
- 1946 1948

The 1947 All-American Girls Professional Baseball League season marked the fifth season of the circuit. The teams Fort Wayne Daisies, Grand Rapids Chicks, Kenosha Comets, Muskegon Lassies, Peoria Redwings, Racine Belles, Rockford Peaches and South Bend Blue Sox competed through a 112-game schedule. The final Shaugnessy playoffs faced second place Grand Rapids against third place Racine in a Best of Seven Series.

By April 1947, all of the league's players were flown to Havana, Cuba for spring training. At the time, the Brooklyn Dodgers trained in the Cuban capital because Jackie Robinson, who would be the first Afro-American to play in the Major Leagues, was training with the Dodgers for the first time. By then, city ordinances in Vero Beach, Florida, where the Dodgers normally trained, prevented black and white players from competing on the same field against each other. Notably, newspaper stories from Havana indicate that the All-American girls drew larger crowds for their exhibition games at Estadio Latinoamericano than did the Dodgers.

In addition to the eight team practices, nearly 55,000 Cuban fans attended a round-robin tournament which took place at Estadio Latinoamericano at the end of the training. The Racine Belles won the tournament and received a commemorative trophy from Esther Williams, American competitive swimmer and MGM movie star.

All in all, the rules, strategy and general play were the same in 1947. The sidearm pitching was strictly used, as the league was moving toward full overhand delivery for the next season. The sidearm throwing allowed the hitters more of an advantage than previous seasons. Rockford's Dorothy Kamenshek repeated her batting crown with a .306 batting average in a close race with Audrey Wagner (.305) of Kenosha. Nevertheless, five no-hitters were recorded during the regular season by Racine's Doris Barr, Muskegon Erma Bergmann, Kenosha's Jean Cione, and Rockford's Margaret Holgerson and Betty Luna. The pitching highlight came from Muskegon's Doris Sams, who hurled the third perfect game in league history. In addition, P/OF Sams posted an 11–4 record and a 0.98 earned run average in 19 pitching appearances, while batting a combined average of .280 (97-for-346) in 107 total games. Following the season, Sams was honored with the AAGPBL Player of the Year Award.

At the end, Grand Rapids, Muskegon and Racine battled for the regular season title, until Muskegon got the victory with just two days remaining in the schedule. During the playoffs, Muskegon lost to Racine in the first round, three games to one, behind a strong pitching effort from Anna Mae Hutchison, who was credited with all three victories for Racine. In the other series, Grand Rapids defeated South Bend in five games guided by Connie Wisniewski, who pitched a win, stole home plate for another win, and collected an average of .318 (7-for-22).

The second round was a tight fight, when the first three contests all went to extra innings and Grand Rapids held a 3–1 advantage in the best of seven series. But the defending champion Racine won the next two games to force a decisive game seven. In a pitching duel, Mildred Earp defeated Hutchison and the Belles on a 1–0, five hit shutout, while driving in the winning run to give Grand Rapids the championship.

In 1947 average crowds at AAGPBL games were two to three thousand people, while attendance records were set in Muskegon, Peoria and Racine ballparks.

== Teams ==
1947 All-American Girls Professional Baseball League Teams
| Team | City | Stadium |
| Fort Wayne Daisies | Fort Wayne, Indiana | Memorial Park |
| Grand Rapids Chicks | Grand Rapids, Michigan | South High School Field |
| Kenosha Comets | Kenosha, Wisconsin | Lake Front Stadium |
| Muskegon Lassies | Muskegon, Michigan | Marsh Field |
| Peoria Redwings | Peoria, Illinois | Peoria Stadium |
| Racine Belles | Racine, Wisconsin | Horlick Field |
| Rockford Peaches | Rockford, Illinois | Rockford Municipal Stadium |
| South Bend Blue Sox | South Bend, Indiana | Playland Park |

== Map of teams ==
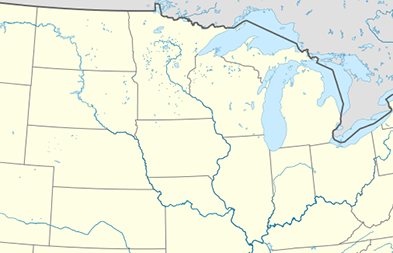
All-American Girls Professional Baseball League teams

== Final standings ==
| Rank | Team | W | L | W-L% | GB |
|---|---|---|---|---|---|
| 1 | Muskegon Lassies | 69 | 43 | .616 | – |
| 2 | Grand Rapids Chicks | 64 | 46 | .582 | 4 |
| 3 | Racine Belles | 65 | 47 | .580 | 4 |
| 4 | South Bend Blue Sox | 57 | 54 | .514 | 11½ |
| 5 | Peoria Redwings | 54 | 57 | .487 | 14½ |
| 6 | Rockford Peaches | 48 | 63 | .432 | 19½ |
| 7 | Fort Wayne Daisies | 44 | 66 | .400 | 24 |
| 8 | Kenosha Comets | 43 | 69 | .384 | 26 |

== Postseason ==
First round Best of five series
1 | Muskegon Lassies | 1
3 | Racine Belles | 3
2 | Grand Rapids Chicks | 3
4 | South Bend Blue Sox | 2

Second round Best of seven series
1 | Racine Belles | 3
2 | Grand Rapids Chicks | 4

== Batting statistics ==
| Statistic | Player | Record |
|---|---|---|
| Batting average | Dorothy Kamenshek (ROC); Audrey Wagner (KEN); Connie Wisniewski (GR); Doris Sams (MUS); Josephine Lenard (MUS); Mary Nesbitt (PEO); Rose Gacioch (ROC); Charlene Pryer (MUS); Eleanor Callow; Mary Reynolds (PEO); Edythe Perlick (RAC); Faye Dancer (PEO/FW); Margaret Stefani (SB) | .306.305.291.280.261.261.257.249.245.245.239.237.237 |
| Runs scored | Sophie Kurys (RAC); Edythe Perlick (RAC); Josephine Lenard (MUS); Alma Ziegler (GR); Mary Baker (SB); Dorothy Kamenshek (ROC); Faye Dancer (PEO/FW); Pauline Pirok (SB); Charlene Pryer (MUS); Thelma Eisen (FW); Audrey Wagner (KEN); Mary Nesbitt (PEO) | 81; 62; 58; 55; 54; 52; 51; 51; 51; 49; 48; 47 |
| Hits | Audrey Wagner (KEN); Dorothy Kamenshek (ROC); Charlene Pryer (MUS); Edythe Perlick (RAC); Mary Nesbitt (PEO); Josephine Lenard (MUS); Sophie Kurys (RAC); Mary Reynolds (PEO); Doris Sams (MUS); Lavonne Paire (RAC); Faye Dancer (PEO/FW) | 119; 112; 105; 104; 104; 102; 99; 98; 97; 97; 90 |
| Doubles | Audrey Wagner (KEN); Mary Reynolds (PEO); Lavonne Paire (RAC); Faye Dancer (PEO/FW); Betsy Jochum (SB); Edythe Perlick (RAC); Marjorie Pieper (FW/KEN); Dorothy Kamenshek (ROC); Josephine Lenard (MUS); Ruth Lessing (GR); Mary Nesbitt (PEO); Sophie Kurys (RAC) | 25; 17; 14; 11; 11; 11; 11; 10; 10; 9; 9; 8 |
| Triples | Mary Nesbitt (PEO); Audrey Wagner (KEN); Dorothy Kamenshek (ROC); Elizabeth Mahon (SB); Marie Mahoney (SB); Alice Hohlmayer (KEN); Edythe Perlick (RAC); Faye Dancer (PEO/FW); Eleanor Dapkus (RAC); Betsy Jochum (SB); Theda Marshall (SB); Marjorie Pieper (FW); Doris Sams (MUS) | 11; 9; 8; 8; 7; 6; 6; 5; 5; 5; 5; 5; 5 |
| Home runs | Audrey Wagner (KEN); Dorothy Kamenshek (ROC); Marjorie Pieper (FW); Thelma Eisen (PEO/FW); Mary Nesbitt (PEO); Faye Dancer (PEO/FW); Eleanor Dapkus (RAC); Arleene Johnson (MUS); Edythe Perlick (RAC); Margaret Stefani (SB) | 7; 6; 5; 3; 3; 2; 2; 2; 2; 2 |
| Runs batted in | Audrey Wagner (KEN); Lavonne Paire (RAC); Inez Voyce (GR); Mary Nesbitt (PEO); Betsy Jochum (SB); Ruth Lessing (GR); Eleanor Dapkus (RAC); Dorothy Harrell (ROC); Doris Sams (MUS); Edythe Perlick (RAC); Marjorie Pieper (FW); Margaret Stefani (SB) | 53; 50; 45; 43; 42; 42; 41; 41; 41; 39; 38; 38 |
| Stolen bases | Sophie Kurys (RAC); Josephine Lenard (MUS); Edythe Perlick (RAC); Charlene Pryer (MUS); Faye Dancer (PEO/FW); Dorothy Ferguson (ROC); Dorothy Kamenshek (ROC); Betty Trezza (RAC); Dorothy Stolze (MUS); Alma Ziegler (GR) | 142; 83; 83; 76; 71; 71; 66; 66; 65; 62 |
| Total bases | Audrey Wagner (KEN); Dorothy Kamenshek (ROC); Mary Nesbitt (PEO); Edythe Perlick (RAC); Mary Reynolds (PEO); Sophie Kurys (RAC); Doris Sams (MUS); Charlene Pryer (MUS); Josephine Lenard (MUS); Lavonne Paire (RAC) | 183; 156; 144; 133; 128; 125; 116; 115; 114; 111 |

== Pitching statistics ==
| Statistic | Player | Record |
|---|---|---|
| Wins | Anna Mae Hutchison (RAC); Joanne Winter (RAC); Mildred Earp (GR); Dorothy Wiltse (FW); Jean Cione (ROC/KEN); Jean Faut (SB); Alice Haylett (GR); Nancy Warren (MUS); Amy Applegren (MUS); Phyllis Koehn (SB); Connie Wisniewski (GR) | 27; 22; 20; 20; 19; 19; 19; 17; 16; 16; 16 |
| Earned run average | Mildred Earp (GR); Doris Sams (MUS); Amy Applegren (MUS); Nancy Warren (MUS); Jean Faut (SB); Jean Cione (ROC/KEN); Dorothy Wiltse (FW); Anna Mae Hutchison (RAC); Dorothy Mueller (PEO); Donna Cook (MUS); Jaynne Bittner (SB) | 0.68; 0.98; 1.06; 1.13; 1.15; 1.30; 1.33; 1.38; 1.41; 1.42; 1.54 |
| Strikeouts | Dorothy Wiltse (GR); Mildred Earp (GR); Joanne Winter (RAC); Anna Mae Hutchison (RAC); Dorothy Mueller (PEO); Kay Blumetta (PEO/FW); Jean Cione (ROC/KEN); Jean Faut (SB); Doris Barr (RAC); Nancy Warren (MUS); Alice Haylett | 244; 192; 121; 120; 112; 105; 98; 97; 96; 93; 92 |
| Games pitched | Dorothy Mueller (PEO); Jean Faut (SB); Anna Mae Hutchison (RAC); Dorothy Wiltse (GR); Joanne Winter (RAC); Jean Cione (ROC); Mildred Earp (GR); Phyllis Koehn (SB); Connie Wisniewski (GR); Alice Haylett (GR); Ruby Stephens (SB); Nancy Warren (MUS); Doris Barr (RAC) | 48; 44; 44; 40; 38; 37; 35; 34; 32; 31; 31; 31; 30 |
| Innings pitched | Anna Mae Hutchison (RAC); Dorothy Mueller (PEO); Jean Faut (SB); Joanne Winter (RAC); Dorothy Wiltse (GR); Mildred Earp (GR); Jean Cione (ROC); Phyllis Koehn (SB); Connie Wisniewski (GR); Alice Haylett (GR); Betty Luna (ROC); Josephine Kabick (PEO); Nancy Warren (MUS); Amy Applegren (MUS) | 360; 312; 298; 297; 292; 280; 271; 265; 264; 258; 234; 231; 223; 220 |

== See also ==
- 1947 Major League Baseball season
