= William Rohrer =

- Manager
- Born: August 20, 1892; Hastings, Nebraska, U.S.
- Died: n/a
- Batted: Unknown Threw: Unknown

Teams
- Fort Wayne Daisies (1947)

Career highlights and awards
- Women in Baseball – AAGPBL Permanent Display at Baseball Hall of Fame and Museum (1988)

William "Daddy" Rohrer (August 20, 1892 – unknown) was an All-American Girls Professional Baseball League manager and Minor League Baseball player. He played under the name of John H. Rohrer.

Born in Hastings, Nebraska, Rohrer started his professional baseball career at the age of 16. He spent 12 seasons in the minors as a light-hitting, good-fielding catcher for ten teams in five different leagues, primarily with the Oakland Oaks and Salt Lake City Bees of the Pacific Coast League. Spanning 1909–1920, he posted a .217 batting average and a .230 of slugging in 826 games.

Following his playing career, Rohrer turned to managing in the then-outlaw California League. After that, he started to coach and train some of the finest girls' softball teams in the California area, and worked with them to put together an all-star team. The team made a successful three-month tour of China, Japan and the Philippines, just prior to World War II.

Rohrer later turned to scouting and worked for the All-American Girls Professional Baseball League. He was responsible for signing future AAGPBL stars as Dorothy Harrell, Dorothy Wiltse, Alma Ziegler and his own daughter, Kay Rohrer. He also took over as manager of the Fort Wayne Daisies in the 1947 season.

The AAGPBL folded in 1954, but there is now a permanent display at the Baseball Hall of Fame and Museum at Cooperstown, New York, since November 5, 1988, that honors those who were part of the league. Rohrer, along with the rest of the league's personnel, has his name honored at Cooperstown.
