= Kay Rohrer =

- Catcher
- Born: June 29, 1922; Los Angeles, California, U.S.
- Died: March 17, 1962 (aged 39); Phoenix, Arizona, U.S.
- Batted: Right Threw: Right
- Stats at Baseball Reference

Teams
- Rockford Peaches (1945)

Career highlights and awards
- Championship team (1945); Arizona Softball Hall of Fame induction (1976); Women in Baseball – AAGPBL Permanent Display at Baseball Hall of Fame and Museum (1988)

Kay Rohrer (June 29, 1922 – March 17, 1962) was a catcher who played in the All-American Girls Professional Baseball League (AAGPBL). Listed at 5 ft 7 in (1.70 m), 139 lb, she batted and threw right-handed.

A member of a championship team, Kay Rohrer was one of the best hitting catchers during her only season in the league, ranking among the top 10 players in multiple offensive categories.

Born in Los Angeles, California, Kay grew up in a baseball oriented family. Her father, William Rohrer, was a minor league catcher who eventually would manage in the All-American Girls Professional Baseball League, while her grandfather, Ulysses Rohrer, was a 19th-century minor leaguer. At an early age, she served as a mascot and batgirl for a team managed by her father. She spent the majority of the time following her father around at the ballpark.

In 1938, her sophomore year in high school, Rohrer was 14 years old when she started playing softball in a girls team sponsored by Cantala-Tanzola, transporters of bulk petroleum company. The team was managed by her father. But she was not the only young lady whose star was on the rise. Her teammate, Dorothy Wiltse, would become one of the most dominant pitchers in AAGPBL history. Due in part to Mr. Rohrer's guidance, the girls became a key component for Cantala-Tanzala since they operated together as one well-assembled, pitcher-catcher battery.

In an interview, a mature Wiltse explained that Kay "would sit on her haunches without moving and just take her arm and, 'whoo', throw out people at second base just like that". At the time, such headlines as "Kid Battery Opposes Vets" and "Kid Battery Performs Today" raced across the sports pages in the Los Angeles newspapers. One write-up noted "The 'baby battery' swings into action tonight. Dot Wiltse and Kay Rohrer, pitcher and catcher who form the battery for Cantlay Tanzola, are fourteen years old but figure to give Bank of America a run for its money in their softball clash at Fiedler Sunset Field."

Nevertheless, Kay was not just a talented ballplayer, she was also a beautiful woman. In 1941 she was interviewed by Harry Cohn, president and production director of Columbia Pictures, who invited her into their studios for a photo shoot and to discuss a contract. To groom her for the stardom that never came, Kay was featured in several movie magazines. She also was under contract with Paramount Pictures and later with Technicolor Corporation, before joining the league in 1945 with the Rockford Peaches.

During the 1945 season, the strong pitching led to depressed batting averages in the AAGPBL, as the six teams combined for a .188 mark. A record nine no-hitters were hurled during the season, including a perfect game by Rockford's Carolyn Morris, while Racine Belles' Mary Nesbitt was the only hitter to top the .300 mark (.319). Rohrer tied for seventh in average with her teammate Dorothy Harrell and Racine's Sophie Kurys at .239, and also tied for second in home runs (2) and for eight in doubles (8). The Peaches, managed by Bill Allington, became the first team to win both the season title and the championship in league history. Rohrer scored three runs and hit .185 (5-for-27) in nine postseason games, while her RBI-triple in Game 1 of the final series proved to be the winning run in a 2–1 victory against the Fort Wayne Daisies.

After her AAGPBL days Rohrer moved to Phoenix, Arizona, where she achieved a distinguished career in the Arizona Softball League. She earned All-American honors in 1948 while leading the A-1 Queens of Phoenix to the national championship. She also played with the Phoenix Westerners, Mesa Premiums, Funk Gems and Phoenix Ramblers from 1954 through 1962, helping the Ramblers to three runner-up spots in national tournaments. In addition, she appeared in the American Softball Association All-Star Game held at Stratford, Connecticut in 1961.

Besides her sporting activities Kay found time to enjoy music and flying as she held a pilots license. She died in 1962 at the early age of 39 due to complications of breast cancer, with her partner Dot Wilkinson at her side.

In 1979, Kay Rohrer received a posthumous induction into the Arizona Softball Hall of Fame. She also forms part of Women in Baseball, a permanent display opened in 1988 at the Baseball Hall of Fame and Museum in Cooperstown, New York to honor the entire AAGPBL.

== Career statistics ==
Batting

GP	AB	R	H	2B	3B	HR	RBI	SB	TB	BB	SO	BA	OBP	SLG
100	327	34	78	8	1	2	26	26	94	33	9	.239	.308	.288

Fielding

GP	PO	A	E	TC	DP	FA
92	396	106	21	523	10	.960
