= Annabelle Lee =

- Pitcher
- Born: January 22, 1922; Los Angeles, California, U.S.
- Died: July 3, 2008 (aged 86); Costa Mesa, California, U.S.
- Batted: Both Threw: Left

debut
- 1944, for the Minneapolis Millerettes

Last appearance
- 1950, for the Peoria Redwings

Career statistics
- Win–loss record: 42–62
- Strikeouts: 252

Teams
- Minneapolis Millerettes (1944); Fort Wayne Daisies (1945); Peoria Redwings (1946–1947); Grand Rapids Chicks (1947); Fort Wayne Daisies (1948); Peoria Redwings (1949, 1950)

Career highlights and awards
- AAGPBL champion (1947); Pitched a perfect game on July 29, 1944; Pitched two no-hitters (1944, 1945)

Annabelle Lee Harmon (January 22, 1922 – July 3, 2008) was an American female pitcher who played from 1944 through 1950 with four teams of the All-American Girls Professional Baseball League (AAGPBL). Listed at 5 ft 2 in (1.57 m), 120 lb, Lee was a switch-hitter and threw left-handed. She was born in Los Angeles, California. She was the aunt of Bill Lee, a former Boston Red Sox and Montreal Expos pitcher.

== Early life and early career ==
Anabelle Lee grew up in a home where baseball was considered of vital importance, as her father was an early 1920s baseball standout for the Hollywood Stars of the Pacific Coast League, while her nephew Bill Lee pitched in Major League Baseball for the Boston Red Sox and Montreal Expos. According to Bill Lee, his aunt "was the best athlete in the family. She taught me how to pitch." She played her first season in the AAGPBL with the expansion franchise Minneapolis Millerettes.

== AAGPBL career ==
Lee was allocated to the expansion Minneapolis Millerettes in 1944. "I was excited and scared all at the same time; I was thrilled to leave behind my $95-a-month bank clerk's position for an $85-a-week", she recalled in an interview. With the guidance of her father, Lee excelled at sports at a very early age. "To teach me pitching accuracy, he made me throw a baseball through a tire hung from a tree and then at a strike zone painted on an old mattress", she added. She pitched a perfect game on July 29, 1944 against the Kenosha Comets, the first in league history.

Using underhand fastball pitching in her first season, Lee posted an 11–14 record with a 2.43 ERA in 29 appearances, and the 9th-best ERA in the league. She allowed 96 runs, 39 of them unearned, and struck out 56 batters. The Millerettes, managed by Bubber Jonnard, compiled the worst mark of the league (45–72) and finished last in both halves of the season, 8½ games back of fifth place overall, 26½ out of first. Besides this, she hurled a no-hitter the next season and posted a solid career 2.25 earned run average during her seven years in the league.

According to Lee, "I was a junkball pitcher, but I had a great knuckleball". In her debut season, she combined with Wiltze (20–16, 1.88 ERA) for 31 of the 45 victories of the helpless Millerettes. The team received some pretty good performances from Helen Callaghan, who hit .287 (2nd in the league) and Faye Dancer (.274, 44 extra bases), who became the first girl to hit two home runs in a single game and two grand slams in a regular season. Playing their home games at Nicollet Park, the Millerettes could not compete with the local Minneapolis Millers. In addition, Minneapolis was far from the other five cities in the league, forcing the team to spend most of the season on the road. As a result, the team was replaced by the Fort Wayne Daisies in the 1945 season.

In 1945 Fort Wayne inherited a few players from Minneapolis, including Helen Callaghan and her older sister Marge as well as Ruth Lessing, Betty Trezza, Dancer, Paire and Lee. With Bill Wambsganss at the helm, the Daisies went 62–47 and finished 4½ games behind the first place Rockford Peaches. Lee finished with a 13–16 mark despite a 1.56 ERA (6th in the league), though low run support remained a crucial issue. Helen Callaghan was one of the few bright spots in the team, winning the batting crown with a .295 average and tying with teammate Dancer for the league-lead in homers (3). Fort Wayne advanced to the playoffs and disposed of the Racine Belles in the first round, three to one games, but was beaten by the Rockford Peaches in the final best-of-seven series, four to one games.

Lee continued moving around for a while, as the AAGPBL shifted players as needed to help teams stay afloat. This time she joined the expansion Peoria Redwings in 1946 and was back with a last-place team. Lee went 12–23 with a 2.74 ERA as she led the league in losses. In 1947, pitching sidearm, she began with Peoria and landed with the Grand Rapids Chicks during the midseason. She posted a combined mark of 9–11 with 29 strikeouts and a 2.24 ERA in 24 games. During the first round of the playoffs, Grand Rapids lost to Rockford in five games.

In 1948, the league switched over to overhand pitching and moved the mound back further. Lee returned to Fort Wayne Daisies and went 10–14 with a 2.25 ERA in 27 games. She allowed 78 runs, 56 earned, while striking out 56 batters. The Daisies finished fourth in the Eastern Division (53–72) and advanced to the playoffs, beating the Muskegon Lassies in the first round (3-to-1) and Grand Rapids in the semi-finals (3-to-0), but were defeated by Rockford in the best-of-seven series, four to one games.

Lee continued to switch teams on a regular basis. This time she landed back to Peoria in 1949 and again suffered from the horrendous offensive deficiencies of a last-place team, ending with a 5–14 record and a 2.18 ERA that year. She pitched her final season in 1950 and was 3–4 with a 2.51 ERA for Peoria.

Lee is also recognized as one of the few pitchers in the AAGPBL to pitch all three pitching styles adopted in the league's history, fastpitch underhand, sidearm, and overhand. Unfortunately, she never enjoyed a winning season on her way to a 63–96 career record, due to pitching mostly for awful teams with bad defense and a low run support.

When asked about the 1992 film A League of Their Own, a fictionalized account of activities in the AAGPBL created by Penny Marshall, Lee said the film was about 70% accurate. In real life, the managers never entered the women's dressing rooms, she mused. It was a time when women took over men's positions as they went off to war, not only in the field of manufacturing, but on the field of dreams, she concluded.

Lee is part of the AAGPBL permanent display at the Baseball Hall of Fame and Museum at Cooperstown, New York, opened in 1988, which is dedicated to the entire league rather than any individual player.

== AAGPBL perfect games ==
Pitcher(s)	Season	Team	Opponent
Annabelle Lee	1944	Minneapolis Millerettes	Kenosha Comets
Carolyn Morris	1945	Rockford Peaches	Fort Wayne Daisies
Doris Sams	1947	Muskegon Lassies	Fort Wayne Daisies
Jean Faut	1951	South Bend Blue Sox	Rockford Peaches
Jean Faut	1953	South Bend Blue Sox	Kalamazoo Lassies
