= Vivian Kellogg =

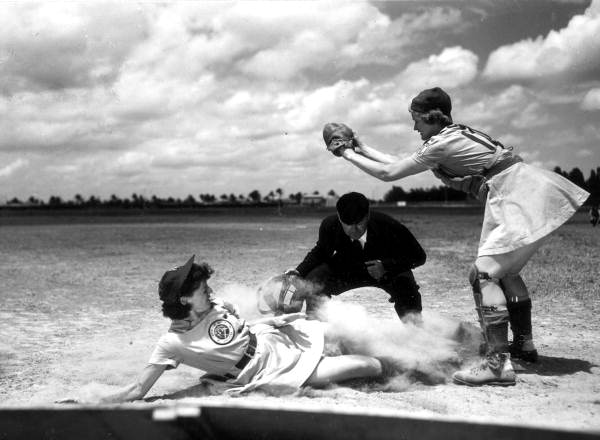
- Kellogg reaches for a ball during a 1948 game
- First base
- Born: November 6, 1922; Brooklyn, Michigan, U.S.
- Died: December 13, 2013 (aged 91); Jackson, Michigan, U.S.
- Batted: right Threw: right
- Stats at Baseball Reference

Teams
- Minneapolis Millerettes (1944); Fort Wayne Daisies (1945–1950)

Career highlights and awards
- Four playoffs appearances (1945, 1948–1950); Women in Baseball – AAGPBL Permanent Display at Baseball Hall of Fame and Museum (1988)

Vivian Caroline Kellogg [″Kelly″] (November 6, 1922 – December 13, 2013) was an American baseball player who played first base from 1944 through 1950 in the All-American Girls Professional Baseball League (AAGPBL). She batted and threw right-handed.

Kellogg was born and raised in Jackson, Michigan. She grew up playing sandlot ball with her neighborhood kids at an early age, most of them boys, but did not start playing organized softball until she was 16. Kellogg graduated from Jackson High School in 1943 and was approached by a scout of the AAGPBL when she was playing softball for the Jackson Regent Cafe team in a state tournament. After school she had played basketball, volleyball, tennis, and field hockey in addition to softball. Kellogg signed a contract offer for $75 a week plus food expenses when she first joined the league, because that figure doubled her pay as a Bell Telephone operator at the time.

Kellogg entered the AAGPBL in 1944 with the expansion Minneapolis Millerettes. She hit a .202 batting average in 111 games, including 46 runs batted in while scoring 20 runs. The Millerettes, managed by former major leaguer Bubber Jonnard, compiled the worst mark of the league (45–72) and finished last in both halves of the season, 8½ games back of fifth place overall, 26½ out of first. The team did have some good performances from Helen Callaghan and Faye Dancer, two of the top batters in the league, while the pitching staff was led by Dorothy Wiltse, who posted a 20–16 record with a 1.88 earned run average (fourth in the league), and Annabelle Lee, who finished 11–14 with a 2.43 ERA and hurled the first perfect game in the league's history. Due to the lack of fan support and close competition, the Millerettes folded at the end of the season and were replaced by the Fort Wayne Daisies in 1944.

Kellogg spent the rest of her career in the league with the Daisies, averaging 100 or more games at first base in five of her six seasons for them, with a career-high 126 games in 1948. In that year, she also posted career-numbers in average (.248), hits (117), runs (52) and RBI (43), while leading the league with most at-bats (472) and games played at first base. Both durable and dependable defensive player, she missed a significant part of the 1946 season after suffering a severe knee injury. She earned trips to the playoffs in 1945 and from 1948 through 1950, but Fort Wayne struggled in the post-season and never won a championship title. She was forced to retire in 1951, due to a recurrent knee injury.

Following her baseball career, Kellogg returned to her home town of Jackson, Michigan. She eventually moved to the nearby village of Brooklyn in 1968. After baseball she worked as a dentist receptionist for 30 years, retiring in 1979, while continuing to participate in many sport activities, mainly bowling. Her prowess in this area led to her induction into the Jackson Bowling Hall of Fame in 1992, being also named as grand marshal in a parade. After that she became a Little League Baseball coach.

Kellogg is part of the AAGPBL permanent display at the Baseball Hall of Fame and Museum at Cooperstown, New York, which was inaugurated in 1988 in honor of the entire league rather than individual baseball personalities. She remained a Brooklyn resident and the field containing her namesake is the current home of the Columbia Central High School softball program.

On December 13, 2013, Kellogg died at the age of 91.

== Career statistics ==
Batting

GP	AB	R	H	2B	3B	HR	RBI	SB	TB	BB	SO	BA	OBP	SLG
747	2709	219	600	66	39	8	264	86	768	160	156	.221	.265	.283

Fielding

GP	PO	A	E	TC	DP	FA
726	6844	222	158	7324	240	.978
