= All-American Girls Professional Baseball League Player of the Year Award =

Starting in the 1945 season, on its third year of operation, the All-American Girls Professional Baseball League (AAGPBL) honored with the Player of the Year Award the top performer in the circuit. The AAGPBL folded at the end of the 1954 season. This is the list of winners.

== Winners ==
Year	Player	Team	Position	Highlights
1945	Connie Wisniewski	Grand Rapids Chicks	Pitcher	32–11, 0.81 earned run average
1946	Sophie Kurys	Racine Belles	Second base	.286 batting average, 117 runs, 201 stolen bases
1947	Doris Sams	Muskegon Lassies	Pitcher / Outfield	11–4, 0.98 ERA / .280 BA
1948	Audrey Wagner	Kenosha Comets	Outfield	.312 BA, 56 runs batted in, 70 runs, 53 SB, .469 slugging average
1949	Doris Sams	Muskegon Lassies	Pitcher / Outfield	15–10, 1.58 ERA / .279 BA, 35 R, 35 RBI, 29 SB
1950	Alma Ziegler	Grand Rapids Chicks	Pitcher	19–7, 1.38 ERA
1951	Jean Faut	South Bend Blue Sox	Pitcher	15–7, 1.33 ERA, 135 strikeouts, one perfect game
1952	Betty Foss	Fort Wayne Daisies	First base	.331 BA, .505 SLG, 74 RBI, 81 runs, 56 SB
1953	Jean Faut	South Bend Blue Sox	Pitcher	17–11, 1.51 ERA, 143 SO, one perfect game
1954	Joanne Weaver	Fort Wayne Daisies	Outfield	.429 BA, 29 home runs, 87 RBI, 109 runs, .763 SLG

== See also ==
- List of sports awards honoring women

== Sources ==
- All-American Girls Professional Baseball League Official Website
- All-American Girls Professional Baseball League Record Book – W. C. Madden. Publisher: McFarland & Company, 2000. Format: Paperback, 294pp. Language: English. ISBN 0-7864-3747-2
