= Muriel Bevis =

- Outfielder/Pitcher
- Born: October 7, 1928; Corona, Queens, New York, US
- Died: October 29, 2002 (aged 74); Mount Juliet, Tennessee, US
- Batted: Left Threw: Left

Teams
- Kenosha Comets (1950)

Career highlights and awards
- Postseason appearance (1950); Women in Baseball – AAGPBL Permanent Display at Baseball Hall of Fame and Museum (1988)

Muriel Bevis [″Breezy″] (October 7, 1928 – October 29, 2002) was an American outfielder and pitcher who played in All-American Girls Professional Baseball League during the 1950 season. Bevis batted and threw left-handed. She was born in Corona, Queens, New York City.

By 1943 a new All-American Girls Softball League was formed. Started largely to provide entertainment for baseball fans whose beloved heroes had gone off to World War II, the league would eventually shift gears and become the All-American Girls Professional Baseball League, which was dissolved at the end of the 1954 season.

Muriel Bevis was one of 25 players in the All-American Girls Professional Baseball League clubs who hailed from New York City and State, including Gloria Cordes, Mildred Deegan, Nancy Mudge, Betty Trezza and Margaret Wigiser.

Bevis grew up in Westhampton Beach and often found herself playing softball at Cedarhurst Stadium, where she was approached by a talent scout who offered her a contract to play in the AAGPBL.

Bevis entered the league in 1950 with the Kenosha Comets, and was used at outfield and as an emergency pitcher. She was a steady performer during her only season, ranking between the top ten in home runs (5), runs batted in (43) and stolen bases (38), helping Kenosha reach the playoffs, though the team lost in the first round of post-season action.

Bevis was a longtime resident of Kerrville, Texas, and later moved to Mount Juliet, Tennessee, where she died at the age of 74.

Batting statistics

GP	AB	R	H	2B	3B	HR	RBI	SB	BB	SO	BA	OBP	SLG
56	165	46	35	4	1	5	43	38	13	13	.212	.270	.340

Pitching statistics

GP	W	L	W-L%	ERA	IP	H	R	ER	BB	SO	WHIP
7	1	2	.333	6.83	29	30	27	22	25	5	1.896

== Fact ==
The AAGPBL Players Association movement helped to bring the league story to the public eye. The association was largely responsible for the opening of a permanent display at the Baseball Hall of Fame and Museum in Cooperstown, New York since November 5, 1988 that honors those who were part of this unique experience.
