= Thelma Eisen =

American baseball player

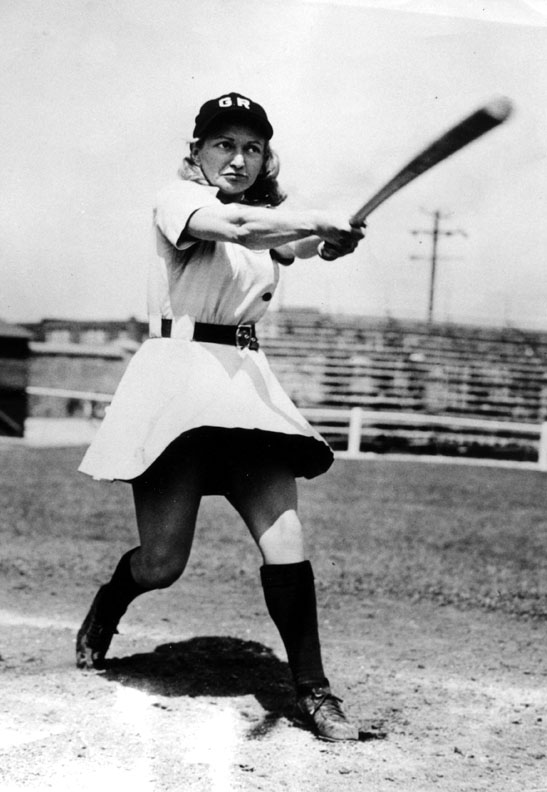
- Eisen in 1945 with the Grand Rapids Chicks
- Center fielder/Manager
- Born: May 11, 1922; Los Angeles, California, U.S.
- Died: May 11, 2014 (aged 92); Pacific Palisades, California, U.S.
- Batted: Right Threw: Right

debut
- 1944

Last appearance
- 1952

Teams
- Milwaukee Chicks (1944); Grand Rapids Chicks (1945); Peoria Redwings (1946–1947); Fort Wayne Daisies (1947–1952)

Career highlights and awards
- AAGPBL champion (1944); AAGPBL All-Star Team (1946); AAGPBL triples leader (1946); AAGPBL home runs leader (1949); National Jewish Sports Hall of Fame and Museum (2004)

Thelma "Tiby" Eisen (May 11, 1922 – May 11, 2014) was an American baseball outfielder who played from 1944 through 1952 in the All-American Girls Professional Baseball League (AAGPBL). Listed at 5' 4", 130 lb., she batted and threw right-handed.

Thelma Eisen was among the top players in the early years of the All-American Girls Professional Baseball League. A durable outfielder, she averaged 107 game appearances per season over her nine-year career. An All-Star in 1946, she reached the playoffs in seven of nine seasons (1944–1945, 1948–1952) and was part of the championship team in 1944.

Eisen was known for her defensive ability at all three outfield positions, primarily in center field, where she prevented extra-base hits with her range and fielding. She was also a disciplined hitter and an effective base runner, recording a .295 on-base percentage and 674 stolen bases in 966 career games.

Throughout her career, she played for four different teams, as the league frequently reassigned players to maintain competitive balance.

== Brief history ==
The All-American Girls Professional Baseball League operated between 1943 and 1954 and started with four teams: the Racine Belles and the Kenosha Comets, both from Wisconsin; the Rockford Peaches from Illinois, and the South Bend Blue Sox from Indiana. Originally, the game was a combination of baseball and softball. Differences were only in the distances between the bases, the distance from the pitching mound to home plate, the size of the ball, and pitching styles through the 12 years of existence of the circuit. It was a neglected chapter of sports history at least until the early 1980s, when a group of former AAGPBL members led by June Peppas organized a retired players association and lobbied to have the circuit recognized in the National Baseball Hall of Fame and Museum at Cooperstown, New York. After that, filmmaker Penny Marshall premiered her 1992 film A League of Their Own, a fictional history centered in the first season of the AAGPBL. Starring Geena Davis, Tom Hanks, Madonna, Lori Petty and Rosie O'Donnell, this film brought a rejuvenated interest to the extinct league.

== Early life ==
Born in Los Angeles, Thelma Eisen was one of four children born into the family of David Eisen, an Austrian immigrant, and Dorothy (Shechter) Eisen, from New York City. She grew up in an orthodox Jewish home playing softball and was already participating in the semi-professional level by age 14, starting with the Katzenjammer Kids, named so for their manager George Katzman, who was inspired by the popular comic strip of same name.

She attended Belmont High School and graduated from high school in 1941, and attended Santa Monica College part time. Eisen then went out to work to become one of the first Harvey Girls. An outstanding all-around athlete, at 18 she played in a short-lived professional football league for women in California as a fullback, but when Los Angeles city council banned tackle football for women, the team she played moved to Guadalajara, Jalisco. She later applied for work at the Bank of America in Los Angeles, which sponsored a softball team where she played. By then, she was noted by Bill Allington, a former ballplayer and advanced scout for the All-American Girls Professional Baseball League.

By 1944 the AAGPBL added two teams, the Milwaukee Chicks and the Minneapolis Millerettes. Eisen attended a tryout arranged by Allington, who would join the circuit for the upcoming season as manager of the Rockford team. She was one of six girls from Los Angeles who traveled to Peru, Indiana for the tryout. The girls passed the test and were rewarded with a contract to play in the league. Eisen joined the Chicks, along with Alma Ziegler, while Faye Dancer, Annabelle Lee, Lavonne Paire and Dorothy Wiltse were allocated to the Millerettes.

== AAGPBL career ==
In 1944 Eisen played outfield for the new team based in Milwaukee. The Chicks, managed by Max Carey, included in their roster remarkable players such as Josephine Kabick, Merle Keagle and Connie Wisniewski, among others. Eisen batted a modest .204 average in 107 games, driving in 41 runs while scoring 55 times, but stole 91 bases and provided stellar defense at outfield. The Chicks had the best overall record (70-45), after leading the league in runs scored (492), batting average (.207), stolen bases (739), and tying for first in home runs (12). The best offensive support came from Keagle, who hit .264 with 47 runs batted in, while topping the AAGPBL hitters in home runs (7) and total bases (145). The one-two pitching staff was led by Kabick, who posted a 26–19 record for a .578 winning percentage and led all pitchers in wins and innings pitched (366), while Wisniewski went 23-10 (.697) with a 2.23 earned run average. The Chicks then went on to win the Championship Title, beating the Kenosha Comets in the postseason. During the seven-game series Wisniewski went 4–1 with a 0.40 ERA in five complete games, including two shutouts, two one-run games and one two-run game, winning three of four matchups with Kenosha's Helen Nicol, who finished with a 17–11 mark (.607) and had led the league with a minuscule 0.93 ERA. Eisen hit .250 in the Series, including the only home run for her team.

By 1946 Eisen joined the expansion Peoria Redwings, stealing 128 bases for them while tying for the most triples (9) along with Racine's Eleanor Dapkus and Rockford's Rose Gacioch. She ranked ninth in average (.256), tenth in total bases (120), and finished second in stolen bases behind Racine's Sophie Kurys, who set a league single-season record with 201 steals in 203 attempts. Eisen garnered All-Star status in the process as the third outfielder behind South Bend's Elizabeth Mahon and Grand Rapids' Merle Keagle. In addition, she piloted the Redwings briefly to become the first female manager in AAGPBL history.

In 1947, AAGPBL teams flew from Miami, Florida to Havana, Cuba for spring training. All the teams stayed at the Seville Biltmore Hotel and were filmed for Fox Movietone News going down the steps at the University of Havana. At the time, the Brooklyn Dodgers trained in the Cuban capital because Jackie Robinson, who would be the first Afro-American to play in the Major Leagues, was training with the Dodgers for the first time. By then, city ordinances in Vero Beach, Florida, where the Dodgers normally trained, prevented blacks and whites players from competing on the same field against each other. Notably, newspaper stories from Havana indicate that the All-American girls drew larger crowds for their exhibition games at Estadio Latinoamericano than did the Dodgers. Eisen spent part of the year with Peoria, being dealt to Fort Wayne during the midseason in the same transaction that brought Faye Dancer to the Redwings. Eisen hit a combined .216 with 49 runs and 26 RBI in 111 games for both teams.

Eisen would spend the rest of her career with Fort Wayne. In 1948, she batted .220 with 67 runs and 30 RBI in a career-high 121 games, ending fourth in the league with 88 stolen bases. Fort Wayne, with Dick Bass at the helm, made the playoffs and defeated the Muskegon Lassies in the first round and Grand Rapids in the semi-finals, but was beaten by Rockford in the final series, four to one games. Eisen hit .316 in the finals, collecting six of the 20 hits of the Daisies, with the rest of the team hitting a measly .108.

In 1949, Eisen enjoyed the most memorable experience of her career while on an AAGPBL tour of Central and South America, as the teams were feted by both government officials and the common people. In Nicaragua, she visited the presidential palace and was greeted by the then President Anastasio Somoza. That year, she hit a low-career .184 in 109 games but belted three home runs to tie Grand Rapids' Inez Voyce and Kenosha's Audrey Wagner for the league lead.

By 1950 Eisen established career numbers in hits (103), runs (87) and doubles (20), while hitting a .238 average and 19 RBI in 106 games. She finished second in runs, third in doubles and tied for second in stolen bases (75). At this point, Fort Wayne, managed by Max Carey, ended second with a 62–43 mark and advanced to the playoffs. In the first round the Daisies defeated Grand Rapids, three to one games, but lost the final series to Rockford in the maximum seven games. In the first round, Eisen hit .500 (7-for-14) but slumped to .148 in the finals.

Eisen posted a .195 average in 1951, including a career-high 88 runs to tie for fourth place in the league. She also ranked third in doubles (17) and stolen bases (88), while appearing in 104 games. She then batted .300 (3-for-10) in the first round of the playoffs, as Fort Wayne fell to South Bend in three games.

In 1952, Eisen posted career-highs with a .265 average and 110 hits in 106 games for Fort Wayne, now managed by Jimmie Foxx. She also ranked second for the most runs scored with 77, only four behind teammate and league's leader Betty Foss. In addition, Eisen finished third in stolen bases (77) and tied for seventh in hits. The Daisies finished in first place with a 67–42 record and made the playoffs, but were swept in the first round by South Bend in two contests. Eisen went 4-for-13 (.308) in the playoffs, during what turned out to be her last AAGPBL season.

== Life after baseball ==
Following her AAGPBL career, Eisen settled in the Pacific Palisades area of Los Angeles, and starred in softball with the perennial champions Orange Lionettes until 1957.

In 1993 Eisen was elected to the board of directors of the AAGPBL Players Association, which established the aforementioned exhibition at the Hall of Fame, and raises funds for reunions and records the stories of players for the historic circuit. She also gained induction into the National Jewish Sports Hall of Fame and Museum in 2004. In 2006 she was inducted into the Southern California Jewish Sports Hall of Fame.

Eisen died at her home on May 11, 2014, on her 92nd birthday.

== Batting statistics ==
GP	AB	R	H	2B	3B	HR	RBI	SB	BB	SO	BA	OBP	SLG
966	3705	594	830	80	25	11	241	674	375	175	.224	.295	.268
