= Margaret Wigiser =

American baseball player (1924–2019)

- Center fielder
- Born: December 17, 1924; Brooklyn, New York, U.S.
- Died: January 19, 2019 (aged 94); Stuart, Florida, U.S.
- Batted: Right Threw: Right

Career statistics
- Batting average: .227
- Home runs: 4
- Runs batted in: 88

Teams
- Minneapolis Millerettes (1944); Rockford Peaches (1945–1946)

Career highlights and awards
- AAGPBL champion (1945)

Margaret M. "Wiggie" Wigiser (December 17, 1924 – January 19, 2019) was a center fielder who played from 1944 through 1946 in the All-American Girls Professional Baseball League (AAGPBL). She batted and threw right-handed.

== Overview profile ==
Wigiser was a center fielder for three seasons in the All-American Girls Professional Baseball League, including one year for the Championship Team. She also has been regarded as one of the earliest sluggers in the league, until a severe injury during a regular game shortened her playing career. After her playing days, she became an active participant in New York City public school sports, becoming a factor in persuading the New York School System to fund athletic programs for high school girls.

== Early life ==
A native of Brooklyn, New York, Wigiser was one of 25 players who made the All-American Girls Professional Baseball League clubs, hailed from New York City and State, including Muriel Bevis, Gloria Cordes, Mildred Deegan, Nancy Mudge and Betty Trezza. She was the daughter of Herman Wigiser, orthodox Jewish and Pauline (née Fabian) Wigiser, a Roman Catholic; her family is of Hungarian ancestry. At early age she started to play baseball for the temple team. In 1942 she graduated from Seward Park School, where she received the Underhill Certificate for outstanding athlete, recognizing her achievements in softball and track and field. She later attended college and joined the All-American Girls Professional Baseball League.

== AAGPBL career ==
Wigiser entered the AAGPBL in 1944 with the expansion Minneapolis Millerettes. The team ended with an overall record of 45–72, 26½ games out of first place. That year Wigiser belted the longest home run ever hit at Beyer Stadium, home of the Rockford Peaches. The blast must have impressed the Peaches' management, as they picked up her contract when the Millerettes folded at the end of the season. Wigiser exploded with Rockford in 1945, hitting .249 with two home runs, eight doubles and two triples, helping her team to clinch the Championship Title. The Peaches, with Bill Allington at the helm, enjoyed a 67–43 record and won the title after beating the Fort Wayne Daisies in the best-of-seven series. In 1946 Rockford placed in fourth place (60-52). Wigiser appeared in only 39 games for the team, after she tore a cartilage in her right knee and her playing career came to an end. She posted a lifetime batting average of .227 with four home runs and 88 runs batted in in 203 games.

== Life after baseball ==
Even before she started playing in the AAGPBL, Wigiser attended Hunter College. Following her baseball career, she received a Bachelor of Arts and Master of Arts degree and became an active participant in New York City public school sports, persuading the New York School System to fund athletic programs for high school girls. She worked as a physical education teacher from 1948 through 1969, directed the city's high school programs from 1969 to 1982, and helped pace the way for additional funding of girls sports. She is an honor member of the New York City PSAL (Public School Athletic League), the Hunter College Hall of Fame, and the Hunter College Alumni Association.

On November 5, 1988, Wigiser was honored with the rest of the All-American Girls Professional Baseball League during the opening of a permanent display at the Baseball Hall of Fame and Museum in Cooperstown, New York. In addition to this, the New York PSAL (Public School Athletic League) annually presents the Margaret Wigiser Award, named after her, to recognize the Outstanding Female student-athlete of the city. In 2006 Wigiser was placed on a "Jewish Major Leaguers, Inc" card, but this turned out to be an error as she informed them she identified as Catholic. As of 2015, Wigiser lived in Hobe Sound, Florida. Wigiser died on January 19, 2019, at the age of 94.
