= Connie Wisniewski =

- Pitcher / Outfielder
- Born: February 18, 1922; Detroit, Michigan, U.S.
- Died: May 4, 1995 (aged 73); Seminole, Florida, U.S.
- Batted: Left Threw: Right

debut
- 1944, for the Milwaukee Chicks

Last appearance
- 1952, for the Grand Rapids Chicks

Career statistics
- Win–loss record: 107–48
- Earned run average: 1.48
- Strikeouts: 266
- Batting average: .275
- Hits: 595
- Home runs: 7
- Runs batted in: 231
- Stolen bases: 185

Teams
- Milwaukee Chicks (1944); Grand Rapids Chicks (1945–1949, 1951–1952)

Career highlights and awards
- 4× AAGPBL All-Star Team (1946, 1948–1949, 1951); 2× AAGPBL champion (1944, 1947); AAGPBL Player of the Year Award (1945); All-time single-season record for wins (1946); 2× single season leader in earned run average (1945–1946); Single-season leader in home runs (1948)

Constance Wisniewski (February 18, 1922 – May 4, 1995) was a starting pitcher and outfielder who played from 1944 through 1952 in the All-American Girls Professional Baseball League (AAGPBL). Listed at 5' 8", 147 lb., she batted left-handed and threw right-handed. A player for eight seasons in the league, she made it onto the scene as a dominating pitcher, winning over 100 games in her first five years as an underhanded thrower, which included 32 wins with a 0.81 ERA and a league-record 391 innings in the 1945 season that saw her named the first ever winner of the league Player of the Year Award. She won 33 games the following year to tie Joanne Winter for what stood as a league record for the rest of the league's history. Her 40 complete games that year (tied with Helen Nicol) also stood as a league record. With the change to overhand pitching in 1948, she made her final pitching appearances while shifting to the outfield and became a dependable hitter. She left the team to play in the National Girls Baseball League in 1950 before returning to the Chicks in 1951, playing two further seasons before retiring in 1952.

== Overview profile ==
Connie Wisniewski has been considered by many historians as the best underhand pitcher of the All-American Girls Professional Baseball League. A model of consistency, in 1946 she completed all 40 of her starts and was named to the first of her four All-Star Teams. She averaged 26 wins in each of her first four seasons, including two with more than 30. In addition, she posted a 107-48 career record to become one of only seven pitchers to collect 100 or more victories in AAGPBL history, ranking behind Helen Nicol (163), Jean Faut (140), Joanne Winter (133), Dorothy Collins (117), Maxine Kline (116) and Nancy Warren (114). Wisniewski also holds the league's all-time record for best winning percentage (.690) and the best single-season record for innings pitched (391).

Wisniewski later switched to playing at outfield in 1948, in time to lead all 10 teams in total bases and in home runs, while finishing second in runs batted in and third in batting average. As a hitter, she ranks fifth in the all-time list with a .290 average, behind Joanne Weaver (.359), Betty Foss (.342), Jean Geissinger (.306) and Dorothy Kamenshek (.292). A much coveted player, she made $250 weekly and was even given a chauffeur to games. At the time, the league's salaries ranged from $55 to $125 and most of their players did not enjoy many privileges.

== Early life ==
A native of Detroit, Michigan, Wisniewski was one of six children born to Stanley Wisniewski and Frances Wisniewski. At the age of eleven she started to play softball in her home town. She later attended Detroit schools, graduating from the High School of Commerce. By then, Wisniewski developed the basic skills necessary to compete at a high level. She began playing against the greatest semi-professional softball players of Detroit in the late 1930s, and led the Hudson Motors team to the city championship. Although primarily an infielder Wisniewski became a pitcher in 1941. She quickly learned the fundamentals of the position, acquiring good mechanics, location and speed, the only way to pitch consistently with the minimum effort. She later developed an array of pitches, using a deceptive delivery and great movement with her pitches to keep opposing hitters off-balance and guessing at the batting's box.

By the time Wisniewski was nineteen years old she was pitching for the Detroit Keller Girls, a team who gained attention during the early days of World War II, which earned her a solid prestige and consideration in national softball circles. Wisniewski possessed a blazing fastball thrown with a windmill-like underhand pitching motion and speeds in the 90 miles per hour range. Then, an advancing scout of the All-American Girls Professional Baseball League grabbed her up as soon as he saw her pitching. She was invited to a try out and later was allocated to the Milwaukee Chicks, an expansion team managed by former big leaguer Max Carey.

== AAGPBL career ==
=== 1944 season ===
In 1944 Wisniewski joined the Milwaukee Chicks, a well-balanced squad that counted such talented players as Thelma Eisen, Merle Keagle, Betty Whiting and Alma Ziegler. The debuting Chicks led the league in runs scored (492), batting average (.207), and stolen bases (739) and tied for first in home runs (12). The best offensive support came from Keagle, who hit .264 with 47 RBI, led the league with 145 total bases, and set a new single-season record with seven home runs. In her rookie season Wisniewski posted a 23-10 record for a .697 winning percentage and collected a 2.23 earned run average (7th in the league), while striking out 49 batters and walking 47 in 36 pitching appearances.

The Chicks went 30-26 in the first half of the year, but dominated the second half (40-19) and had the best overall record (70-45). They then went on to win the Championship Title, beating the Kenosha Comets in the postseason. During the seven-game series Wisniewski went 4-1 with a 0.40 ERA in five complete games, including two shutouts, two one-run games and one two-run game, winning three of four matchups with Kenosha's Helen Nicol, who finished with a 17-11 mark (.607) and had led the league with a 0.93 ERA. Wisniewski lost Game 1 to Nicol and Kenosha, but rebounded in Game 3 to shut out the Comets and later won Game 4 against Nicol and the Comets by a 7–1 score. She started Game 6 with her team against the wall, 3 games to 2, and defeated Nicol in a 13-inning pitching-duel, 2–1, helping the Chicks to tie the series. In the decisive Game 7 Wisniewski shut out the Comets, 3–0, and beat Nicol again. Wisniewski set an all-time postseason record with four wins.

Although the Chicks won the championship, they had no local financial backing and could not compete with the American Association Milwaukee Brewers. In fact, the Chicks were forced to play all seven games of the series at Kenosha's Lake Front Stadium because the Brewers were using the Borchert Field in Milwaukee. In addition, the high ticket prices charged for AAGPBL games failed to encourage significant fan support. Due to lack of community support and skepticism of journalists, the Chicks moved to Grand Rapids, Michigan prior to the 1945 season.

=== 1945 season ===
First player to win the All-American Girls Professional Baseball League Player of the Year Award.

In 1945 Wisniewski became known as the Polish Rifle, in part due to her ethnic origins, and Iron Woman by her hard throwing pitches and endurance at the mound. She would fare even better in that season, helping the renamed Grand Rapids Chicks to reach the playoffs, setting league season-records for innings pitched (391) and ERA (0.81), and went 32-11 in 46 games to lead the league in victories. The rest of the Grand Rapids staff finished with a 28-39 record. She also struck out 82 batters and walked 61, and her 32 victories represented a single-season record.

Wisniewski pitched and won both ends of a doubleheader against the Racine Belles, but when she was not pitching she played and helped with the bat, hitting a .289 average with 70 runs and 66 RBI in 124 games. Then, in the first round of the playoffs she hurled one shutout against the Rockford Peaches but lost two pitching duels with Carolyn Morris, 1–0 and 2–0, and Rockford disposed of the Chicks three games to one. For her heroics she was named AAGPBL Player of the Year at the end of the season.

=== 1946 season ===
Wisniewski was honored by the publication Major League Baseball in 1946 after being selected by league managers as Player of the Year the previous season. She responded with a 33-9 record and a 0.96 ERA in 48 pitching appearances, striking out 79 batters while walking 59. She earned an All-Star Team selection and was selected Pitcher of the Year after leading the circuit in complete games (40), winning percentage (.786) and lowest ERA, though Racine's Sophie Kurys beat her out for Player of the Year honors. Kurys, who hit .286 with league-leads in on-base percentage (.434) and bases reached (215), also set all-time, single-season records with 201 stolen bases, 117 runs, 93 walks, and for fielding percentage at second base (.973). Wisniewski also broke her own all-time mark of victories, sharing the league lead with Joanne Winter (33-10), to set a record of 33 single-season wins that never would be matched again by any pitcher. Grand Rapids finished in second place with a 71-41 record, took revenge on Rockford three games to two in the first round of the playoffs, but lost the final round to the Belles, four to two. For once Wisniewski struggled in the playoffs, going 1-2 with a 1.73 ERA and earning one save. For the first time she was named to the All-Star Team.

=== 1947 season ===
In 1947, according to new regulations, the AAGPBL pitchers were forced to switch from underhand to sidearm. Such change adversely affected the performance of underhand pitchers, including Wisniewski. She made the transition, with no small effort, and went 16-14 (.533) with a 2.15 ERA in 32 games. She began to appear more regularly at right field, because Grand Rapids manager Johnny Rawlings decided to take advantage of her strong throwing arm and not waste her talent as a hitter. She responded with a .291 average, ending third in the league behind Rockford's Dorothy Kamenshek (.306) and Kenosha's Audrey Wagner, who lost the batting crown by a single point to Kamenshek. After a 65-47 record and another second-place finish, the Chicks defeated the South Bend Blue Sox in the first round of the playoffs, three to two games, and clinched the Championship Title over Racine through seven contests. Mildred Earp, who posted a 20-8 record with 192 strikeouts and a 0.68 ERA in the regular season, hurled a four-hit, 1–0 shutout in decisive Game 7 en route for the title. Wisniewski posted a 2-1 mark in the twelve postseason games and led her team with a .405 average (15-for-22).

=== 1948 season ===
The AAGPBL set a rule for a strictly overhand pitching in 1948. As an underhand pitcher, Wisniewski was unable to make the adjustment and thought she would have to leave the game. But her Grand Rapids manager Johnny Rawlings suggested she switch to outfield, and Wisniewski agreed. In her final year as a pitcher, she posted a 3-4 record with a 2.47 ERA in eight appearances, striking out 12 batters while walking 29. Then, she emerged as a top-notch hitter in the league after collect a .289 average, ending second behind the previous year's runner-up Wagner, who became the only girl to hit over .300 (.312). Wisniewski also led the circuit with seven home runs, posted a .385 on-base percentage with a .392 of slugging in 124 games, while ending second in runs batted in (66) and in doubles (20); third in total bases (172); fourth in hits (127), and tied for sixth in runs scored (70). She made her second All-Star Team, this time as an outfielder, completing one of the best individual seasons ever in AAGPBL history. The Chicks defeated South Bend in the first round of the playoffs in five games, but were swept by the Fort Wayne Daisies in the semi-finals after just three games.

=== 1949 season ===
Four-time All-Star Team as pitcher and outfielder.

Wisniewski continued to terrorize opposing pitchers throughout the 1949 season. She posted a solid .278 average, losing the batting crown to Muskegon Lassies' Doris Sams by one percentage point. Wisniewski also collected 113 hits, 64 runs, and 32 RBI, and amassed 140 total bases, even though she did not hit a home run. She was second in hits (one behind Sams), runs and total bases, ranking third in doubles (13) and tying for fifth in triples (7). In addition, she was selected for the All-Star Team. During the playoffs, the Chicks beat Fort Wayne (2-1) in the first round and lost to Rockford (3-1) in the semi-finals.

Nevertheless, Wisniewski wanted to pitch again and decided to jump to the rival National Girls Baseball League in the spring of 1950. Although it was billed as a baseball league, the NGBL featured underhand pitching and used a ball larger than that used in the AAGPBL. Wisniewski joined the Admiral Music Maids as a pitcher-outfielder, won 30 games during the regular season, but missed the AAGPBL. Eventually, she returned to the Chicks in time to start the 1951 AAGPBL season.

=== 1951 season ===
In 1951 Wisniewski entered her second stint with Grand Rapids and still put up respectable numbers. In 105 games, she hit a .326 average with a .401 on-base percentage, slugged .412, and finished third in the batting race behind Betty Foss (.368) and Dorothy Kamenshek (.345). She also tied for second in hits (126) and triples (9), was third in total bases (159), and ended seventh in runs (78) and doubles (15), while driving in 42 runs. For the fourth (and last) time of her career she joined the All-Star Team. In the playoffs, the Chicks lost to Rockford in the first round (2-0).

=== 1952 season ===
Wisniewski played her last AAGPBL season in 1952. Recognizing that she was slowing down after suffering a litany of injuries that affected her play, she opted to retire at the end of the year. She hit .267 with a .364 OBP in 105 games, including 96 hits, and had 35 stolen bases while scoring 64 runs and driving in 25 more. Wisniewski made her last playoff appearance for the Chicks, who were swept by South Bend in the first round (2-0).

The AAGPBL folded in 1954, yet it was not really a well-known fact until the 1992 film A League of Their Own, directed by Penny Marshall, which brought attention to many of the real AAGPBL players, who began to earn a rebirth of celebrity with the film's depiction of the first season of the circuit.

== Life after baseball ==
Connie Wisniewski is part of the AAGPBL permanent display at the Baseball Hall of Fame and Museum at Cooperstown, New York, opened in 1988, which is dedicated to the entire league rather than any individual player. Besides this, Wisniewski is highly regarded by fanatics, readers, and baseball enthusiasts as one of the best players in the 12-year history of the AAGPBL. She was diagnosed with stomach cancer in 1994. Following surgery, tests showed that it had spread to other organs. A year later, she died in her home of Seminole, Florida at the age of 73.

== Statistics ==
Pitching

ERA	GP	W	L	W-L%	IP	HA	RA	ER	BB	SO	WHIP	SO/BB
1.48	170	107	48	**.690**	1374	924	336	226	245	266	0.85	1.09

Bold denotes category leader.

Batting

BA	GP	AB	R	H	2B	3B	HR	RBI	SB	TB	BB	SO	OBP	SLG	OPS
.290	508	1780	295	517	70	25	7	189	168	658	253	133	.379	.370	.749
