= Mary Reynolds (baseball) =

American baseball player

- Third base/Pitcher/Manager
- Born: April 27, 1921; Gastonia, North Carolina, U.S.
- Died: May 9, 1991 (aged 70); Gastonia, North Carolina, U.S.
- Batted: Right Threw: Right

Teams
- Peoria Redwings (1946–1950)

Career highlights and awards
- All-Star Team (1947)

Mary Reynolds (April 27, 1921 – May 9, 1991) was an American utility who played from 1946 through 1950 in the All-American Girls Professional Baseball League (AAGPBL). She batted and threw right-handed.

Once selected to the All-Star team, Mary Reynolds was a solid defender at third base with good range on the field and a strong throwing arm. Reynolds also saw time in the outfield and as a starting pitcher, while hitting a career .223 batting average. Basically a line drive hitter, she put the ball in play and was extremely hard to strike out, averaging a 1.50 walk-to-strikeout ratio and a .317 on-base percentage during her five years in the circuit.

Born in Gastonia, North Carolina, Reynolds grew up with five brothers and three sisters. When World War II began, she served as a sheet metal worker.

Reynolds entered the league in 1946 with the Peoria Redwings, playing for them through the 1950 season. Nicknamed ″Windy″, because of her constant chatter on the field and from the dugout, she was chosen as the team's captain and eventually served as interim manager.

In 1947, Reynolds hit a career-best .245 average with a .935 fielding percentage at third base and earned a spot in the All-Star team. Her most productive season on the mound came in 1948, when she posted a 9–6 record and a 2.27 earned run average in 18 pitching appearances. She also was the best fielding pitcher in 1950 as she committed no errors.

Since 1988 Reynolds is part of Women in Baseball, a permanent display based at the Baseball Hall of Fame and Museum in Cooperstown, New York, which was unveiled to honor the entire All-American Girls Professional Baseball League rather than individual baseball personalities.

Mary Reynolds died in her hometown of Gastonia, North Carolina, at the age of 70.

== Career statistics ==
Batting

GP	AB	R	H	2B	3B	HR	RBI	SB	BB	SO	BA	OBP	SLG
426	1388	128	308	27	17	1	142	29	194	129	.222	.317	.268

Pitching

GP	W	L	W-L%	ERA	IP	H	RA	ER	BB	SO	WHIP	SO/BB
33	12	14	.441	2.85	221	194	91	70	53	106	1.12	2.00

Collective fielding

GP	PO	A	E	TC	DP	FA
338	501	433	66	1000	31	.934
