= Ruby Stephens =

- Pitcher
- Born: October 2, 1924; Clearwater, Florida, U.S.
- Died: March 21, 1996 (aged 71); Holiday, Florida, U.S.
- Batted: Right Threw: Right

Teams
- Racine Belles (1946); South Bend Blue Sox (1947); Springfield Sallies (1948); Kenosha Comets (1948–1951)

Career highlights and awards
- Pitched a no-hitter (1950)

Ruby Lee "Stevie" Stephens (October 2, 1924 – March 21, 1996) was a pitcher who played from 1946 through 1951 in the All-American Girls Professional Baseball League (AAGPBL). She batted and threw right-handed.

Stephens was born and grew up in Clearwater, Florida, where she worked as a ship welder and played softball in her spare time, until she was approached by a AAGPBL scout who had heard of her skills as a ballplayer. She attended a tryout camp and impressed the rest of the scouts, getting a contract to play in the upcoming season. She entered the league in 1946 with the Racine Belles, playing for them one year before joining the South Bend Blue Sox (1947), Springfield Sallies (1948[start]) and Kenosha Comets (1948[end]-1951). Her most productive season came in 1948, when she posted a 20–11 record with a 1.87 earned run average. She also hurled a no-hitter for Kenosha on July 12 of 1950.

In November 1988, the AAGPBL received its long overdue recognition when the Baseball Hall of Fame and Museum in Cooperstown, New York dedicated a permanent display to the entire league rather than any individual player.

Stephens died in Holiday, Florida, at the age of 71.

== Pitching statistics ==
GP	W	L	W-L%	ERA	IP
150	62	53	.539	2.35	961
