= Carolyn Morris =

- Pitcher
- Born: September 28, 1925; Phoenix, Arizona, U.S.
- Died: February 20, 1996 (aged 70); Mesa, Arizona, U.S.
- Batted: Right Threw: Right

Teams
- Rockford Peaches (1944–1946)

Career highlights and awards
- All-Star Team (1946); Championship team (1945); Perfect game (1945); Three no-hitters

Carolyn E. Morris (September 28, 1925 – February 20, 1996) was a female pitcher who played from 1944 through 1946 in the All-American Girls Professional Baseball League (AAGPBL). Listed at 5 ft 7 in (1.70 m), 157 lb., Morris batted and threw right-handed. She was nicknamed India by her teammates and close friends.

A hard-throwing, underhand pitcher, Carolyn Morris had a brief but relevant career in the AAGPBL. She hurled a perfect game, three no-hitters, twelve innings of no-hit ball in a final championship series, and averaged 26 wins in each of her three seasons in the circuit. In addition, she was a member of a championship team and earned an All-Star berth.

A native of Phoenix, Arizona, Morris was a smiling attractive brunette who pursued a modeling career before turning all of her attention to baseball. She started pitching fastball in grammar school, and stayed in school competition right up to and through high school. After that, she hurled in the Phoenix area in male teams. In addition, Morris was an accomplished musician and devoted to classical music. She entered the AAGPBL after graduating from school in 1944 and was allocated to the Rockford Peaches.

In 1944 Morris joined a Rockford team managed by Nap Kloza. The Peaches finished fourth in the first half of the year (28-32), but improved to third the second half (26-31) after collecting the fourth overall record (53-65) out of six teams. Morris gave a great contribution to the team, hurling two no-hitters and finishing with a 23–18 record for a .561 winning percentage in 44 pitching appearances. She struggled with her control, walking 133 batters while striking out 112 for a 0.84 strikeout-to-walk ratio.

Proving her rookie season was not a fluke, Morris excelled in 1945. Overall, she had a solid season, going 28–12 (.700) and improving her K/BB to a solid 2.16 (119-to-55). In addition, during the midseason she pitched a perfect game against the Fort Wayne Daisies. The Rockford team, now with Bill Allington at the helm, clinched first place in the regular season with a 67–43 record. In the first round of the playoffs, the Peaches disposed of the Grand Rapids Chicks, three to two games, with Morris winning 1–0 and 2–0 shutout decisions against stellar Connie Wisniewski and the Chicks. Then, in the final series Rockford beat the Daisies in five games, with Morris winning three of the four victories for her team.

But Morris was even better in her final season. In 1946, she posted a 29–13 record (.690 W%) with a 1.42 earned run average in 49 games, striking out 240 batters while walking only 98 (2.45 K/BB). Her numbers included a third no-hitter and career-highs in wins, strikeouts and ERA. Rockford finished in fourth place (60-52), advanced to the playoffs, and defeated the Grand Rapids Chicks in the first round, three to two games. In the final series against the Racine Belles, Morris pitched a no-hitter for nine innings in Game 6 and was not removed until the bottom of the twelfth inning. Belles pitcher Joanne Winter allowed thirteen hits, but Rockford could not put them together to produce a run. The scoreless game went into the bottom of fourteen, until Sophie Kurys of the Belles got a hit off reliever Mildred Deegan, stole second base, and, in the midst of stealing third, saw her teammate Betty Trezza hit the ball to right field. Kurys slid home to score the winning run and the Belles won the championship title. At the end of the season, Morris was selected for the All-Star Team.

Following her baseball career, Morris worked as a real estate broker and, relatedly, a notary public. She also became part of the AAGPBL permanent display at the Baseball Hall of Fame and Museum at Cooperstown, New York, opened in 1988, which is dedicated to the entire league rather than any individual player. She died in Mesa, Arizona at the age of 70.

== Pitching statistics ==
| GP | W | L | W-L% | ERA | IP | RA | ER | BB | SO | K/BB |
|---|---|---|---|---|---|---|---|---|---|---|
| 134 | 80 | 43 | .650 | 1.59 | 1005 | 266 | 178 | BB | SO | 1.65 |

== AAGPBL perfect games ==
| Pitcher(s) | Season | Team | Opponent |
|---|---|---|---|
| Annabelle Lee | 1944 | Minneapolis Millerettes | Kenosha Comets |
| Carolyn Morris | 1945 | Rockford Peaches | Fort Wayne Daisies |
| Doris Sams | 1947 | Muskegon Lassies | Fort Wayne Daisies |
| Jean Faut | 1951 | South Bend Blue Sox | Rockford Peaches |
| Jean Faut | 1953 | South Bend Blue Sox | Kalamazoo Lassies |
