= Dorothy Harrell =

- Shortstop
- Born: February 4, 1924; Los Angeles, California, U.S.
- Died: September 15, 2011 (aged 87); Cathedral City, California, U.S.
- Batted: Right Threw: Right

debut
- 1944

Last appearance
- 1952

Teams
- Rockford Peaches

Career highlights and awards
- Five-time All-Star Team (1947–1950, 1952); Four-time Championship team (1945, 1948–1950); Six play-off appearances (1945–1946, 1948–1950, 1952); Women in Baseball – AAGPBL Permanent Display at Baseball Hall of Fame and Museum (1988)

Dorothy Harrell (February 4, 1924 – September 15, 2011) was a shortstop who played in the All-American Girls Professional Baseball League (AAGPBL). Listed at 5 4", 127 lb., Harrell batted and threw right-handed. After being married she played under the name of Dorothy Doyle.

An All-Star Team member in five of her eight seasons, Dorothy Harrell was one of the premier shortstops of All-American Girls Professional Baseball League in its twelve years history. Harrell helped bring four championship titles to the Rockford Peaches, including back-to-back victories from 1947 to 1950, while leading her team in runs batted in several times. A classic slap hitter, she rarely tried to drive the ball and was able to put it in play very often, driving in a career 306 runs to rank 13th on the league's all-time list. Well respected for her keen eye for pitches, she garnered 203 walks and struck out only 95 times in 2,920 at-bats for a very solid 2.14 BB/K ratio.

A native of Los Angeles, California, Dorothy Harrell was nicknamed ″Snookie″ by her grandmother when she was born. She had an interesting bloodline. Her father, William D. Harrell, was of Irish, Scottish and Cherokee heritage, while her mother, Catherine Harrell, was of Welsh and German ancestry. She received encouragement early in her life from her mother, a huge baseball fan, who gave her a baseball glove and a uniform for Christmas when she was five years old. Harrell graduated from John C. Fremont High School and played organized softball in the Los Angeles area before marrying in 1943 Leonard Isbell. She remained married through 1946.

Harrell was discovered in 1944 by Bill Allington, former minor league player and then a coach in the California leagues, who was also an active scout for the All-American League. She attended a tryout and made an immediate impact on Allington and her future Peaches teammates. Allington eventually would be named manager for the team in the summer of that year as a replacement for Jack Kloza.

Entering her first season as the starting shortstop, Harrell was instrumental part of a solid and durable Rockford infield that included Dorothy Kamenshek at first base, Mildred Deegan at second and Alice Pollitt at third. After two losing seasons the Peaches led the circuit with a 67–43 record in 1945. During the playoffs, Rockford beat the Grand Rapids Chicks in the first round, three to one games, and defeated the Fort Wayne Daisies in the best-of-seven series, four to one games, behind a strong pitching effort from Carolyn Morris (3–0) and the opportune hitting of Kamenshek (6-for-21, .285, two RBI).

In 1946 Rockford finished in fourth place (60-52) and disposed of Grand Rapids in the first round, three-to-two games, but lost the finals to the Racine Belles in six games. In the final contest, which ended with a score of 1–0, Morris hurled a no-hitter for nine innings but lost her gem because Rockford failed to score. She was not removed until the bottom of the twelfth inning. On the other hand, Racine ace Joanne Winter won her fourth game of the playoffs (third against Rockford), despite allowing 19 base runners. The scoreless game went into the bottom of fourteen, when Sophie Kurys hit a single off reliever Mildred Deegan; stole second base, and, in the midst of stealing third, saw her teammate Betty Trezza hit a single to right field. Kurys tagged and slid at home plate for the only run of the game.

Dorothy Harrell, acrobatic All-Star shortstop for the Rockford Peaches, one of the top players in AAGPBL history, who served as an inspiration for the 1992 film A League of Their Own. Photo Credit: Bettmann/CORBIS.

Harrell earned her first All-Star selection in 1947. Starting that year, she led her team in runs batted during four consecutive seasons, batting a career-high .271 average in 1950, and joining the All-Star squad from 1948 to 1950. Rockford returned to the playoffs in 1948, to start a string of three straight championships.

In 1948 Rockford beat Fort Wayne Daisies in the best-of-seven series, four to one games. Helen Nicol won all four playoff games she pitched, including the finale in the championship against Maxine Kline, by a 4–2 score. Throughout the finals Harrell was the best hitter, leading all players with a .432 average (7-for-17).

In 1949, Harrell married David Doyle and played the rest of her career under her married name, Dorothy Doyle. Her husband died in 1963, and she never remarried.

Meanwhile, Rockford continued their torrid pace in 1949, sweeping their longtime rival South Bend Blue Sox in the best-of-seven final series. The defending champion Peaches won again in 1950, this time beating Fort Wayne in the maximum seven games. Notably, the Peaches and the Blue Sox were the only original teams to be active through the 12 years of existence of the circuit. South Bend would break the championship run of Rockford in 1951. In 58 postseason games, Dorothy batted an average of .281 (61-for-217) with four doubles, two triples and 15 stolen bases, driving in 21 runs while scoring 18 times.

In 1951 Dorothy played with the Phoenix A-1 Queens in an Arizona independent league. She rejoined the Peaches in 1952, earning her fifth All-Star berth during what turned out to be her last AAGPBL season. After that she returned to the Queens for the 1953 and 1954 seasons, and also played for the Orange Linoettes fastpitch softball team of California from 1956 to 1960, participating in Major National Tournaments.

Harrell graduated from Long Beach State University in 1958, earning her bachelor's degree after earning an associate degree from El Camino Junior College. Following her baseball retirement, she taught mathematics and worked as counselor and physical education teacher at Compton Unified School District in the Los Angeles area, retiring in 1984 after 26 years of service.

After retiring, she joined the Golden Diamonds Girls, a group of former AAGPBL players who made frequent appearances at reunions, card shows and sign autographs. She also became an avid golfer and remained close friends with her infield teammates Deegan, Kamenshek and Pollitt.

Since 1988 she is part of Women in Baseball, a permanent display based at the Baseball Hall of Fame and Museum. She was a longtime resident of Cathedral City, California, where she died at the age of 87.

== Career statistics ==
Batting

| GP | AB | R | H | 2B | 3B | HR | RBI | SB | TB | BB | SO | BA | OBP | SLG |
|---|---|---|---|---|---|---|---|---|---|---|---|---|---|---|
| 799 | 2922 | 326 | 667 | 56 | 37 | 9 | 306 | 229 | 824 | 203 | 95 | .228 | .278 | .282 |

Fielding

| GP | PO | A | E | TC | DP | FA |
|---|---|---|---|---|---|---|
| 792 | 1620 | 2148 | 337 | 4105 | 179 | .918 |
