= Bubber Jonnard =

American baseball player (1897–1977)

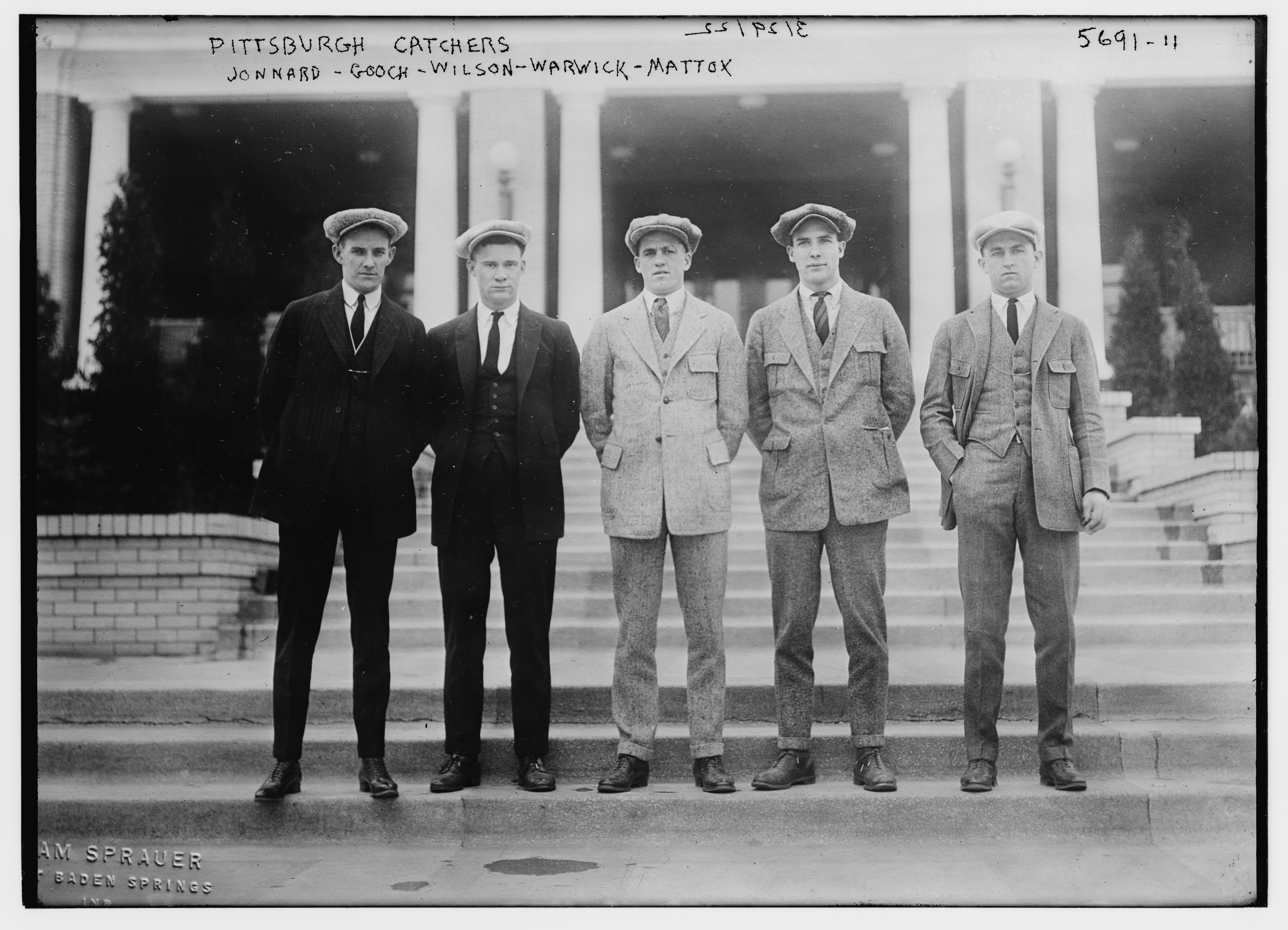
- Bubber Jonnard is pictured on the left
- Catcher
- Born: November 23, 1897; Nashville, Tennessee, U.S.
- Died: August 23, 1977 (aged 79); New York City, New York, U.S.
- Batted: Right Threw: Right

MLB debut
- October 1, 1920, for the Chicago White Sox

Last MLB appearance
- May 13, 1935, for the Philadelphia Phillies

MLB statistics
- Batting average: .230
- Home runs: 0
- Runs batted in: 20
- Stats at Baseball Reference

Teams
- Chicago White Sox (1920); Pittsburgh Pirates (1922); Philadelphia Phillies (1926–1927), (1935); St. Louis Cardinals (1929)

Clarence James "Bubber" Jonnard (November 23, 1897 – August 12, 1977) was an American Major League Baseball catcher. He played for the Chicago White Sox in 1920, the Pittsburgh Pirates in 1922, the Philadelphia Phillies in 1926, 1927 and 1935, and the St. Louis Cardinals in 1929. He played 103 Major League games with 235 at bats, 54 hits, no home runs and 20 RBIs. His lifetime batting average was .230, with a .267 on-base percentage and a .268 slugging percentage. As a fielder, he caught 86 games with a fielding percentage of .960. On December 13, 1927, he was part of a trade in which the Phillies received pitcher Jimmy Ring and catcher Johnny Schulte from the Cardinals in exchange for Jonnard, infielder Jimmy Cooney and outfielder Johnny Mokan.

He served as a coach for the Phillies in 1935 and the New York Giants from 1942 to 1946. He also served as a scout for the Giants, Kansas City Athletics, Baltimore Orioles and New York Mets. Players he signed as Mets' scout included Ed Kranepool, Nino Espinosa, Mike Jorgensen, Ken Singleton and Leroy Stanton.

He played for several minor league teams, including the San Antonio Bronchos, Norfolk Mary Janes, Nashville Volunteers, Wichita Falls Spudders, Houston Buffaloes, Rochester Red Wings, Jersey City Skeeters, Dallas Steers and Fort Worth Cats. In all, he played 987 minor league games with a batting average of .252 and 18 home runs. He managed the minor league Dallas Steers as a player-manager in 1933 and he managed the Milford Giants in 1940. He has also been incorrectly identified as the manager of the Minneapolis Millerettes of the All-American Girls Professional Baseball League during the 1944 season. The Millerettes' manager was Clarence's brother Claude, who also was nicknamed Bubber.

Jonnard was born on November 23, 1897, in Nashville, Tennessee. His twin brother Claude Jonnard was a Major League pitcher for the New York Giants, St. Louis Browns and Chicago Cubs between 1921 and 1929. Bubber and Claude were teammates on the Nashville Volunteers in 1920 and 1921, where the twin brothers formed the team's battery. He died at the age of 79 on August 12, 1977, in New York City. He is buried in Dallas, Texas.
