= Shaughnessy playoff system =

Sports tournament format

The Shaughnessy playoff system is a method of determining the champion of a sports league that is not in a divisional alignment.

The system involves the participation of the top four teams in the league standings in a single elimination tournament to determine the championship. The first round of the playoffs could involve the pairing of the first- and fourth-place teams in one contest (whether it be a single game or a series of games) and the second- and third-place teams in the other, or the first- and third-place teams in one semifinal round and the second- and fourth-place teams in the other – either is considered a variant of the Shaughnessy system. In either case, the semifinal winners would then compete for the league championship.

== History and usage ==
=== North America ===
The Shaughnessy playoff system was first used in 1933, having been implemented by and named after Frank Shaughnessy, the general manager of the Montreal Royals minor league baseball team of the International League. After its successful implementation by the International League, the popularity of the new postseason format spread to other baseball leagues, including to the Texas League in 1933 and to the Western Baseball League, Evangeline League, and Southern Association in 1935.

Shaughnessy had proposed his system and several others as a means of maintaining public interest deeper into the baseball season, since when the championship was decided on win–loss record alone, public interest tended to decrease once a winner was clear. At the time in baseball and other sports within the United States of America, playoffs were uncommon except to determine a champion between the winners of different divisions; but playoffs among teams from the same division had been adopted in the National Hockey League. Based on what he had seen in the NHL, Shaughnessy proposed three different systems before the one which now bears his name was adopted.

In the 1940s, the Shaughnessy system spread to other sports. The All-America Football Conference, which used the Shaughnessy playoff system in 1949, the last season of the league's existence, and the American Association minor American football league used the format in five of its championship seasons during that decade.

In the Original Six era of the National Hockey League (1942–1967), the circuit adopted a Shaughnessy playoff system (first place vs. third place and second place vs. fourth place) in which the paired teams played in a best-four-of-seven-games series with the winners advancing to the Stanley Cup championship round.

In NCAA college basketball, one Division I conference uses a Shaughnessy playoff for its postseason tournaments for men and women. The Ivy League launched postseason tournaments for both sexes in the 2016–17 season; the top four teams in the regular-season conference standings advance to a Shaughnessy tournament (also using 1–4 and 2–3 semifinal pairings) at a predetermined site. The winners receive the Ivies' automatic berths in the NCAA men's and women's tournaments.

=== Europe ===
More recently, the Shaughnessy playoff system has been adopted outside of North America. In English rugby union, the format is currently used to determine the winner of the Premiership, and from 2012–13 through to 2016–17 was also used in the second-level RFU Championship to determine the team to be promoted to the Premiership. The Premiership and Championship formats differ only in the number of games contested—the Premiership playoff uses one-off matches, while all matches in the Championship playoff were two-legged. The Premier 15s, launched in autumn 2017 as the new top flight of English women's rugby, uses the same playoff format as the Premiership. The Celtic League in Ireland, Scotland and Wales, now known as the United Rugby Championship, adopted a system identical to that of the Premiership starting in 2009–10, the season before that league expanded to include two teams from Italy. The Shaughnessy system was replaced by a six-team playoff when two South African sides joined the league in 2017–18, bringing it to its 14-team roster; it has since expanded to 16 teams.

In French rugby union, a Shaughnessy-style playoff was used to determine the second of two promotion spots in the second-tier Rugby Pro D2 through the 2016–17 season, with the teams involved being the second- through fifth-placed teams, as the first-place team earned automatic promotion to the Top 14. This system has been abandoned for 2017–18 and beyond in favor of a six-team playoff system identical to that currently used in the Top 14, with only the Pro D2 champion earning automatic promotion and the runner-up advancing to a promotion/relegation playoff with the second-from-bottom Top 14 side. Previously, the pure Shaughnessy system had been used to determine the Top 14 champion, but that league's playoffs expanded to six teams starting in 2009–10.

The Super League in rugby league, made up primarily of English sides with one from France, adopted a Shaughnessy playoff beginning in 2015. This follows a 22-match home-and-away league season and a single round-robin mini-league involving the top eight clubs from the home-and-away season. In addition, the second-level Championship adopted a Shaughnessy playoff for its Championship Shield, and the third-level League 1 adopted a Shaughnessy-style promotion playoff similar to that formerly used by Rugby Pro D2. In the Championship, the bottom eight teams at the end of the league season enter their own single round-robin mini-league, with the top four teams at the end of that phase entering a Shaughnessy playoff for the Shield. In League 1, the top team at the end of the league season is automatically promoted to the following season's Championship. The second- through fifth-place teams then enter a Shaughnessy-style playoff for the second promotion place.

Some association football leagues use Shaughnessy-style playoffs for promotion purposes. Among the countries using such a system are:

- England:
  - EFL Championship: Top two teams automatically promoted to the Premier League; next four teams play off for the final promotion place.
  - EFL League One: Top two teams automatically promoted to the Championship; next four teams play off for the final promotion place.
  - EFL League Two: Top three teams automatically promoted to League One; next four teams play off for the final promotion place.
  - National League: Champion automatically promoted to League Two; next four teams play off for the final promotion place.
  - National League North and National League South: Each champion automatically promoted to the National League; next four teams in each division play off for that division's second promotion place.
- Spain:
  - Segunda División: Top two teams automatically promoted to La Liga; next four teams play off for the final promotion place. Reserve teams of La Liga clubs are barred from promotion; if any such side occupies a promotion or playoff spot, it is excluded and its place is taken by the next-best team in the standings that is not barred. The same scenario also applies if a reserve team's parent club is relegated from La Liga (with the reserve team being relegated to Segunda División B in this case).

=== Southern hemisphere ===
In rugby union, the Shaughnessy system has been widely used throughout the SANZAAR countries of South Africa, New Zealand, Australia and Argentina.

The Super Rugby competition, initially featuring teams from Australia, New Zealand and South Africa, used the Shaughnessy format throughout its history as the Super 12 and Super 14, ending in 2010. The competition's expansion to 15 teams as Super Rugby in 2011 saw the playoffs expand to six teams, with three conference champions and three "wild cards" advancing. With the addition of three more teams in 2016 (with two of the new entries in Argentina and Japan), the playoffs now involve eight teams, with four conference champions and four "wild cards". The format was discontinued in the Super Rugby competition for the 2017 season.

In South Africa, the Currie Cup uses a Shaughnessy playoff to determine the champions of both of its divisions (Premier and First).

In New Zealand, the professional Mitre 10 Cup (formerly Air New Zealand Cup and ITM Cup) adopted the Shaughnessy format in 2009, after having used an eight-team playoff bracket in its first two seasons in 2007 and 2008. In 2011, the then-ITM Cup split into two divisions, effectively re-creating the three-division system that existed in the National Provincial Championship era. The playoffs in both the Premiership and Championship divisions use the Shaughnessy system except in World Cup years, in which only the top two teams contest a final. Since its inception in 2007, the amateur Heartland Championship has used the Shaughnessy system, implemented at the last group stage, to determine the winners of both of its trophies, the Meads and Lochore Cups.

Australia's National Rugby Championship, which began play in 2014, uses a Shaughnessy playoff. The country's previous attempt to establish a national league, the Australian Rugby Championship, also used a Shaughnessy playoff, but was scrapped after its only season in 2007.

=== Philippines ===
A modified Shaughnessy system has been used by the University Athletic Association of the Philippines for its basketball tournaments since 1993. In the semifinals with a #1 vs. #4 and #2 vs. #3 match-ups, the top two seeds possessing the twice to beat advantage, a variant of the best of three series where the higher seed has 1–0 series lead. The winners advance to the best of three finals; it has never been referred to as the "Shaughnessy system" in the country. The National Collegiate Athletic Association (NCAA) adopted it for their basketball tournaments starting in 1998. It has since been adopted to other sports by other collegiate leagues, and in the Philippine Basketball Association, since then

== Example ==
As it was used in the playoffs of the 2008–09 Guinness Premiership:

Semi-finals
1	Leicester Tigers	24
4	Bath	10
2	Harlequins	0
3	London Irish	17

Final
1	Leicester Tigers	10
3	London Irish	9

=== Semi-finals ===
2009-05-09
15:00

Leicester Tigers	24–10	Bath
Try: Hipkiss 17' c Vesty 38' c Moody 69' c Con: Dupuy (3/3); Pen: Dupuy 51'	Report	Try: Claassens 46' m Hooper 57' m

Walkers Stadium, Leicester
Attendance: 18,850

2009-05-09
17:30

Harlequins	0–17	London Irish
	Report	Try: Hudson 52' c Catt 75' c Con: D. Armitage (2/2); Pen: D. Armitage 43'

Twickenham Stoop, London
Attendance: 12,638

=== Final ===
2009-05-16
17:30

Leicester Tigers	10–9	London Irish
Try: Crane 61' c Con: Dupuy (1/1); Pen: Dupuy	Report	Pen: D. Armitage (2); Drop: Hewat

Twickenham, London
Attendance: 81,601
Referee: Wayne Barnes
