= Dorothy Kamenshek =

American baseball player (1925–2010)

- First base
- Born: December 21, 1925; Norwood, Ohio, U.S.
- Died: May 17, 2010 (aged 84); Palm Desert, California, U.S.
- Batted: Left Threw: Left

Career statistics
- Batting average: .292
- Hits: 1,090
- Home runs: 13
- Runs batted in: 304
- Stolen bases: 657

Teams
- Rockford Peaches (1943–1951, 1953)

Career highlights and awards
- 4× AAGPBL champion (1945, 1948, 1949, 1950); 7× AAGPBL All-Star Team (1943, 1946–1951); 2× AAGPBL batting champion (1946, 1947); AAGPBL records: 1,090 career hits; 1,300 career total bases

Dorothy Kamenshek (December 21, 1925 – May 17, 2010), nicknamed "Dottie" and "Kammie", was an American All-American Girls Professional Baseball League player. She batted and threw left-handed.

One of the best fielders in the AAGPBL era, Kamenshek won the batting title twice and served as a key part of four league champion teams for Rockford from 1945 to 1950. She was named to the league All-Star Team seven times, a record for all players. She holds the league record for hits and total bases for a career.

== Early life ==
A native of Norwood, Ohio, Kamenshek played outfield for a local softball league, and at the age of 17 she was spotted by a scout from the All-American Girls Professional Baseball League. After tryouts at Wrigley Field in Chicago, she joined the Rockford Peaches as an outfielder when the league began in 1943, but was soon playing first base. She and shortstop Snooky Harrell formed the league's best double-play combination.

Kamenshek played in the AAGPBL for 10 seasons, and was selected as an All-Star all seven times the league established such a team. In 1946 she was the league's top batter with an average of .316 (a single point ahead of Audrey Wagner), and won the distinction again in 1947 with an average of .306. She struck out only 81 times in 3,736 at-bat appearances.

Considered one of the best athletes of her time, southpaw Kamenshek was recruited by a men's team from Fort Lauderdale, Florida. She believed the team only wanted her for publicity and turned down the offer. Former New York Yankee Wally Pipp said she was the most accomplished player he had ever seen among men or women.

In the off‑seasons, Kamenshek studied physical education and health education at the University of Cincinnati. In 1951, back injuries reduced her playing time, and after the 1952 season she retired from the game with a career average of .292.

== Education ==
In 1958, Kamenshek received a degree in physical therapy from Marquette University in Milwaukee. She returned to Ohio to serve as a physical therapist in Hamilton County and later moved to Los Angeles to perform the same work at the Los Angeles Crippled Children's Services Department. In 1964, she was promoted to supervisor of physical and occupational therapy for Los Angeles County Children's Services, and later to chief of therapy services, the position she held when she retired in 1980.

== Legacy ==
After her retirement, Kamenshek was honored by Los Angeles County with the Outstanding Management Award (1980). She is part of the AAGPBL permanent display, opened in 1988 at the Baseball Hall of Fame and Museum at Cooperstown, New York.

The 1992 film A League of Their Own introduced a new generation to the history of women's baseball. Geena Davis played Dottie Hinson, the best ballplayer in the league, a character loosely based on Kamenshek.

In 1999, Sports Illustrated for Women selected Kamenshek as the 100th-greatest female athlete of the 20th century.

== Death ==
Kamenshek died on May 17, 2010, at the age of 84. She was buried at Forest Lawn Cemetery in Cathedral City, California. Her spouse and fellow AAGPBL player Margaret Wenzell, was buried next to her in 2014.

== Career statistics ==
Batting

GP	AB	R	H	2B	3B	HR	RBI	SB	TB	BB	SO	BA	OBP	SLG	OPS
1012	3736	667	**1090**	89	41	13	304	657	**1300**	492	110	.292	.374	.348	.722

Bold denotes category leader.

== Biographies ==
- Kammie on First (2014, Ohio University Press), a biography for middle-school children by Michelle Houts.

== Sources ==
- Gregorich, Barbara (1993). Women at Play: The Story of Women in Baseball. Harcourt Brace and Company. pp. 90–95. ISBN 9780156982979.
- A Whole New Ball Game: The Story of the All-American Girls Professional Baseball League, by Sue Macy

== See also ==
- Dorothy Ferguson
