= Audrey Wagner =

- Center field / Right field
- Born: December 27, 1927; Bensenville, Illinois, U.S.
- Died: August 31, 1984 (aged 56); Rock Springs, Wyoming, U.S.
- Batted: Right Threw: Right

Career statistics
- Batting average: .254
- Home runs: 29
- Runs batted in: 281

Teams
- Kenosha Comets

Career highlights and awards
- Player of the Year Award (1948); 2× All-Star (1947–1948); AAGPBL batting champion (1948); 3× AAGPBL home runs leader (1946–1947, 1949); AAGPBL runs batted in leader (1948)

Genevieve "Audrey" Wagner (December 27, 1927 – August 31, 1984) was an outfielder who played from 1943 through 1949 in the All-American Girls Professional Baseball League (AAGPBL). Listed at 5 ft 7 in (1.70 m), 145 lb., she batted and threw right-handed.

== Brief profile ==
Audrey Wagner was one of the sixty original founding members of the All-American Girls Professional Baseball League. A two-time member of the All-Star Team, she ranks eight in the all-time list with 29 career home runs while her 55 triples rank second all-time to Eleanor Callow (60). Wagner earned Player of the Year honors in 1948, and also led several offensive categories over her seven-year career in the league. She later became an All Star outfielder in each of her four seasons in the competing National Girls Baseball League of Chicago. Following her baseball career, she graduated as Doctor of Medicine.

== Early life ==
Wagner was born and grew up in Bensenville, Illinois, and began to play sandlot ball with the boys of her neighborhood when she was a little girl. At age 15, she attended Bensenville Community High School, where she heard about Philip K. Wrigley and his remarkable experiment in creating a women's professional baseball league during World War II. Wrigley, who was in charge both of the Wrigley Company and the Chicago Cubs Major League Baseball club, decided to found the All-American Girls Professional Baseball League as a promotional sideline to maintain interest in baseball. By then, the military draft was depleting Major League rosters of first-line players and attendance declined at ballparks around the country. The league started its first season in 1943 with the teams Kenosha Comets, Racine Belles, Rockford Peaches and South Bend Blue Sox, and each team was made up of fifteen girls. Wagner was allocated to the Kenosha Comets, where she played her entire career in the circuit.

== AAGPBL career ==
Due to her studies at school, Wagner saw limited action until the school year ended, be it high school or college. Audrey insisted on finishing the school year before playing full-time. She entered the AAGPBL as a pitcher, but Comets manager Josh Billings promptly moved her to the outfield because of her hitting abilities. She moved around center and right field.

In 1943 Wagner hit .230 in 73 games, scoring 30 runs while driving in 27 more. She tied for second in triples (10) and tied for third in home runs (4). She also appeared in the league's first All-Star Game during the midseason. The Comets had the third-best record at 56–52, but had won the second-half title, earning them a berth in the playoffs, only to be swept in three games by Racine. Helen Nicol, who led the AAGPBL pitchers in wins (31), strikeouts (220), ERA (1.81) and shutouts (eight), inexplicably failed in the playoffs after going 0–2 with a 4.50 ERA.

Wagner dropped to .189 with 26 RBI in 1944, but still managing to score 30 runs in 90 games. It was the only time in her AAGPBL career in which she failed to hit a home run. The Comets again placed third (62–54) and made the playoffs after win the first half. They took a 3–2 lead over the expansion Milwaukee Chicks in the Championship Series, but Nicol lost an 11-inning pitching duel with Connie Wisniewski in Game 7.

Wagner rebounded slightly in 1945, batting .198 with 26 runs and 26 RBI, but she led the league with nine triples and tied for second in home runs (two) in a dominant pitching league. After becoming a full-time player in 1946, she improved her offensive statistics by hitting a .281 average and leading the league with nine home runs and a .413 slugging average. She also led in total bases (162) and tied for the doubles lead (15), ending fourth in hits (110) and eighth in RBI (53), while her average ranked fifth. The Comets were out of contention in both years.

In 1947 the AAGPBL moved its spring training camp to Havana, Cuba. Wagner did not make the trip as school was still in session. That season she batted a solid .305 of average and again led the circuit in home runs (7), doubles (25), total bases (183) and slugging (.469). She also topped all hitters in RBI (53) and hits (119) and ended second in triples (9). Wagner, who lost the batting crown by a single point to Dorothy Kamenshek, was named to the All-Star Team, while Kenosha did not qualify for the playoffs this time.

Wagner's hitting stayed about the same in 1948, which was good enough to win the batting title win a .312 average and by leading all-hitters with 130 hits, all career-highs. Besides this, Wagner led all outfielders with a perfect 1.000 fielding average. She also posted career-numbers in games played (117), runs (70), RBI (56), on-base percentage (.393), walks (56) and triples (14, one behind Eleanor Callow), and was the only girl to hit over .300 in that season, ending 23 points ahead of runner-up Connie Wisniewski. In addition, Wagner tied for fourth in homers (4) and tied for eight in RBI, while hitting a hefty .446 of slugging. She earned the Player of the Year Award and again made the All-Star Team. The other two All-Star outfielders were Racine's Edythe Perlick, who averaged .243 with two home runs and 51 RBI, and Grand Rapids' Wisniewski, who hit .289 with seven homers and 66 RBI. Meanwhile, the Comets advanced to the playoffs but were beaten by Rockford in the first round.

In 1949 Wagner slipped to .233 with 28 runs and 40 RBI in 97 games, but she hit three homers to tie Thelma Eisen and Inez Voyce for the league lead, giving her three home run titles. For the second consecutive year the Comets gained a playoff berth and were defeated in the start, this time by the expansion Muskegon Lassies.

== NGBL career ==
Wagner moved to the Parichy Bloomer Girls of the National Girls Baseball League (NGBL) in 1950, because she was offered a higher salary, a signing bonus and no extensive travelling. Audrey only contemplated moving to the NGBL due to a disagreement with management. Additionally, the games were played in the Chicago area, so she would be home every night closer to school and her studies. Whereas the AAGPBL gradually evolved from softball to an almost standard hardball, with longer bases and sidearm or overhand pitching, the NGBL used a ball larger than that used in the AAGPBL, featured the traditional underhand pitching and base paths stayed shorter.

From 1950 through 1953 Wagner continued to be a solid hitter and outfielder. She helped her team to clinch the Championship Title in 1950 and made the All-Star Team in each of her four seasons in the NGBL. Her most productive season came in 1952, when she led the circuit in doubles, triples, home runs and total bases, ending second in the batting crown race with a .364 average.

== Life after baseball ==
While playing baseball, Wagner attended Elmhurst College and the University of Illinois where she earned her Doctor of Medicine degree. Following her graduation, she worked as a practicing obstetrician and gynecologist in California.

Audrey Wagner died in a small plane accident near Rock Springs, Wyoming, at the age of 56. She is part of the AAGPBL permanent display at the Baseball Hall of Fame and Museum at Cooperstown, New York opened in 1988, which is dedicated to the entire league rather than any individual player. She was inducted posthumously in the Elmhurst's Bluejay Backer Hall of Fame (Class of 1950) in 2003 and in the Fenton High School Alumni Wall of Fame (Class of 1945) in 2005.
