= Millie Deegan =

Mildred Deegan
- Pitcher / Outfield / Second base
- Born: December 11, 1919; Brooklyn, New York, U.S.
- Died: July 21, 2002 (aged 82); New Port Richey, Florida, U.S.
- Batted: Right Threw: Right

Teams
- Rockford Peaches (1943–1947); Kenosha Comets (1947–1948); Springfield Sallies (1948); Fort Wayne Daisies (1949–1951); Peoria Redwings (1951); Rockford Peaches (1952)

Career highlights and awards
- Championship team (1945); Four postseason appearances (1945–1946, 1949–1950); Women in Baseball – AAGPBL Permanent Display at Baseball Hall of Fame and Museum (1988)

Mildred Eleanor Deegan (December 11, 1919 – July 21, 2002) was an American pitcher, outfielder and second basewoman who played ten seasons in the All-American Girls Professional Baseball League, from 1943 to 1952.

== Background ==
Deegan was one of 25 players who made the All-American Girls Professional Baseball League clubs and hailed from New York City and State, including Muriel Bevis, Gloria Cordes, Nancy Mudge, Betty Trezza and Margaret Wigiser. Born in Bensonhurst, Brooklyn, she was a star athlete at Abraham Lincoln High School and in 1935 was the "champion woman baseball thrower" in New York City. "Mildred Eleanor Deegan was born on Dec. 11, 1919, in the Brooklyn neighborhood of Bensonhurst.... She excelled in track and field at Lincoln High School, and after graduation played amateur softball with a team called the Americanettes." She learned baseball from her father, coach of the Brooklyn Bloomer Girls team. As a teenager she placed second behind Babe Didrikson Zaharias in the javelin throw in the national meet before the 1936 Summer Olympics. However, at 16 she was too young to compete in the Olympics. Later, she played fastpitch softball for the New York Americanettes in 1938–39. In 1939 her batting average was .406. That year she was the guest of New York City Mayor Fiorello La Guardia (along with other celebrities) at the opening day of the New York World's Fair. She played later with the Manhattan Beach Girls, who competed in the Metropolitan League in Madison Square Garden. Deegan hit a 250-foot home run inside the building. Babe Ruth, the only other player ever to hit a home run inside the Garden, was in attendance, and posed for a photograph with her, squeezing her biceps. Then, she gained the nickname of "the Babe Ruth of Women's Softball".

== Professional career ==
Deegan joined a Chicago fastpitch softball team for the American Softball Association National Tournament in 1943. She was soon signed by the league to play for the Rockford Peaches. She played for the Peaches until midway through the 1947 season, when she was traded to the Kenosha Comets, beginning a four-year stretch in which she played for six teams. In 1948 Deegan was with the Comets and Springfield Sallies, and from 1949 through part of the 1951 season she played with the Fort Wayne Daisies. She finished the season with the Peoria Redwings before ending her career in 1952, returning to the Rockford franchise. Her managers and coaches included former big-leaguers Max Carey, Jimmie Foxx, Bill Wambsganss and Marty McManus. Deegan also worked as the league's official photographer.

As a pitcher, she gave up the winning run to the Racine Belles in the final game of the 1946 Shaughnessy series but had a lifetime earned run average of 2.36. Her career batting average was .260.

In 1944, the Brooklyn Dodgers brought Deegan and two other women players to the team's spring training camp at Bear Mountain, New York. She was given permission to travel with the team from manager Leo Durocher but was not allowed to step on the field. However, after retrieving a foul ball during an exhibition game, one of the coaches gave her a fungo bat and let her bat infield practice. Durocher was quoted as saying that "...if we run out of men, Millie will be the first on the team...if she were a man, she no doubt would have been a Dodger."

== Retirement ==
After retiring from baseball Deegan worked as a commercial photographer in Miami, North Carolina, and New Jersey. She also worked for the Western Electric Corporation in Kearney, New Jersey. She served as a coach for a semi-professional women's softball team for 22 years (1958–79) and as a coach at Middlesex County College in the late 1970s. Deegan moved to Florida in 1976 and died at the age of 82 following a two-year battle with breast cancer.

== Career statistics ==
Batting

GP	AB	R	H	2B	3B	HR	RBI	SB	TB	BB	SO	BA	OBP	SLG
533	1560	175	339	48	24	5	152	100	450	160	100	.217	.290	.288

Pitching

GP	W	L	W-L%	ERA	IP	H	RA	ER	BB	SO	HBP	WP	WHIP	SO/BB
146	66	59	.528	2.26	1081	755	444	271	514	412	82	26	1.17	0.80

Fielding

GP	PO	A	E	TC	DP	FA
336	770	946	135	1851	45	.927
