= Helen Callaghan =

Canadian baseball player

- Center field
- Born: March 13, 1923; Vancouver, British Columbia, Canada
- Died: December 8, 1992 (aged 69); Santa Barbara, California, U.S.
- Batted: Left Threw: Left
- Stats at Baseball Reference

Teams
- Minneapolis Millerettes (1944); Fort Wayne Daisies (1945–1946, 1948); Kenosha Comets (1949)

Career highlights and awards
- Second in batting average: .287 (1944); First in batting average: .299 (1945); Tied for home runs: 3 (1945); First in total bases: 156 (1945); First in total hits: 122 (1945); First in doubles: 17 (1945); Second in runs: 77 (1945); Second in stolen bases: 92 (1945)

Member of the Canadian

Baseball Hall of Fame
- Induction: 2021

Helen Callaghan Candaele St. Aubin (March 13, 1923 – December 8, 1992) was a left-handed center fielder who appeared in five seasons in the All-American Girls Professional Baseball League (AAGPBL), playing under the name Helen Callaghan.

== Baseball career ==
As a rookie with the Minneapolis Millerettes Callaghan hit a .287 average in 111 games, for second in the league. She also finished third in total bases, hits, runs and stolen bases (112), while tying for third in home runs. By then, her older sister, Margaret, was the team's third basewoman.

The Millerettes could not compete attendance-wise with the Minneapolis Millers, so the team moved in 1945, becoming the Fort Wayne Daisies. That year Callaghan had her best season, batting .299 to lead the AAGPBL (the league average was .198 that year). She tied for the league lead in homers (3), led in total bases (156), was second in steals (92), first in hits (122), second in runs (77) and first in doubles (17). Callaghan was often called the "Ted Williams of women's baseball". The league was not yet giving out Player of the Year or All-Star honors, but it is clear she was a candidate for both. Ft. Wayne finished second and advanced to the championship, but fell four games to one despite a .400 mark from the younger Callaghan.

Callaghan slipped drastically in 1946, hitting just .213, even though league averages rose about 10 points. She still tied for third in steals with 114. After missing the 1947 season due to illness, she returned for part of 1948 after getting married and having her first child. However, that year she hit just .191 as a bench player. She finished her career with Kenosha in 1949 as Helen Candaele, bouncing back to a .251 mark, tied for seventh in the league. She was ninth in total bases (113), eighth in steals (65), sixth in doubles and tied for eighth in triples.

In a five-season career, Callaghan was a .256 hitter (449-for-1756) with seven home runs and 117 runs batted in in 495 games, including 419 stolen bases, 299 runs, 44 doubles, 20 triples and 271 walks while striking out 220 times. Her on-base percentage was .355, while her slugging percentage was .315.

== Family ==
Helen had five sons. Casey Candaele is a former professional baseball player who spent nine years with the Montreal Expos, Houston Astros and Cleveland Indians of Major League Baseball, and currently manages and coaches in the Toronto Blue Jays system, presently as manager of the Buffalo Bisons in the International League, their Triple-A affiliate. Another son, Kelly Candaele, is a politician, filmmaker, teacher, and writer. He produced a PBS documentary special on the AAGPBL. Penny Marshall was inspired to create the 1992 film A League of Their Own after watching the documentary. Another son, Kerry Candaele, directed the 2013 documentary Following the Ninth, about the global influence of Beethoven's final symphony, and co-authored the book Journeys With Beethoven. Another son, Rick Candaele, is the former football coach at University of California, Santa Barbara and Claremont McKenna College.

== Death and legacy ==
Callaghan died due to breast cancer in Santa Barbara, California, on December 8, 1992, aged 69. In June 1998, the Canadian Baseball Hall of Fame inducted, as a group, the 68 Canadian women who played in the AAGPBL. In 2021, the Canadian Baseball Hall of Fame inducted Callaghan individually; being the first woman so honored.

== Career statistics ==
Batting

GP	AB	R	H	2B	3B	HR	RBI	SB	TB	BB	SO	BA	OBP	SLG
495	1756	299	449	44	20	7	117	419	554	271	220	.257	.355	.315

Fielding

GP	PO	A	E	TC	DP	FA
489	823	43	55	921	9	.940
