= Faye Dancer =

American baseball player (1925–2002)

- Center fielder / Pitcher
- Born: April 24, 1925; Santa Monica, California, U.S.
- Died: May 22, 2002 (aged 77); Los Angeles, California, U.S.
- Batted: Right Threw: Right

debut
- 1944,, for the Minneapolis Millerettes

Last appearance
- 1950,, for the Peoria Redwings

Career statistics
- Hits: 488
- Runs: 323
- Stolen bases: 352
- Win–loss record: 11-11
- Strikeouts: 43
- Earned run average: 2.28
- Stats at Baseball Reference

Teams
- Minneapolis Millerettes (1944); Fort Wayne Daisies (1945–'47); Peoria Redwings (1947–'48, 1950)

Career highlights and awards
- First AAGPBL player to hit two home runs in a single game and two Grand slams during a regular season; Averaged 70 or more stolen bases per season; Women in Baseball – AAGPBL Permanent Display at Baseball Hall of Fame and Museum (1988)

Faye Katherine Dancer (April 24, 1925 – May 22, 2002) was a center fielder who played from 1944 through 1950 for three teams of the All-American Girls Professional Baseball League (AAGPBL). Listed at 5 ft 6 in (1.68 m), 145 lb., she batted and threw right-handed.

== Women in baseball ==
The All-American Girls Professional Baseball League became a sensation in the 1940s when the Major Leagues were put on hold as men went to war. This fact remained little known in the late 1900s until the release of the 1992 film A League of Their Own. Directed by Penny Marshall and starring Geena Davis, Tom Hanks, Madonna, Lori Petty and Rosie O'Donnell, the film brought many of the female players from this time a rebirth of fame with its depiction of the first season of the AAGPBL.

== Early life ==
Born in 1925 in Santa Monica, California, Faye Dancer was the third of four children born into the family of James and Olive (née Pope) Dancer. Her father worked as an inspector for the Los Angeles Department of Water and Power. He later became an appliance store owner and sponsored a men's local softball team for a long time. While attending Santa Monica High School, the young Dancer played softball for a girls' team called the Dr Peppers, which was sponsored by the historic soft drink company. She also attended University High School in West Los Angeles, where she broke an all-city basketball record after shooting 42 baskets in just one minute. She ran an obstacle course in 9.4 seconds and fast-walked the half mile in 2 minutes and 42 seconds, and enjoyed kicking balls with the boys.

After her graduation in 1941, Dancer started to play professional softball in a southern California league. In 1944, Dancer signed a contract for $75 a week, a sizeable sum in those days and also the top salary for any player in the AAGPBL. As an aside, when she retired in 1950, she was earning $125 per week. Her greatest attribute was her stunning speed, which made her an adept base stealer. In her brief five-season career, she stole 358 bases, averaging 70 steals per season with a career-high 108 in her final year. She also was the first player in the league to hit two home runs in a game, and the first to belt two grand slams in a single season. Sometimes she pitched, posting an 11–11 record with 43 strikeouts and a 2.28 ERA in 25 appearances. Her career was shortened by a serious back injury, but the impression Dancer left on the league and her teammates was one of dedication, hustle and fun.

== Professional career ==
Dancer entered the AAGPBL in 1944 with the expansion Minneapolis Millerettes, a hapless team with poor fan support and few victories. In the inaugural season, the team finished dead last with a 23–36 record for the first half of the calendar and a 22–36 record in the second for an overall record of 45–72. Despite little encouragement, Dancer posted a .274 batting average with 58 runs and 48 runs batted in. Her 90 hits included 44 for extra bases and two grand slams.

In 1945, the Millerettes relocated to Fort Wayne, Indiana, where they were renamed the Daisies. During the next three seasons, Dancer became widely regarded as one of the most talented and colorful players of the league. She is often noted to have entertained the crowd, thriving on the attention, with her spontaneous cartwheels and backflips en route to the center field. She also participated in community events and gave the fans their money's worth on the field, not only in the outfield, but also at first base or as an emergency pitcher.

In 1945, Dancer dropped to .195 with 44 runs and 29 RBI, but posted a league-best three home runs. The next year she rebounded with a .250 average, 56 runs, and 43 RBI. In 1947, after 29 games with the Daisies, she was traded to the Peoria Redwings. Dancer finished the season with a combined average of .237, 51 runs and 26 RBI. In 1948 for Peoria, she batted .272 with a career-high 89 runs, six home runs, 34 RBI, and ranked second behind Sophie Kurys with 30 stolen bases. A litany of injuries forced her to retire following that season.

Dancer tried a return with the Redwings in 1950, but a herniated disk from a sliding injury and a chipped vertebra forced her permanent retirement after just 49 games. She hit .207 with 25 runs, 34 RBI, and amassed 108 stolen bases – by that time a league season record. She never appeared on any All-Star team or played in the playoffs.

During the off-season, Dancer worked as an electronics technician in the Howard Hughes Aircraft Company. Following her baseball career, she labored for a power generator company in Santa Monica for 35 years and also opened an electronics business with her fellow player and longtime friend Pepper Paire.

The AAGPBL folded in 1954, in part because Major League Baseball was televised. A permanent display at the Baseball Hall of Fame and Museum since November 5, 1988 honors those who were part of this unforgettable experience. Dancer, along with the rest of the AAGPBL players, is now enshrined in the venerable building at Cooperstown, New York. She joined more than 75 other former AAGPBL players for the opening of the exhibit, where her baseball glove and spikes are on permanent display, as well as her most famous photo that depicts her hustle and all-out play in 1948, while sliding into third base to avoid a tag. The void the league filled during wartime was inspiration for the aforementioned film, which brought a rejuvenated interest to the history of women's baseball.

Dancer lived in Santa Monica until moving in with her brother Richard to Los Angeles, California in 1990. Shortly thereafter, she was diagnosed with breast cancer. Within a month of diagnosis, she underwent surgery to remove her left breast along with 18 lymph nodes and lost her longtime job.

In 2001, the Sacramento River Cats team had Dancer threw out the first pitch to Pepper Paire. After that she received chemotherapy treatment.

== Death ==
Dancer died, aged 77, in 2002 after undergoing cancer surgery at the UCLA Medical Center.

== Personal life ==
Dancer never allowed her antics off the field to interfere with playing baseball. She frequently played with injuries, sustained from diving for fly balls or running into teammates or stands. A tough and free-spirited lady, she was known as the AAGPBL joker and an inveterate rule breaker, kicking against league structures on her private life. Dancer smoked and drank, and after her fiancé Johnny was killed in action during World War II, she never really considered marrying anybody else, despite having a significant number of boyfriends.

== Anecdote ==
Before the 1945 season, Dancer and Paire stopped in Arizona to watch Jim Thorpe, an American sports legend and a U.S. Olympic champion of the 1912 Stockholm Games. At the time, he had a baseball team called The Thunderbirds, but did not have enough money to pay for the team's hotel rooms, so both girls offered to stay and play in a ball game to get Thorpe out of his financial bind.

== Batting statistics ==
GP	AB	R	H	2B	3B	HR	RBI	SB	BA
591	2072	323	488	53	14	16	193	352	.236
