= Dottie Wiltse Collins =

American baseball player (1923–2008)

Dorothy Wiltse Collins
- Pitcher
- Born: September 23, 1923; Inglewood, California, U.S.
- Died: August 12, 2008 (aged 84); Fort Wayne, Indiana, U.S.
- Batted: Right Threw: Right

AAGPBL debut
- 1944, for the Minneapolis Millerettes

Last AAGPBL appearance
- 1950, for the Fort Wayne Daisies

AAGPBL statistics
- Batting average: .099
- Win–loss record: 117–76
- Earned run average: 1.83
- Stats at Baseball Reference

Teams
- Minneapolis Millerettes (1944); Fort Wayne Daisies (1945–1948, 1950)

Dorothy Wiltse Collins (September 23, 1923 – August 12, 2008) was an American professional baseball pitcher for the All-American Girls Professional Baseball League (AAGPBL) from 1944 to 1948 and 1950. Collins played her rookie season (1944) for the Minneapolis Millerettes and spent the rest of her career with the Fort Wayne Daisies. Known as the "Strikeout Queen," she set multiple AAGPBL records throughout her career and led the league with her winning percentage, fielding percentage, and strikeouts. Collins helped form the All-American Girls Professional Baseball league Players Association in 1987 and held many different positions during her tenure with the association.

The All-American Girls Professional Baseball League (AAGPBL) had over 500 women's baseball players from the years 1943 to 1954. With only a few exceptions, baseball games were played extremely similarly compared to the games Major League Baseball (MLB) players would play in. Philip Wrigley, owner of the Chicago Cubs, started the League in 1943 because he thought fans would forget about baseball because of World War II. The League's seasons would go from May to about mid-September. The players were paid between $55 and $150 per week for a 125-game season, where they would play almost every day with many doubleheaders on the weekends.

== Early years ==
Wiltse Collins, born September 23, 1923, in Inglewood, California, was the only child of Daniel Emerson Wiltse and Eleanor Camille Runswick. Her father was a Standard Oil Company welder and former semipro baseball player in the Los Angeles area and her mother was of an English-German-Italian background. On her father's side, Collins had a couple of distant relatives who played professional baseball in the MLB. Starting at a very young age, Collins's love of baseball was always reinforced with positivity.

Collins's father was her biggest role model in her baseball career. Every day once she got home from school, she would wait for her dad to get home from work so they could play catch in the backyard. Her father built a backstop in their backyard where they would practice a lot, but sometimes they would go to the school's softball field to provide more of a challenge for Collins. Along with practicing with her father and playing on softball teams, Collins was able to participate on a co-ed baseball team throughout elementary school.

Collins's sports career really started at the age of 9 when she became a bat girl for the Mark C. Bloome softball team, part of the Los Angeles' parks department softball league. While working as a bat girl during a bad game in 1935, the manager of the Mark C. Bloome softball team pulled Collins away from her bat girl job and placed her on the pitcher's mound in front of thousands of fans at Wrigley Field (Los Angeles). Collins was able to pitch the team to a victory at 11 years old.

As she got older, Collins was not able to play baseball in high school because school related sports were not allowed for girls during this time period. But she continued to play softball for the Mark C. Bloome softball team, as well as for the Goodrich Silvertown team. Collins graduated from Inglewood High School in 1941 and started working as a receptionist for Payne Furnace very soon after graduating. Once the United States entered into World War II, they mandated blackouts across the country, so many softball games had to be canceled. When the games were cancelled, Collins worked in a local factory manufacturing airplane parts.

== Professional baseball ==
In 1944, Bill Allington, Collins's former manager for her softball teams growing up, recommended that she try out for the All-American Girls Professional Baseball League (AAGPBL) (AAGPBL). Along with choosing Collins, Allington hand-picked five other girls from California to try out for the AAGPBL. That spring, Collins got on a train in Los Angeles and made her way to Chicago to try out for the League. Tryouts were very competitive, but all six of the 'California girls' ended up making it onto some of the League's teams. The fact that all six of the California girls made it into the League goes along with the idea that they were often described as having a lot of confidence and sometimes were even seen as cocky.

Over the course of Collins's career, the AAGPBL switched their pitching styles form underhand, to sidearm, and eventually settled on the overhand pitch. One of Collins's softball coaches was very surprised that she could throw a curveball underhanded, because he had never seen any other pitcher do that with a softball. Relying on her wicked curveball, Collins was able to strikeout over 200 batters her first four seasons in the League.

=== Minneapolis Millerettes (1944) ===
In their first and only season, the Millerettes only won 44 games. Halfway through the season, Minneapolis' owner decided to not disband the team, but to finish out the season by only playing away games. The team members became known as 'the Orphans' as they lived in hotels to finish out the 1944 season. Minneapolis' manager, Bill Allington, the man who recruited Collins into the AAGPBL, was described as being very intense but also very caring towards his players. One example of this is when Collins fell in the dugout and broke her tailbone without knowing it. When Collins went out to pitch in pain, Allington came out to ask what was wrong and made sure that she got to the hospital and was taken care of.

One of Collins's best games with the Millerettes was on June 17. She led the team against the Racine Belles and held them hitless for 10 2/3 innings, but the Millerettes ended up losing the game after 15 innings. Although the team did not do well as a whole, Collins was able to pitch a 20–16 record in her rookie season. Collins had a league-high 205 strikeouts, but also set an AAGPBL record for hitting 44 batters.

The Minneapolis Millerettes' main problem was where they were located on the map. The team was 400 miles away from the closest League town, which was the Rockford Peaches in Illinois. When scheduling, Minneapolis games were seen as a nightmare because the visiting teams would arrive to the stadium 'surly and exhausted'. Also, it was thought that the League's teams could not last longer in bigger cities, like Minneapolis. Smaller cities were thought to be better for the League. In 1945, the Minneapolis Millerettes were adopted by Fort Wayne, Indiana, and became the Daisies.

=== Fort Wayne Daisies (1945–1948 and 1950) ===
After Minneapolis was picked up by Fort Wayne in 1945, Collins had her best season as lead pitcher. In the 1945 season, Collins pitched 345 innings total and had a record of 29–10. She also had an AAGPBL single-season record of 293 strikeouts as well as 17 shutouts throughout the whole season. She pitched two no-hitters in 17 days and had 111 base-on-balls, also known as walks. Collins ended the season with a 0.83 ERA and a 0.744 winning percentage, which was tied for league best. In their first year in the League, the Daisies almost won the championship. At one point, the Fort Wayne Daisies were even described as being similar to the famous Yankees because they recruited the most talented players and dominated the league.

In the 1946 season, Collins, now pitching under her married name, Collins, won 22 games and struck out 294 batters, which was another record. In the 1947 season, Collins won 20 more games and led all AAGPBL pitchers with a 0.965 fielding percentage. At the beginning of the 1948 season, Collins announced her intention to retire at the end of the season to focus on motherhood, but ended up immediately retiring in mid-July.

After taking the 1949 season off to raise her daughter and work, Collins returned to the League for the 1950 season. In the 1950 season, she had an ERA of 3.46 and a winning percentage of 0.619. She ended the season with a 13–8 record. At the end of the 1950 baseball season, Collins decided to permanently retire from the game of baseball.

=== Player's support ===
Collins had a following. Many Fort Wayne Daisy fans would ask her for autographs and local florists would even send her flowers every time she pitched a shutout. One fan even made Collins's daughter a mini pink Daisy uniform. Collins eventually donated this uniform to the Northern Indiana Historical Society in South Bend, Indiana, which has the largest collection of AAGPBL memorabilia.

After Collins had gotten married, her husband Harvey would bring carloads of friends to away games to support her. Once Collins came back to baseball after having her daughter, Patricia, her teammates, husband, and mother-in-law were all very supportive of her. Collins's mother-in-law would sit with Patty on her lap in the stands to watch her games.

== Personal life ==
On August 28, 1945, Collins pitched and won both games of a doubleheader against the Rockford Peaches. After watching both baseball games, Harvey Collins, who had spent four years in the Navy during World War II, mentioned to his friend that he wanted to meet Dottie. Harvey's friend arranged for him to deliver beer to the apartment that she shared with five other players. Harvey asked Dottie out on a golf date for the next day, and she accepted. On March 10, 1946, Harvey Collins and Dottie got married and would be together for over 50 years.

After getting married, Collins continued to pitch very well. While four-months pregnant during the 1948 season, Collins finally decided to bench herself in the middle of the first game of a doubleheader. Harvey and Dottie's first child, Patricia, was born on December 22, 1948. Harvey and Dottie's second child, Daniel, was born on March 18, 1954.

== Retirement ==
After retiring from baseball in 1950, Collins started working for General Electric Company in Fort Wayne, Indiana. After her son Daniel was born in 1954, Collins started playing golf quite often. She won the Fort Wayne All-City Golf Championship twice, and even was able to share the trophy one time with her husband Harvey.

Collins was not able to stay away from sports for very long after she retired, and she soon started working part-time while also raising her family. She worked for Vim's Sporting Goods, and enjoyed helping young baseball players find the right bat for them, and then worked for The Baseball Blue Book, which is where all of the records for Major League Baseball were kept.

Collins was also very active in her community by promoting youth sports through the Elks Club in Fort Wayne during the late 1950s, into the 1960s and 1970s. She organized beginning and intermediate level golf games for children and also helped coordinate a children's bowling league. Although these sports that Collins helped promote and coordinate were for both boys and girls, they especially benefitted girls because there were very few sports options for girls to play during this time period.

=== Baseball in retirement ===
In the year 1982, the AAGPBL had their first reunion in over 30 years. All of the women met in Chicago, Illinois, where they had all traveled to try out for the League. In 1987, the All-American Girls Professional Baseball League Players Association was formed in South Bend, Indiana. The Player's Association was formed mainly by Collins reaching out and locating former League players. Collins served as the treasurer and newsletter editor for 9 years, as well as being a spokesperson for the Association.

Along with helping for the Players Association, Collins also helped open the "Women in Baseball" exhibit at the Baseball Hall of Fame in Cooperstown, New York, in 1988. Fittingly, Collins was able to open the curtain for the new exhibit in Cooperstown.

The Cooperstown exhibit as well as a documentary about the AAGPBL was inspiring for actress and director Penny Marshall. In 1992, Marshall decided to create the movie A League of Their Own, partially inspired by Collins's life and career. Collins was able to serve as a technical director on the set and helped make sure authenticity was being kept, especially when actual baseball was being played.

In 1999, Collins became one of the first two women to be included into the Fort Wayne Baseball Hall of Fame.

== Death ==
Collins died on August 12, 2008, at the age of 84. Her cause of death was a stroke according to her son-in-law. Collins left a lasting legacy for female athletes, especially female baseball players. She was described as being a fine ballplayer who embodied the AAGPBL's ideal of athleticism combined with femininity. Collins's star shone on and off the field during her playing career, which was shone with all of her promotion and organization over the years.
