= List of All-American Girls Professional Baseball League batting records =

List of best batters

This is a list of All-American Girls Professional Baseball League players who posted the best offensive marks in the history of the circuit.

Incidentally, the relatively low batting averages for many players reflect mainly the high quality of the AAGPBL pitchers, rather than a lack of skills by the hitters.

== All time batting records ==
Minimum of 1,000 at bats
Bold denotes category leader.

Player	BA	GP	AB	R	H	2B	3B	HR	RBI	SB	TB	BB	SO	OBP	SLG	OPS
Joanne Weaver	**.359**	329	1220	226	438	52	17	38	234	174	638	93	89	**.404**	.523	**.927**
Betty Foss	.342	498	1898	401	649	**117**	30	32	312	294	922	199	176	**.404**	.486	.890
Jean Geissinger	.306	328	1184	177	362	65	17	41	235	60	584	96	165	.358	.493	.851
Dorothy Kamenshek	.292	1012	3736	667	**1090**	89	41	13	304	657	**1300**	492	110	.374	.348	.722
Connie Wisniewski	.290	508	1780	295	517	70	25	7	189	168	658	253	133	.379	.370	.749
Mary Nesbitt	.286	247	1185	138	339	43	31	11	157	139	477	264	106	.416	.403	.819
Katie Horstman	.286	308	1057	164	302	42	14	23	150	28	441	104	61	.350	.417	.767
Elizabeth Mahon	.281	837	2562	432	721	84	34	8	400	364	897	358	150	.370	.350	.720
Doris Sams	.278	721	2485	290	690	82	23	22	286	154	884	214	194	.339	.356	.695
Eleanor Callow	.273	778	2058	381	756	88	**60**	**55**	407	214	1129	147	192	.310	**.549**	.859
June Peppas	.273	581	2093	248	572	50	13	21	205	70	711	210	170	.340	.340	.680
Doris Satterfield	.271	683	2517	321	682	90	42	9	365	209	883	199	121	.306	.350	.656
Betty Wagoner	.271	666	2248	367	609	54	14	0	191	221	691	403	145	.382	.307	.689
Merle Keagle	.266	337	1238	216	329	33	18	12	133	314	434	153	86	.347	.351	.698
Evelyn Wawryshyn	.266	544	1943	275	517	37	16	1	193	273	589	177	175	.327	.303	.630
Gertrude Dunn	.261	344	1226	154	320	49	5	6	105	70	397	138	46	.336	.324	.660
Sophie Kurys	.260	914	3298	**688**	859	71	39	22	278	**1114**	1074	522	204	.362	.326	.688
Wilma Briggs	.258	691	2456	375	633	64	24	43	301	128	874	380	214	.357	.356	.713
Naomi Meier	.258	710	2456	265	560	33	14	4	234	206	633	219	277	.291	.258	.549
Helen Callaghan	.256	495	1756	299	449	44	20	7	117	419	554	271	220	.355	.315	.670
Inez Voyce	.256	894	3047	386	781	81	28	28	422	168	1002	480	144	.358	.329	.687
Charlene Pryer	.255	704	2634	463	672	44	12	3	152	510	749	281	214	.327	.284	.541
Audrey Wagner	.254	694	2464	289	625	77	55	29	297	246	901	258	225	.325	.366	.691
Betty Francis	.251	429	1318	157	331	38	3	9	125	42	402	185	76	.343	.305	.648
Joan Berger	.250	345	1192	173	298	27	12	4	98	78	361	119	75	.318	.303	.621
Senaida Wirth	.248	616	2120	360	526	26	12	2	201	359	582	313	160	.349	.275	.624
Jane Stoll	.247	774	2636	319	651	88	15	5	312	216	784	367	189	.339	.297	.636
Betsy Jochum	.246	645	2401	307	591	43	29	7	232	358	713	177	104	.301	.297	.598
Ruth Richard	.241	725	2518	237	608	67	20	15	287	72	735	142	109	.282	.302	.584
Rose Gacioch	.238	866	2798	261	662	64	32	18	334	165	844	188	154	.286	.303	.589
Faye Dancer	.236	591	2072	323	488	53	14	16	193	352	617	261	223	.321	.298	.619
Bonnie Baker	.235	930	3308	465	776	44	20	1	244	506	862	404	210	.318	.261	.579
Delores Brumfield	.231	533	1767	215	408	61	17	4	160	107	515	247	176	.325	.291	.616
Margaret Russo	.230	501	1640	251	377	39	19	15	166	104	499	251	147	.332	.304	.636
Shirley Jameson	.229	385	1368	278	313	26	13	2	73	401	371	279	38	.359	.272	.631
Joyce Hill	.228	531	1515	191	345	34	14	0	167	81	407	292	149	.353	.269	.622
Jean Lovell	.228	470	1376	174	315	39	6	25	174	11	441	140	131	.300	.320	.620
Margaret Stefani	.227	642	2158	317	489	41	37	8	256	301	628	366	65	.339	.291	.630
Pepper Paire	.225	926	3164	251	713	79	15	2	400	79	828	308	117	.295	.262	.557
Jean Cione	.224	758	2447	240	548	67	27	8	247	86	693	232	299	.291	.283	.574
Mary Reynolds	.222	426	1388	128	308	27	17	1	142	29	372	194	129	.317	.268	.585
Vivian Kellogg	.221	747	2709	219	600	66	39	8	264	86	768	160	156	.265	.283	.548
Josephine Lenard	.221	1000	3420	465	756	73	31	1	351	481	894	481	23	.317	.261	.578
Fern Shollenberger	.221	918	3286	350	725	61	17	9	231	167	847	237	155	.271	.258	.529
Marilyn Olinger	.220	599	2175	334	479	34	7	4	115	197	539	255	334	.302	.248	.550
Sara Reeser	.218	342	1177	134	256	14	6	1	88	112	285	179	97	.305	.242	.547
Alva Jo Fischer	.216	345	1131	80	244	19	5	0	120	64	273	96	82	.277	.241	.518
Marguerite Pearson	.216	541	1760	195	381	36	14	18	197	70	499	279	183	.324	.284	.608
Shirley Stovroff	.216	455	1306	138	282	39	3	1	143	56	330	231	170	.334	.253	.587
Jean Smith	.214	567	1853	320	396	67	18	13	174	194	538	333	188	.334	.290	.624
Renae Youngberg	.214	341	1141	127	244	28	5	8	123	36	306	124	79	.291	.268	.559
Marjorie Pieper	.213	718	2414	256	513	76	30	17	254	181	700	286	191	.296	.290	.586
Dorothy Schroeder	.211	**1249**	**4129**	571	870	79	26	42	**431**	312	1127	**696**	**566**	.325	.273	.598
Arleene Johnson	.207	354	1119	91	183	14	13	3	103	123	232	117	104	.164	.240	.404
Rita Briggs	.206	757	2465	274	507	42	10	6	227	186	587	318	145	.296	.238	.534
Mary Rountree	.206	422	1211	105	250	14	6	0	107	89	276	166	86	.302	.228	.530
Lois Florreich	.204	504	1774	242	362	31	27	6	139	251	465	170	238	.274	.262	.536
Jenny Romatowski	.204	535	1639	115	334	21	3	6	128	31	379	97	114	.248	.231	.479
Alice Hohlmayer	.203	486	1486	85	301	35	15	3	128	43	375	138	192	.270	.252	.522
Lee Surkowski	.203	351	1166	128	237	21	16	5	85	98	305	108	93	.286	.262	.548
Claire Schillace	.202	417	1391	201	282	15	14	2	113	153	331	226	92	.314	.238	.552
Mildred Deegan	.200	533	1560	444	312	48	24	5	152	100	423	160	100	.274	.271	.545
Phyllis Koehn	.200	587	1946	199	390	37	21	6	195	116	487	97	143	.238	.250	.488
Twila Shively	.200	614	2141	274	429	42	20	4	166	255	523	291	322	.296	.244	.540
Alice DeCambra	.198	490	1578	152	313	29	6	0	105	107	354	138	76	.263	.224	.487
Ernestine Petras	.198	834	2790	359	552	55	16	0	196	420	639	342	249	.285	.229	.514
Margaret Callaghan	.196	672	2058	280	403	18	9	3	143	283	448	371	319	.319	.218	.537
Irene Ruhnke	.196	385	1327	137	260	22	18	2	130	87	324	91	80	.248	.244	.492
Dorothy Maguire	.194	595	1906	222	370	30	16	3	185	243	441	206	149	.273	.221	.494
Ruth Lessing	.191	559	1840	164	351	31	8	2	161	98	404	178	187	.262	.220	.482
Doris Tetzlaff	.190	625	2065	267	391	29	15	4	161	284	462	399	262	.322	.225	.547
Betty Whiting	.190	943	2947	311	561	64	17	3	232	198	688	422	303	.292	.267	.559
Helen Filarski	.190	534	1683	189	318	25	15	1	141	115	376	248	137	.309	.223	.532
Kathryn Vonderau	.189	642	2038	147	385	42	9	1	169	46	448	129	184	.237	.220	.457
Margaret Wenzell	.188	557	1677	179	316	30	21	1	128	147	391	256	170	.296	.233	.539
Mary Carey	.186	596	2807	281	523	41	9	2	169	198	588	263	255	.186	.256	.442
Nancy Mudge	.183	350	1094	186	200	25	3	8	55	97	255	204	233	.311	.233	.544
Elizabeth Fabac	.179	.321	1102	141	197	7	5	1	47	124	217	144	114	.274	.197	.471
Charlene Barnett	.175	355	1216	120	213	16	7	1	85	89	246	144	128	.262	.202	.464
Betty Trezza	.173	717	2566	331	444	29	28	6	191	363	547	285	241	.256	.213	.469
Alma Ziegler	.173	1154	3621	482	628	47	8	3	239	383	700	641	249	.298	.193	.491
Johanna Hageman	.167	320	1011	79	169	14	8	1	82	58	202	128	87	.261	.200	.461
Dorice Reid	.166	323	1026	108	170	11	5	0	60	69	191	130	145	.260	.186	.446

== Single game records ==
Category	Player	Club	Record	Date
scored	Sophie Kurys	Racine Belles	5	June 13, 1946
Hits	Dorothy Wind	Racine Belles	6	August 28, 1943
Doubles	Many players		2	
Triples	Lois Florreich	South Bend Blue Sox	3	July 1, 1945
Home runs	Many players		2	
Runs batted in	Marge Villa	Kenosha Comets	9	June 9, 1946
Stolen bases	Maddy English; Lois Florreich; Shirley Jameson; Betsy Jochum; Sophie Kurys	Racine Belles; South Bend Blue Sox; Kenosha Comets; South Bend Blue Sox; Racine Belles	7	May 21, 1947; July 24, 1944; July 2, 1944; August 2, 1944; September 3, 1944
Total bases	Marge Villa	Kenosha Comets	11	June 9, 1946
Walks	Irene Hickson	Racine Belles	5	June 13, 1946
Strikeouts	Many players		4	

== Single season records ==
Category	Player	Club	Record	Season
Games played	Rita Briggs	Racine Belles; Chicago Colleens	128	1948
batting average	Joanne Weaver	Fort Wayne Daisies	.429	1954
Hits	Betty Foss	Fort Wayne Daisies	144	1953
Runs scored	Sophie Kurys	Racine Belles	117	1946
Runs batted in	Jean Geissinger	Fort Wayne Daisies	91	1954
Doubles	Betty Foss	Fort Wayne Daisies	34	1951
Triples	Betty Foss	Fort Wayne Daisies	17	1952
Home runs	Joanne Weaver	Fort Wayne Daisies	29	1954
Stolen bases	Sophie Kurys	Racine Belles	201	1946
Walks	Sophie Kurys	Racine Belles	93	1946
Strikeouts	Theda Marshall	South Bend Blue Sox	79	1947
Total bases	Joanne Weaver	Fort Wayne Daisies	254	1954
On-base percentage	Joanne Weaver	Fort Wayne Daisies	.479	1954
Slugging average	Joanne Weaver	Fort Wayne Daisies	.763	1954
Others	Player	Club	Record	Dated
Consecutive games batting a hit	Mildred Warwick; Elizabeth Mahon	Rockford Peaches; South Bend Blue Sox	13	June 20–27, 1943; July 27-August 9, 1945
Consecutive games stealing a base	Shirley Jameson	Kenosha Comets	18	June 14–23, 1943
Consecutive games without striking out	Margaret Stefani	South Bend Blue Sox	57	June 30-August 22, 1943
Fewest strikeouts	Josephine D'Angelo	South Bend Blue Sox	3 in 108 games	1943 season
Sacrifice bunts	Sara Reeser	Muskegon Lassies	39	1947 season

== Single season leaders ==
*	Triple Crown winner

Season	Batting average leader	BA
1943	Gladys Davis	.332
1944	Betsy Jochum	.273
1945	(Note: In the 1945 season, two different players are often thought of as the batting champion. Statistics record Mary Nesbitt Wisham as having batted .319 in 66 games with 135 at-bats, with the AAGPBL website listing her as "batting champion". However, Helen Callaghan is also said in a different article on the same website as having led the circuit that year with a .299 batting average, doing so with 111 games played and 408 at-bats.)	
1946	Dorothy Kamenshek	.316
1947	Dorothy Kamenshek	.306
1948	Audrey Wagner	.312
1949	Doris Sams	.279
1950	Betty Foss	.346
1951	Betty Foss	.368
1952	Joanne Weaver	.344
1953	Joanne Weaver	.346
1954	Joanne Weaver	.429

== Sources ==
- All-American Girls Professional Baseball League Record Book – W. C. Madden. Publisher: McFarland & Company, 2000. Format: Softcover, 294pp. Language: English. ISBN 978-0-7864-3747-4

== See also ==
- All-American Girls Professional Baseball League fielding records
- All-American Girls Professional Baseball League pitching records
