= 1943 All-American Girls Professional Baseball League season =

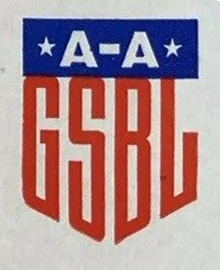
- Logo used for the first half of the 1943 season
- League: All-American Girls Professional Baseball League
- Sport: Baseball
- Games: 108
- Teams: 4

Regular season
- Season champions: Racine Belles (first half); Kenosha Comets (second half)

Scholarship Series
- Champions: Racine Belles

AAGPBL seasons
- None 1944 →

The 1943 All-American Girls Professional Baseball League season marked the inaugural season of the circuit. Since the only organized ball for women in the country was softball, the league created a hybrid game that included both softball and baseball. The league started play on May 30, 1943. Wrigley Field hosted a night game involving AAGPBL players as part of the war recruiting effort on July 1.

The league underwent a name change during the season: It began as the All-American Girls Softball League., but midway through the 1943 season, the name was changed to the All-American Girls Baseball League (AAGBBL).

The AAGPBL began with a 12-inch softball but incorporated baseball rules. The new league started with four teams, the Kenosha Comets, Racine Belles, Rockford Peaches and South Bend Blue Sox. The teams competed through a 108-game schedule, while the first Scholarship Series faced first-half winner Racine against Kenosha, second-half champ, in a Best of Five Series.

The strong pitching led to low batting averages, as the league hit a collective .230 average with Racine topping the chart (.246). Just one player, Rockford's Gladys Davis, reached the .300 mark. Only 72 home runs were batted for the four teams. Ten of these homers came from the bat of Eleanor Dapkus with Racine.

Kenosha pitcher Helen Nicol won the Triple Crown with 31 wins, 220 strikeouts and a 1.81 earned run average, and also led the league in winning percentage (.795), consecutive wins (13), complete games (33), shutouts (8) and innings pitched (348). The best individual pitching performance on the year came from Rockford's Olive Little, who hurled the first no-hitter in league history.

In the final series, Racine swept Kenosha in three games to win the first title of the league. Irene Hickson led the Belles with a .417 average, while pitcher Mary Nesbitt won two complete-game victories and relieved Joanne Winter in her win.

The AAGPBL drew 176,000 fans during its inaugural season, which assured the league would continue the following year.

== Teams ==
1943 All-American Girls Professional Baseball League Teams
Team	City	Stadium
Kenosha Comets	Kenosha, Wisconsin	Lake Front Stadium
Racine Belles	Racine, Wisconsin	Horlick Field
Rockford Peaches	Rockford, Illinois	Rockford Municipal Stadium
South Bend Blue Sox	South Bend, Indiana	Bendix Field

== Map of teams ==
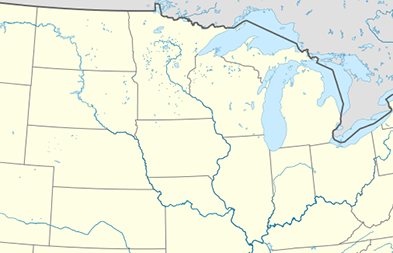
All-American Girls Professional Baseball League teams

== Standings ==
=== First half ===
Rank	Team	W	L	W-L%	GB
1	Racine Belles	34	20	.630	–
2	South Bend Blue Sox	28	26	.519	6
3	Kenosha Comets	23	31	.426	11
4	Rockford Peaches	23	31	.426	11

=== Second half ===
Rank	Team	W	L	W-L%	GB
1	Kenosha Comets	33	21	.611	–
2	South Bend Blue Sox	30	24	.556	3
3	Racine Belles	29	25	.521	4
4	Rockford Peaches	20	34	.370	13

=== Composite records ===
Rank	Team	W	L	W-L%	GB
1	Racine Belles	59	49	.546	–
2	South Bend Blue Sox	58	50	.537	1
3	Kenosha Comets	56	52	.518	3
4	Rockford Peaches	43	65	.398	16

== Postseason ==
Game	Teams	Score
1	Racine Belles @ Kenosha Comets	6 2
2	Racine Belles @ Kenosha Comets	7 4
3	Kenosha Comets @ Racine Belles	3 6

== Individual statistics ==
=== Batting ===
Statistic	Player	Record
Batting average	Gladys Davis (ROC); Irene Hickson (RAC); Mary Nesbitt (RAC); Betsy Jochum (SB); Shirley Jameson (KEN); Dorothy Kamenshek (ROC); Sophie Kurys (RAC); Doris Barr (SB); Dorothy Maguire (RAC); Edythe Perlick (RAC)	.332.280.280.273.271.271.271.269.269.268
Runs scored	Shirley Jameson (KEN); Margaret Stefani (SB); Gladys Davis (ROC); Betsy Jochum (SB); Madeline English (RAC); Claire Schillace (RAC); Josephine D'Angelo (SB); Irene Hickson (RAC); Mildred Warwick (ROC); Sophie Kurys (RAC)	111; 87; 78; 70; 69; 65; 62; 62; 62; 60
Hits	Betsy Jochum (SB); Gladys Davis (ROC); Shirley Jameson (KEN); Dorothy Kamenshek (ROC); Ann Harnett (KEN); Sophie Kurys (RAC); Margaret Stefani (SB); Mildred Warwick (ROC); Claire Schillace (RAC); Johanna Hageman (SB)	120; 116; 108; 107; 105; 104; 99; 93; 88; 85
Doubles	Betsy Jochum (SB); Ann Harnett (KEN); Johanna Hageman (SB); Edythe Perlick (RAC); Lois Florreich (SB); Phyllis Koehn (KEN); Eileen Burmeister (ROC); Sophie Kurys (RAC)	12; 10; 10; 10; 9; 9; 8; 8
Triples	Margaret Stefani (SB); Gladys Davis (ROC); Ann Harnett (KEN); Shirley Jameson (KEN); Audrey Wagner (KEN); Eileen Burmeister (ROC); Betsy Jochum (SB); Sophie Kurys (RAC); Mildred Warwick (ROC); Dorothy Wind (RAC)	11; 10; 10; 10; 10; 7; 7; 7; 7; 7
Home runs	Eleanor Dapkus (RAC); Ann Harnett (KEN); Gladys Davis (ROC); Lois Florreich (SB); Shirley Jameson (KEN); Phyllis Koehn (KEN); Margaret Stefani (SB); Audrey Wagner (KEN); Dorothy Kamenshek (ROC); Sophie Kurys (RAC)	11; 6; 4; 4; 4; 4; 4; 4; 3; 3
Runs batted in	Ann Harnett (KEN); Sophie Kurys (RAC); Gladys Davis (ROC); Margaret Stefani (SB); Phyllis Koehn (KEN); Johanna Hageman (SB); Dorothy Wind (RAC); Lois Florreich (SB); Betty Jane Fritz (RAC); Eleanor Dapkus (RAC); Edythe Perlick (RAC)	69; 59; 58; 55; 52; 45; 44; 43; 43; 42; 42
Stolen bases	Shirley Jameson (KEN); Margaret Stefani (SB); Madeline English (RAC); Irene Hickson (RAC); Betsy Jochum (SB); Lois Florreich (SB); Edythe Perlick (RAC); Charlotte Smith (RAC)	126; 90; 75; 68; 66; 57; 55; 54
Total bases	Gladys Davis (ROC); Ann Harnett (KEN); Betsy Jochum (SB); Shirley Jameson (KEN); Margaret Stefani (SB); Sophie Kurys (RAC); Dorothy Kamenshek (ROC); Phyllis Koehn (KEN); Mildred Warwick (ROC); Lois Florreich (SB)	155; 153; 149; 146; 139; 135; 128; 117; 115; 114

=== Pitching ===
Statistic	Player	Record
Wins	Helen Nicol (KEN); Mary Nesbitt (RAC); Margaret Berger (SB); Olive Little (ROC); Elise Harney (KEN); Doris Barr (SB); Gloria Marks (RAC); Marjorie Peters (ROC); Annebelle Thompson (RAC); Joanne Winter (RAC)	31; 26; 25; 21; 19; 15; 11; 11; 11; 11
Winning percentage	Helen Nicol (KEN); Mary Nesbitt (RAC); Margaret Berger (SB); Olive Little (ROC); Gloria Marks (RAC); Doris Barr (SB); Elise Harney (KEN); Joanne Winter (RAC)	.795.667.658.583.550.536.500.500
Earned run average	Helen Nicol (KEN); Margaret Berger (SB); Olive Little (ROC); Joanne Winter (RAC); Mary Nesbitt (RAC); Doris Barr (SB); Elise Harney (KEN); Marjorie Peters (ROC); Annebelle Thompson (RAC); Ruth Born (SB)	1.81; 1.91; 2.56; 2.57; 2.63; 2.90; 2.93; 3.10; 3.51; 3.59
Strikeouts	Helen Nicol (KEN); Olive Little (ROC); Margaret Berger (SB); Elise Harney (KEN); Mary Nesbitt (RAC); Doris Barr (SB); Catherine Bennett (KEN/SB)	220; 151; 112; 102; 85; 63; 53
Complete games	Helen Nicol (KEN); Elise Harney (KEN); Margaret Berger (SB); Mary Nesbitt (RAC); Olive Little (ROC); Marjorie Peters (ROC); Doris Barr (SB)	33; 30; 29; 29; 28; 24; 22
Innings pitched	Helen Nicol (KEN); Mary Nesbitt (RAC); Margaret Berger (SB); Elise Harney (KEN); Olive Little (ROC); Marjorie Peters (ROC); Doris Barr (SB); Annebelle Thompson (RAC); Clara Cook (ROC/KEN); Joanne Winter (RAC)	348; 308; 306; 304; 288; 270; 254; 223; 203; 200

== All-time individual records ==
- Josephine D'Angelo (SB) – Fewest strikeouts in a season: three times in 358 at bats
- Shirley Jameson (KEN) – Most consecutive games stealing a base: 18 (June 14–23)
- Margaret Stefani (SB) – Most consecutive games without striking out: 57 (June 3 – August 22)
- Mildred Warwick (ROC) – Most consecutive games batting a hit: 13 (June 20–27)
- Dorothy Wind (RAC) – Most hits batted in a single game: six (August 28)

== See also ==
- 1943 Major League Baseball season
