= 1946 All-American Girls Professional Baseball League season =

- League: All-American Girls Professional Baseball League
- Sport: Baseball
- Teams: Eight

Regular season
- Season champions: Racine Belles

Shaugnessy playoffs
- Champions: Racine Belles

AAGPBL seasons
- ← 1945 1947 →

The 1946 All-American Girls Professional Baseball League season marked the fourth season of the circuit. The AAGPBL expansion brought two new franchises to the previous six-team format. At this point, the Muskegon Lassies and the Peoria Redwings joined the Fort Wayne Daisies, Grand Rapids Chicks, Kenosha Comets, Racine Belles, Rockford Peaches and South Bend Blue Sox. The eight teams competed through a 112-game schedule, while the final Shaugnessy playoffs faced season winner Racine against defending champion Rockford in a Best of Seven Series.

Other modifications occurred in the league during 1946. The ball was decreased in size from 11½ inches to 11 inches. In addition, the base paths were lengthened to 70 feet and the sidearm pitching was introduced, as the league was moving toward baseball.

Several pitching records were set during the season. Racine's Anna Mae Hutchison recorded two marks that would never be broken: most innings pitched in a single game (19 against Peoria) and most games pitched in a single season (51). For their part, Fort Wayne's Dorothy Wiltse set the mark for more strikeouts in a season (294), and Racine's Joanne Winter a record for the most consecutive scoreless innings (63). The untiring Wiltse also pitched and won both games of a doubleheader (August 25).

Other highlights included Grand Rapids' Connie Wisniewski, who led all pitchers with a 0.96 earned run average. Besides this, Winter and Wisniewski combined for 33 wins each, the best ever in league history. In addition, Fort Wayne's Audrey Haine and South Bend's Doris Barr and Betty Luna hurled no-hitters. The only position player to top the .300 mark was Rockford's Dorothy Kamenshek (.316), proving that strong pitching was more important than having hot bats.

For the second consecutive season, one team won both the season title and the championship. Racine defeated South Bend in the first round, three games to one, and beat the defending champion Rockford in the best-of-seven series in six games. Racine was led by Winter, who won four games in the two playoffs, including a 15-inning, 1–0 victory in the final game of the Shaugnessy series. The Belles also received offensive support from Sophie Kurys, who batted an average of .372 (16-for-43) in 10 playoff games, while setting a postseason record with 16 stolen bases. Kurys also was honored with the AAGPBL Player of the Year Award, after hitting a second-best .286 while leading with 201 stolen bases (an all-time single season record) and 117 runs.

In the first three years after World War II, AAGPBL teams often attracted between two and three thousand fans to a single game. One league highlight occurred in 1946, when an estimated 10,000 people saw a Fourth of July doubleheader in South Bend, Indiana.

== Teams ==
1946 All-American Girls Professional Baseball League Teams
| Team | City | Stadium |
| Fort Wayne Daisies | Fort Wayne, Indiana | North Side High School; Memorial Park |
| Grand Rapids Chicks | Grand Rapids, Michigan | South High School Field |
| Kenosha Comets | Kenosha, Wisconsin | Lake Front Stadium |
| Muskegon Lassies | Muskegon, Michigan | Marsh Field |
| Peoria Redwings | Peoria, Illinois | Peoria Stadium |
| Racine Belles | Racine, Wisconsin | Horlick Field |
| Rockford Peaches | Rockford, Illinois | Rockford Municipal Stadium |
| South Bend Blue Sox | South Bend, Indiana | Playland Park |

== Map of teams ==
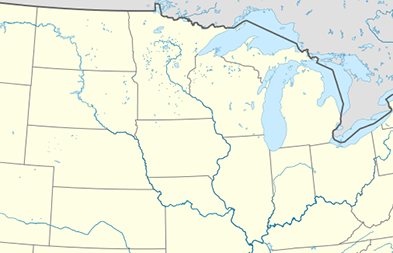
All-American Girls Professional Baseball League teams

== Final standings ==
| Rank | Team | W | L | W-L% | GB |
|---|---|---|---|---|---|
| 1 | Racine Belles | 74 | 38 | .661 | – |
| 2 | Grand Rapids Chicks | 71 | 41 | .569 | 3 |
| 3 | South Bend Blue Sox | 70 | 42 | .625 | 4 |
| 4 | Rockford Peaches | 60 | 52 | .536 | 14 |
| 5 | Fort Wayne Daisies | 52 | 60 | .464 | 22 |
| 6 | Muskegon Lassies | 46 | 66 | .411 | 28 |
| 7 | Kenosha Comets | 42 | 70 | .375 | 32 |
| 8 | Peoria Redwings | 33 | 79 | .295 | 41 |

== Postseason ==
First round Best of five series
1 | Racine Belles | 3
3 | South Bend Blue Sox | 1
2 | Grand Rapids Chicks | 2
4 | Rockford Peaches | 3

Second round Best of seven series
1 | Racine Belles | 4
4 | Rockford Peaches | 2

== Batting statistics ==
| Statistic | Player | Record |
|---|---|---|
| Batting average | Dorothy Kamenshek (ROC); Mary Baker (SB); Sophie Kurys (RAC); Merle Keagle (GR); Audrey Wagner (KEN); Elizabeth Mahon (SB); Rose Gacioch (ROC); Amy Applegren (MUS); Thelma Eisen (PEO); Eleanor Dapkus (RAC); Faye Dancer (FW); Betsy Jochum (SB) | .316.286.286.284.281.276.262.258.256.253.250.250 |
| Runs scored | Sophie Kurys (RAC); Elizabeth Mahon (SB); Dorothy Kamenshek (ROC); Twila Shively (GR); Edythe Perlick (RAC); Margaret Callaghan (FW); Margaret Stefani (SB); Merle Keagle (GR); Thelma Eisen (PEO); Betsy Jochum (SB); Mary Baker (SB); Shirley Jameson (KEN) | 117; 90; 78; 78; 72; 70; 70; 69; 68; 64; 63; 62 |
| Hits | Dorothy Kamenshek (ROC); Merle Keagle (GR); Sophie Kurys (RAC); Elizabeth Mahon (SB); Audrey Wagner (KEN); Rose Gacioch (ROC); Eleanor Dapkus (RAC); Twila Shively (GR); Betsy Jochum (SB); Edythe Perlick (RAC); Mary Baker (SB); Faye Dancer (FW); Lavonne Paire (RAC) | 129; 116; 112; 110; 110; 106; 102; 101; 100; 99; 92; 92; 91 |
| Doubles | Merle Keagle (GR); Audrey Wagner (KEN); Rose Gacioch (ROC); Faye Dancer (FW); Lavonne Paire (RAC); Alice Hohlmayer (KEN); Ruth Lessing (GR); Helen Callaghan (FW); Philomena Gianfrancisco (GR); Twila Shively (GR) | 15; 15; 14; 11; 10; 10; 10; 10; 9; 9 |
| Triples | Eleanor Dapkus (RAC); Thelma Eisen (PEO); Rose Gacioch (ROC); Edythe Perlick (RAC); Margaret Stefani (SB); Betty Trezza; Margaret Stefani (SB); Lois Florreich (KEN); Betsy Jochum (SB); Elizabeth Mahon (SB) | 9; 9; 9; 9; 8; 8; 8; 7; 7; 7 |
| Home runs | Audrey Wagner (KEN); Eleanor Dapkus (RAC); Edythe Perlick (RAC); Sophie Kurys (RAC); Margaret Villa (KEN); Margaret Danhauser (RAC); Mildred Deegan (ROC); Thelma Eisen (PEO); Philomena Gianfrancisco (GR); Betsy Jochum (SB); Merle Keagle (GR); Inez Voyce (SB) | 9; 8; 4; 3; 3; 2; 2; 2; 2; 2; 2; 2 |
| Runs batted in | Elizabeth Mahon (SB); Betsy Jochum (SB); Merle Keagle (GR); Lavonne Paire (RAC); Eleanor Dapkus (RAC); Rose Gacioch (ROC); Edythe Perlick (RAC); Philomena Gianfrancisco (GR); Margaret Stefani (SB); Audrey Wagner (KEN); Irene Ruhnke (FW); Naomi Meier (ROC); Dorothy Maguire (MUS); Twila Shively (GR) | 72; 63; 59; 59; 57; 57; 56; 53; 53; 53; 50; 49; 47; 45 |
| Stolen bases | Sophie Kurys (RAC); Thelma Eisen (GR); Helen Callaghan (FW); Elizabeth Mahon (SB); Dorothy Kamenshek (ROC); Merle Keagle (GR); Shirley Jameson (KEN); Senaida Wirth (SB); Edythe Perlick (RAC); Margaret Callaghan (FW); Margaret Stefani (SB); Betsy Jochum (SB) | 201; 128; 114; 114; 109; 107; 98; 89; 88; 80; 79; 78 |
| Total bases | Audrey Wagner (KEN); Eleanor Dapkus (RAC); Merle Keagle (GR); Sophie Kurys (RAC); Rose Gacioch (ROC); Dorothy Kamenshek (ROC); Elizabeth Mahon (SB); Betsy Jochum (SB); Twila Shively (GR); Thelma Eisen (PEO) | 162; 150; 145; 143; 141; 141; 134; 127; 121; 120 |

== Pitching statistics ==
| Statistic | Player | Record |
|---|---|---|
| Wins | Joanne Winter (RAC); Connie Wisniewski (GR); Carolyn Morris (ROC); Anna Mae Hutchison (RAC); Betty Luna (SB); Phyllis Koehn (SB); Dorothy Wiltse (FW); Josephine Kabick (GR/KEN); Alice Haylett (GR); Erma Bergmann (MUS); Helen Nicol (KEN); Viola Thompson (SB) | 33; 33; 29; 26; 23; 22; 22; 19; 17; 15; 15; 15 |
| Earned run average | Connie Wisniewski (GR); Joanne Winter (RAC); Jean Faut (SB); Carolyn Morris (ROC); Anna Mae Hutchison (RAC); Kay Blumetta (PEO); Faye Dancer (FW); Merle Keagle (GR); Erma Bergmann (MUS); Helen Nicol (KEN); Nancy Warren (MUS); Jane Jacobs (PEO) | 0.96; 1.19; 1.32; 1.42; 1.62; 1.71; 1.93; 1.94; 2.05; 2.09; 2.12; 2.13 |
| Strikeouts | Dorothy Wiltse (GR); Carolyn Morris (ROC); Joanne Winter (RAC); Kay Blumetta (PEO); Helen Nicol (KEN); Audrey Haine (FW/GR); Alice Haylett (GR); Anna Mae Hutchison (RAC); Betty Luna (SB); Olive Little (ROC); Annabelle Lee (PEO) | 294; 240; 183; 137; 137; 120; 113; 102; 93; 88; 83 |
| Games pitched | Anna Mae Hutchison (RAC); Dorothy Wiltse (GR); Connie Wisniewski (GR); Joanne Winter (RAC); Betty Luna (SB); Josephine Kabick (GR/KEN); Phyllis Koehn (SB); Alice Haylett (GR); Annabelle Lee (PEO); Erma Bergmann (MUS); Lois Florreich (KEN); Elise Harney (KEN/SB); Helen Nicol (KEN) | 51; 49; 48; 46; 41; 40; 39; 38; 35; 33; 33; 33; 33 |
| Innings pitched | Connie Wisniewski (GR); Dorothy Wiltse (GR); Carolyn Morris (ROC); Joanne Winter (RAC); Josephine Kabick (GR/KEN); Phyllis Koehn (SB); Betty Luna (SB); Anna Mae Hutchison (RAC); Erma Bergmann (MUS); Elise Harney (KEN/FW ) Lois Florreich (KEN); Olive Little (ROC) | 366; 357; 356; 349; 324; 309; 298; 288; 263; 255; 247; 244 |

== See also ==
- 1946 Major League Baseball season
- 1946 Japanese Baseball League season
