= Betty Russell =

American baseball player (1924–1985)

- Outfield
- Born: October 1, 1924; Globe, Arizona, US
- Died: 1985 (aged 60); Tonto Basin, Arizona, US
- Batted: Right Threw: Right
- Stats at Baseball Reference

Teams
- Racine Belles (1946)

Career highlights and awards
- Championship team (1946)

Betty Josephine "Rusty" Russell (October 1, 1924 – May 28, 1985) was an outfielder who played in the All-American Girls Professional Baseball League (AAGPBL). Listed at 5 ft 6 in (1.68 m), 145 lb, Russell batted and threw right-handed. She was born in Globe, Arizona.

A member of a championship team, Betty Russell played for the Arizona Ramblers before joining the league with the Racine Belles during the 1946 season.

Russell saw little action with Racine, while playing as a fourth outfielder for all-stars Eleanor Dapkus, Edythe Perlick and Claire Schillace. She hit a .143 average in 12 games to help Racine clinch the 1946 championship.

Russell died in 1985 in Tonto Basin, Arizona, at the age of 60.

Three years after her death, she became part of Women in Baseball, a permanent display based at the Baseball Hall of Fame and Museum in Cooperstown, New York, which was unveiled to honor the entire All-American Girls Professional Baseball League.

== Batting statistics ==
GP	AB	R	H	2B	3B	HR	RBI	SB	BB	SO	BA
12	28	0	4	1	0	0	1	0	0	1	.169
