= Annabelle Thompson =

Canadian baseball player

Annebelle Thompson
- Pitcher
- Born: November 22, 1924; Edmonton, Alberta, Canada
- Died: August 10, 1983 (aged 58); Edmonton, Alberta, Canada
- Batted: Right Threw: Right

Teams
- Racine Belles (1943)

Career highlights and awards
- Championship Team (1943); Canadian Baseball Hall of Fame Honorary Induction (1998)

Annabelle Thompson, later McFarlane (November 22, 1924 – August 10, 1983), was a pitcher who played in the All-American Girls Professional Baseball League (AAGPBL) during the 1943 season. She batted and threw right handed.

Born in Edmonton, Alberta, Annie Thompson was one of the 68 players born in Canada to join the All-American Girls Professional Baseball League in its twelve years history. She also became one of the sixty original players recruited by the league for its inaugural season.

Thompson was assigned to the Racine Belles, a team managed by former big leaguer Johnny Gottselig, as part of a pitching staff headed by Mary Nesbitt, Joanne Winter and Gloria Marks.

In her only season she posted a team second-best 11 wins and ranked among the top 10 pitchers of the league, ending eighth in innings pitched (223) and ninth in earned run average (3.51), while tying for seventh for the most wins to help Racine win the championship.

Thompson is part of Women in Baseball, a permanent display based at the Baseball Hall of Fame and Museum in Cooperstown, New York, which was unveiled in 1988 to honor the entire All-American Girls Professional Baseball League. She also gained honorary induction into the Canadian Baseball Hall of Fame in 1998. She died in Edmonton in 1983.

== Career statistics ==
Pitching

GP	W	L	W-L%	ERA	IP	H	RA	ER	BB	SO	WHIP
32	11	15	.423	3.51	223	237	159	86	64	23	1.35

Batting

GP	AB	R	H	2B	3B	HR	RBI	SB	BB	SO	BA
32	85	5	13	2	1	1	4	2	10	29	.153

Fielding

GP	PO	A	E	TC	FA
32	11	78	10	99	.900
