= Mary Nesbitt Wisham =

American baseball player

Mary Nesbitt
- First base / Pitcher
- Born: February 1, 1925; Greenville, South Carolina, U.S.
- Died: November 17, 2013 (aged 88); Palatka, Florida, U.S.
- Batted: Left Threw: Left

Teams
- Racine Belles (1943–1945); Peoria Redwings (1947–1948, 1950)

Career highlights and awards
- All-Star Team (1943); Batting title (1945); Single-season leader in doubles (1948); Championship Title (1943)

Mary Nesbitt Wisham (February 1, 1925 – November 17, 2013) was an American baseball pitcher and first basewoman who played from 1943 through 1950 in the All-American Girls Professional Baseball League (AAGPBL). Listed at 5 ft 8 in (1.73 m), 155 lb., Nesbitt batted and threw left-handed. She was born Marie Crews Nesbitt in Greenville, South Carolina. Before becoming married in 1946 she played under the name of Mary Nesbitt.

== Brief profile ==
Nesbitt was responsible for league firsts in her All-American Girls Professional Baseball League career. She is recognized as one of the sixty original founding members of the league. An ideal fastpitch, knuckleball left-handed, she was a pitcher in the early years of the circuit. The unpredictable movement of her pitches made it difficult to hit, until an injury suffered in a regular game shortened her career. She posted a 65–49 record with a 2.44 earned run average in 120 pitching appearances. After that she switched to first base, through the rest of her career, ranking among the top 10 AAGPBL players for five out of her six seasons. Her accomplishments also included appearing in the first ever AAGPBL All-Star Game and by collecting a .422 on-base percentage and a .393 of slugging, while her .282 batting average ranks her sixth in the all-time list of hitters who had a minimum of 1000 at bat appearances.

== Early life ==
Nesbitt played ball ever since elementary school. At age 12 she hurled in a fast-pitch softball league in her hometown, and later played for some championship teams in Illinois and Florida, as well as for a men's team in Chattanooga, Tennessee, where baseball scout Jimmy Hamilton was impressed with her talent. He decided to invite the young pitcher to an All-American Girls Professional Baseball League tryout.

== AAGPBL career ==
During her first three seasons Nesbitt played first base when she was not pitching. In 1943, the Racine Belles, with Johnny Gottselig at the helm, won both the first half of the season and AAGPBL championship behind a strong effort by Nesbitt, who led the pitching staff with a 26–13 record for a .667 winning percentage (fifth-best of the league), including 308 innings of work in 47 appearances. She also hit .280, scored 34 runs, and drove in 29 more in 73 games.

At a time of the season, Nesbitt put together an 11-game winning streak. On July 1, 1943, took effect the first All-Star Game of the league, which coincidentally was the first night game ever played at Wrigley Field. The game was played under temporary lights between two teams composed of Blue Sox and Peaches players against Comets and Belles players.

Besides Nesbitt, the Belles also counted with Joanne Winter, who posted an 11–11 record, to give the team a strong one-two pitching staff, while Margaret Danhauser, Maddy English, Edythe Perlick and Claire Schillace could be counted on for their bats and solid defense. The attack was led by slugging right fielder Eleanor Dapkus, who hit a league-lead 10 home runs, while the speedy Sophie Kurys stole 44 bases and scored 60 runs. Irene Hickson, who shared the catching duties with Dorothy Maguire, was known as an opportune hitter with runners in scoring position during the late innings. Most importantly, Hickson was a solid fielding catcher with a strong throwing arm, and had a reputation as a good handler of pitchers. Early in the season, Nesbitt and Hickson were referred as the ″Belles Chattanooga Battery″, because both were scouted by Jimmy Hamilton in there.

The first AAGPBL Championship Series pitted first-half winner Racine against Kenosha Comets, second-half champ. In the best-of-five series, Racine swept Kenosha to clinch the first championship in the league's history. Nesbitt claimed complete-game victories in Games 1 and 3, and saved Game 2 after starter Winter ran into trouble in the eight inning. Meanwhile, Hickson led all-hitters with a .417 average and five RBI in the three games. In 1944, Nesbitt posted the team's only winning record, 23–17, with a career-high 106 strikeouts in 45 games, while the other pitchers of Racine suffered off years. Winter slipped to a 15–23 ledger, and the rest of the staff combined for a 16–23 mark. Nesbitt also provided some help with her bat, hitting .220 with 14 runs and 23 RBI in 74 games.

Nesbitt stayed on the mound until she fractured her collarbone in 1945. She finished with a 16–19 record in 37 appearances, while hitting a league-best .319 in 66 games, while the league average was a measly .198 that year. Incidentally, the relatively low batting averages in the early years reflect mainly the high quality of AAGPBL pitchers, rather than a lack of skills by the hitters.

Nesbitt did not play in 1946. She married Vester Wisham, who worked for the Racine team. They were working a farm in Georgia when a scout was sent out to find her and see about coming back to play in the league again. The scout paid her a $500 bonus for sign up, and she opened 1947 with the Peoria Redwings. That season the AAGPBL moved its spring training camp to Havana, Cuba. After the injury, she had less command of her array of pitches, especially her hard knuckleball, and she was given the chance to play on a regular basis at first base. She responded with a .261 average in 110 games, including 47 runs, 58 RBI, and a grand slam. Her most productive season came in 1948, when she paced the league with 24 doubles and posted career numbers in average (.292), runs (69), RBI (58), at-bats (399), hits (128) and games played (126), ranking between the top ten in these offensive categories. She helped Peoria reach a 71–55 record, for the first and only winning season in team's history. It also was the first and only time the Redwings made the playoffs, only to be swept by the Racine Belles in three straight games.

In 1950, she posted a significant average of .340 with 25 runs and 22 RBI in just only 49 games. She quit baseball again, while she was pregnant with the first of her four children. Fanatics gave her a baby shower on the field. The family moved later to Hollister in Putnam County, Florida, after learning there were six acres and a house for sale.

== Life after baseball ==
Mary did return to play for three months for a team in Miami, but it never caught on as it had in the All-American Girls Professional Baseball. She and her husband were married for 52 years, until his death in 1998. For more than 20 years she drove a school bus in Putnam County, but she did not give up playing ball, joining in with local women's leagues. Her daughter, Mary Elizabeth, joined her, and they were part of the team that won the state championships for fast-pitch softball in 1975. They finished ninth at the national championship. Nesbitt Wisham was 65 years old when she played in that championship tournament held at Louisville, Kentucky. A recreation complex park in West Putnam has been named in her honor.

In November 1988, Mary Nesbitt Wisham along with her former teammates and opponents, received their long overdue recognition when the Baseball Hall of Fame and Museum in Cooperstown, New York, dedicated a permanent display to the All American Girls Professional Baseball League. She lived in Hollister, Florida, until her death on November 17, 2013, in Palatka, Florida.

== Statistics ==
=== Batting ===
GP	AB	R	H	2B	3B	HR	RBI	SB	BB	SO	TB	BA	OBP	SLG
498	1488	209	419	55	36	13	186	161	209	117	585	.282	.422	.393

=== Fielding ===
PO	A	E	TC	DP	FA
3092	522	88	3702	234	.976

=== Pitching ===
GP	W	L	W-L%	ERA	IP	H	R	ER	BB	SO	WHIP
120	65	49	.570	2.44	935	633	380	253	388	249	1.091
