= Dorothy Maguire =

American baseball player (1918–1981)

- Catcher/Outfielder
- Born: November 21, 1918; LaGrange, Ohio, U.S.
- Died: August 2, 1981 (aged 62); Spencer, Ohio, U.S.
- Batted: Right Threw: Right

Teams
- Racine Belles (1943); Milwaukee Chicks (1944); Grand Rapids Chicks (1945); Muskegon Lassies (1946–1949)

Career highlights and awards
- All-Star (1943); Two-time Championship team (1943–1944)

Dorothy Maguire (November 21, 1918 – August 2, 1981) was a catcher and outfielder who played from 1943 through 1949 in the All-American Girls Professional Baseball League (AAGPBL). Maguire batted and threw right-handed. She also played under the name of Dorothy Chapman.

== Career summary ==
An All-Star catcher, Dorothy Maguire was one of the sixty original members of the All-American Girls Professional Baseball League. While only a modest hitter at the plate, Maguire displayed considerable skill in handling pitchers and an ability to understand the strategy of the game. She achieved a playoff berth in six of her seven seasons in the league, including the championship teams in 1943 and 1944, though she played with three different teams based in four different cities, because the league shifted players as needed to help teams stay afloat. Her life was full of energy, excitement, and risks unfamiliar to many women through the years, as she worked in cabbage fields during the Great Depression, raised horses, worked in factories, and drove taxi cabs in Cleveland during World War II. She was dubbed Mickey after Detroit Tigers catcher Mickey Cochrane, due to her tenacity to accomplish any task she set out to do and her amazingly warm-hearted spirit.

The league made an auspicious debut, averaging about 1,000 fans per game in 1943, while attracting about 210,000 for the entire year. Early in the 1944 season, Philip K. Wrigley sold the league to Arthur Meyerhoff. It was under Meyerhoff's management that expansion and the publicity campaign of the AAGPBL reached its peak. The circuit excelled in attendance and performing during the 1948 season, when 10 teams attracted 910,000 paid fans, but by 1954, attendance dropped to only 270,000, dooming the league to extinction. It was a neglected chapter of sports history, at least until 1992, when filmmaker Penny Marshall premiered her film A League of Their Own, a fictionalized account of activities in the AAGPBL that brought a rejuvenated interest to the extinct league.

Maguire was born Dorothy Maime McAlpin in LaGrange, Ohio, and grew up playing sandlot ball with her neighborhood kids at an early age, most of them boys, but did not start participating in organized baseball until she was 16. She then joined the Erin Brew, a perennial champion fastpitch team based in Cleveland, where she was discovered by an AAGPBL scout. She was invited to assist in final tryouts at Wrigley Field. Following a week and a half of drills, she was allocated to the Racine Belles, a team managed by hockey legend Johnny Gottselig.

Maguire enjoyed a good first season. She shared catching duties with Irene Hickson, while the Belles claimed the first Championship Title in the league's history. Racine was characterized by strong pitching, solid defense, timely hitting and speed on the bases. Mary Nesbitt posted a 26–13 record in the regular season, while Joanne Winter finished with an 11–11 mark to give Racine a strong one-two pitching staff. The offense was led by Eleanor Dapkus, who hit a league-lead 10 home runs. The speedy Sophie Kurys stole a league-best 44 bases and scored 60 runs, while Margaret Danhauser, Maddy English, Edythe Perlick and Claire Schillace could be counted on for their bats and solid defense. In the Championship Series, the Belles defeated the Comets, winners of the second half, 3 games to 0. Maguire hit .269 in 70 games, driving in 33 runs while scoring 34 times. She also appeared in the All-Star game during the midseason, which was played between two teams composed of Belles and Comets players against Blue Sox and Peaches players.

Two new teams joined the league in 1944, the Milwaukee Chicks and the Minneapolis Millerettes. Maguire started the season with the expansion Chicks as their regular catcher, appearing in 109 of the 117 games of her team. She married Tom Maguire, who was reported killed in action during wartime in the month of June. Maguire received a call just before a game from her mother, but kept the news to herself and entered the field of play. After completing the game, she reported the news to the press. Then, she received a couple of letters from him in August from a hospital in Italy, explaining that he had not been identified for that time and was presumed dead. This event provided partial inspiration for the character of catcher Dottie Hinson, portrayed by actress Geena Davis in the film A League of Their Own.

That season, Maguire batted .191 with 40 runs and 39 RBI, while playing catcher.The Chicks’ pitching staff included Josephine Kabick (26–19) and Connie Wisniewski (23–10). Merle Keagle, who led the AAGPBL with seven home runs and 145 total bases, and batted .264 with 47 RBI. Alma Ziegler played second base and contributed as a baserunner and defender.

With Max Carey at the helm, the Chicks went 30–26 in the first half of the year, but dominated the second half (40–19) and had the best overall record (70–45). They then went on to win the Championship Title, beating Kenosha in seven playoff games. Although the Chicks won the title, they had no local financial backing and could not compete with the American Association Milwaukee Brewers. In fact, the Chicks were forced to play all seven games of the series at Kenosha's Lake Front Stadium because the Brewers were using the Borchert Field in Milwaukee. In addition, the high ticket prices charged for AAGPBL games failed to encourage significant fan support. Due to lack of community support and skepticism of journalists, the Chicks moved to Grand Rapids, Michigan prior to the 1945 season.

Two teams were added in the AAGPBL's 110-game 1945 regular season, the Fort Wayne Daisies and the Grand Rapids Chicks. Maguire continued her stellar play with the Chicks at Grand Rapids, helping her team to reach the playoffs. She also contributed with a .159 average in 99 games, driving in 20 runs while scoring 35 times. The Chicks finished third with a 60–50 record, but lost in the first round to Rockford, three games to one.

In 1946 the AAGPBL acquired franchises for two more teams, the Muskegon Lassies and the Peoria Redwings. A four-team minor league also was established in Chicago as the Chicago Girls Baseball League (CGBL), while the spring training camp was moved to Pascagoula, Mississippi. Maguire was dealt to the Lassies in order to establish the new team, which was managed by Buzz Boyle. She posted career-numbers in hits (74), runs (42) and RBI (47), while hitting a .218 average in 101 games, a pretty good performance considering Muskegon finished sixth in the eight-team league with a losing record of 46–66.

In April 1947, all of the league's players were flown to Havana, Cuba, for spring training. Maguire saw little action with the Lassies that year, but she still managed a .216 average with 28 runs and 24 RBI in just 75 games due to an injury. Muskegon improved considerably under a new manager, Bill Wambsganss, to win a close pennant race with a fine 69–43 record, backed by a strong performance from outfielder/pitcher Doris Sams, who hit a third-best .280 average with 31 runs and 41 RBI in 107 games, and posted an 11–4 pitching record with a respectable 0.93 earned run average, to finish second only to Grand Rapids' Mildred Earp (.068). Sams was named Player of the Year, but Muskegon fell in the first round of the playoffs, dropping 3 of 4 games to Racine.

For the 1948 season, the AAGPBL expanded to a historical peak of ten teams divided into Eastern and Western Divisions. That year, Maguire returned in good form, playing all but one game for her team. She hit a career-low .155 (58-for-373) with 58 runs and 30 RBI in 124 games, but recorded career-numbers in at-bats and game appearances. Muskegon remained strong, finishing 67–58 for the second-best record in the eastern division, but fell in the first round of the playoffs to Grand Rapids by a 3–1 margin.

Maguire was divorced in 1947. After marrying George Chapman in 1949, she decided to retire at the end of the season. Used sparingly, she hit .148 in only 17 games. Muskegon, now managed by Carson Bigbee, fell back to sixth place (46–66) in the eight-team league, but won a wild card playoff berth. The Lassies took the first round from Kenosha, two to zero games, but were swept in the next round by Grand Rapids in three games.

== After baseball ==
Following her baseball career, Mickey raised six children from 1950 to 1959 with her husband George but became a single mother in 1963. According to author Dan Gutman, Dorothy and George Chapman's son Richard Chapman tried out for the Kansas City Royals in 1970. She also entered into horse training as a hobby, to become a distinguished horsewoman at a high level. In the 1960s, she was well known for her championships in the Central Ohio Saddle Club Association with Chico's Flame, one of the best Morgan horses. In many ways, she characterized the quality of athlete and the type of woman who helped make history, and her contributions will never be forgotten. She died in Spencer, Ohio, at the age of 62. Son Richard Chapman attended the first AAGPBL Players Reunion shortly after his mother's death in 1982, and in an interview with Baseball America, noted, "When I went to the reunion in 1982 to represent her, I learned more about her playing than she had ever said. There is a lot of history getting lost.”

Dorothy McAlpin Maguire Chapman was inducted into the Ohio Hall of Fame in 2010. She also is part of Women in Baseball, the AAGPBL permanent display at the Baseball Hall of Fame and Museum at Cooperstown, New York, which was inaugurated on November 5, 1988 in honor of the entire league rather than individual baseball personalities.

Two of her sons are executives with the All American Girls Professional Baseball League Players' Association. Richard Chapman is president and George Champan Jr. is the Treasurer of the Players' Association.

== Career statistics ==
Batting

GP	AB	R	H	2B	3B	HR	RBI	SB	BB	SO	BA	OBP	SLG
595	1906	222	370	30	16	3	185	243	206	149	.194	.273	.231

Fielding

GP	PO	A	E	TC	DP	FA
574	1922	525	190	2637	56	.928
