= Mildred Warwick =

Canadian baseball player

- Third base
- Born: October 18, 1922; Regina, Saskatchewan, Canada
- Died: December 9, 2006 (aged 84); Edmonton, Alberta, Canada
- Batted: Right Threw: Right

Teams
- Rockford Peaches (1943–1944)

Career highlights and awards
- All-Star (1943); Alberta Baseball Hall of Fame induction (1991); Canadian Baseball Hall of Fame induction (1998); Saskatchewan Hall of Fame induction (1986)

Mildred Marion Warwick (October 18, 1922 – December 9, 2006) was a Canadian infielder who played from 1943 through 1944 in the All-American Girls Professional Baseball League (AAGPBL). Listed at 5' 2", 115 lb., she batted and threw right handed.

Born in Regina, Saskatchewan, Warwick was one of the 68 players born in Canada to join the All-American Girls Professional Baseball League in its twelve-year history. She was one of the most feared hitters in the early years of the circuit, setting an all-time hitting streak record during her very short career.

The first AAGPBL spring training was set for May 17, 1943, at Wrigley Field in Chicago. Philip K. Wrigley, founder of the league, had scouts all over the United States and Canada signing girls for tryouts. About 500 of them attended the call. Of these, only 280 were invited to the final try-outs in Chicago where 60 were chosen to become the first women to ever play professional baseball. The league started with four teams, the Kenosha Comets, the Racine Belles, the Rockford Peaches and the South Bend Blue Sox. Each team was made up of fifteen girls. Warwick survived the final cut and was assigned to the Rockford team, where she played in just two seasons.

Warwick grew up in Regina along with five brothers, including a twin. Brothers Grant and Bill played hockey at the time. At an early age, she played softball with her brothers at a big field next to her home. She began playing softball in school at age 12. She played for the Regina Army Navy Bombers team when she was 20, when a scout of the league saw her hitting and fielding abilities and invited her to Wrigley Field.

She started at third base for the Peaches, managed by Eddie Stumpf, as a part of a well assembled infield that included Dorothy Kamenshek (1B), Mildred Deegan (2B) and her fellow Gladys Davis (SS).

From June 20 to 27, 1943, Warwick hit safely in 13 consecutive games to set an all-time league record that stood until Kenosha Comets' Elizabeth Mahon tied it two years later. She batted a .263 average in 88 games, a pretty good performance considering her teammate Davis was the only one to reach the .300 mark in the inaugural season (.332). Warwick also scored 62 runs and drove in 30 more, ranking eight in hits (93) and ninth in total bases (115), while tying for seventh in triples (7) and runs. She also established another league record with 10 assists at third base in a single game.

For the first three seasons, the league did not have an official All-Star team. Nevertheless, on July 1, 1943 the first AAGPBL All-Star Game was held, which coincidentally became the first night game ever played at Wrigley Field. The contest was played under temporary lights between two teams composed of Kenosha and Racine players against Rockford and South Bend players.

Warwick played another season in 1944. In 1945 she married hockey player Ken McAuley, a goaltender for the NHL New York Rangers, and decided to settle down with her husband in Edmonton, Alberta. She continued to play fastpitch softball for an Edmonton team that clinched the Canadian title in 1951. She also worked for the Department of Energy for 27 years, retiring in 1988. She was widowed in 1992.

After retiring, Warwick attended AAGPBL Players Association reunions. The association was largely responsible for the opening of Women in Baseball, a permanent display at the Baseball Hall of Fame and Museum in Cooperstown, New York, which was unveiled in 1988 to honor the entire All-American Girls Professional Baseball League.

In 1986 Warwick was inducted into the Saskatchewan Hall of Fame and Museum along with her brothers Claude, a professional boxer, and Grant, Richard, and William, all of them professional hockey players. Then, she was admitted into the Alberta Baseball Hall of Fame in 1991, and to the Canadian Baseball Hall of Fame and Museum in 1998.

Warwick died in 2006 in Edmonton, Alberta, at the age of 84.

== Career statistics ==
Batting

GP	AB	R	H	2B	3B	HR	RBI	SB	TB	BB	SO	BA	OBP	SLG
189	696	107	164	9	9	2	67	103	197	54	24	.236	.291	.283

Fielding

GP	PO	A	E	TC	DP	FA
185	361	553	112	1026	24	.891
