= All-American Girls Professional Baseball League All-Star Team =

An All-Star squad of players was selected by the team managers of the All-American Girls Professional Baseball League (AAGPBL) in the league's inaugural 1943 season and then from 1946 until the league folded in 1954.

The league's first All-Star Game was held on July 1, 1943. Played under temporary lights, it was the first night game ever played at Wrigley Field. The game was between two teams composed of Racine Belles and Kenosha Comets players against South Bend Blue Sox and Rockford Peaches players. At the end of the inaugural season the league selected an All-Star team composed of 15 players.

There is no evidence that an All-Star team was recognized during the 1944 and 1945 seasons.

Starting in 1946, the team's managers of the league selected a squad of All-Star players to recognize individual achievements and performances during the regular season. More than a hundred players received some recognition over nine seasons. The All-Star Team would play against the club with the best record in an exhibition game. Dorothy Kamenshek was named to the squad the most of all AAGPBL players with seven selections. Only five other players had at least five selections: Ruth Richard, Dorothy Harrell, Doris Sams, Fern Shollenberger, Maxine Kline (the only pitcher to do so).

== 1943 ==
Position	Player	Team
Pitchers	Margaret Berger	South Bend Blue Sox
Pitchers	Olive Little	Rockford Peaches
Pitchers	Mary Nesbitt	Racine Belles
Pitchers	Helen Nicol	Racine Belles
Catchers	Bonnie Baker	South Bend Blue Sox
Catchers	Irene Hickson	Racine Belles
First base	Dorothy Kamenshek	Rockford Peaches
Second base	Margaret Stefani	South Bend Blue Sox
Third base	Ann Harnett	Kenosha Comets
Shortstop	Gladys Davis	Rockford Peaches
Shortstop	Pauline Pirok	Kenosha Comets
Outfield	Eleanor Dapkus	Racine Belles
Outfield	Shirley Jameson	Kenosha Comets
Outfield	Edythe Perlick	Racine Belles
Outfield	Claire Schillace	Racine Belles

== 1944–1945 ==
- No All-Star teams

== 1946 ==
Position	Player	Team	Appearance
Pitchers	Anna Mae Hutchison	Racine Belles	
Pitchers	Carolyn Morris	Rockford Peaches	
Pitchers	Joanne Winter	Racine Belles	
Pitchers	Connie Wisniewski	Grand Rapids Chicks	
Catchers	Bonnie Baker	South Bend Blue Sox	2nd
Catchers	Ruth Lessing	Grand Rapids Chicks	
First base	Dorothy Kamenshek	Rockford Peaches	2nd
Second base	Sophie Kurys	Racine Belles	
Third base	Maddy English	Racine Belles	
Shortstop	Senaida Wirth	South Bend Blue Sox	
Outfield	Thelma Eisen	Rockford Peaches	
Outfield	Merle Keagle	Grand Rapids Chicks	
Outfield	Elizabeth Mahon	South Bend Blue Sox	

== 1947 ==
Position	Player	Team	Appearance
Pitchers	Mildred Earp	Grand Rapids Chicks	
Pitchers	Anna Mae Hutchison	Racine Belles	2nd
Pitchers	Dorothy Mueller	Peoria Redwings	
Pitchers	Doris Sams	Muskegon Lassies	
Catcher	Ruth Lessing	Grand Rapids Chicks	2nd
First base	Dorothy Kamenshek	Rockford Peaches	3rd
Second base	Sophie Kurys	Racine Belles	2nd
Third base	Mary Reynolds	Peoria Redwings	
Shortstop	Dorothy Harrell	Rockford Peaches	
Outfield	Josephine Lenard	Rockford Peaches	
Outfield	Edythe Perlick	Racine Belles	2nd
Outfield	Audrey Wagner	Kenosha Comets	

== 1948 ==
Position	Player	Team	Appearance
Pitchers	Lois Florreich	Rockford Peaches	
Pitchers	Alice Haylett	Grand Rapids Chicks	
Pitchers	Joanne Winter	Racine Belles	
Catcher	Ruth Lessing	Grand Rapids Chicks	3rd
First base	Dorothy Kamenshek	Rockford Peaches	4th
Second base	Sophie Kurys	Racine Belles	3rd
Third base	Maddy English	Racine Belles	2nd
Shortstop	Dorothy Harrell	Rockford Peaches	2nd
Outfield	Edythe Perlick	Racine Belles	3rd
Outfield	Audrey Wagner	Kenosha Comets	2nd
Outfield	Connie Wisniewski	Grand Rapids Chicks	2nd

== 1949 ==
Position	Player	Team	Appearance
Pitchers	Louise Erickson	Rockford Peaches	
Pitchers	Jean Faut	South Bend Blue Sox	
Pitchers	Lois Florreich	Rockford Peaches	2nd
Catchers	Ruth Richard	Rockford Peaches	
Catchers	Marge Villa	Kenosha Comets	
First base	Dorothy Kamenshek	Rockford Peaches	5th
Second base	Sophie Kurys	Racine Belles	4th
Third base	Maddy English	Racine Belles	3rd
Shortstop	Dorothy Harrell	Rockford Peaches	3rd
Outfield	Elizabeth Mahon	South Bend Blue Sox	2nd
Outfield	Doris Sams	Muskegon Lassies	2nd
Outfield	Connie Wisniewski	Grand Rapids Chicks	3rd

== 1950 ==
Position	Player	Team	Appearance
Pitchers	Louise Erickson	Rockford Peaches	2nd
Pitchers	Jean Faut	South Bend Blue Sox	2nd
Pitchers	Lois Florreich	Rockford Peaches	3rd
Pitchers	Maxine Kline	Fort Wayne Daisies	
Pitchers	Alma Ziegler	Grand Rapids Chicks	
Catcher	Ruth Richard	Rockford Peaches	2nd
First base	Dorothy Kamenshek	Rockford Peaches	6th
Second base	Evelyn Wawryshyn	Fort Wayne Daisies	
Third base	Fern Shollenberger	Kenosha Comets	
Shortstop	Dorothy Harrell	Rockford Peaches	4th
Infield utility	Marie Wegman	Fort Wayne Daisies	
Outfield	Jacquelyn Kelley	Rockford Peaches	
Outfield	Doris Sams	Kalamazoo Lassies	3rd
Outfield	Doris Satterfield	Grand Rapids Chicks	
Outfield	Betty Wagoner	South Bend Blue Sox	

== 1951 ==
Position	Player	Team	Appearance
Pitchers	Jean Faut	South Bend Blue Sox	3rd
Pitchers	Rose Gacioch	Rockford Peaches	
Pitchers	Maxine Kline	Fort Wayne Daisies	2nd
Catcher	Ruth Richard	Rockford Peaches	3rd
First base	Dorothy Kamenshek	Rockford Peaches	7th
Second base	Charlene Pryer	South Bend Blue Sox	
Third base	Fern Shollenberger	Kenosha Comets	2nd
Shortstop	Alice Pollitt	Racine Belles	
Outfield	Eleanor Callow	Rockford Peaches	
Outfield	Doris Sams	Kalamazoo Lassies	4th
Outfield	Connie Wisniewski	Grand Rapids Chicks	4th

== 1952 ==
Position	Player	Team	Appearance
Pitchers	Jean Cione	Battle Creek Belles	
Pitchers	Gloria Cordes	Kalamazoo Lassies	
Pitchers	Rose Gacioch	Rockford Peaches	2nd
Pitchers	Maxine Kline	Fort Wayne Daisies	3rd
Pitchers	Alma Ziegler	Grand Rapids Chicks	2nd
Catchers	Rita Briggs	Battle Creek Belles	
Catchers	Ruth Richard	Rockford Peaches	4th
Catchers	Jenny Romatowski	Kalamazoo Lassies	
First base	Betty Foss	Fort Wayne Daisies	
Second base	Joan Berger	Rockford Peaches	
Third base	Fern Shollenberger	Kenosha Comets	3rd
Shortstop	Dorothy Schroeder	Fort Wayne Daisies	
Infield utility	Dorothy Harrell	Rockford Peaches	5th
Infield utility	Barbara Hoffman	South Bend Blue Sox	
Infield utility	Alice Pollitt	Rockford Peaches	2nd
Outfield	Eleanor Callow	Rockford Peaches	2nd
Outfield	Doris Sams	Kalamazoo Lassies	5th
Outfield	Joanne Weaver	Fort Wayne Daisies	

== 1953 ==
Position	Player	Team	Appearance
Pitchers	Jean Faut	South Bend Blue Sox	4th
Pitchers	Rose Gacioch	Rockford Peaches	3rd
Pitchers	Maxine Kline	Fort Wayne Daisies	4th
Pitchers	Eleanor Moore	Grand Rapids Chicks	
Pitchers	Earlene Risinger	Grand Rapids Chicks	
Catchers	Mary Baumgartner	South Bend Blue Sox	
Catchers	Jean Lovell	Kalamazoo Lassies	
Catchers	Ruth Richard	Rockford Peaches	5th
Catchers	Jenny Romatowski	Kalamazoo Lassies	2nd
Catchers	Kathryn Vonderau	Muskegon Belles	
First base	Betty Foss	Fort Wayne Daisies	2nd
First base	June Peppas	Kalamazoo Lassies	
Second base	Jean Geissinger	Fort Wayne Daisies	
Second base	Alma Ziegler	Grand Rapids Chicks	3rd
Third base	Katie Horstman	Fort Wayne Daisies	
Third base	Fern Shollenberger	Kalamazoo Lassies	4th
Shortstop	Margaret Russo	Muskegon Belles	
Shortstop	Dorothy Schroeder	Kalamazoo Lassies	2nd
Infield utility	Marguerite Pearson	South Bend Blue Sox	
Outfield	Eleanor Callow	Rockford Peaches	3rd
Outfield	Joyce Ricketts	Grand Rapids Chicks	
Outfield	Jenny Romatowski	Kalamazoo Lassies	2nd
Outfield	Doris Satterfield	Grand Rapids Chicks	2nd
Outfield	Jane Stoll	Kalamazoo Lassies	
Outfield	Betty Wagoner	South Bend Blue Sox	2nd
Outfield	Joanne Weaver	Fort Wayne Daisies	2nd

== 1954 ==
Position	Player	Team	Appearance
Pitchers	Gloria Cordes	Kalamazoo Lassies	2nd
Pitchers	Maxine Kline	Fort Wayne Daisies	5th
Pitchers	Janet Rumsey	South Bend Blue Sox	
Pitchers	Nancy Warren	Kalamazoo Lassies	
Catcher	Ruth Richard	Rockford Peaches	6th
First base	June Peppas	Kalamazoo Lassies	2nd
Second base	Jean Geissinger	Fort Wayne Daisies	2nd
Second base	Alma Ziegler	Grand Rapids Chicks	4th
Third base	Fern Shollenberger	Kalamazoo Lassies	5th
Infield	Margaret Russo	Rockford Peaches	2nd
Infield	Dorothy Schroeder	Kalamazoo Lassies	3rd
Outfield	Wilma Briggs	South Bend Blue Sox	
Outfield	Eleanor Callow	Rockford Peaches	4th
Outfield	Joyce Ricketts	Grand Rapids Chicks	2nd
Outfield	Doris Satterfield	Grand Rapids Chicks	3rd
Outfield	Joanne Weaver	Fort Wayne Daisies	3rd
