= Dorothy Wind =

American baseball player

- Shortstop
- Born: Chicago, Illinois, U.S.
- Died: August 25, 2010
- Batted: Right Threw: Right

Teams
- Racine Belles (1943–1944)

Career highlights and awards
- Championship Team (1943); Set all-time record for the most hits in a single game (1943)

Dorothy Wind [״Dottie״] (died August 25, 2010) was an American shortstop who played from 1943 through 1944 in the All-American Girls Professional Baseball League (AAGPBL). Listed at 5 ft 6 in (1.68 m), 128 lb., she batted and threw right-handed.

Born in Chicago, Illinois, Dorothy Wind was one of the sixty founding members of the All-American Girls Professional Baseball League in its inaugural season. She also played basketball and volleyball before joining the league with the Racine Belles, a team managed by former big leaguer Johnny Gottselig.

A defending shortstop, Wind formed part of a Racine infield that included Margaret Danhauser at first base, Sophie Kurys at second base and Maddy English at third base.

In 1943 Wind batted a .255 average and stole 36 bases, driving in 44 runs and scoring 56 times, while connecting four doubles, seven triples and two home runs. She finished 7th in RBI, tied for 6th in triples and tied for 11th in homers. But her career highlight came on August 28, when she set the league all-time record with six hits in a single game. The Belles swept the Kenosha Comets in the championship series, three games to zero.

Wind attended college in the off-season. She hit .240 in 1944, but did not return for the next year.

== Career statistics ==
Batting

GP	AB	R	H	2B	3B	HR	RBI	SB	TB	BB	SO	BA	OBP	SLG
144	529	85	132	8	11	2	63	64	168	35	22	.250	.296	.318

Fielding

GP	PO	A	E	TC	DP	FA
144	227	497	103	827	23	.876
