= Gloria Marks =

Gloria W. Marks
- Pitcher
- Born: 1923 (age 102–103); San Diego, California, U.S.
- Bats: Right Throws: Right

Teams
- Racine Belles (1943)

Career highlights and awards
- Championship Team (1943)

Gloria W. Marks (born 1923) is an American former baseball pitcher who played in the All-American Girls Professional Baseball League (AAGPBL) during the 1943 season. Listed at 5 ft 6 in (1.68 m), 130 lb, she batted and threw right-handed.

Gloria Marks was one of the sixty original players recruited by the All-American Girls Professional Baseball League for its inaugural season.

Born in San Diego, California, she pitched for several championship teams in her native San Diego before joining the league.

Marks was assigned to the Racine Belles, a team managed by former big leaguer Johnny Gottselig, as part of a pitching staff headed by Mary Nesbitt and Joanne Winter.

In her only season in the league, Marks helped win Racine the regular season title and the championship after going 11–9 for a .550 winning percentage. She also helped herself with the bat, connecting seven of her 18 hits for extra bases, to collect a very solid .471 slugging average.

Since 1988 she is part of Women in Baseball, a permanent display based at the Baseball Hall of Fame and Museum in Cooperstown, New York, which was unveiled to honor the entire All-American Girls Professional Baseball League.

== Career statistics ==
Pitching

| GP | W | L | W-L% | ERA | IP | H | RA | ER | BB | SO | HB | WP | WHIP |
|---|---|---|---|---|---|---|---|---|---|---|---|---|---|
| 29 | 11 | 9 | .550 | 4.05 | 166 | 145 | 125 | 75 | 117 | 29 | 4 | 22 | 1.58 |

Batting

| GP | AB | R | H | 2B | 3B | HR | RBI | SB | TB | BB | SO | BA | OBP | SLG |
|---|---|---|---|---|---|---|---|---|---|---|---|---|---|---|
| 33 | 68 | 9 | 18 | 4 | 2 | 1 | 7 | 2 | 32 | 7 | 11 | .265 | .333 | .471 |

Fielding

| GP | PO | A | E | TC | FA |
|---|---|---|---|---|---|
| 29 | 18 | 63 | 15 | 96 | .944 |
