= Betty Jane Fritz =

Baseball player (1924–1994)

- Outfielder
- Born: October 14, 1924; Oshkosh, Wisconsin, U.S.
- Died: August 11, 1994 (aged 69); Solon Springs, Wisconsin, U.S.
- Batted: Right Threw: Right
- Stats at Baseball Reference

Teams
- Rockford Peaches (1943)

Career highlights and awards
- Women in Baseball – AAGPBL Permanent Display at Baseball Hall of Fame and Museum (1988)

Betty Jane Fritz (October 14, 1924 – August 11, 1994) was a center fielder who played in the All-American Girls Professional Baseball League (AAGPBL) during the 1943 season. Listed at 5 ft 5 in (1.65 m), 130 lb., she batted and threw right-handed.

Born in Oshkosh, Wisconsin, Fritz was one of the sixty founding members of the All-American Girls Professional Baseball League. A good-hitting outfielder, she played one season for the Rockford Peaches, a team managed by Eddie Stumpf. She batted a .210 average and tied for eighth in the league for the most runs batted in (43). Besides this, she tied Betsy Jochum of the South Bend Blue Sox for the most outfield assists (17), being surpassed only by Racine Belles' Eleanor Dapkus (19).

== Career statistics ==
Batting

| GP | AB | R | H | 2B | 3B | HR | RBI | SB | TB | BB | SO | BA | OBP | SLG |
|---|---|---|---|---|---|---|---|---|---|---|---|---|---|---|
| 98 | 348 | 38 | 73 | 4 | 1 | 0 | 43 | 29 | 79 | 9 | 16 | .210 | .230 | .227 |

Fielding

| GP | PO | A | E | TC | DP | FA |
|---|---|---|---|---|---|---|
| 98 | 152 | 17 | 9 | 178 | 4 | .949 |
