= Josephine D'Angelo =

- Outfield
- Born: November 23, 1924; Chicago, Illinois, U.S.
- Died: August 18, 2013 (aged 88); Park Ridge, Illinois, U.S.
- Batted: Right Threw: Right

Teams
- South Bend Blue Sox (1943–1944)

Career highlights and awards
- All-Star Game (1943); Set all-time record for the fewest strikeouts in a season (1943); Women in Baseball – AAGPBL Permanent Display at Baseball Hall of Fame and Museum (1988)

Josephine "Jo Jo" D'Angelo (November 23, 1924 – August 18, 2013) was an American baseball left fielder who played from 1943 through 1944 in the All-American Girls Professional Baseball League (AAGPBL). Listed at 5 ft 0 in (152 cm), 135 lb, she batted and threw right-handed.

She was one of the sixty original players to join the AAGPBL for its inaugural season. D'Angelo set an all-time record in the league for the fewest strikeouts in a single season. As an outfielder, she had sure hands and a strong and accurate arm for balls up the middle and double plays.

== Life ==
Born in Chicago, Illinois, D'Angelo grew up playing sandlot ball with her neighborhood kids at an early age, most of them boys, but did not start participating in an organized league until she was at high school. At the age of 13, she put on her first uniform with the De Young Floral on the southside of Chicago. The next year she joined the Raab Taylors and received a symbolic emolument as a player, when they paid her $1.00 a night for playing for the team.

Following her graduation at Harper High School, D'Angelo took her first job at age 18, working in the steel mills from 1942 to 1943. The money the young steel worker received allowed her to make a down payment toward college savings. By the time, Philip K. Wrigley, founder of the All-American Girls Professional Baseball League, had scouts all over the United States and Canada signing girls for tryouts. About 500 of them attended the call. Of these, only 280 were invited to the final try-outs at Wrigley Field in Chicago where 60 were chosen to become the first women to ever play professional baseball. D'Angelo was one of them, and was assigned to the South Bend Blue Sox. The other founding teams were the Kenosha Comets, Racine Belles and Rockford Peaches.

D'Angelo batted a .221 average with a .324 on-base percentage and 53 stolen bases in her rookie season. She appeared in a team second best 104 games, driving in 38 runs while scoring 62 times. She also finished ninth in the league in stolen bases and tied for seventh in runs scored. In a moment of the season, she made the headlines after hitting a home run to win a game for the Blue Sox.

But D'Angelo developed prestige as the best contact hitter around when she struck out only three times in 358 at bats (once every 119.3 at-bats) to set an all-time single season record.

She also appeared in the first AAGPBL All-Star Game on July 1, 1943, which coincidentally became the first night game ever played at Wrigley Field. The contest was played under temporary lights between two teams composed of Kenosha and Racine players against Rockford and South Bend players.

D'Angelo's contract was not renewed after the 1944 season. She later attributed this to a "butchy haircut" she was convinced to get by a hairstylist. She next signed a contract with the National Girls Baseball League of Chicago. On the other hand, she continued her college education and obtained a bachelor's degree from DePaul University. She became a physical education teacher and later received a master's degree from Chicago State University, spanning a 34-year career in the Chicago Public Schools system until her retirement in 1980. This led to her working for ten years as a guidance counselor. In her spare time she enjoyed playing golf and actively contributed to society by volunteering in her community, but a knee replacement surgery in 1992 made her less mobile.

Since 1988 she is part of Women in Baseball, a permanent display based at the Baseball Hall of Fame and Museum in Cooperstown, New York, which was unveiled to honor the entire All-American Girls Professional Baseball League. She died in 2013, aged 88, in Park Ridge, Illinois. D'Angelo was a lesbian.

== Career statistics ==
Batting

GP	AB	R	H	2B	3B	HR	RBI	SB	TB	BB	SO	BA	OBP	SLG
144	499	73	100	9	2	2	47	62	119	67	11	.200	.295	.238

Fielding

GP	PO	A	E	TC	DP	FA
144	204	27	11	242	8	.955
