= Ruth Born =

American baseball player (1925–2020)

- Pitcher
- Born: August 8, 1925; Bay City, Michigan, U.S.
- Died: March 10, 2020 (aged 94)
- Batted: Right Threw: Right

Teams
- South Bend Blue Sox (1943)

Career highlights and awards
- Women in Baseball — AAGPBL Permanent Display at National Baseball Hall of Fame and Museum (1988)

Ruth L. Born (August 8, 1925 – March 10, 2020) was an American baseball player who was a pitcher in the All-American Girls Professional Baseball League (AAGPBL). Listed at 5 ft 3 in (1.60 m), 125 lb, she batted and threw right-handed.

Ruth Born was one of the original South Bend Blue Sox founding members of the All-American Girls Professional Baseball League for its inaugural season in 1943.

A native of Bay City, Michigan, Born grew up playing sandlot ball with her neighborhood kids at an early age, most of them boys, but did not start participating in an organized league until she was 12 years old, playing at school and in park softball leagues. At the age of 13, she put on her first uniform with a Moose Lodge team.

In 1943, she read an advertisement in the local newspaper offering girls an opportunity to try out for the All-American Girls Professional Baseball League. She wrote the office and was given a tryout in South Bend, Indiana after the season had begun. She made the grade and was accepted on the local team.

Born pitched in just 11 games, going 4–5 with a tenth best earned run average of 3.59. But she did not feel comfortable in the new circuit. "I was in over my head", she explained in an interview. Nevertheless, she added that the best thing about playing professional ball was being paid to do what she loved. "I enjoyed every minute!", she boasted.

She did not return in 1944 and chose to attend college. She earned a bachelor's degree from Valparaiso University and attained a master's degree in psychiatric social work from Loyola University Chicago. Then she went to work for private social agencies in child welfare and family services. She retired from the United States Department of Health and Human Services in 1991 after 23 years of services.

Ruth Born is part of Women in Baseball, a permanent display based at the National Baseball Hall of Fame and Museum in Cooperstown, New York, which was unveiled in 1988 to honor the entire All-American Girls Professional Baseball League.

Born died on March 10, 2020, at the age of 94.

== Career statistics ==
Pitching

| GP | W | L | W-L% | ERA | IP | H | RA | ER | BB | SO | WP | HBP | WHIP |
|---|---|---|---|---|---|---|---|---|---|---|---|---|---|
| 11 | 4 | 5 | .444 | 3.59 | 67 | 61 | 47 | 27 | 47 | 6 | 7 | 1 | 1.61 |

Batting

| GP | AB | R | H | 2B | 3B | HR | RBI | SB | BB | SO | AVE | OBP |
|---|---|---|---|---|---|---|---|---|---|---|---|---|
| 11 | 18 | 1 | 2 | 0 | 0 | 0 | 3 | 0 | BB | SO | .111 | .200 |

Fielding

| GP | PO | A | E | TC | DP | FA |
|---|---|---|---|---|---|---|
| 11 | 5 | 15 | 2 | 22 | 1 | .909 |
