= Gladys Davis (baseball) =

Canadian baseball player (1919–1991)

- Shortstop / Outfield / Second base
- Born: Gladys Victoria Anthony; September 1, 1919; Toronto, Ontario, Canada
- Died: October 26, 1991 (aged 72); Fort Erie, Ontario, Canada
- Batted: Right Threw: Right

Teams
- Rockford Peaches (1943–1944); Milwaukee Chicks (1944); Muskegon Lassies (1946)

Career highlights and awards
- AAGPBL All-Star Team (1943); AAGPBL champion (1944); AAGPBL batting champion (1943)

Gladys Victoria "Terrie" Davis Smith (née Anthony; September 1, 1919 – October 26, 1991) was a Canadian shortstop and outfielder who played in the All-American Girls Professional Baseball League between the 1943 and 1946 seasons. Listed at 5' 5", 130 lb., Davis batted and threw right handed. Born in Toronto, Ontario, Davis was one of numerous Canadians to join the league in its first season in 1943. Behind strong pitching, Davis was the only batter to hit .300 that year and won the batting title.

== Career ==
Terrie Davis was one of the 68 players born in Canada to join the All-American Girls Professional Baseball League in its twelve years history. She was among the top players in the early years of the circuit, winning the first batting champion title in 1943, being selected to the first All-Star Game, and as a member of the champion team in 1944. Noted for her enthusiastic and great knowledge of the game, she excelled defensively at shortstop, second base and all three outfield positions. Basically a line-drive hitter, she had a compact swing and tremendous plate discipline, collecting a significant .336 on-base percentage and a 2.05 walk-to-strikeout ratio (113-to-55) in a span of three years.

The All-American Girls Professional Baseball League operated from 1943 through 1954 and started with four teams: the Racine Belles and the Kenosha Comets, both from Wisconsin; the Rockford Peaches from Illinois, and the South Bend Blue Sox from Indiana. League play officially began on May 30, 1943 with the teams Kenosha Comets, Racine Belles, Rockford Peaches and South Bend Blue Sox. Each team was made up of fifteen girls.

Davis joined the Rockford team to become one of the sixty original founding members of the league. Her hitting was good enough to win the batting title win a .331 average in 102 games. She also led the league in total bases (155), finished second in hits (116), four behind South Bend's Betsy Jochum, and ranked third in home runs (4), runs batted in (58) and runs scored (78), while tying for second in triples (10). During the midseason took effect the first All-Star Game of the league, which coincidentally became the first night game ever played at Wrigley Field (July 1, 1943). The contest was played under temporary lights between two teams composed of Belles and Comets players against Blue Sox and Peaches players. At the end of the season, she was selected to the All-Star Team.

By 1944 the AAGPBL added two teams, the Milwaukee Chicks and the Minneapolis Millerettes. Davis divided her playing time between Rockford and Milwaukee, hitting a combined .246 average with 42 runs and 34 RBI in 80 games. The Chicks then went on to win the championship, beating Kenosha in the best-of-seven series behind a strong pitching effort by Connie Wisniewski, who went 4–1 with a 0.40 ERA in five complete games, while Davis led the team with a .333 average (9-for-27), three runs, three RBI, and eight stolen bases.

== Personal life and death ==
Davis was married and had a child before joining the league. She missed the 1945 season and returned with the expansion Muskegon Lassies during the 1946 midseason. She dropped to .202 in 58 games, driving in 31 runs while scoring 22 times, during what turned out to be her AAGPBL final season.

After retiring, Davis focused on her family and interior designing business in Toronto. She died in Fort Erie, Ontario on October 26, 1991, at the age of 72. In 1998, the Canadian Baseball Hall of Fame recognized with the Canadian-born players of the league with a collective induction. She is also part of the AAGPBL permanent display at the Baseball Hall of Fame and Museum at Cooperstown, New York, opened in 1988, which is dedicated to the entire league rather than any individual personalities.

== Career statistics ==
Batting

GP	AB	R	H	2B	3B	HR	RBI	SB	BB	SO	BA	OBP	SLG
240	819	142	223	19	11	5	123	137	113	55	.272	.336	.341

Fielding

GP	PO	A	E	TC	DP	FA
117	353	492	115	960	29	.880
