= Clara Cook =

American baseball player

- Photo courtesy of Tri-Counties Genealogy and History
- Pitcher
- Born: June 19, 1921; Pine City, New York, U.S.
- Died: July 23, 1996 (aged 75); Elmira, New York, U.S.
- Batted: Left Threw: Left
- Stats at Baseball Reference

Teams
- Rockford Peaches (1943); Kenosha Comets (1943–1944); Milwaukee Chicks (1944)

Career highlights and awards
- Championship team (1944); Metro-Elmira Sports Hall of Fame induction (1975); Women in Baseball – AAGPBL Permanent Display at Baseball Hall of Fame and Museum (1988)

Clara Ruth Cook [״Babe״] (June 19, 1921 – July 23, 1996) was an American pitcher who played from 1943 through 1944 in the All-American Girls Professional Baseball League (AAGPBL). Listed at 5 ft 2 in (1.57 m), 130 lb., she batted and threw left-handed.

A fastpitch left hander, Clara Cook was one of the sixty founding members of the All-American Girls Professional Baseball League for its inaugural season in 1943. Cook spent two seasons in the AAGPBL with three different teams, including the championship team in 1944.

Born in Pine City, New York, Clara was the youngest of eleven children into the family of John H. and Clara B. Cook. This is why she was called "Babe" most of the time. She spent her schooling days at Pine City School, but after school she accustomed to play baseball with her brothers. She later moved with her family to Elmira, New York.

In the early thirties, a Remington Rand employee named Riley saw Clara while playing sandlot ball with her brothers and some friends. He found out who she was and went to her home and asked her parents if she could play on the Rand baseball team. At first, her parents asked her if she would like to play baseball for an organized team, and she replied affirmatively. Clara was excited, as she had a great love for playing ball, and only being 13 years old, she knew this was a great opportunity. Then her parents gave her full permission to play ball, and Mr. Riley accordingly brought her to and from the games.

After graduating from Southside High School, Cook went to work at the Remington Rand plant, where she also helped organize friends to play ball for the company. She was spotted by an AAGPBL scout in one of those friendly matches. He invited her to join the new league, and after a tryout, she signed her official contract to play in the inaugural season of the league.

Cook entered the league in 1943 with the Rockford Peaches, playing for them in part of the season before joining the Kenosha Comets. But she did not have much success on the pitching mound. She posted a composite record of 6–17 in 30 games, allowing more runs (177, 100 earned) than any other pitcher to finish with a 4.42 ERA. A hard worker, she pitched 203 innings for the ninth-best mark in the league.

Cook opened 1944 with Kenosha, but was traded to the Milwaukee Chicks during the midseason. That year she was converted into a reliever and pitched better, going 2–2 with a 3.40 ERA in 45 innings of work. She was ready to help the Chicks in the playoffs. Milwaukee defeated the Kenosha Comets in the best-of-seven series, and it took all seven games for the Chicks to be declared the champion team. Cook gave up an unearned run over one inning and did not have a decision.

At the end of the season, Cook returned to Elmira and to Remington Rand. She worked in there until 1955, when Sperry Corporation acquired the Elmira's plant and renamed itself Sperry Rand. She then moved to California and worked at an aircraft company until she retired.

After returning home, Cook continued to encourage and organize teams in Elmira. She also helped by coaching young women interested in pitching.

In 1975, Cook was inducted into the Metro-Elmira Sports Hall of Fame. She is also part of Women in Baseball, a permanent display based at the Baseball Hall of Fame and Museum in Cooperstown, New York, which was unveiled in 1988 to honor the entire All-American Girls Professional Baseball League.

Clara Cook died in Elmira, New York, at the age of 75. She was buried in the Webbs Mills Cemetery, along with her parents.

== Career statistics ==
Pitching

GP	W	L	W-L%	ERA	IP	H	RA	ER	BB	SO	WP	HBP	WHIP
39	8	19	.296	4.25	248	255	201	117	68	33	2	8	1.30

Batting

GP	AB	R	H	2B	3B	HR	RBI	SB	BB	SO	BA	OBP
49	102	9	16	2	0	0	9	4	17	10	.157	.277

Fielding

GP	PO	A	E	TC	DP	FA
39	15	45	5	65	1	.923
