= 1946 Japanese Baseball League season =

- League: Japanese Baseball League
- Sport: Baseball

Regular season
- Season MVP: Kazuto Yamamoto (Great Ring)
- Finals champions: Great Ring
- Runners-up: Tokyo Kyojin

Japanese Baseball League seasons
- ← 1944 1947 →

The 1946 Japanese Baseball League season was the 11th edition of Japanese Baseball League after being established in 1936.

== Standings ==
Team	W	L	T	Pct.	GB
Great Ring	65	38	2	.631	-
Tokyo Kyojin	64	39	2	.621	1.0
Osaka Tigers	59	46	0	.562	7.0
Hankyu	51	52	2	.495	14.0
Senators	47	58	0	.448	19.0
Gold Star	43	60	2	.417	22.0
Chubu Nippon	42	60	3	.412	22.5
Pacific	42	60	3	.412	22.5

== League leaders ==
Batting leaders
Stat	Player	Team	Total
Batting average	Masayasu Kaneda	Osaka Tigers	.347
Home runs	Hiroshi Ohshita	Senators	20
Runs batted in	Kazuto Yamamoto	Great Ring	95
Hits	Masayasu Kaneda	Osaka Tigers	152
Stolen bases	Toshio Kawanishi	Great Ring	39

Pitching leaders
Stat	Player	Team	Total
Wins	Giichiro Shiraki	Senators	30
Earned run average	Hideo Fujimoto	Tokyo Kyojin	2.11
Strikeouts	Juzo Sanada	Pacific	200

== See also ==
- 1946 All-American Girls Professional Baseball League season
- 1946 Major League Baseball season
