= Marjorie Peters =

American baseball player (1918–2016)

- Pitcher
- Born: September 11, 1918; Greenfield, Wisconsin, U.S.
- Died: April 1, 2016 (aged 97); West Allis, Wisconsin, U.S.
- Batted: Right Threw: Right

Teams
- Rockford Peaches (1943–1944)

Career highlights and awards
- Women in Baseball – AAGPBL Permanent Display at Baseball Hall of Fame and Museum (1988)

Marjorie L. Peters (September 11, 1918 – April 1, 2016) was an American baseball player. She was a pitcher who played from 1943 to 1944 in the All-American Girls Professional Baseball League (AAGPBL). Listed at 5 ft 2 in (1.57 m), 112 pounds (51 kg), she batted and threw right-handed.

Marjorie Peters was one of the sixty original players to join the All-American Girls Professional Baseball League for its inaugural season. She also has the distinction of having pitched the first ball in the first game ever played in the league.

Born in Greenfield, Wisconsin, Peters started to play softball as a seven-year-old in the parks of her homeland. Known as the athlete of her family, she was a tennis star, speed skater and bike racer as a young girl. During World War II she went to work at a Defense Logistics Agency. Her interest in sports led her to attend an AAGPBL tryout at Borchert Field in Milwaukee and she was invited to the final tryout at Wrigley Field in Chicago. She made the final cuts and was assigned to the Rockford Peaches, playing for them two seasons.

In the first game of the new league on May 30, 1943, Peters pitched against the South Bend Blue Sox in what ended up being a 14-inning game won by South Bend 4–3. She finished her rookie season with a 12–19 record and a 3.10 earned run average in 39 games, ranking sixth in complete games (24) and innings pitched (270), seventh in wins, and eighth in ERA. She also helped herself with the bat, compiling a .200 batting average (25-for-125) and one home run, driving in nine runs while scoring 24 times.

Marjorie was used sparingly in 1944 and retired after marrying Donald Beane at the end of the season. Her marriage lasted until 1948. She also helped organize a professional softball league in Milwaukee that included her club, the Milwaukee Jets, which allowed her to play for a few years. In addition, she raised minks and worked at Singer Controls, retiring in 1993. She had two hip replacements after that, leaving her with a limp for the rest of her life.

She is part of Women in Baseball, a permanent display based at the Baseball Hall of Fame and Museum in Cooperstown, New York, which was unveiled to honor the entire All-American Girls Professional Baseball League in 1988.

Marjorie Peters later became a long time resident of West Allis, Wisconsin, where she was invited to throw out the inaugural first pitch at a game of the VMP Super Senior Softball League in August 2015 at McCarty Park. She died in April 2016 at the age of 97.

== Career statistics ==
Pitching

| GP | W | L | W-L% | ERA | IP | H | RA | ER | BB | SO | WHIP |
|---|---|---|---|---|---|---|---|---|---|---|---|
| 48 | 13 | 24 | .351 | 3.15 | 340 | 347 | 203 | 119 | 70 | 35 | 1.23 |

Batting

| GP | AB | R | H | 2B | 3B | HR | RBI | SB | BB | SO | BA | OBP | SLG |
|---|---|---|---|---|---|---|---|---|---|---|---|---|---|
| 70 | 148 | 27 | 31 | 1 | 2 | 1 | 21 | 21 | 9 | 14 | .209 | .255 | .264 |

Fielding

| GP | PO | A | E | TC | DP | FA |
|---|---|---|---|---|---|---|
| 48 | 21 | 53 | 4 | 78 | DP | .949 |
