= Hollister, Florida =

Unincorporated community in Florida, U.S.

Hollister is an unincorporated community in Putnam County, Florida, United States. It is located off State Road 20, between Interlachen and Palatka. The ZIP Code for Hollister is 32147.

== Geography ==
Hollister is located at 29°37′21″N 81°48′50″W (29.6225, -81.8139).
