= Eileen Burmeister =

American baseball player (1924-1990)

- Utility Player
- Born: November 30, 1924; Milwaukee, Wisconsin, U.S.
- Died: February 1, 1990 (aged 65); Fall River, Wisconsin, U.S.
- Batted: Left Threw: Right

Teams
- Rockford Peaches (1943–1944)

Career highlights and awards
- Women in Baseball – AAGPBL Permanent Display at Baseball Hall of Fame and Museum (1988)

Eileen Dean (née Burmeister, November 30, 1924 – February 1, 1990) played eight defensive positions for the Rockford Peaches in the All-American Girls Professional Baseball League (AAGPBL). Listed at 5' 5", 140 lb., she batted left-handed and threw right-handed.

== Career statistics ==
Batting

GP	AB	R	H	2B	3B	HR	RBI	SB	TB	BB	SO	BA	OBP	SLG
167	571	57	113	10	11	0	60	27	145	62	46	.198	.276	.254

Fielding

GP	PO	A	E	TC	DP	FA
167	212	229	52	493	8	.895
