= Claire Schillace =

Racine Belles – No. 10
- Center fielder
- Born: March 29, 1921; Melrose Park, Illinois, U.S.
- Died: January 17, 1999 (aged 77); Bethesda, Maryland, U.S.
- Batted: Right Threw: Left

Career statistics
- Batting average: .202
- Home runs: 2
- Runs batted in: 112
- Stolen bases: 153
- Stats at Baseball Reference

Teams
- Racine Belles (1943–1946)

Career highlights and awards
- AAGPBL Championship Team (1943); All-Star Team (1943); Women in Baseball – AAGPBL Permanent Display at Baseball Hall of Fame and Museum (1988)

Claire Joan Schillace (March 29, 1921 – January 17, 1999) was a center fielder who played from 1943 through 1946 in the All-American Girls Professional Baseball League (AAGPBL). Listed at 5' 3", 128 lb., she batted right-handed and threw left-handed.

== AAGPBL career ==
A native of Melrose Park, Illinois, Schillace attended Northern Illinois University. She played softball in a Chicago league and was a member of the Illinois state and Chicago city championship teams. She impressed the AAGPBL scouts with her speedy baserunning and fielding skills. After receiving a tryout invitation, she became one of the first four players signed by the league for its inaugural season, joining Ann Harnett, Shirley Jameson and Edythe Perlick.

Schillace spent four years in the league, all with the Racine Belles. She had an outstanding rookie season, hitting a career-high .251 average, being selected to the All-Star Team, and as member of the 1943 Belles Championship Team. During her career, she posted a .202 average and stole 153 bases.

Following her baseball career, Schillace completed her studies and earned a master's degree in education. After being married, she changed her name to Claire Schillace Donahoe. She and her husband had four children, three boys and a girl. For many years she worked as an educator in Maryland.

Claire served as a consultant for A League of Their Own, the 1992 film about the AAGPBL starring Geena Davis and Madonna, both of whom were novices to the sport. At one point, director Penny Marshall told Claire to teach Madonna "everything you know about baseball in a half an hour".

== Milestones ==
In November 1988, Claire, along with her current teammates and opponents were dedicated in the Baseball Hall of Fame and Museum in Cooperstown, New York with a permanent display to the All American Girls Professional Baseball League.

Claire died in Bethesda, Maryland at the age of 77, following complications from a blood clot.
