= Sophie Kurys =

American baseball player (1925–2013

- Second base
- Born: May 14, 1925; Flint, Michigan, U.S.
- Died: February 17, 2013 (aged 87); Scottsdale, Arizona, U.S.
- Batted: Right Threw: Right

Career statistics
- Batting average: .260
- Hits: 859
- Home runs: 22
- Runs batted in: 279
- Stolen bases: 1,114

Teams
- Racine Belles (1943–1951); Battle Creek Belles (1952)

Career highlights and awards
- 2× AAGPBL champion (1943, 1946); AAGPBL Player of the Year Award (1946); 4× AAGPBL All-Star Team (1946–1949); 7× AAGPBL stolen base leader (1944–1950); 6× AAGPBL run leader (1944, 1946–1950); AAGPBL records: 1,114 career stolen bases; 688 career runs

Sophie Mary Kurys (May 14, 1925 – February 17, 2013), nicknamed "Tina Cobb" and "the Flint Flash", was an American professional baseball second basewoman who played from 1943 through 1952 in the All-American Girls Professional Baseball League (AAGPBL). Listed at 5 ft 5 in (1.65 m), 115 lb (52 kg), Kurys batted and threw right-handed.

An offensive dynamo, Kurys set numerous league records with her speed while being part of two league championship teams. The 1946 season saw her set league records that were never broken for runs scored in a season (117), stolen bases (201), and walks (93) on her way to winning the league MVP; she also holds the record for most runs scored in a game (5) and jointly holds the record for most stolen bases in a game with seven.

== Career ==
A native of Flint, Michigan, Kurys was by far the greatest base stealer in the All-American Girls Professional Baseball League history. She was nicknamed Tina Cobb or the Flint Flash for her swiftness in stealing bases, because once she reached base she was virtually unstoppable. Eighty percent of the time she stole at least one base, averaging 150 steals per season between 1944 and 1950, with a career-high 201 in 1946.

She also amassed a World Record with a career 1,114 stolen bases, more than Ty Cobb (892), and later more than both Lou Brock (938) and Japanese star Yutaka Fukumoto (1,065), until her mark was surpassed by Rickey Henderson in 1994. Her 201 stolen bases in a single season still stands as a professional record, collecting 71 more than Henderson (130), who set the Major League Baseball single-season record in 1982. But like many of her colleagues, Kurys was relatively unknown until the 1992 film A League of Their Own by filmmaker Penny Marshall was exhibited for the first time.

A well-rounded athlete, at the age of 14, Kurys scored a record-setting 4,693 points out of 5,000 in the Mott Pentathlon. That year, she was also Most Valuable Player of the Michigan State Basketball Tournament at Lansing. In addition, she was a competent infielder at shortstop and third base in fastpitch softball. Kurys did not even play second base until joining the All-American Girls Professional Baseball League, yet she immediately became the best in the game at the position.

A founding member of the AAGPBL when it was organized in 1943, Kurys entered the league with the Racine Belles, playing for them for eight years. Her most productive season came in 1946, when she reached base 215 times and stole 201 bases in 203 attempts, while hitting a .286 batting average with league-leads in runs (117) and on-base percentage (.434). She also set season-league records with 93 walks in 113 games and for fielding percentage by a second baseman, at .973, being named Player of the Year. In addition to her 1946 campaign, Kurys capped the season as the top hitter in the playoffs and stole five bases in the 16-inning, title-winning Game Six against the Rockford Peaches, where she singled in the bottom of the 13th, stole second, then hustled home with the winning run on a short single by Betty Trezza.

Before the 1951 season, when the team moved from Racine, Wisconsin, to Battle Creek, Michigan, Kurys, Eleanor Dapkus, Maddy English, Edythe Perlick and Joanne Winter, among some original members of the Belles, were disappointed and decided not to make the move. During eight years, the Belles were a close-knit team, always like a family and often away from home. Kurys and her teammates thought that too much would change, and did not like the ideas of a new team, a new manager and, especially, a new location. Nevertheless, Kurys reconsidered the decision and joined the Battle Creek Belles club in 1952. She played in 17 games before she was injured. She retired during the midseason.

Kurys was an All-Star second baseman four years in a row, from 1946 through 1949, though the league only selected All-Star teams in five of her seasons as a regular. In 1946, she was also named Player of the Year. She holds the all-time records for stolen bases (1,114), runs scored (688), runs in a single game (five) and in a regular season (117). She also is third in lifetime hits (859) and walks (522). Following her AAGPBL career, she recovered from her injuries and played professional softball for four more years before she retired. Her mark of 201 stolen bases (in 203 attempts) was recognized in a 2013 exhibit by the Baseball Hall of Fame. Cincinnati Reds prospect Billy Hamilton set the minor league mark in 2012 with 155, while Rickey Henderson holds the modern major league record with 130.

Kurys was a longtime resident of Scottsdale, Arizona, where she died in 2013 at the age of 87, following complications from surgery.

== Career statistics ==
=== Batting ===
GP	AB	R	H	2B	3B	HR	RBI	SB	BB	SO	BA	OBP
914	3298	688	859	71	39	22	279	1,114	522	204	.260	.362

=== Fielding ===
PO	A	E	TC	DP	FA
2407	1641	190	4238	173	.957
