= Ann Harnett =

- Utility player
- Born: November 30, 1919; Chicago, Illinois, U.S.
- Died: September 10, 1974 (aged 54); Chicago, Illinois, U.S.
- Batted: Right Threw: Right

debut
- 1943

Last appearance
- 1947
- Stats at Baseball Reference

Teams
- Kenosha Comets (1943–1946); Peoria Redwings (1947)

Career highlights and awards
- All-Star Team (third base, 1943)

Ann Harnett (November 30, 1919 – September 10, 1974) was a female utility player who played from 1943 through 1946 in the All-American Girls Professional Baseball League (AAGPBL). Listed at 5' 6", 139 lb., Harnett batted and threw right-handed. She was born in Chicago, Illinois.

== Career ==
A Chicago baseball star and the first girl to sign a contract with the league, Harnett started her career at third base in 1943 with the Kenosha Comets, playing for them four years before joining the Peoria Redwings (1947). She started at third base during her first two seasons; in 1945 and 1946 played primarily as a catcher, and in 1947 moved to the outfield, though she pitched occasionally coming out of the bullpen. Her most productive season came in 1943, when she led the league in extra base hits (26), drove in 69 runs, and collected the best fielding average (.891) among defenders at third base, while hitting a solid .271 average. In the inaugural season, she also became the first third basewoman ever selected to an AAGPBL All-Star Team. But her average dropped off after the first season to .248 (1944), .202 (1945), .224 (1946) and .203 (1947). Following her baseball career, Harnett became a nun.

== Career statistics ==
Batting

GP	AB	R	H	2B	3B	HR	RBI	SB	TB	BB	SO	BA	OBP	SLG	OPS
314	1532	168	354	34	28	7	171	65	465	96	53	.231	.276	.304	.580

Fielding

GP	PO	A	E	TC	DP	FA
402	994	660	141	1795	23	.921
