= Johanna Hageman =

- First base / Chaperone
- Born: December 17, 1918; Chicago, Illinois, U.S.
- Died: February 10, 1984 (aged 65); Chicago, Illinois, U.S.
- Batted: Right Threw: Right

Teams
- South Bend Blue Sox (1943–1944); Kenosha Comets (1945/1946–1949)

Career highlights and awards
- Single season leader in fielding average (1943); Women in Baseball – AAGPBL Permanent Display at Baseball Hall of Fame and Museum (1988)

Johanna Hageman [Hargraves] (December 17, 1918 – February 10, 1984) was a first base player and chaperone in All-American Girls Professional Baseball League between the 1943 and 1949 seasons. Listed at 5 ft 9 in (1.75 m), 155 lb., she batted and threw right-handed.

Born in Chicago, Illinois, Johanna Hageman was one of the sixty original members of the All-American Girls Professional Baseball League. The circuit operated from 1943 through 1954 and started with four teams: the Racine Belles and the Kenosha Comets, both from Wisconsin; the Rockford Peaches from Illinois, and the South Bend Blue Sox from Indiana. League play officially began on May 30, 1943 and each team was made up of fifteen girls.

In the inaugural season, Hageman was the best fielder at first base while playing for the Blue Sox. She compiled a .983 average, after committing only 21 errors in 1,178 fielding chances. She also hit .225 with a .319 on-base percentage and a .295 slugging in 108 games, ending third in the league for the most doubles (10), sixth in runs batted in (45) and tenth in hits (85).

In 1944, Hageman batted just .142 in a career-high 116 games, but kept her good defense at first with a .982 mark. The next season she was traded to Kenosha and slumped to .117 in 96 games, even though she posted a .983 fielding average. She went on to play four more seasons with Kenosha from 1946 through 1949.

Hageman died in Chicago, Illinois at the age of 65. Four years after her death, she became part of Women in Baseball, a permanent display at the Baseball Hall of Fame and Museum at Cooperstown, New York, which was unveiled in 1988 to honor the entire All-American Girls Professional Baseball League.

== Career statistics ==
Batting

GP	AB	R	H	2B	3B	HR	RBI	SB	TB	BB	SO	BA	OBP	SLG
320	1011	79	169	14	8	1	82	58	202	128	87	.167	.261	.200

Fielding

GP	PO	A	E	TC	DP	FA
319	3220	94	59	3373	93	.983
