= Irene Ruhnke =

American baseball player

- Infield / Outfield
- Born: March 30, 1920; Chicago, Illinois, U.S.
- Died: July 13, 1999 (aged 79); Rockford, Illinois, U.S.
- Batted: Right Threw: Right

Teams
- Rockford Peaches (1943–1944, 1947); Minneapolis Millerettes (1944); Fort Wayne Daisies (1945–1946)

Career highlights and awards
- Postseason appearance (1945); Women in Baseball – AAGPBL Permanent Display at Baseball Hall of Fame and Museum (1988)

Irene Ruhnke (later Sanvitis; March 30, 1920 – July 13, 1999) was an infielder and outfielder who played from 1943 through 1947 in the All-American Girls Professional Baseball League (AAGPBL). Listed at 5 ft 4 in (1.63 m), 130 lb., she batted and threw right-handed. She was nicknamed "Ruhnke Dunk".

== Early life ==
Born in Chicago, Illinois, one of 13 siblings, Irene and her sister, Alice (later Mrs. Alice Cygan) started playing baseball when they attended St. Bridget's Catholic School in Bridgeport, Illinois. They competed against teams throughout the city. They kept playing when they attended Kelly High School.

== Career ==
Irene Ruhnke was one of the sixty original founding members of the All-American Girls Professional Baseball League (AAGPBL). Thanks to her defensive versatility and her ability to hit behind the runner, Ruhnke played several positions during her five years in the circuit. She started as a shortstop and outfielder for the Rockford Peaches in 1943, but later in her career she was platooned at second and third base. Her most productive season came in her rookie year, when she posted career numbers in average (.253), runs (54) and slugging (.316).

== Life after baseball ==
Following her baseball career, she spent the rest of her life in Rockford, Illinois, where she married and had two sons. She worked as a machine operator for 27 years at J. L. Clark Corp., from which she retired in 1985.

She died on July 13, 1999, aged 79, at the Swedish American Hospital in Rockford after a brief illness.

In 1988, Ruhnke became part of Women in Baseball, a permanent display based at the Baseball Hall of Fame and Museum in Cooperstown, New York, which was unveiled to honor the entire All-American Girls Professional Baseball League.

== Career statistics ==
Batting

| GP | AB | R | H | 2B | 3B | HR | RBI | SB | TB | BB | SO | BA | OBP | SLG |
|---|---|---|---|---|---|---|---|---|---|---|---|---|---|---|
| 385 | 1327 | 137 | 260 | 22 | 18 | 2 | 130 | 87 | 324 | 91 | 80 | .196 | .248 | .244 |

Fielding

| GP | PO | A | E | TC | DP | FA |
|---|---|---|---|---|---|---|
| 322 | 524 | 333 | 103 | 960 | 27 | ..893 |
