= Marge Villa =

American baseball player (1924–2023)

- Utility player
- Born: December 21, 1924; Montebello, California, U.S.
- Died: December 14, 2023 (aged 98)
- Batted: Right Threw: Right

Teams
- Kenosha Comets (1946–1950)

Career highlights and awards
- Set all-time records for the most runs batted in and total bases in a single game (1946)

Margaret Villa-Cryan (December 21, 1924 – December 14, 2023) was an American baseball player who played as an utility player from 1946 through 1950 in the All-American Girls Professional Baseball League (AAGPBL). Listed at 5 ft 2 in (1.57 m), 115 lb (52 kg), Villa batted and threw right-handed. She was born in Montebello, California and was of Mexican American descent.

A very versatile player, Marge Villa was one of the 39 players born in California to join the All-American Girls Professional Baseball League in its twelve years history. She entered the AAGPBL in 1946 with the Kenosha Comets, playing for them during her five years in the league, being used as a catcher, at second base and third base, as well as in the outfield corners, even though she claimed notoriety in a game during her rookie season.

On June 9, 1946, Villa made history in her own right, when she drove in nine runs and collected eleven total bases in a contest, setting two single-game league records that never would be surpassed.

In 1947, Villa had the chance to join the touring AAGPBL teams that traveled to Central and South America. After retirement, she focused much of her time and energy visiting friends and family and traveling to reunions of the AAGPBL Players Association.

From 1988 Villa was part of Women in Baseball, a permanent display based at the Baseball Hall of Fame and Museum in Cooperstown, New York, which was unveiled to honor the entire All-American Girls Professional Baseball League rather than individual baseball personalities. Besides this, she spent countless hours responding to requests for autographs and corresponding with young athletes interested in hearing of her days in the league.

As of 2016, it was noted that Villa-Cryan was still playing golf into her 90s and still spent time referring to fan mail. She died on December 14, 2023, at the age of 98.

== Career statistics ==
Batting

GP	AB	R	H	2B	3B	HR	RBI	SB	BB	SO	BA	OBP
537	1832	249	382	32	21	5	168	200	302	151	.209	.321

Fielding

GP	PO	A	E	TC	DP	FA
615	1407	800	131	2338	88	.944
