= Margaret Stefani =

- Infielder / Chaperone
- Born: December 18, 1917; Detroit, Michigan, U.S.
- Died: January 13, 1964 (aged 46)
- Batted: Right Threw: Right

Teams
- South Bend Blue Sox (1943–'47, 1949–'50); Rockford Peaches (1948)

Margaret Stefani [Marge] (December 18, 1917 – January 13, 1964) was an infielder and chaperone in the All-American Girls Professional Baseball League (AAGPBL).

== Summary ==
Born in Detroit, Michigan, Stefani was one of the sixty original players of the All-American Girls Professional Baseball League in its inaugural season. A versatile infielder who played mainly at second base, she gained respect amongst fellow players for being a tough competitor and a good hitter. She posted a lifetime average of .227, including 489 hits, 37 triples and eight home runs while scoring 317 runs. Though mainly a singles hitter, she was a productive force at the plate, driving in 216 runs, averaging over 43 per season and produced a personal-best 55 RBI in 1943.

Stefani entered the league in 1943 with the South Bend Blue Sox, playing for them five years before joining the Rockford Peaches (1948). She then found herself on the move again, this time as a chaperone with South Bend for two more years (1949–1950).

In her rookie year, Stefani posted career numbers in average (.249), hits (99), runs (87) and RBI (55). At the end of the season she was selected to the All-Star Team.

Stefani enjoyed another good season in 1946, hitting .224 with 70 runs and 53 RBI, and in 1947 she topped the Blue Sox regulars with a .237 average.

Stefani died on January 13, 1964, at the age of 46.

Marge Stefani is part of Women in Baseball, a permanent display based at the Baseball Hall of Fame and Museum in Cooperstown, New York. The exhibition was unveiled on November 5, 1988, to honor the entire All-American Girls Professional Baseball League rather than individual baseball personalities. After that, filmmaker Penny Marshall premiered her 1992 film A League of Their Own, a fictional history centered in the first season of the AAGPBL, which brought a rejuvenated interest to the historic girls league.

== Batting statistics ==
GP	AB	R	H	RBI	BA
642	2158	317	489	256	.227
