= Eleanor Dapkus =

American baseball player

- Center field / Pitcher
- Born: Eleanore Dapkus; December 5, 1923; Chicago, Illinois, U.S.
- Died: June 6, 2011 (aged 87); St. John, Indiana, U.S.
- Batted: Right Threw: Right

Career statistics
- Batting average: .229
- Home runs: 30
- Runs batted in: 317
- Win–loss record: 53–34
- Strikeouts: 397
- Earned run average: 1.97

Teams
- Racine Belles (1943–1950)

Career highlights and awards
- Two-time League and Playoff champion (1943, 1946); All-Star Team (1943); Single-season leader in home runs (10, 1943); Ranks 7th lifetime in home runs and 10th in RBI; Canadian Baseball Hall of Fame Induction (1998); Manitoba Baseball Hall of Fame Induction (1998)

Eleanor V. Wolf (née Eleanore Dapkus; December 5, 1923 – June 6, 2011) was a center fielder and pitcher who played from 1943 through 1950 in the All-American Girls Professional Baseball League (AAGPBL).

== Early years ==
Dapkus was born to Lithuanian parents, Frank and Antonina Dapkus, and raised in Chicago, Illinois. She was the tenth and youngest child in her family and the first girl after nine boys. She attended Christian Fenger Academy High School in Chicago and played every sport available to girls, but they were all of the playground variety, not varsity competition. Over the years, she earned twenty five medals in several sports, including softball, volleyball, basketball and soccer.

== AAGPBL career ==
In February 1943, Philip K. Wrigley founded the All-American Girls League. Wrigley, a chewing gum manufacturer and owner of the Chicago Cubs of Major League Baseball, materialized his idea as a promotional sideline to maintain interest in baseball as the World War II military draft was depleting Major League rosters of first-line players. Ann Harnett became the first girl to sign with the All-American, being followed by Claire Schillace, Edythe Perlick and Shirley Jameson. The first AAGPBL spring training was set for May 17, 1943, at Wrigley Field in Chicago. Since the only organized ball for women in the country was softball, the league created a hybrid game which included both softball and baseball. Wrigley had scouts all over the United States, Canada and even Cuba signing girls for tryouts. About 500 girls attended the call. Of these, only 280 were invited to the final try-outs in Chicago where 60 were chosen to become the first women to ever play professional baseball.

The league started with four teams, and each team was made up of fifteen girls. Dapkus survived the final cut and was assigned to the Racine Belles team, where she played for eight seasons. Dapkus earned the nickname Slugger for her power hitting abilities, helping Racine to clinch the league championship in both 1943 and 1946. She was chosen as the fourth outfielder for the 1943 All-Star team after leading the league with 10 home runs. The 1943 All-Star Game was the first night game played at Wrigley Field (July 1, 1943). In 1944, Dapkus paced the circuit with 10 doubles. For the 1946 team, she hit .253 and drove in 57 runs while tying for the league lead with nine triples. In 1948 the Belles decided to move her to the pitching mound, and she responded with a 24–9 mark as an overhand pitcher. But at the end of 1950 the Belles lacked the financial resources to keep the club playing in Racine, Wisconsin. Before the 1951 season, when the team moved to Battle Creek, Michigan, Dapkus, along with original Belles Maddy English, Edythe Perlick and Joanne Winter, were disappointed and decided not to make the move. During eight years, the Belles were a close-knit team, always like a family away from home. Dapkus and her teammates thought that all would be different, like a new team, maybe a new manager and, especially, a new location. Overall, Dapkus hit .229 with 30 home runs and 317 runs batted in 775 games, and posted a 53–34 record with 397 strikeouts and a 1.97 earned run average in 102 pitching appearances. She is seventh lifetime in home runs and ranks eleventh in runs batted in.

== Life after baseball ==
Both before and after she joined the AAGPBL, Dapkus worked in a variety of jobs. Most of her early work was clerical except for during World War II when she spraypainted airplane parts at the Pullman Aircraft factory. Following her playing retirement, she went back to Chicago. She married in 1950, changed her name to Eleanor Dapkus Wolf and had two sons, Frank and Richard. The All-American Girls Professional Baseball League folded in 1954, but there is now a permanent display at the Baseball Hall of Fame and Museum at Cooperstown, New York, since November 5, 1988 that honors those who were part of this unique experience. But like many of her AAGPBL colleagues, Dapkus was relatively unknown until the 1992 film A League of Their Own.

== Death ==
Eleanor Dapkus Wolf was a longtime resident of St. John, Indiana, where she died at the age of 87 from complications from breast cancer.

== Other sources ==
- Encyclopedia of Women and Baseball' – Leslie A. Heaphy, Mel Anthony May. Publisher: McFarland & Company, 2006. Format: Paperback, 438pp. Language: English. ISBN 0-7864-2100-2
- Women of the All-American Girls Professional Baseball League: A Biographical Dictionary - W. C. Madden. Publisher: McFarland & Company, 2005. Format: Paperback, 295 pp. Language: English. ISBN 0-7864-3747-2
