= Olive Little =

Canadian baseball player

Olive Bend Little [Ollie] (May 17, 1917 − February 2, 1987) was a Canadian baseball player, a pitcher in the All-American Girls Professional Baseball League between the 1943 and 1946 seasons. Listed at 5' 3", 135 lb., Little batted and threw right-handed. She was born in Poplar Point, Manitoba, Canada.

Little was renowned for her strong fastball and for pitching four no-hitter games. She threw the first no-hitter in All-American Girls Professional Baseball League history, for the Rockford Peaches on June 10, 1943.

As a founding member, Little entered the AAGPBL with the Rockford Peaches in 1943. She won 21 games and pitched the league's first no hitter on June 10 of that year in a nine inning game, even though she was tagged for two runs on that game. She also made the All Star team with 151 strikeouts to her credit. Little was out in 1944 to have a baby, but returned in 1945 to win 22 games. She went 14−17 in 1946, her last season.

In a three-season career, Little posted a 57−43 record with 381 strikeouts and a 2.23 ERA in 112 pitching appearances.

Little gained induction into the Manitoba Sports Hall of Fame and Museum in 1985. She died at the age of 69.

Since 1998, the Olive Little Memorial Award is presented to The Manitoba Softball Association's Top Senior Female Player.

== Sources ==
- All-American Girls Professional Baseball League Record Book – W. C. Madden. Publisher: McFarland & Company, 2000. Format: Paperback, 294pp. Language: English. ISBN 0-7864-3747-2. ISBN 978-0-7864-3747-4
- Women of the All-American Girls Professional Baseball League: A Biographical Dictionary - W. C. Madden. Publisher: McFarland & Company, 2005. Format: Paperback, 295 pp. Language: English. ISBN 0-7864-3747-2. ISBN 9780786422630*Biographical Dictionary of American Sports. Vol. 3: Baseball, Q-Z - David L. Porter. Publisher: Greenwood Pub Group, 1987. Language: English. ISBN 0-313-31176-5. ISBN 978-0-313-31176-5
- Olive Little Memorial Award
