= Betsy Jochum =

American baseball player (1921–2025)

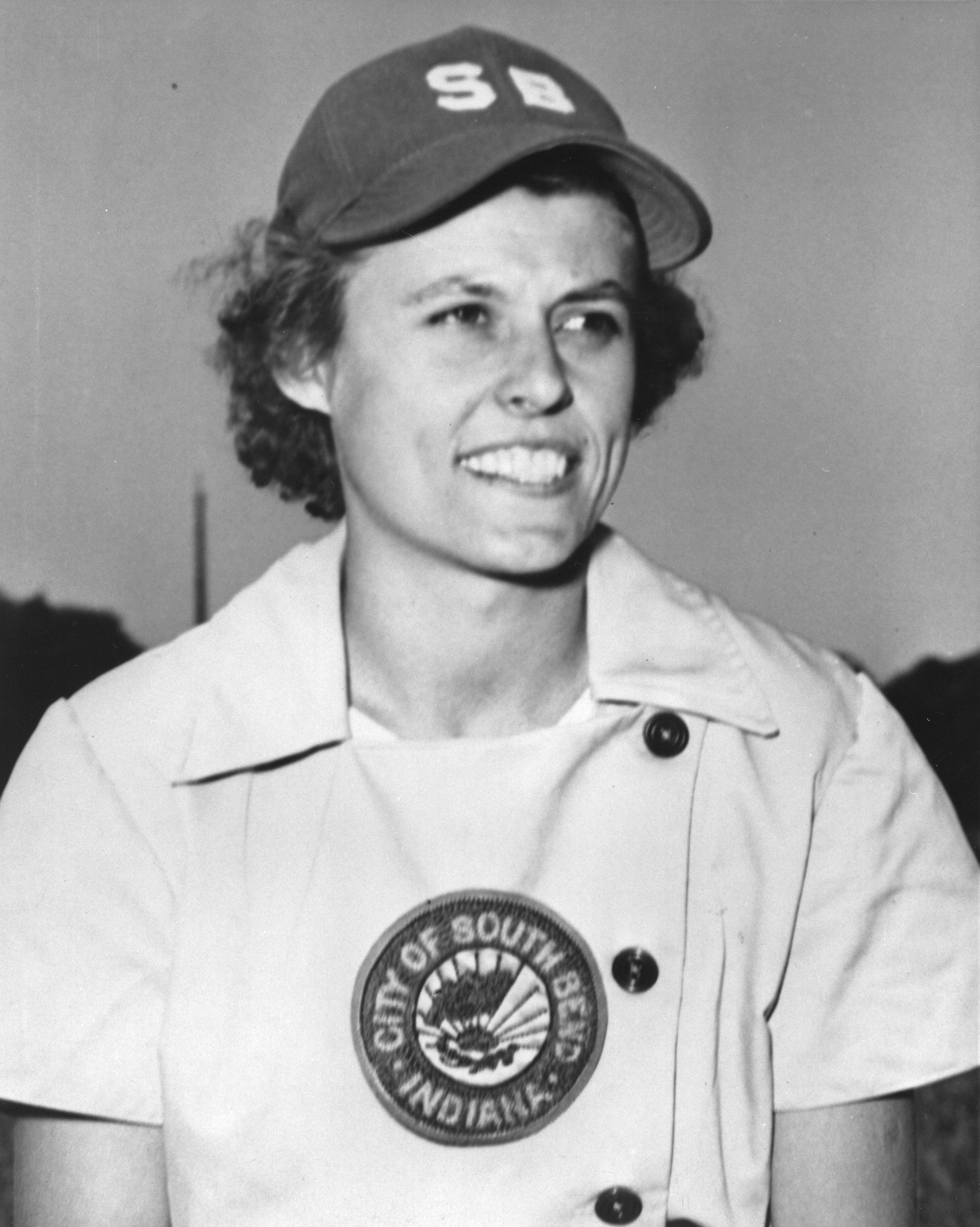
- Jochum in the 1946 South Bend Blue Sox Yearbook
- Outfielder, pitcher, first base
- Born: February 8, 1921; Cincinnati, Ohio, U.S.
- Died: May 31, 2025 (aged 104); South Bend, Indiana, U.S.
- Batted: Right Threw: Right
- Stats at Baseball Reference

Teams
- South Bend Blue Sox (1943–1948)

Career highlights and awards
- All-Star Game (1940); Three playoff appearances (1946-'48); Batting crown champion (1944); Single-season leader in: Hits and Doubles (1943) Hits and Singles (1944); Tied a league record for the most stolen bases in a single game (seven, on August 2, 1944); Ohio Baseball of Fame Induction (1999)

Betsy "Sockum" Jochum (February 8, 1921 – May 31, 2025) was an American outfielder and pitcher who played from 1943 through 1948 in the All-American Girls Professional Baseball League (AAGPBL). Listed at 5 ft 7 in (1.70 m), 140 lb (64 kg), she batted and threw right-handed.

== Overview profile ==
A native of Cincinnati, Jochum was one of the sixty original founding members of the All-American Girls Professional Baseball League. An ideal leadoff hitter, she was one of the fastest runners in the early years of the league and rarely struck out, fanning only 104 times in 2,401 plate appearances, which combined with a stellar defense and a strong and secure throwing arm. In addition, she was an All-Star, won a batting title, collected 354 stolen bases, and pitched a full season during her six seasons in the league.

== Background ==
Philip K. Wrigley decided, in 1942, to start a women's professional baseball league, concerned that the 1943 Major League Baseball season might be canceled because of World War II. Since the only organized ball for women in the country was softball, the league created a hybrid game which included both softball and baseball. Wrigley had scouts all over the United States, Canada and even Cuba signing women for tryouts. About 500 women attended the call. Of these, only 280 were invited to the final try-outs in Chicago, where 60 of them were chosen to become the first women to ever play professional baseball. The women were placed on the rosters of four fifteen-player teams: Kenosha Comets, Racine Belles, Rockford Peaches and South Bend Blue Sox. The first spring training was set for May 17, 1943, at Wrigley Field. Of the six women from Ohio who went to Chicago, Betsy Jochum and Dorothy Kamenshek were selected for the new league. Jochum was allocated to the Blue Sox and Kamenshek joined the Peaches.

== Early life ==
Betsy was the daughter of Frank and Katherine Jochum, German-speaking Hungarians who had immigrated to United States, landed at Ellis Island, and eventually arrived to Cincinnati, just before the United States joined World War I in 1917. Her father worked as a carpenter and cabinetmaker. She had an older brother, Nicholas, and her younger sister Frances. The siblings grew up together in a close household that held the value of family over anything else.

Jochum started playing sandlot ball by the time she turned eight and organized softball at age 12. During her student years at Hughes Center High School, she took part in many intramural athletic events offered for girls: basketball, volleyball, track and field and softball.

After graduating from high school, Jochum attended Cincinnati Business School and learned to operate the comptometer, the first commercially successful key-driven mechanical calculator. She was forced to take an employment in a meat packing house, and played semi-professional softball on the company team in the Cincinnati League. The team participated in several national softball tournaments, including at Chicago, Illinois. During a competition held in Connecticut in 1938, she posted a 276 feet mark which placed second only to Babe Zaharias, who threw the ball a national record of 296 feet. Later, she found a job in a dairy company doing comptometer work, earning $16 a week, before signing a contract for $50 per week.

== AAGPBL career ==
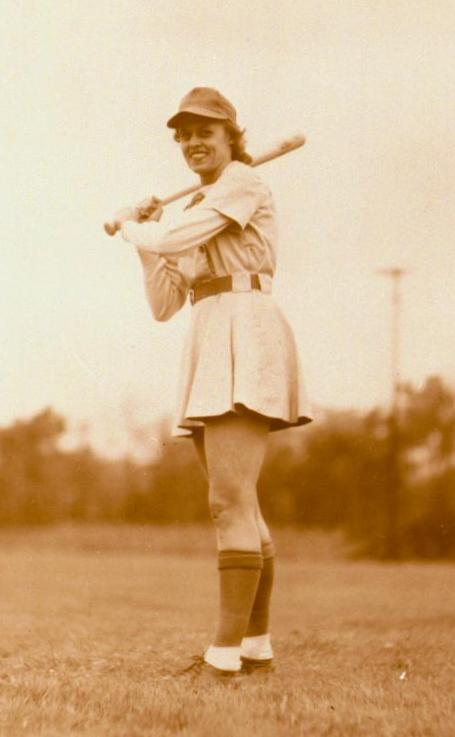
Betsy Jochum during the 1947 Season

Jochum entered the league in 1943 and spent her entire six-year career with the South Bend Blue Sox, one of two teams to play in every AAGPBL season, the other being the Rockford Peaches. Jochum appeared at center field and left, pitched, and also played first base for a long time when the regular was hurt. Her numbers were affected over time because she played in a league that progressively expanded the length of the base paths and pitching distance and decreased the size of the ball until the final year of play in the 1954 season.

In her rookie season, Jochum posted a .273 average and led the league in at-bats (439), hits (120), singles (100), and doubles (12). She also stole 66 bases, scored 70 runs, and led all hitters in the second half of the season with a .295 average. She was selected to the All-Star Game, which coincidentally was the first night game played at Wrigley Field, on July 1, 1943.

Jochum led the circuit in her sophomore year of 1944 by hitting a respectable .296 average, considering the league's dead-ball era. She also posted career-numbers in games (112), runs (72), hits (128) and stolen bases (127), including seven steals in a game on August 2.

Jochum dropped to .237 with 40 runs and 25 stolen bases in 1945 but rebounded in 1946 with a .250 average, including 64 runs, 73 stolen bases, 64 runs and a career-high 63 runs batted in. In that season, Dorothy Kamenshek led the league with a .316 average, while Bonnie Baker tied Sophie Kurys for second place at .286. With her .250 average, Jochum ranked third in her team and tenth overall for girls playing 90 or more games. She also tied with Kamenshek for the fewest strikeouts (10) and ranked second in RBI behind Elizabeth Mahon (72). Often a second-division team, the Blue Sox advanced to the playoffs for the first time in 1946, being beat in the first round by the Racine Belles, the eventual Championship Team after defeating the Rockford Peaches in six games.

In 1947, the league moved its spring training camp to Havana, Cuba. The new rules applied during the regular season permitted a full sidearm pitching delivery, and many players who developed hitting underhand pitching had problems adjusting to the new pitching style. As a result of the innovation, Dorothy Kamenshek was the champion bat with a significant .306 average, Audrey Wagner was the leader with seven home runs, and Elizabeth Mahon topped all hitters with 53 runs batted in. Jochum was not an exception, as she slipped to .211, 42 RBI, 36 runs, and 44 stolen bases. For the second consecutive year South Bend made the playoffs, but again lost in the first round, this time to the Grand Rapids Chicks, who defeated the Racine Belles in seven games.

In 1948, the league shifted to overhand pitching. Showing her versatility, the strong-armed Jochum was a natural choice to become a pitcher in her final season. She debuted against the Fort Wayne Daisies and limited them to a pair of hits, allowing only four batters to get on base (two by errors) while striking out five. At one point during the season, Jochum had a 13–6 record, but she lost seven of her last eight decisions to finish with a 14–13 mark. When she was not pitching, South Bend manager Marty McManus used her to fill at outfield, first base and pinch hit, even though she batted a low-career .195 average. Nevertheless, Jochum provided 14 of the 57 victories of her team, including a sparkling 1.51 earned run average, and striking out 103 batters while walking just 58 in 215 innings of work. Nevertheless, for the second straight year South Bend lost to Grand Rapids in the first round of the playoffs.

== Statistics ==
=== Batting ===
GP	AB	R	H	2B	3B	HR	RBI	SB	BB	SO	BA	OBP
645	2401	307	591	43	29	7	232	358	177	104	.246	.301

=== Fielding ===
PO	A	E	DP	TC	FA
888	76	48	13	1012	.953

=== Pitching ===
W	L	W-L%	ERA	GP	IP	R	ER	BB	SO	SO/BB
14	13	.519	1.51	29	215.0	61	36	58	103	1.78

== Life after baseball ==
Jochum quit the league after the 1948 season, when she was notified that the Peoria Redwings had acquired her in a transaction with the Blue Sox. After her baseball days, Jochum earned a bachelor's degree in physical education from Illinois State University in 1957 and a master's degree in physical education from Indiana University in 1961. She taught girls physical education for South Bend Community Schools at Muessel Elementary/Junior High School for 26 years and retired in 1983. After that, she participated in golf, bowling, and the Run Jane Run Exhibition Games. She also assisted in gathering and sorting AAGPBL memorabilia for the Northern Indiana Historical Society.

In November 1988, Jochum, along with her former teammates and opponents, received their long overdue recognition, when the Baseball Hall of Fame and Museum in Cooperstown, New York dedicated a permanent display to the All American Girls Professional Baseball League. In 1999 she was enshrined into the Ohio Baseball of Fame and Museum in 1999. Besides this, her South Bend Blue Sox uniform has traveled in an itinerant display promoted by the Smithsonian Institution as part of its exhibition on Sports: Breaking Records, Breaking Barriers. As Jochum recalled in an interview, Women should have their own major league and minor leagues plus the sponsors to make it go. As of 2010, Jochum was living in South Bend, Indiana. She turned 100 in February 2021.

Jochum died in South Bend on May 31, 2025, at the age of 104.
