= Joanne Winter =

American baseball player (1924–1996)

- Pitcher
- Born: November 24, 1924; Chicago, Illinois, U.S.
- Died: September 22, 1996 (aged 71); Scottsdale, Arizona, U.S.
- Batted: Right Threw: Right

Teams
- Racine Belles (1943–1950)

Career highlights and awards
- 3× All-Star Team (1946–1948); 2× AAGPBL champion (1943, 1946); All-time leader in innings (2159) and pitching appearances (287); Season-record in wins (33; 1946)

Joanne Emily Winter (November 24, 1924 – September 22, 1996) was an American pitcher who played from 1943 through 1950 in the All-American Girls Professional Baseball League (AAGPBL). Listed at 5 ft 8 in (1.73 m), 138 lb., she batted and threw right-handed.

== Early life ==
A native of Chicago, Illinois, Joanne Winter was the daughter of George Winter and Edith (née Watson) Winter, of German and Scottish origins, respectively. The young Winter attended Proviso Township High School in Maywood, Illinois. Athletically inclined, she participated in basketball, soccer, swimming, volleyball, track and field, tennis, and handball as a youth in Maywood, a western suburb of Chicago. At age 11, she joined the Oak Park Coeds softball team. In addition, she spent much of her free time training in a gymnasium owned by Jocko Conlan, a local hero and an umpire with Major League Baseball experience.

Winter dropped out of Proviso Township High School at 15 to play softball for the Parichy Roofing Company, well known as a Bloomer Girls team, and later joined the Admiral Music Maids of the National Women's Softball League. She later moved with her family to Phoenix, Arizona, where she played for the Arizona Ramblers. At 18, she heard about Philip K. Wrigley and his remarkable experiment in creating a women's professional baseball league.

== Birth of the AAGPBL ==
During World War II, Wrigley was in charge both of the Wrigley Company and the Chicago Cubs Major League Baseball club. Wrigley decided to found the All-American Girls Professional Baseball League as a promotional sideline to maintain interest in baseball as the military draft was depleting Major League rosters of first-line players. Wrigley approached other Major League team owners, but the idea was not well received. Then, four non-Major League cities were selected that were in close proximity to the AAGPBL headquarters in Chicago and close to each other: Rockford of Illinois, South Bend of Indiana, and Racine and Kenosha of Wisconsin. After four years of semiprofessional competition, Winter tried out for the AAGPBL.

Since the only organized ball for women in the country was softball, the league created a hybrid game which included both softball and baseball. Wrigley had scouts all over the United States, Canada and even Cuba signing girls for tryouts. About 500 girls attended the call. Of these, only 280 were invited to the final try-outs in Chicago where 60 were chosen to become the first women to ever play professional baseball. The league started with the four teams aforementioned, and each team was made up of fifteen girls. Winter survived the final cut and was assigned to the Racine Belles, where she played for the next eight seasons.

== AAGPBL career ==
Winter posted an 11–11 record in 1943, helping the Belles win both the first half of the season and AAGPBL championship. In the best-of-five Series, Racine defeated the Kenosha Comets, winners of the second half, 3 games to 0. She also was selected for the All-Star Game, which was the first night game played at Wrigley Field (July 1, 1943).

But each year the field dimension changed as the league came closer to emulating the game played by the men's major leagues. The pitching mound was raised, the pitching distance was lengthened, the ball shrank from season to season, the basepaths were extended and two new teams were added, until sidearm pitching was allowed in 1946. Winter had a hard time dealing with the changes as she struggled to keep mentally focused, recording a 22–45 mark between 1944 and 1945. Then she learned from a Mexican hurler how to pitch a sidearm sling-shot delivery. The rising pitch baffled hitters and transformed her in one of the best pitchers of the league, most notably, when the league expanded from six to eight teams.

In 1946, Winter earned 33 victories for only nine losses while pitching 17 shutouts with 183 strikeouts in 46 pitching appearances. Winter's 33 wins tied her with Connie Wisniewski for most victories in a regular season. She also set all-time records of 63 consecutive scoreless innings and six consecutive shutouts; was selected an All-Star, and led Racine capture another pennant and championship. The Belles finished in first place with a league-best 74–38 record, won the semifinal round of playoffs by defeating the South Bend Blue Sox in four games, and clinched the title after beating the 1945 AAGPBL champions Rockford Peaches, four games to two.

Throughout the playoffs Sophie Kurys was the biggest Belles star. She led all players in average, stolen bases, and runs scored. On the other hand, Winter collected four wins in all series, including three against Rockford, despite allowing 19 base runners in a 1–0 shutout victory over the Peaches in decisive Game Six. The winning run was scored by Kurys on an RBI-single by Betty Trezza. The Belles also showed a great defense, notably by left fielder Edythe Perlick, right fielder Eleanor Dapkus, first sacker Margaret Danhauser, shortstop Trezza, and Maddy English at third.

Winter went 22–13 with 121 strikeouts in 1947, leading her team again to the playoffs. Racine defeated the Muskegon Lassies, three games to one, but lost to the Grand Rapids Chicks in the final Series four games to three.

Winter was able to make the adjustment to overhand pitching before the 1948 season, when Leo Murphy, former Pittsburgh Pirates catcher and Belles manager, helped her convert to a three-quarters delivery during spring training. She responded by leading the league with 256 strikeouts and 329 innings while tying in victories (25) with Alice Haylett, joining the All-Star team for a third time and helping Racine garner another pennant. The Belles lost the semifinal playoff to the Peaches, the eventually winners of the Championship Title.

A durable and consistent pitcher, Winter fell victim to the new rules. She had a shoulder that could not take the new pitching motion and also developed back problems, compiling a 20–25 record in her last two seasons. At the end of 1950 the Belles lacked the financial resources to keep the club playing in Racine and opted to move to Battle Creek, Michigan for the 1951 season. Winter, along with original Belles Dapkus, English, Kurys and Perlick, were disappointment and decided not to make the move. During eight years, the Belles were a close-knit team, always like a family away from home. Winter and teammates thought that all would be different, like a new team, maybe a new manager and, specially, a new location. Winter moved back to Arizona in the late 1960s and Sophie Kurys lived across the street from her home in Scottsdale, Arizona, until after Winter's death in 1996.

== Pitching statistics ==
GP	W	L	W-L%	ERA	IP	H	R	ER	BB	SO	WHIP
287	133	115	.536	2.06	2159	1470	822	495	759	770	1.0324

== Other leagues ==
After that, Winter and several other primarily underhand pitchers rejoined the Admirals of the National Girls Baseball League for a higher salary. The team paid Winter $150 a week and gave her a $400 bonus for winning 25 games. She competed four more years in the league and returned to Phoenix, Arizona in 1955 to pitch for the Phoenix A-1 Queens. In 1958, she posted 36–6 record and led her team to the State Women's championship.

== Golf career ==
Winter, an accomplished athlete, taught and played tennis and golf in Arizona. Her ability to compete in two professional sports marked a rarity for women in the 1960s. She won the Arizona State Women's Golf championship four times, and joined the Ladies Professional Golf Association in 1962, competing in 25 tournaments. Her LPGA career ended in 1965 due to a back injury caused by an auto accident.

== Honors and awards ==
In November 1988, Winter, along with her former baseball teammates and opponents, received their long overdue recognition, when the Baseball Hall of Fame and Museum in Cooperstown, New York dedicated a permanent display to the All American Girls Professional Baseball league. But like many of her AAGPBL colleagues, Winter was relatively unknown until the 1992 film A League of Their Own by filmmaker Penny Marshall was exhibited for the first time. During the pre-production phase she joined several former AAGPBL players as consultants for the film.

== Death ==
Winter died in Scottsdale, Arizona at the age of 71.
