= Shirley Jameson =

- Center fielder
- Born: March 29, 1918; Maywood, Illinois, U.S.
- Died: December 29, 1993 (aged 75)
- Batted: Right Threw: Left

Teams
- Kenosha Comets (1943–1946)

Career highlights and awards
- All-Star Team (1943); Single-season leader in stolen bases (126, 1943); Twice stole seven bases in a single game (July 2 and 24 of 1944)

Shirley Jameson (March 29, 1918 – December 29, 1993) was an American center fielder who played from 1943 through 1946 in the All-American Girls Professional Baseball League (AAGPBL). Listed at 4 ft 10 3/4 in (1.492 m), 104 pounds (47 kg), Jameson batted right-handed and threw left-handed. She was born in Maywood, Illinois.

== Sources ==
- "Morrison Teacher's Picture in Magazine," Dispatch, August 21, 1942.
- Encyclopedia of Women and Baseball – Leslie A. Heaphy, Laura Wulf, Mel Anthony May. Publisher: McFarland & Company, 2006. Format: Hardcover, 438pp. Language: English. ISBN 0-7864-2100-2
- Girls of Summer: The Real Story of the All American Girls Professional Baseball League – Lois Browne. Publisher: HarperCollins, 1992. Format: Hardcover, 212 pp. Language: English. ISBN 0-00-215838-8
- Women in Baseball: The Forgotten History – Gai Ingham Berlage, Charley Gerard. Publisher: Greenwood Publishing Group, 1994. Format: Hardcover, 224pp. Language: English. ISBN 978-0-275-94735-4
