= Edythe Perlick =

- Left fielder
- Born: December 12, 1922; Chicago, Illinois, U.S.
- Died: February 27, 2003 (aged 80); Pompano Beach, Florida, U.S.
- Batted: Right Threw: Right

Career statistics
- Batting average: .230
- Home runs: 18
- Runs batted in: 392
- Stolen bases: 481

Teams
- Racine Belles (1943–1950)

Career highlights and awards
- Two-time AAGPBL Championship Team (1943, 1946); Three-time All-Star Team (1943, 1947-1948); Season lead in RBI (1944, 1945)

Edythe Perlick (December 12, 1922 – February 27, 2003), known by her nickname Edie, was a left fielder who played from 1943 through 1950 in the All-American Girls Professional Baseball League (AAGPBL). Listed at 5 ft 3 in (1.60 m), 128 lb., she batted and threw right-handed.

Perlick has been listed as one of the Top 20 AAGPBL Players of All Time, according to baseball researcher Sharon L. Roepke. A three-time All-Star, Perlick is often described as a multifaceted five-tool player. She was able to hit for average and power, was a smart and speedy baserunner, and combined fielding abilities with a strong and accurate throwing arm.

== Early life ==
A native of Chicago, Illinois, Perlick grew up in a German family in northwestern Chicago. Her father worked as an accountant. She had one sister, Jean, and a brother, Allan. At age 12, Perlick played volleyball and fast-pitch softball in the Chicago city leagues. She later competed in softball tournaments after graduating from high school and attended teachers' college for one year.

== AAGPBL career ==
Perlick was one of the original 60 players in the league, and her team, the Racine Belles, won the first AAGPBL Championship Title in 1943, defeating the Kenosha Comets three games to none. She also became the first left fielder to be included in the All-Star Team, a distinction that she repeated in 1947 and 1948.

In an eight-season career, Perlick was a .240 hitter in a pitching-dominated league. In her rookie season, she batted a career-best .268, which was the league's 12th highest average among regular players. She collected 481 stolen bases in her career, but perhaps her best quality was her timely hitting in clutch situations. Usually, she led the Belles in runs batted in, driving in a career-high 63 runs in 1944 to set a Racine season-record, leading the Belles again in 1945 (41), 1948 (51), 1949 (41) and 1950 (59). She averaged 49 RBI in each of her eight seasons, and her 392 career RBI ranks her sixth in the All-Time list.

In 1946, Perlick hit .230 with a career-high 88 stolen bases and belted four home runs as cleanup hitter, helping the Belles to clinch their second Championship Title.

But at the end of 1950 the Belles lacked the financial resources to keep the club playing in Racine, Wisconsin. Before the 1951 season, when the team moved to Battle Creek, Michigan, Perlick, along with original Belles Eleanor Dapkus, Maddy English, Sophie Kurys and Joanne Winter, were disappointed and decided not to make the move. During eight years, the Belles were a close-knit team, always like a family away from home. Perlick and teammates thought that all would be different, like a new team, maybe a new manager and, especially, a new location. Perlick returned to Chicago and played fast-pitch softball for two years with the Admiral Music Maids of the National Girls Baseball League.

== Milestone ==
In 1980, former AAGPBL player June Peppas motivated a group of friends and began assembling a list of names and addresses of her former pals. Her initiative turned into a newsletter and resulted in the league's first-ever reunion in Chicago, Illinois in 1982. Stemming from that reunion, a Players Association was formed in 1987 and many former AAGPBL players continued to enjoy reunions, which became annual events in 1998. In November 1988, Perlick, along with her former teammates and opponents, received their long overdue recognition, when the Baseball Hall of Fame and Museum in Cooperstown, New York dedicated a permanent display to the All American Girls Professional Baseball league. The association was largely responsible for the opening of the exhibition.

== Private life ==
After being married in 1952, she also played under the name Edie Keating or Edie Perlick Keating. At age 30, she left the game, raised her daughter, Susan, and worked in Chicago for manufacturing firms A.B. Dick Company and Teletype Corporation. She had two grandsons, Danny and Jeff. After moving to Fort Lauderdale, Florida, she worked another 25 years for Harris Corporation, a computer systems company. She retired in 1993 and moved to Pompano Beach, Florida, where she died at the age of 80.
