= Maddy English =

American baseball player

- Third base
- Born: February 22, 1925; Everett, Massachusetts, U.S.
- Died: August 21, 2004 (aged 79); Everett, Massachusetts, U.S.
- Batted: Right Threw: Right

debut
- 1943

Last appearance
- 1951

Career statistics
- Runs: 357
- Hits: 516
- Runs batted in: 209
- Stolen bases: 439

Teams
- Racine Belles

Career highlights and awards
- Two-time AAGPBL Championship Title (1943, 1946); Three-time All-Star Team (1946, 1948-'49)

Madeline Katherine English (February 22, 1925 – August 21, 2004) was an American third basewoman who played from 1943 through 1951 in the All-American Girls Professional Baseball League (AAGPBL). Listed at 5 ft 4 in (1.63 m), 130 lb., English batted and threw right-handed. At age eighteen, she became one of the youngest founding members of the league.

English played all nine of her AAGPBL seasons with the Racine Belles. She anchored third base for the Belles and usually batted second in the batting order. A three-time All-Star, she helped the Belles win three pennants and two championships in the AAGPBL, by combining a sharp defense, opportune hitting, and a flashy base running. A natural teacher who cared most about being on a baseball diamond, she excelled as an educator, teaching a variety of subjects for over 30 years after retiring from baseball.

== Early life ==
A native of Everett, Massachusetts, English was the daughter of Ambrose Tobias English, a pipe-fitter and longtime Everett city official, and Anna (née Henneberry) English. Her older brother, Edward, was a high school star third baseman who saw his professional baseball dreams truncated by military service during wartime. She attended parochial grammar schools and graduated from Everett High School, and was a competent athlete in any sport she could find to play. Although there were no organized girls interscholastic sports, English began participating in pickup softball games at age ten on Boston area playgrounds. In 1939 she joined a Massachusetts 14-year-old softball team, which competed against opponents from Connecticut and New York in summer exhibitions. Like her brother, she played at third base and had a strong throwing arm. English and her Bay State teammates were coached by some players of the Boston Bruins hockey team, and they played their home games on the concrete floor of the Boston Garden when the Bruins and the Boston Celtics basketball team were out of the town.

In 1943, a baseball scout impressed after seeing English play in the 1939 summer exhibitions, invited her to a tryout at Wrigley Field in Chicago, Illinois. English was assigned to the Racine Belles of Wisconsin, one of four original AAGPBL teams.

== AAGPBL career ==
English enjoyed many firsts in her illustrious baseball career. She was one of the original 60 players in the league, and her team, the Belles, won the first AAGPBL Championship Title in 1943, defeating the Kenosha Comets three games to none. From 1943 to 1945, the league had not yet developed an All-Star contest. Was in 1946, for the first time, when the team's managers voted to select the best players to join the All-Star Team. English became the first AAGPBL third base player to be named an All-Star, a distinction that she repeated in 1948 and 1949. Her most productive season came in 1948, when she posted career-highs in batting average (.231), hits (95), doubles (16), triples (eight) and home runs (five).

English tied a league record by stealing seven bases in a 1947 single game, but she also responded in pressure situations. In 1946, the Racine Belles won the championship in the preliminary best-of-five series over the South Bend Blue Sox, three games to one. In Game 1, English drove in the winning run by hitting a double in the bottom half of the 14th inning. Then, in decisive Game 5 she knocked the winning run with a single in the bottom half of the 17th inning. In this first round series she went 11-for-31 for a .353 average, including her two game-winning RBI. After that, the Belles beat the Rockford Peaches four games to one in the final best-of-seven series to clinch the Championship Title. During the off-season, English attended Boston University evenings and Saturdays to attain her degree. But combining baseball with going to college nights took her nine years to graduate. Nevertheless, playing professional baseball did help to pay her college expenses. Before the 1951 season, when the team moved from Racine, Wisconsin to Battle Creek, Michigan, English and some original Belles members were disappointment and decided not to make the move. During eight years, the Belles were a close-knit team, always like a family away from home. English and teammates thought that all would be different, like a new team, maybe a new manager and, specially, a new location.

English was a light average hitter in the pitching-dominated AAGPBL, but her play for Racine was outstanding. She hit .171, scored 357 runs, stole 439 bases and belted 13 home runs, while driving in 209 runs. 79 of her 516 hits were for extrabases. At third base, she posted a .896 fielding average, including 1,439 putouts, 2,255 assists, and 106 double plays.

== Milestones ==
English waited the required two years to regain her amateur status. After that, she served as player-manager of an all-star softball team in Lynn, Massachusetts for five years. English earned her B.S. degree in education in 1957 and a master's degree in 1962. She worked as a recreation leader in Everett and had a 27-year career at Parlin Junior High School, spending 10 years as a classroom and physical education teacher, and 17 years as the school's guidance counselor. She retired in 1984.

In 1980, former AAGPBL player June Peppas motivated a group of friends and began assembling a list of names and addresses of her former pals. Her initiative turned into a newsletter and resulted in the league's first-ever reunion in Chicago, Illinois in 1982. Stemming from that reunion, a Players Association was formed in 1987 and many former AAGPBL players continued to enjoy reunions, which became annual events in 1998. Regularly, English attended the reunions of the association and collaborated on many aspects of its purposes.

In November 1988, the Baseball Hall of Fame and Museum in Cooperstown, New York dedicated a permanent display to the All American Girls Professional Baseball League. The association was largely responsible for the opening of the exhibition. English also has been inducted into the Boston University Athletics Hall of Fame, the Women in Sports Hall of Fame, and the Sports Museum of New England.

== A League of Their Own ==
In 1992, filmmaker Penny Marshall premiered her film A League of Their Own, which was a fictionalized account of activities in the AAGPBL. Starring Geena Davis, Tom Hanks, Madonna, Lori Petty and Rosie O'Donnell, this film brought a rejuvenated interest to the women's baseball. While the film does not use real names, Marshall seemed to be aiming for realism, as her film includes fake newsreel footage and pseudo-documentary present day scenes at the beginning and end of the story. A League of Their Own itself was inspired by the 1987 documentary of the same title, written and produced by Kelly Candaele, one of the five sons of Helen Callaghan, who in 1945 won the AAGPBL batting championship with a .299 average. English, like many of her colleagues, was relatively unknown until the film was exhibited for the first time.

A few months later, Maddy English died in her home town of Everett at the age of 79, following complications from cancer. The city of Everett, MA honored Maddy English by naming one of their K-8 elementary schools after her.
