= List of All-American Girls Professional Baseball League players (H–L) =

The following is a list of All-American Girls Professional Baseball League players who formed part of the circuit during its twelve years of existence.

== See also ==
- List of All-American Girls Professional Baseball League players (A–C)
- List of All-American Girls Professional Baseball League players (D–G)
- List of All-American Girls Professional Baseball League players (M–R)
- List of All-American Girls Professional Baseball League players (S–Z)

== H ==
Name	Position(s)	Year(s)	Team(s)	Ref
Carol Habben	outfield	1951–1954	Rockford Peaches, Kalamazoo Lassies	
Miss Hack	n/a	1946	Muskegon Lassies	
Violet Hackbarth	n/a	1946	n/a	
Johanna Hageman	first base	1943–1949	South Bend Blue Sox, Kenosha Comets	
Audrey Haine	pitcher	1944–1948; 1951	Minneapolis Millerettes, Fort Wayne Daisies, Grand Rapids Chicks, Peoria Redwings, Rockford Peaches	
Martha Haines	second base	1947	Kenosha Comets	
Marlene Hammond	n/a	1954	Kalamazoo Lassies	
Marjorie Hanna	pitcher	1944	Kenosha Comets	
Julia Hardin	n/a	1946	Grand Rapids Chicks	
Ann Harnett	third base, catcher	outfield	Kenosha Comets, Peoria Redwings	
Elise Harney	pitcher	1943–1947	Kenosha Comets, Fort Wayne Daisies	
Dorothy Harrell [1]	shortstop	1944–1950, 1952	Rockford Peaches	
Doris Harrington	n/a	1952	n/a	
Josephine Hasham	pitcher	1948–1954	Muskegon Lassies, Peoria Redwings, South Bend Blue Sox, Battle Creek Belles, Muskegon Belles, Rockford Peaches, Grand Rapids Chicks	
Beverly Hatzell	pitcher	1949–1951	Chicago Colleens, Racine Belles, Peoria Redwings, Battle Creek Belles	
Jean Havlish	shortstop	1951–1954	Fort Wayne Daisies	
Florence Hay	outfield	1949	Chicago Colleens	
Alice Haylett	pitcher, outfield	1946–1949	Grand Rapids Chicks	
Martha Hayslip	infield	1948	South Bend Blue Sox	
Irene Headin	pitcher	1945	South Bend Blue Sox	
Ruby Heafner	catcher	1946–1951	Rockford Peaches, Fort Wayne Daisies, Racine Belles, Battle Creek Belles	
Kay Heim	catcher	1943–1944	Kenosha Comets	
Katherine Herring	outfield	1953	Grand Rapids Chicks	
Esther Ann Hershey	outfield	1948	Springfield Sallies	
Lillian Hickey	outfield	1946–1947	Kenosha Comets	
Irene Hickson	catcher	1943–1951	Racine Belles, Kenosha Comets	
Joyce Hill [2]	catcher, first base, outfield	1945–1952	Grand Rapids Chicks, Fort Wayne Daisies, South Bend Blue Sox, Peoria Redwings, Racine Belles	
Barbara Hines	n/a	1951	Peoria Redwings	
Lillian Hlavaty	outfield	1951	Rockford Peaches	
Nadine Hoffman	n/a	1946	Peoria Redwings	
Barbara Hoffman	second base, third base	1951–1952	South Bend Blue Sox	
Alice Hohlmayer	first base, pitcher	1946–1951	Kenosha Comets, Muskegon Lassies, Kalamazoo Lassies, Peoria Redwings	
Mary Holda	third base, shortstop	1943	South Bend Blue Sox	
Beverly Holden	n/a	1951	Kenosha Comets	
Joan Holderness	outfield, shortstop	1949–1951	Kenosha Comets, Grand Rapids Chicks, Battle Creek Belles	
Margaret Holgerson [3]	second base, pitcher	1946–1952	Rockford Peaches, Muskegon Lassies, Grand Rapids Chicks	
Mabel Holle	third base, outfield	1943–1944	Kenosha Comets, South Bend Blue Sox	
Marjorie Hood	outfield utility	1943	Rockford Peaches, South Bend Blue Sox	
Alice Hoover	second base, third base	1948	Fort Wayne Daisies	
Catherine Horstman	third base, pitcher, catcher	1951–1954	Kenosha Comets, Fort Wayne Daisies	
Marion Hosbein	outfield utility	1954	South Bend Blue Sox	
Dorothy Hunter	first base	1943–1954	Grand Rapids Chicks, Racine Belles, Kenosha Comets	
Anna Mae Hutchison	pitcher, catcher	1946–1949	Racine Belles, Muskegon Lassies	

1 Harrell also played under her married name of Dorothy Doyle.
2 Hill also played under her married name of Joyce Westerman.
3 Holgerson also played under her married name of Margaret Silvestri.

== J ==
Name	Position(s)	Year(s)	Team(s)	Ref
Lillian Jackson	outfield	1943–1945	Rockford Peaches, Minneapolis Millerettes, Fort Wayne Daisies	
Jane Jacobs	pitcher	1944–1947	Racine Belles, Peoria Redwings	
Janet Jacobs	shortstop, center field	1945	Racine Belles	
Shirley Jameson	outfield	1943–1946	Kenosha Comets	
Janet Jamieson	outfield	1948	South Bend Blue Sox	
Alice Janowski	n/a	1951	Fort Wayne Daisies	
Loretta Janowski	catcher	1951	South Bend Blue Sox	
Frances Janssen	pitcher	1948–1952	Grand Rapids Chicks, Chicago Colleens, Springfield Sallies, Fort Wayne Daisies, Peoria Redwings, Kalamazoo Lassies, Battle Creek Belles	
Joan Jaykoski	outfield, pitcher	1951–1952	Kenosha Comets, Grand Rapids Chicks	
Marilyn Jenkins	catcher	1952–1954	Grand Rapids Chicks	
Christine Jewitt	outfield	1948–1949	Kenosha Comets, Peoria Redwings	
Betsy Jochum	center field, right field, pitcher	1943–1948	South Bend Blue Sox	
Donna Jogerst	pitcher	1952	Rockford Peaches	
Arleene Johnson	third base, shortstop	1945–1948	Fort Wayne Daisies, Muskegon Lassies	
Esther Johnson	pitcher	1946	n/a	
Doris Jones	infielder, outfielder	1945	South Bend Blue Sox	
Marguerite Jones	pitcher	1944	Minneapolis Millerettes, Rockford Peaches	
Marilyn Jones	pitcher, catcher	1948–1954	Kenosha Comets, Fort Wayne Daisies, Chicago Colleens, Rockford Peaches, Battle Creek Belles, Muskegon Lassies	
Daisy Junor	outfield	1946–1949	South Bend Blue Sox, Springfield Sallies, Fort Wayne Daisies	
Margaret Jurgensmeier	pitcher	1951	Rockford Peaches	

== K ==
Name	Position(s)	Year(s)	Team(s)	Ref
Josephine Kabick	pitcher	1944–1947	Milwaukee Chicks, Grand Rapids Chicks, Kenosha Comets, Peoria Redwings	
Dorothy Kamenshek	first base	1943–1951, 1953	Rockford Peaches	
Joan Kaufman	second base, third base	1954	Rockford Peaches	
Marie Kazmierczak	outfield	1944	Kenosha Comets, Racine Belles, Milwaukee Chicks	
Merle Keagle	outfield, third base, pitcher	1944, 1946, 1948	Milwaukee Chicks, Grand Rapids Chicks	
Rita Keller	shortstop	1951	Kalamazoo Lassies	
Jacquelyn Kelley	catcher, pitcher, outfield/infield utility	1947–1953	South Bend Blue Sox, Chicago Colleens, Peoria Redwings, Rockford Peaches	
Vivian Kellogg	first base	1944–1950	Minneapolis Millerettes, Fort Wayne Daisies	
Beatrice Kemmerer	catcher, shortstop	1950–1951	Fort Wayne Daisies, South Bend Blue Sox	
Lavina Keough	pitcher	1945–1946	South Bend Blue Sox	
Evelyn Keppel	catcher	1945	South Bend Blue Sox	
Adeline Kerrar	short stop, catcher, third base	1944	Rockford Peaches	
Marguerite Kerrigan	pitcher, infield/outfield utility	1950–1951	Rockford Peaches	
Irene Kerwin	first base, catcher	1949	Peoria Redwings	
Helen Ketola	third base	1950	Fort Wayne Daisies	
Erma Keyes	outfield	1951	South Bend Blue Sox, Battle Creek Belles, Peoria Redwings	
Glenna Sue Kidd	pitcher, first base	1950–1954	Muskegon Lassies, Peoria Redwings, South Bend Blue Sox, Battle Creek Belles	
Mary Ellen Kimball	outfield, pitcher	1948	Racine Belles	
Nancy King	second base, shortstop	1951–1952	Kenosha Comets, Rockford Peaches	
Audrey Kissel	second base	1944	Minneapolis Millerettes	
Shirley Kleinhans	pitcher	1948	South Bend Blue Sox	
Maxine Kline	pitcher	1948–1954	Fort Wayne Daisies	
Dolores Klosowski	first base, second base, pitcher	1944–1945	Milwaukee Chicks, South Bend Blue Sox	
Theresa Klosowski	utility	1948	Muskegon Lassies	
Ruby Knezovich	catcher	1943–1944	Racine Belles	
Theresa Kobuszewski	pitcher	1946–1947	Kenosha Comets, Fort Wayne Daisies	
Phyllis Koehn	pitcher, infield/outfield utility	1943–1950	Kenosha Comets, South Bend Blue Sox, Peoria Redwings, Racine Belles, Fort Wayne Daisies, Grand Rapids Chicks	
Mary Louise Kolanko	outfield	1950	Peoria Redwings, Springfield Sallies	
Arlene Kotil	first base	1949–1951	Chicago Colleens, Muskegon Lassies, South Bend Blue Sox	
Irene Kotowicz	pitcher, outfield	1945–1950	Rockford Peaches, Fort Wayne Daisies, Kenosha Comets, Chicago Colleens, Racine Belles	
Dorothy Kovalchick	center field, third base	1945	Fort Wayne Daisies	
Ruth Kramer	pitcher, second base	1948–1949	Fort Wayne Daisies, Racine Belles	
Jaynie Krick	pitcher, infield	1948–1949, 1951–1953	South Bend Blue Sox, Peoria Redwings, Battle Creek Belles, Grand Rapids Chicks	
Marie Kruckel	outfield, pitcher	1946–1949	South Bend Blue Sox, Fort Wayne Daisies, Muskegon Lassies	
Anna Kunkel	outfield	1950–1951	South Bend Blue Sox	
Sophie Kurys	second base	1943–1950, 1952	Racine Belles, Battle Creek Belles	

== L ==
Name	Position(s)	Year(s)	Team(s)	Ref
Jean Ladd	pitcher, left field	1951	Kenosha Comets	
Joyce Lake	n/a	1953	Muskegon Belles	
Margie Lang	first base, pitcher	1943	South Bend Blue Sox	
Mary Lawson	outfield	1946	Peoria Redwings	
Beverly Leach	n/a	1947	Grand Rapids Chicks	
Noella Leduc	pitcher, outfield	1951–1954	Peoria Redwings, Battle Creek Belles, Muskegon Belles, Fort Wayne Daisies	
Annabelle Lee	pitcher, first base	1944–1948, 1950	Minneapolis Millerettes, Fort Wayne Daisies, Peoria Redwings, Grand Rapids Chicks	
Dolores Lee	pitcher, infield	1952–1954	Rockford Peaches	
Laurie Ann Lee	pitcher	1948	Racine Belles	
Josephine Lenard	second base, outfield	1944–1953	Rockford Peaches, Muskegon Lassies, Peoria Redwings, Kenosha Comets, South Bend Blue Sox	
Rhoda Leonard	second base, right field	1946	Fort Wayne Daisies	
Joan LeQuia	third base, pitcher	1953	Grand Rapids Chicks	
Ruth Lessing	catcher	1944–1949	Minneapolis Millerettes, Fort Wayne Daisies, Grand Rapids Chicks	
Mary Louise Lester	second base	1943–1944	Kenosha Comets, South Bend Blue Sox	
Barbara Liebrich	second base	1948–1954	Rockford Peaches, Kenosha Comets, Springfield Sallies, Kalamazoo Lassies	
Kay Lionikas	second base, outfield	1948–1950	Springfield Sallies, Grand Rapids Chicks Peoria Redwings	
Alta Little	first base, pitcher	1947–1948	Muskegon Belles, Fort Wayne Daisies	
Olive Little	pitcher	1943, 1945–1946	Rockford Peaches	
Claire Lobrovich	outfield	1947–1948	Kenosha Comets, Rockford Peaches	
Sarah Lonetto	infield/outfield utility, pitcher	1947–1949	Racine Belles, Muskegon Lassies	
Jean Lovell	catcher, pitcher	1948–1954	Rockford Peaches, Kalamazoo Lassies, Kenosha Comets	
Frances Lovett	pitcher	1946	Peoria Redwings	
Lillian Luckey	pitcher	1946	South Bend Blue Sox	
Shirley Luhtala	first base	1950–1951	Racine Belles, Rockford Peaches, Battle Creek Belles	
Betty Luna	pitcher, outfield	1945–1946	Rockford Peaches, South Bend Blue Sox, Chicago Colleens, Fort Wayne Daisies, Kalamazoo Lassies	
Esther Lyman	catcher	1946	South Bend Blue Sox	
