= Hlavatý =

Hlavatý (feminine: Hlavatá) is a Czech surname. Notable people include:

- Jana Hlavaty (born 1941), Czech-born American skier
- Lillian Hlavaty (1932–2009), American baseball player
- Lukáš Hlavatý (born 1983), Czech football midfielder
- Michal Hlavatý (born 1998), Czech football midfielder for Slovan Liberec
- Neil Hlavaty (born 1986), American association football player
- Václav Hlavatý (1894–1969), Czech-American mathematician
