= Steve Capus =

American businessman

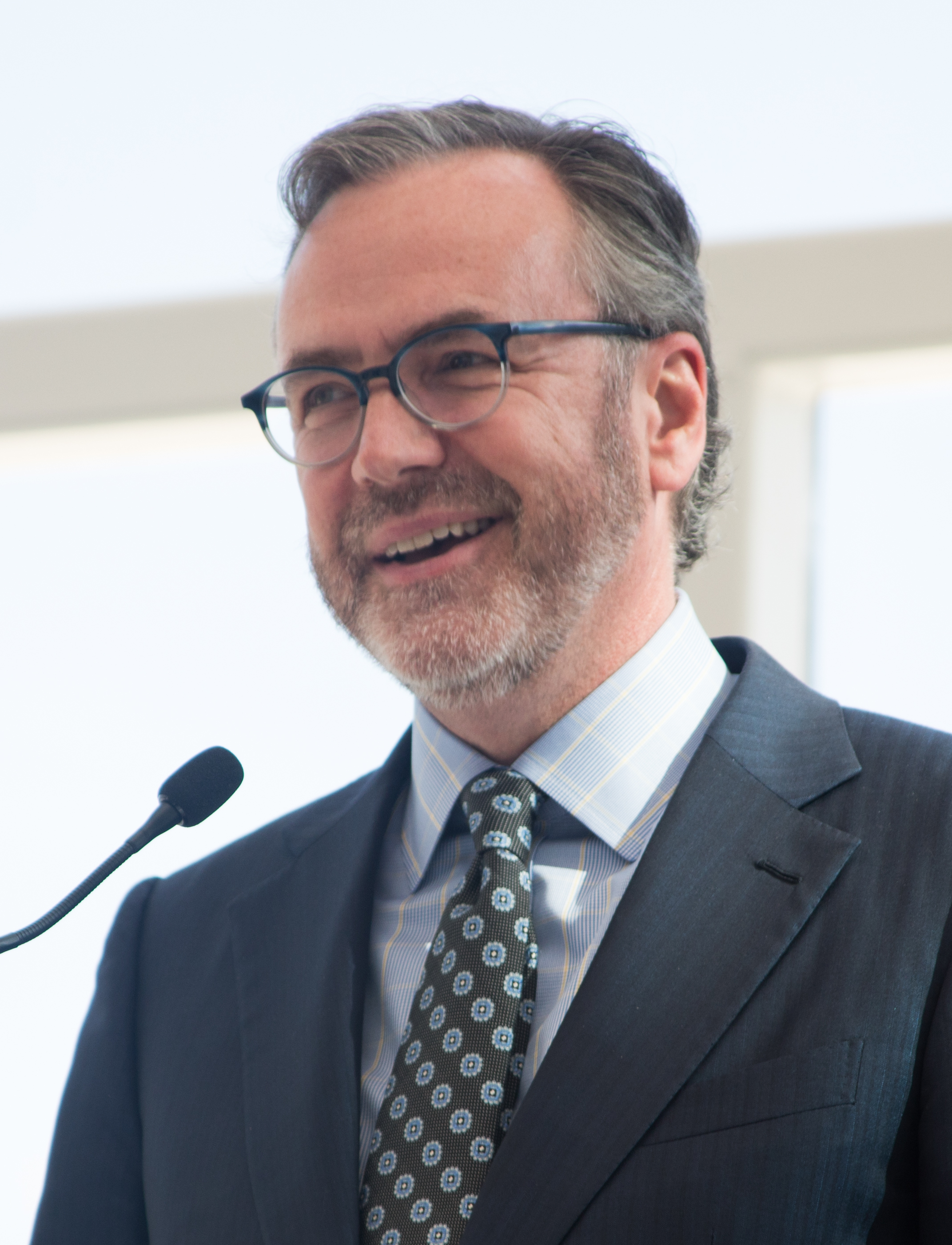
- Capus in 2019
- Born: Stephen Allan Capus; October 4, 1963 (age 63); Bryn Mawr, Pennsylvania, U.S.
- Occupations: Executive Producer of the CBS Evening News and Executive Editor of CBS News.
- Spouse: Sophia Faskianos (m. 1996)
- Children: 3

Stephen Allan "Steve" Capus (born October 4, 1963) is a news executive, producter, and journalist. He has been president of Radio Free Europe/Radio Liberty since January 2024. Previously, he was an Executive Editor of CBS News. He is the former president of NBC News.

== Early life and career ==
Steve Capus was born in 1963, the son of Jean and Paul Capus. His mother was a teacher's aide; his father was a district manager for a dental supply company. He graduated from William Tennent High School in Warminster, Pennsylvania, and went on to attend Temple University, graduating with a Bachelor of Arts in journalism in1986. Capus began his journalism career in radio and print, working at several stations and daily newspapers in the Philadelphia area. Capus was a director at WCSD-FM, a nonprofit community radio station in Warminster, in the early 1980s. He worked at WCAU-TV in Philadelphia in 1986, and became an executive producer with KYW-TV in Philadelphia in 1990.

Capus moved to Charlotte, N.C. in 1993, joining the NBC News team as the senior producer of NBC Nightside, an overnight news program.

Capus then continued his career with NBC in Manhattan. During this time, he was the broadcast producer of NBC News Sunrise and then the supervising producer for Today. From 1997 to May 2001, Capus was the executive producer of MSNBC's The News with Brian Williams. He was also the executive producer of numerous NBC News breaking reports and MSNBC special broadcasts. Among them were the 2000 presidential primaries and election, the “Summit in Silicon Valley” with Tom Brokaw and the political series 100 Days, 1000 Voices.

Capus was the executive producer of NBC Nightly News from May 2001 to June 2005. During this time, Capus was the executive producer for NBC News' coverage of the terror attacks on September 11, 2001, and the war in Iraq.

Capus was then promoted to senior vice president of NBC News, where he led the network news division, was executive in charge of MSNBC and NBCNEWS.com digital and mobile properties, and NBC News radio.

Capus served as a member of the following boards: NBC/Microsoft Joint Venture, The Weather Channel and weather.com, and The Newseum in Washington, DC.

== President of NBC News ==
In November 2005, Capus was named president of NBC News. Capus has served as the arbiter of issues involving ethics, style, standards, safety and other matters that affected the Division's journalistic bearing. Capus reported to Steve Burke, chief executive officer of NBC Universal.

Capus announced February 1, 2013, that he was leaving the network.

Steve Capus joined IESE Business School as Executive in Residence, to share his expertise. Steve Capus started a blog in January 2014 with stories and analysis about entrepreneurs, leadership, communications, journalism, politics, transformation, innovation, The Digital Revolution and big ideas.

== CBS News ==
On May 6, 2014, CBS News announced that Capus would join the Network as Executive Editor of CBS News and Executive Producer of the CBS Evening News. CBS News Chairman Jeff Fager lauded Capus as a successful journalist and news manager and said that “he is a real pro with an extraordinary record, and we are fortunate to have him joining us at CBS News.” In the announcement, CBS News President David Rhodes said that “Steve will make the Evening News more competitive than ever and will make our management team stronger than ever.”

Capus was dismissed of those duties on January 23, 2018, and replaced in that capacity by Mosheh Oinounou.

== RFE/RL ==
Stephen Capus served as Radio Free Europe/Radio Liberty’s (RFE/RL) President from January 1, 2024, until September 18, 2026. Prior to his appointment, Capus offered strategic and managerial consultation to the President of RFE/RL and advised senior management on a number of projects related to the 24/7 Russian-language digital network Current Time, as well as the new Russian language multi-platform content offering Votvot.

== Personal life ==
In 1996, he married former NBC News producer Sophia Faskianos in a Greek Orthodox ceremony in Dover, New Hampshire. He has three children.

== Awards ==
- 2004 Gerald Loeb Award for Television Short Form business journalism for "The Jobless Recovery"
