= Kenosha Comets =

Women's professional baseball team

- 1943–1951; Kenosha, Wisconsin
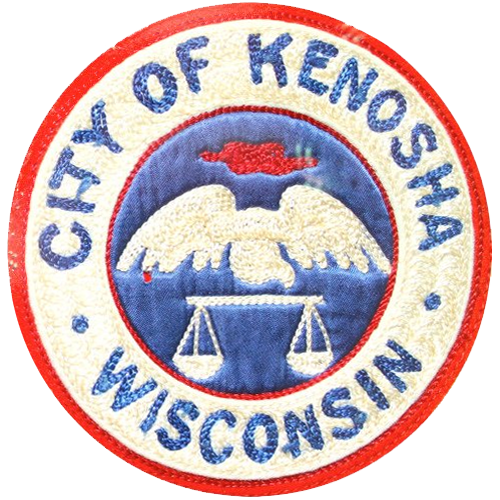
Team logo
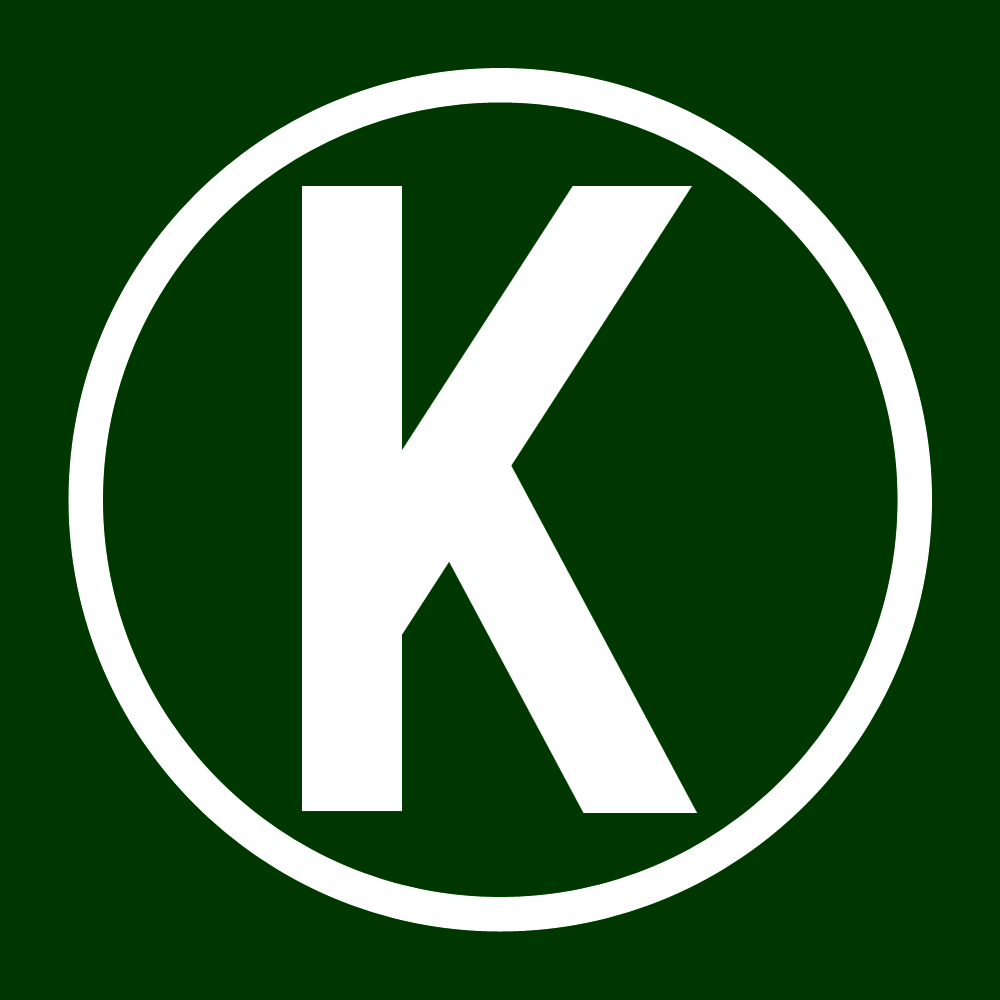
Cap insignia

Minor league affiliations
- League: All-American Girls Professional Baseball League

Team data
- Name: Shamrocks
- Colors: Green, white
- Ballpark: Lake Front Stadium (1943–1947); Simmons Field (1948–1951)
- Owner/ Operator: AAGPBL

1943 Kenosha Comets inaugural season - Back L-R: Josh Billings (Manager), Audrey Wagner, Ethel McCreary, Lee Harney, Ann Harnett, Janice O`Hara, Ada Ryan (Chaperone). Middle L-R: Phyllis Koehn, Kay Heim, Helen Westerman, Helen Nicol, Darlene Mickelsen. Front L-R: Clara Cook, Myrna Nearing, Mary Louise Lester, Shirley Jameson, Pauline Pirok.

The Kenosha Comets were a women's professional baseball team based in Kenosha, Wisconsin, that played from 1943 through 1951 in the All-American Girls Professional Baseball League (AAGPBL). The team played their home games at Kenosha's Lake Front Stadium, but later moved to Simmons Field.

== History ==
The Kenosha Comets were one of the first four teams in the AAGPBL. Unofficially nicknamed the "Shamrocks" by out of town newspapers owing to their green uniforms, a contest to name the team was won by Mrs. Hazel Templeton who chose The Comets which the team officially adopted on June 4. In 1943, the Comets posted the third-best record of the league at 56–52, but had won the second-half title (33–21) and earned a ticket to the playoffs; they were swept in three games by the Racine Belles.

Kenosha again placed third in 1944 (62–54) and made the playoffs, thanks to a first-half title (36–23). The Comets took a 3–2 lead over the Milwaukee Chicks in the best-of-seven series, but lost the decisive Game 7. Kenosha faded after that, placing last in 1945 (41–69), seventh of eight teams in 1946 (42–70), and last in 1947 (43–69).

The Comets rebounded in 1948, placing fifth (61–64) in the five–team Western Division and advancing to the playoffs, but were defeated by Racine in the first round, three games to zero. In 1949, Kenosha finished fourth (58–55) in the eight–team league, and lost to the Muskegon Lassies in two games during the first round of post–season action.

Their most productive season came in 1950, when they finished second with a 64–46 record, three games behind Racine, only to lose for the fifth straight appearance in the first round, this time to the Rockford Peaches in four games.

In 1951, Kenosha placed sixth (36–71) in the eight-team league, out of contention. The team folded at the end of the season.

In its nine years of history, the Kenosha Comets had in their rosters notable players as pitcher Helen Nicol and slugger Audrey Wagner, as well as Lois Florreich, Katie Horstman, Elizabeth Mahon, Dorothy Schroeder, and Fern Shollenberger.

== All-time roster ==
Bold denotes members of the inaugural roster

- Velma Abbott
- Janet Anderson
- **Joyce Barnes**
- **Catherine Bennett**
- Muriel Bevis
- Ethel Boyce
- Delores Brumfield
- Jean Buckley
- Mary Butcher
- Helen Callaghan
- Mary Carey
- Isora Castillo
- Jean Cione
- Lucille Colacito
- **Clara Cook**
- Mildred Deegan
- Mona Denton
- Geraldine Edwards
- Elizabeth Fabac
- Helen Filarski
- Lois Florreich
- Rose Folder
- Hermina Franks
- Barbara Galdonik
- Gertrude Ganote
- Rose Mary Glaser
- Bethany Goldsmith
- Julie Gutz
- Johanna Hageman
- Martha Haines
- Marjorie Hanna
- **Ann Harnett**
- **Elise Harney**
- Martha Hayslip
- **Kay Heim**
- Lillian Hickey
- Irene Hickson
- Alice Hohlmayer
- Beverly Holden
- Joan Holderness
- **Mabel Holle**
- Katie Horstman
- **Dorothy Hunter**
- **Shirley Jameson**
- Joan Jaykoski
- Christine Jewitt
- Marilyn Jones
- Josephine Kabick
- Marie Kazmierczak
- Nancy King
- Theresa Kobuszewski
- **Phyllis Koehn**
- Irene Kotowicz
- Jean Ladd
- Josephine Lenard
- **Mary Louise Lester**
- Barbara Liebrich
- Claire Lobrovich
- Jean Lovell
- **Ethel McCreary**
- Elizabeth Mahon
- Jean Marlowe
- Jacqueline Mattson
- Anna Meyer
- **Darlene Mickelsen**
- Pauline Miller
- Dorothy Naum
- **Merna Nearing**
- **Helen Nicol**
- Helen Nordquist
- Lex McCutchan
- Patricia O'Connor
- Anna Mae O'Dowd
- **Janice O'Hara**
- Barbara Parks
- Ernestine Petras
- Marjorie Pieper
- **Pauline Pirok**
- Mary Pratt
- Magdalen Redman
- Mary Rini
- Martha Rommelaere
- Barbara Rotvig
- Blanche Schachter
- Dorothy Schroeder
- Dorothy Shinen
- Kay Shinen
- Fern Shollenberger
- Helen Smith
- Jean Smith
- Ruby Stephens
- Jeanette Stocker
- Eunice Taylor
- Yolande Teillet
- Erla Thomas
- Gloria Tipton
- Marge Villa
- **Audrey Wagner**
- Evelyn Wawryshyn
- **Helen Westerman**
- Marian Wohlwender
- Mary Wood
- Trois Wood
- Lois Youngen

== Managers ==
* Josh Billings	1943; 1944
* Marty McManus	1944
* Eddie Stumpf	1945
* Press Cruthers	1946
* Ralph Shinners	1947
* Chet Grant	1948
* Johnny Gottselig	1949; 1950; 1951
* Ernestine Petras	1950

== Sources ==
- All-American Girls Professional Baseball League history
- All-American Girls Professional Baseball League official website – Kenosha Comets seasons
- All-American Girls Professional Baseball League official website – Manager/Player profile search results
- W. C. Madden (2000). All-American Girls Professional Baseball League Record Book. McFarland & Company. ISBN 0-7864-0597-X.
- W. C. Madden (2005). The Women of the All-American Girls Professional Baseball League: A Biographical Dictionary. McFarland & Company. ISBN 978-0-7864-2263-0.
