= Prairie View, Lake County, Illinois =

Prairie View, Illinois
- Unincorporated community
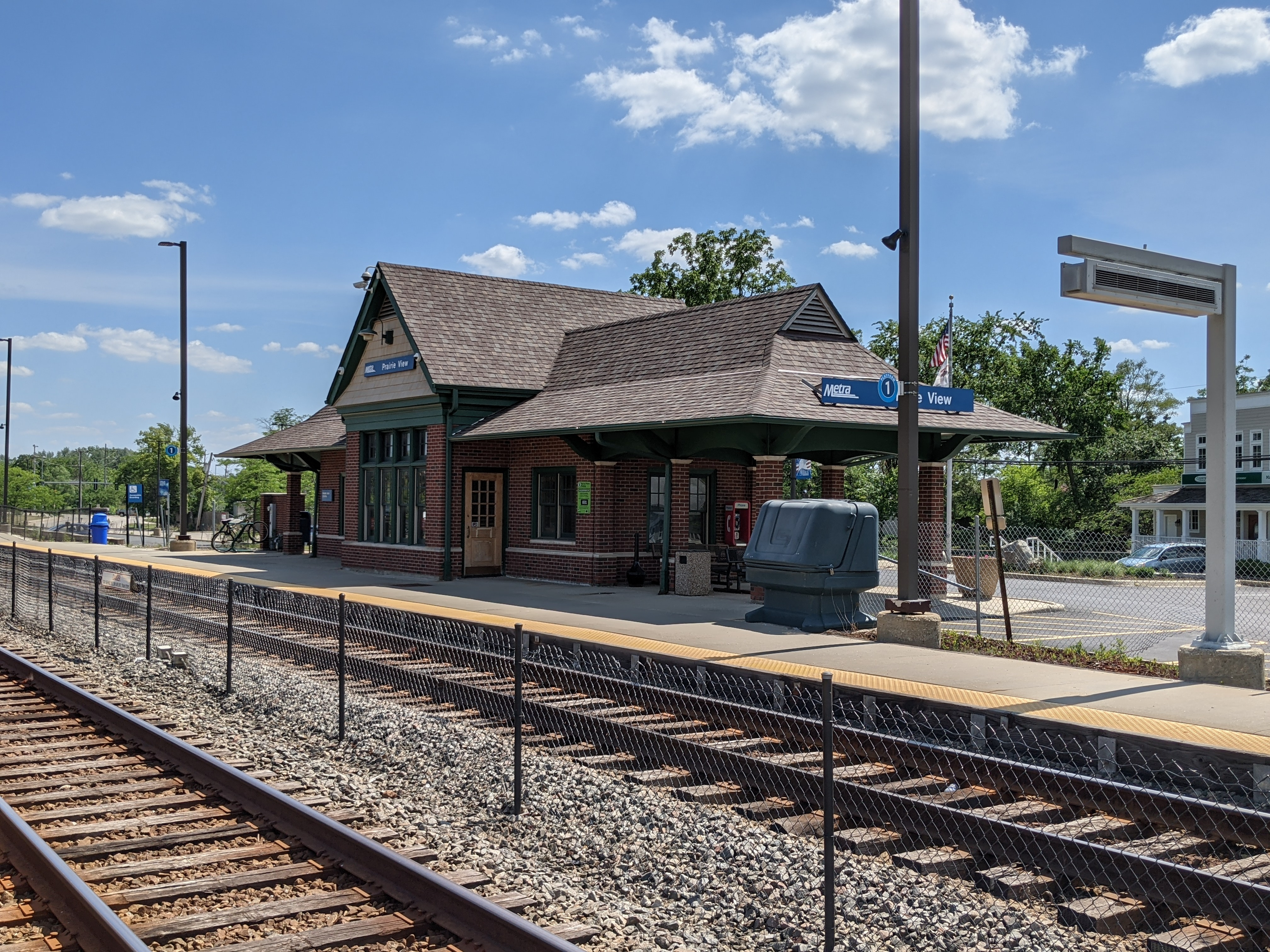
- Prairie View Metra Station

- Location in Illinois Location in the United States
- Coordinates: 42°11′58″N 87°57′45″W
- Country: United States
- State: Illinois
- County: Lake
- Township: Vernon
- Time zone: UTC-6 (CST)
  - Summer (DST): UTC-5 (CDT)
- Postal code: 60069
- Area code(s): 847, 224

Prairie View is an unincorporated community located in northeastern Illinois, in southern Lake County. It is a part of Vernon Township (the Vernon Township building was previously located in Prairie View for many years). Prairie View has not been annexed entirely by either Lincolnshire or Buffalo Grove, although tiny portions of it have been.

== Development ==
In recent years, Prairie View has been divided into two sections as surrounding towns have annexed their neighboring settlements and tiny portions of Prairie View itself.

The northern section, which contains the Prairie View Metra station, is near Adlai E. Stevenson High School (Lincolnshire, IL) and is bordered by Vernon Hills to the north, Lincolnshire to the east and Buffalo Grove to the south and west. This section receives its water, sewer, and fire emergency service from Lincolnshire; all other services are provided by Vernon Township and Lake County. A modern subdivision (consisting of about 50 homes) located in this section was built during the 1990s on what had previously been farmland and is called Krisview Acres. The original homes in the area (approximately 28), located exclusively on Easton Avenue, Main Street and a few small side streets, were built piecemeal between the late 19th century and early 1980s.

The other section is a short distance south and is completely surrounded by Buffalo Grove. This subdivision is called Horatio Gardens and is close to the Buffalo Grove train station. The residents of this subdivision resisted being overtaken by Buffalo Grove Park District and currently still defend their rights to be an independent part of unincorporated Prairie View.

== Demographics ==
Prairie View was originally made up almost entirely of white/caucasian people, however since the 1990s it has become more diverse and currently contains a very large Jewish population. A well known Chabad shul is located there.

== Schools ==
Northern Prairie View is served by Lincolnshire-Prairie View School District 103. Schools that comprise this district are Daniel Wright Junior High School, Half Day Intermediate School, and Laura B. Sprague Elementary School (all in Lincolnshire). Most inhabitants of Prairie View who attend District 103 schools graduate to Stevenson High School.

Residents of the southern portion of Prairie View are served by the Aptakisic-Tripp School district (Buffalo Grove, IL), made up of Tripp Elementary School, Pritchett Elementary School, Meridian Middle School, and Aptakisic Junior High School. Students who attend District 102 schools will go to Stevenson High School.

== Churches ==
The Westminster Reformed Presbyterian Church (founded in 1906 as the Grace Evangelical Church, later renamed Grace United Methodist Church after merging first with the United Brethren in Christ and then the American Methodist Church), is situated in Prairie View.

== Transportation ==
Prairie View station has a stop on Metra's North Central Service, which stretches from Antioch, Illinois to Chicago (at Union Station). Trains usually run on weekdays only.

== Notable people ==
- Jean Ladd (1923–2009), All-American Girls Professional Baseball League player.
- Joe Lando (born 1961), actor best known for his role of Byron Sully on the TV Series Dr. Quinn, Medicine Woman.
- Mosheh Oinounou (born 1982), former executive producer of CBS Evening News
- Hollis Sigler (1948-2001), artist.

== Image gallery ==
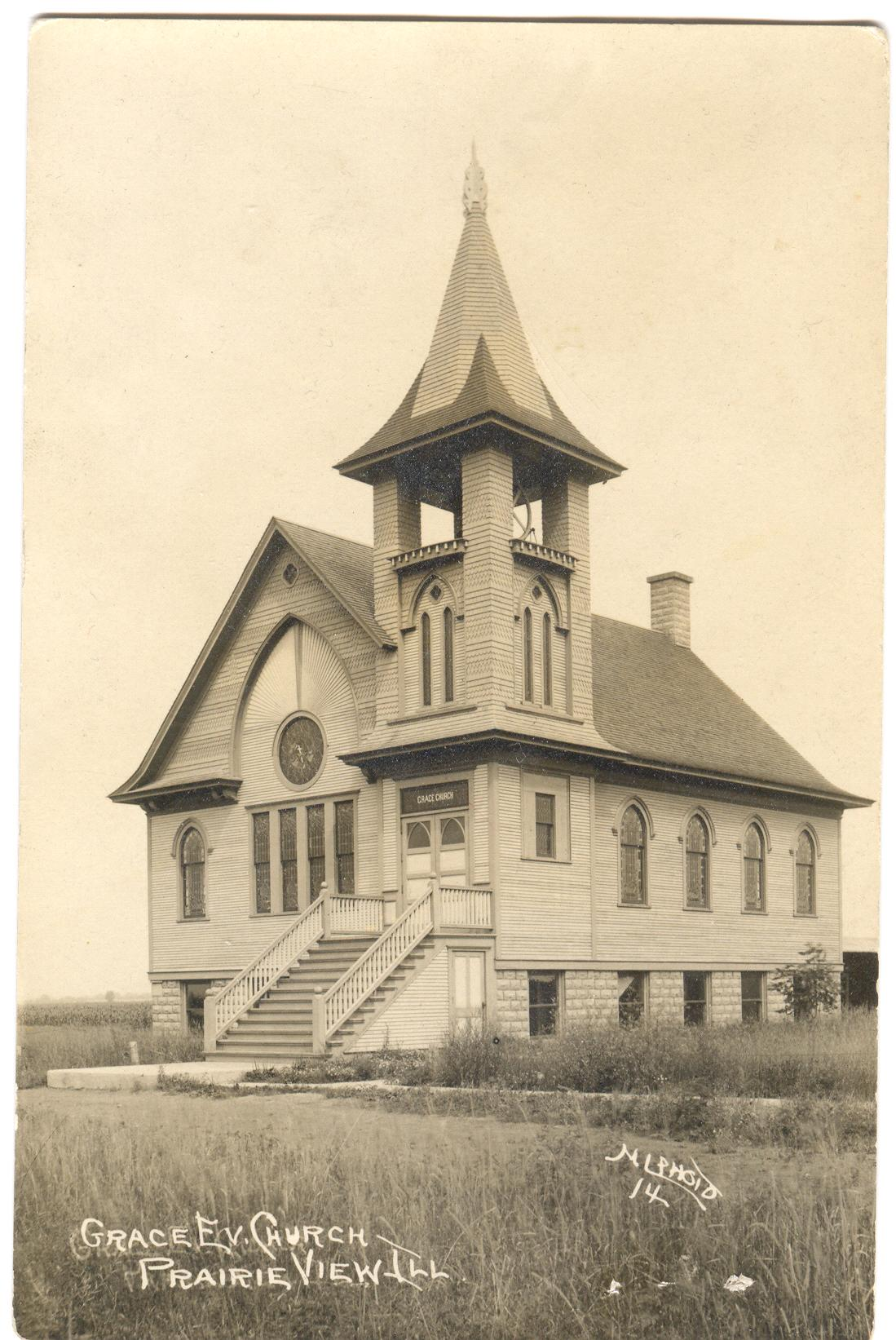
Grace Evangelical Church after completion of construction in 1906.

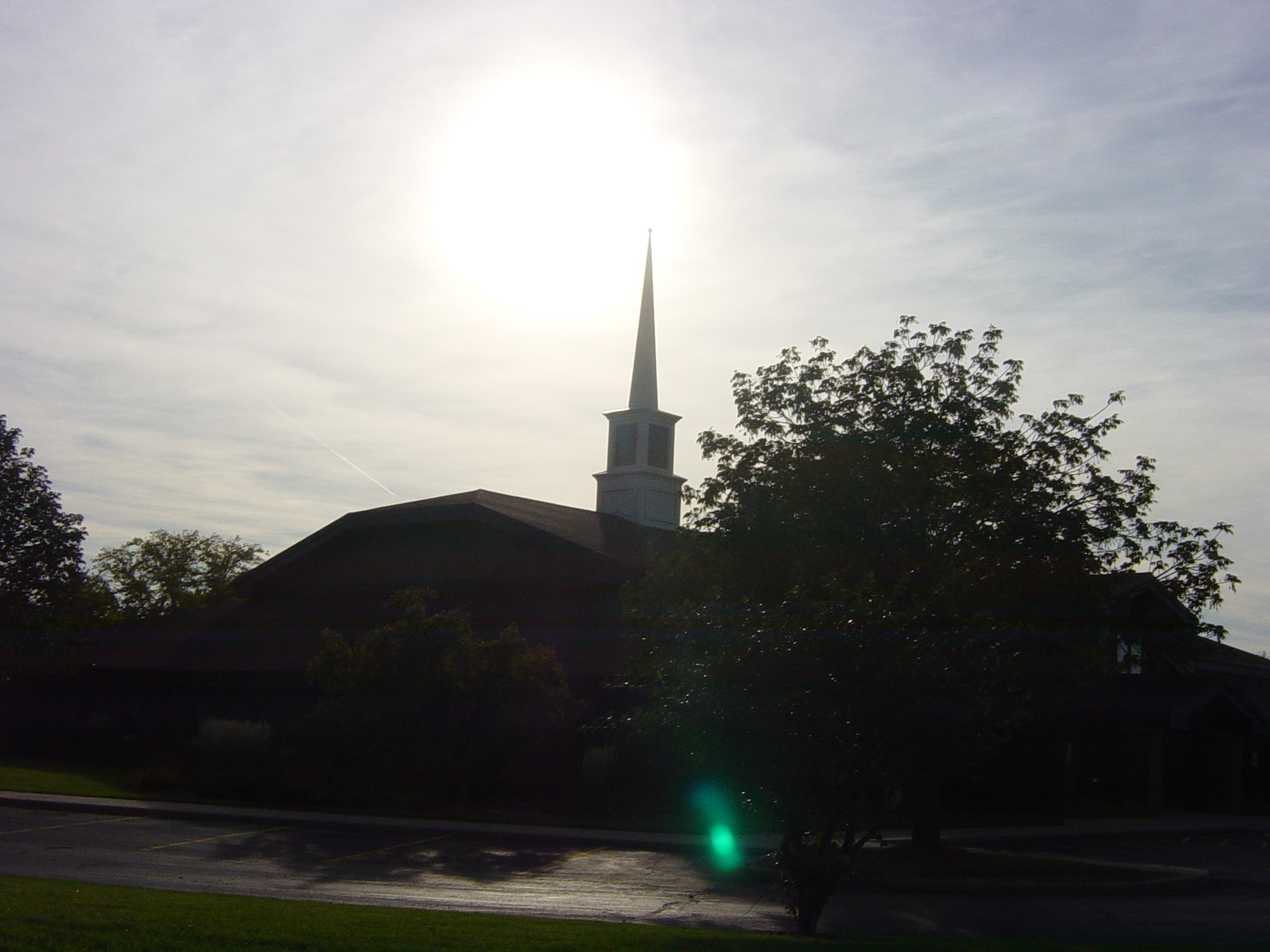
A meetinghouse of the LDS Church in Prairie View

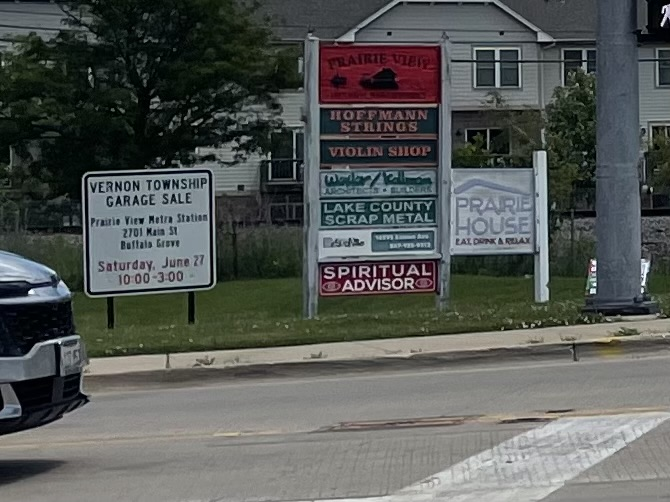
Welcome sign to the community of Prairie View

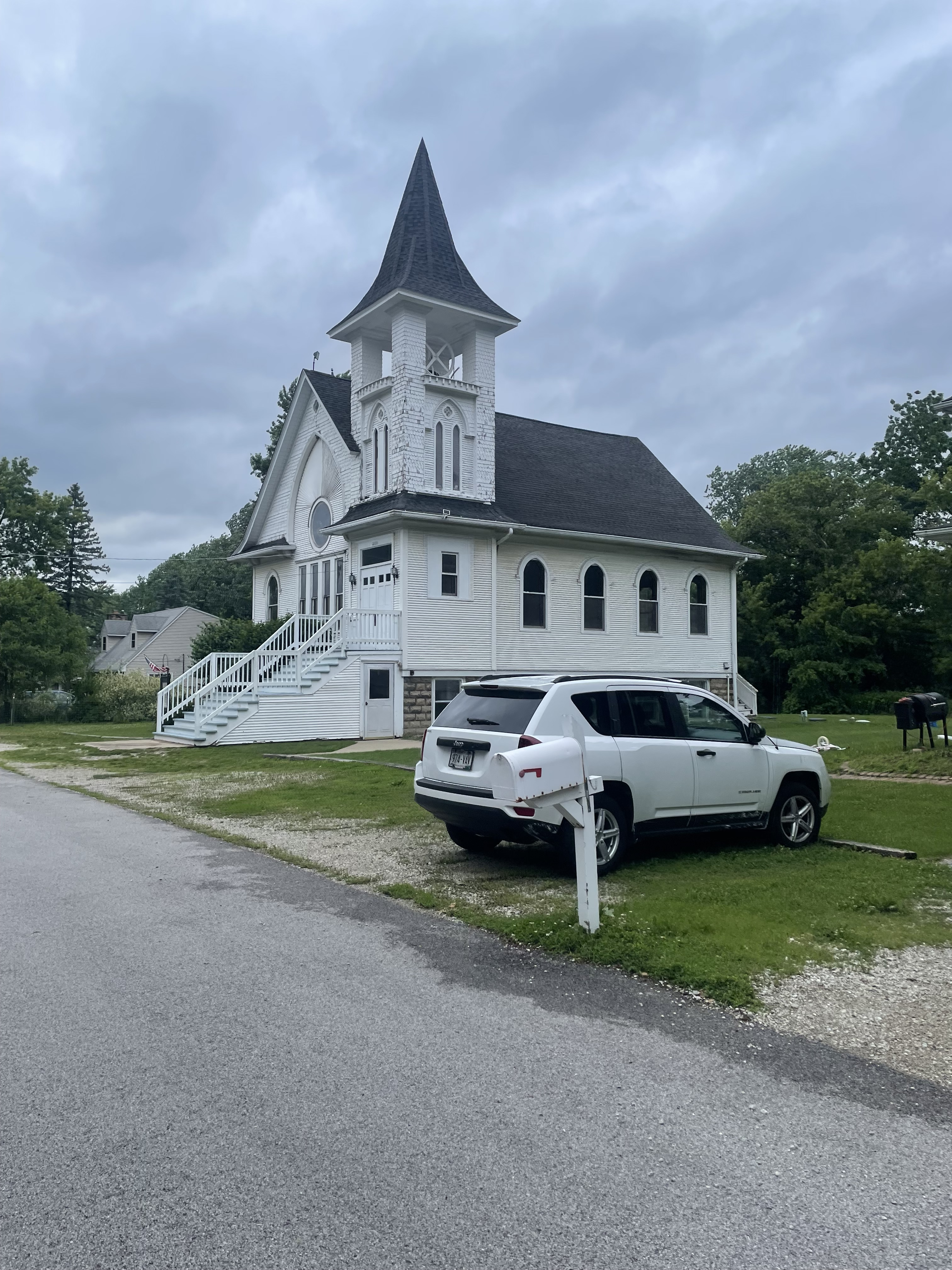
The Westminster Reformed Presbyterian Church in Prairie View

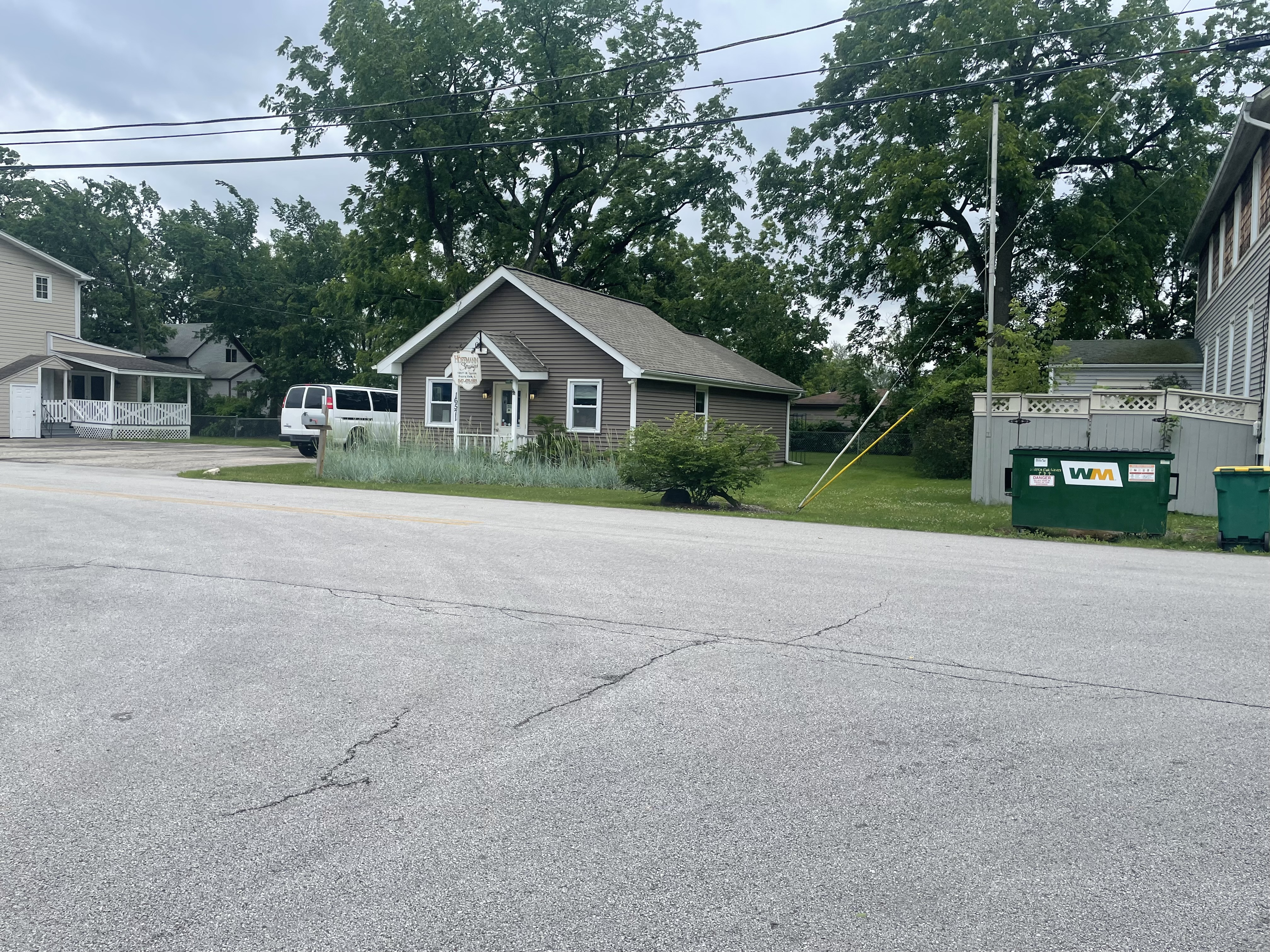
The Hoffmann Strings music shop in Prairie View, Illinois
