= Darlene Mickelsen =

American baseball player

- Outfield
- Born: September 1, 1925; Kenosha, Wisconsin, US
- Died: August 18, 1969 (aged 43); Waukegan, Illinois, US
- Batted: Right Threw: Right

Teams
- Kenosha Comets (1943); South Bend Blue Sox (1945)

Darlene Mickelsen Klammer (September 1, 1925 – August 18, 1969) was a fourth outfielder who played in the All-American Girls Professional Baseball League (AAGPBL) in parts of two seasons spanning 1943–1945. Mickelsen batted and threw right-handed. She was born in Kenosha, Wisconsin.

Darlene Mickelsen was one of the original Kenosha Comets founding members of the All-American Girls Professional Baseball League in its 1943 inaugural season.

״Mickey״, as her teammates called her, served primarily as backup outfielder for Shirley Jameson, Phyllis Koehn and Audrey Wagner, and was also the only Kenosha native to play for her hometown Comets.

She had a .199 batting average in 47 games, driving in 29 runs while scoring 20 times. Kenosha, managed by Josh Billings, placed last in the four-team league with a 43–65 record.

Mickelsen did not play the next year, but did suit up for three games for the South Bend Blue Sox in the 1945 season and went 1-for-4. She was not located after leaving the league during the midseason.

Darlene Mickelsen received further recognition in 1988 when she became part of Women in Baseball, a permanent display based at the Baseball Hall of Fame and Museum in Cooperstown, New York, which was unveiled to honor the entire All-American Girls Professional Baseball League.

== Career statistics ==
Batting

| GP | AB | R | H | 2B | 3B | HR | RBI | SB | TB | BB | SO | BA | OBP | SLG |
|---|---|---|---|---|---|---|---|---|---|---|---|---|---|---|
| 50 | 165 | 20 | 33 | 1 | 2 | 0 | 29 | 10 | 38 | 19 | 18 | .200 | .283 | .230 |

Fielding

| GP | PO | A | E | TC | DP | FA |
|---|---|---|---|---|---|---|
| 43 | 34 | 3 | 4 | 41 | 0 | .902 |
