= Hermina Franks =

American baseball player

- Pitcher
- Born: September 7, 1914; Oconto, Wisconsin, U.S.
- Died: April 7, 2010 (aged 95); Oconto, Wisconsin, U.S.
- Batted: Right Threw: Right

Teams
- Kenosha Comets (1946)

Career highlights and awards
- Women in Baseball – AAGPBL Permanent Display at the Baseball Hall of Fame and Museum (unveiled in 1988)

Hermina Franks (September 7, 1914 – April 7, 2010) was a pitcher who played in the All-American Girls Professional Baseball League (AAGPBL). Listed at 5' 4", 120 lb., Franks batted and threw right handed. She was dubbed 'Irish' by her teammates.

Hermina Franks played briefly in the early years of the All-American League.

Born in Oconto, Wisconsin, Hermina went on to work at an aircraft plant based in Lock Haven, Pennsylvania prior to enlisting in the United States Army Air Forces in 1942. She spent three and a half years in the military, of which one and a half was at overseas installations. While in the service, she also played baseball.

Following her discharge, Franks entered the league in 1946 with the Kenosha Comets and appeared in just one game for them. She went hitless in one at bat and did not have a pitching record.

Afterwards, she worked at Abbott Laboratories in Chicago during 22 years before retiring to her hometown.

In 1988 was inaugurated a permanent display at the Baseball Hall of Fame and Museum at Cooperstown, New York, that honors those who were part of the All-American Girls Professional Baseball League. Hermina Franks, along with the rest of the girls and the league staff, is included at the display/exhibit.
