= Helen Nordquist =

- Pitcher, outfielder
- Born: March 23, 1932; Boston, Massachusetts, U.S.
- Died: July 11, 2023 (aged 91)
- Batted: Right Threw: Right

Teams
- Kenosha Comets (1951); Rockford Peaches (1952–1953); South Bend Blue Sox (1954)

Career highlights and awards
- Two playoffs appearances (1952–1953); Led all outfielders in assists (1951); Women in Baseball – AAGPBL Permanent Display at Baseball Hall of Fame and Museum (1988)

Helen E. Nordquist [״Nordie״] (March 23, 1932 – July 11, 2023) was an American pitcher and right fielder who played from 1951 through 1954 in the All-American Girls Professional Baseball League (AAGPBL). Listed at 5 ft 6 in (1.68 m), 160 lb., she batted and threw right-handed.

Helen Nordquist pitched and played at outfield in the AAGPBL during the final four years of its existence. She threw a strong fastball and a good curveball, and led all outfielders for the most assists during her rookie season.

Born in Boston, Massachusetts lived in Malden, Nordquist learned to play sandlot ball with other neighborhood kids when she was eight years old. She played organized softball at high school and joined the AAGPBL right after graduation.

Nordquist entered the league in 1951 with the Kenosha Comets, appearing in a career-high 82 games while leading the league in assists. She was traded to the Rockford Peaches the next year and switched to pitching, but had control problems and allowed more walks than strikeouts, being much more effective as a hitter than as a pitcher. After two years at Rockford she joined the South Bend Blue Sox in 1954, her last season.

After the league folded, Nordquist worked as a telephone operator and an accountant in Massachusetts and a toll collector for the state of New Hampshire, retiring in 1994. In addition, she played and coached softball for more than 30 years.

Nordquist is part of Women in Baseball, a permanent display at the Baseball Hall of Fame and Museum at Cooperstown, New York unveiled in 1988, which is dedicated to the entire All-American Girls Professional Baseball League.

Helen Nordquist died on July 11, 2023, at the age of 91.

== Statistics ==
Pitching

GP	W	L	W-L%	ERA	IP	H	RA	ER	BB	SO
44	6	20	.231	5.43	209	222	197	126	189	57

Batting

GP	AB	R	H	2B	3B	HR	RBI	SB	BB	SO	BA	OBP
177	434	43	82	14	4	4	31	11	46	70	.189	.267

Collective fielding

GP	PO	A	E	TC	DP	FA
145	104	91	26	221	8	.882

== See also ==
- A League of Her Own: Helen “Nordie” Nordquist Inducted into Sports Hall of Fame. By Sara Zakaria Malden High School Print Editor-in-Chief.
