= Joyce Barnes =

American baseball player

- Pitcher
- Born: October 18, 1925; Hutchinson, Kansas, US
- Died: July 22, 2017 (aged 91); Hutchinson, Kansas, US
- Batted: Right Threw: Right

Teams
- Kenosha Comets (1943)

Career highlights and awards
- Women in Baseball – AAGPBL Permanent Display at Baseball Hall of Fame and Museum (since 1988)

Joyce Barnes [McCoy] (October 18, 1925 – July 22, 2017) was a former pitcher in the All-American Girls Professional Baseball League (AAGPBL). Listed at 5' 8", 125 lb., she batted and threw right-handed.

Born in Hutchinson, Kansas, Barnes attended Buhler High School in Reno County, Kansas. She was one of the sixty founding members of the AAGPBL for its inaugural season in 1943.

Barnes joined the Kenosha Comets club when she was only 17 years old, which is why she spent only a brief time in the league. She then returned to high school in 1944, where she showed off her athleticism in basketball, softball, volleyball and track and field.

After baseball, Barnes pursued a career as an optician during World War II. She then married William Gilbert McCoy, and they had a girl, Susan. She continued to play softball and also took up golf after retiring, while attending AAGPBL Players Association reunions in different parts of the country.

Joyce Barnes is part of the AAGPBL permanent display at the Baseball Hall of Fame and Museum at Cooperstown, New York, opened in 1988, which is dedicated to the entire league rather than any individual figure.

Banes died July 22, 2017, in Hutchinson, Kansas.
