= Mona Denton =

American baseball player

- Pitcher
- Born: January 1, 1922; Englewood, Colorado, U.S.
- Died: September 2, 1995 (aged 73); Denver, Colorado, U.S.
- Batted: Right Threw: Right

Teams
- South Bend Blue Sox (1946); Kenosha Comets (1947)

Career highlights and awards
- Women in Baseball – AAGPBL Permanent Display at Baseball Hall of Fame and Museum (1988)

Mona J. Denton (January 1, 1922 – September 2, 1995) was a right handed pitcher who played in the All-American Girls Professional Baseball League (AAGPBL). She was born in Englewood, Colorado.

Mona Denton found limited success in the league as she posted one of the worst career pitching records during her two seasons in the circuit. Nevertheless, neither team she played with gave her much run support and a consistent defense.

Denton entered the league in 1946 with the South Bend Blue Sox, pitching for them in three games before joining the Kenosha Comets in 1947. She only collected one win against 11 losses, which was not necessarily reflected in her solid 3.54 ERA in 26 pitching appearances.

She eventually left the league, and little is known of her afterward.

Denton received further recognition when she became part of Women in Baseball, a permanent display based at the Baseball Hall of Fame and Museum in Cooperstown, New York, which was unveiled in 1988 to honor the entire All-American Girls Professional Baseball League.

== Career statistics ==
Pitching

GP	W	L	W-L%	ERA	IP	H	RA	ER	BB	SO	HBP	WP	WHIP
26	1	11	.083	3.54	125	123	90	44	39	22	5	2	1.30

Batting

GP	AB	R	H	2B	3B	HR	RBI	SB	TB	BB	SO	BA	OBP	SLG
29	56	3	11	1	0	0	2	1	12	2	19	.196	.224	.214

Fielding

GP	PO	A	E	TC	DP	FA
26	10	46	5	61	1	.918
