= Ethel Boyce =

Canadian baseball player

- Catcher / First base / Outfield
- Born: June 27, 1917; Vancouver, British Columbia, Canada
- Died: August 24, 1996 (aged 79); Vancouver, British Columbia, Canada
- Batted: Right Threw: Right

Teams
- Kenosha Comets (1946)

Career highlights and awards
- Women in Baseball – AAGPBL Permanent Display at Baseball Hall of Fame and Museum (since 1988); Canadian Baseball Hall of Fame Honorary Induction (1988)

Ethel Phoebe Boyce (June 27, 1917 – August 24, 1996) was a Canadian baseball player who played in the All-American Girls Professional Baseball League (AAGPBL). Listed at 5' 8", 130 lb., she batted and threw right handed.

Born in Vancouver, British Columbia, Boyce was one of the 68 Canadians to join the AAGPBL in its twelve-year history. She appeared in five games for the Kenosha Comets in its 1946 season, and went hitless in three at-bats. An avid professional softball player in her country, Boyce was recognized for her interest in people, being particularly interested in young people and helping them to succeed in life.

The AAGPBL folded in 1954, but there is a permanent display at the Baseball Hall of Fame and Museum at Cooperstown, New York, since November 5, 1988, that honors the entire league rather than any individual figure.

Ethel Phoebe Boyce died in 1996, aged 79. In 1998, Boyce and all Canadian AAGPBL players gained honorary induction into the Canadian Baseball Hall of Fame.

That same year, Boyce's sister, Mrs. Ruth A. Laing, created the Ethel Boyce Achievement Award through a donation in the memory of her sister. The award is administered by Softball Canada and is awarded annually, to a female and a male recipient.
