= Blanche Schachter =

American baseball player

Blanche Schachter (September 20, 1923 – March 31, 2010) played in the All-American Girls Professional Baseball League in 1948. She batted and threw right-handed. The team she played for was the Kenosha Comets and the Long Island Jewels (AGSL).

Blanche was born in Brooklyn, New York. She graduated from Hunter College. She worked as an NYC schoolteacher. When she retired, Schachter became a tennis coach, tennis instructor and dog trainer. On her death in Agawam, Massachusetts, she left behind a niece (Paula) and nephew (Barry).

According to The Big Book of Jewish Baseball: An Illustrated Encyclopedia & Anecdotal History, Blanche started playing baseball with her synagogue team. The book quotes: “When she heard they were having tryouts in New Jersey for the AAGPBL, she asked her mother what she should do. Her mother said, ‘Blanche, go.’ The young woman made the ...Comets. It was the proudest day of her life.”

Blanche only played nine games with the League. She injured her knee in her final game and ended her baseball career with a batting average of .040.

== Career statistics ==
Year	G	AB	R	H	2B	3B	HR	RBI	SB	BB	SO	AVG
1948	9	25	-	1	-	-	-	-	-	-	-	.040

== Sources ==
1. AAGPBL 2. Legacy 3. Kaplan's Korner on Jews and Sports 4. Jewish Sports Collectibles
