= Geraldine Edwards =

American baseball player

- Infield/Outfield Utility
- Born: Cleveland, Ohio, U.S.

Teams
- Kenosha Comets (1951)

Career highlights and awards
- Women in Baseball – AAGPBL Permanent Display at the Baseball Hall of Fame and Museum (unveiled in 1988)

Geraldine Edwards was an All-American Girls Professional Baseball League player.

Born in Cleveland, Ohio, Edwards joined the league with the Kenosha Comets club in its 1951 season. Additional information is incomplete because there are no records available at the time of the request.

In 1988, a permanent display was inaugurated at the Baseball Hall of Fame and Museum at Cooperstown, New York, that honors those who were part of the All-American Girls Professional Baseball League. Geraldine Edwards, along with the rest of the girls and the league staff, is included at the display/exhibit.
