= Mabel Holle =

- Third base / Outfield
- Born: March 21, 1920; Jacksonville, Illinois, U.S.
- Died: December 11, 2011 (aged 91); Lake Forest, Illinois, U.S.
- Batted: Right Threw: Right

Teams
- South Bend Blue Sox (1943); Kenosha Comets (1943)

Career highlights and awards
- Women in Baseball – AAGPBL Permanent Display at Baseball Hall of Fame and Museum (1988)

Mabel B. Holle ["Holly"] (March 21, 1920 – December 11, 2011) was an American infielder and outfielder who played in the All-American Girls Professional Baseball League (AAGPBL) during the 1943 season. Listed at 5 ft 7 in (1.70 m), 125 lb, she batted and threw right-handed.

Mabel Holle was one of the sixty original players to join the All-American Girls Professional Baseball League for its inaugural season. Basically a line-drive hitter, she had a strong throwing arm and was a sure fielder at third base, center field and right field.

Born in Jacksonville, Illinois, Holle was one of four children into the family of Frederick and Kathryn Holle. She came from a baseball family, as her father was a semi-professional pitcher. She always liked to play sports with her brother and three sisters, spending most of her time outdoors. In those days girls and women could not play on their school and college teams, so she played baseball with the boys on town teams until Shirley Jameson, one of the first players who signed with the league, put her name in for the final tryout at Wrigley Field.

Holle made the final cuts and was assigned to the South Bend Blue Sox, playing for them for more of the year before being relocated to the Kenosha Comets for a short period of time. At the beginning of the 1944 season, the league did not renew her contract and made her try out again with the rookies, but this time she did not make the cut. Nevertheless, she did not give up playing and signed a contract with the rival National Girls Baseball League of Chicago to play for the next two seasons.

A graduated from MacMurray College in 1942, Holle started teaching physical education as a coach and athletic administrator in the Waukegan area schools for most of her 47-year professional career, retiring in 1990.

Since 1988 she is part of Women in Baseball, a permanent display based at the Baseball Hall of Fame and Museum in Cooperstown, New York, which was unveiled to honor the entire All-American Girls Professional Baseball League. In 1993 she was inducted in the MacMurray Sports Hall of Fame, where was created an annual award in her honor that goes to the female athlete who exemplifies leadership in the classroom and the playing field.

Mabel Holle was a longtime resident of Lake Forest, Illinois, where she died after a long illness at the age of 91.

== Career statistics ==
Batting

GP	AB	R	H	2B	3B	HR	RBI	SB	BB	SO	BA	OBP
90	332	37	66	3	1	0	21	24	22	33	.199	.249

Fielding

GP	PO	A	E	TC	DP	FA
90	145	56	14	215	2	.942
