= Mary Louise Lester =

American baseball player (1919–1977)

- Second base
- Born: January 19, 1919; Nashville, Tennessee, U.S.
- Died: December 20, 1977 (aged 58); Nashville, Tennessee, U.S.
- Batted: Right Threw: Right

Teams
- Kenosha Comets (1943); South Bend Blue Sox (1944)

Career highlights and awards
- Women in Baseball – AAGPBL Permanent Display at Baseball Hall of Fame and Museum (1988)

Mary Louise Lester (January 19, 1919 – December 20, 1977), later known as Mary Louise Luster, was an American infielder who played in the All-American Girls Professional Baseball League (AAGPBL). Listed at 5 ft 3 in (1.60 m), 138 lb, Lester batted and threw right-handed. She was born in Nashville, Tennessee.

Mary Louise Lester was one of the original founding members of the All-American Girls Professional Baseball League in its 1943 inaugural season.

In 1943, Lester attended the final tryouts of the league at Wrigley Field. Once the final cut was made, Lester and another 59 of the 280 girls who tried out were chosen to become the first women to ever play professional baseball. She was relocated to the Kenosha Comets, playing for them one year before joining the South Bend Blue Sox in the 1944 season.

Lester was used as a backup infielder, serving primarily as a backup at second base while hitting a .186 average in 112 career games. She could not be reached after leaving the league in 1944.

Mary Louise Lester is part of Women in Baseball, a permanent display based at the Baseball Hall of Fame and Museum in Cooperstown, New York, which was unveiled in 1988 to honor the entire All-American Girls Professional Baseball League. She died in Nashville on December 20, 1977, at the age of 58.

== Career statistics ==
Batting

GP	AB	R	H	2B	3B	HR	RBI	SB	TB	BB	SO	BA	OBP	SLG
112	345	43	64	4	3	0	33	25	74	50	29	.186	.289	.214

Fielding

GP	PO	A	E	TC	DP	FA
94	190	124	31	345	11	.910
