= Christine Jewitt =

Canadian baseball player

- Right field
- Born: August 3, 1926; Regina, Saskatchewan, Canada
- Died: April 24, 2018 (aged 91); Biggar, Saskatchewan, Canada
- Batted: Right Threw: Right

Teams
- Kenosha Comets (1948–1949); Peoria Redwings (1949)

Career highlights and awards
- Postseason appearance (1948); Canadian Baseball Hall of Fame induction (1998); Women in Baseball – AAGPBL Permanent Display at Baseball Hall of Fame and Museum (1988)

Christine Jewitt [Beckett] (August 3, 1926 – April 24, 2018) was a Canadian outfielder who played in the All-American Girls Professional Baseball League (AAGPBL). Listed at 5' 6", 145 lb., she batted and threw right handed.

Born in Regina, Saskatchewan Jewitt was one of the 68 players born in Canada to join the All-American Girls Professional Baseball League in its twelve years history.

She played with the Regina Army and Navy Bombers women's team before joining the league. ״Chris״, as her teammates called her, played at right field for the Kenosha Comets and Peoria Redwings in parts of two seasons spanning 1948–1949.

She had her best statistical season in 1948, when she posted a .216 average with 97 hits and 50 stolen bases in 117 games, while tying for seventh in the league for the most home runs (3).

In 1998, Jewitt gained honorary induction into the Canadian Baseball Hall of Fame. She is also part of the AAGPBL permanent display at the Baseball Hall of Fame and Museum at Cooperstown, New York, which was unveiled in 1988 to honor the entire All-American Girls Professional Baseball League.

Besides baseball, Jewitt married in 1949. She had three sons and was a grandmother of six. She lived in Biggar, Saskatchewan until her death on April 24, 2018.

== Career statistics ==
Batting

| GP | AB | R | H | 2B | 3B | HR | RBI | SB | TB | BB | SO | BA | OBP | SLG |
|---|---|---|---|---|---|---|---|---|---|---|---|---|---|---|
| 202 | 677 | 70 | 144 | 7 | 4 | 3 | 50 | 68 | 168 | 43 | 73 | ..213 | .260 | .248 |

Fielding

| GP | PO | A | E | TC | DP | FA |
|---|---|---|---|---|---|---|
| 193 | 186 | 22 | 25 | 233 | 3 | .893 |
