= Marie Kazmierczak =

- Outfield
- Born: February 14, 1920; Milwaukee, Wisconsin, U.S.
- Died: January 15, 2000 (aged 79); Three Lakes, Wisconsin, U.S.
- Batted: Right Threw: Right

Teams
- Milwaukee Chicks (1944); Racine Belles (1944); Kenosha Comets (1944)

Career highlights and awards
- Women in Baseball – AAGPBL Permanent Display at Baseball Hall of Fame and Museum (1988)

Marie Kazmierczak (February 14, 1920 – January 15, 2000) was an American fourth outfielder who played in the All-American Girls Professional Baseball League (AAGPBL) during the 1944 season. Listed at 5 ft 6 in (1.68 m), 145 lb., she batted and threw right-handed.

Born in Milwaukee, Wisconsin, Marie Kazmierczak had a humble career in her only season, even though she set a league's record for playing for three different teams based in her home state during the same season.

״Skeets״, as teammates called her, opened 1944 with her hometown Milwaukee Chicks, was traded to the Racine Belles during the midseason, and finished the year with the Kenosha Comets. Kazmierczak posted a .032 average in just 16 games.

According to her own words, she said, I didn't like riding the bench (not to play on a regular basis). Then she retired and went to work in an air conditioning plant in Wisconsin. In her spare time she enjoyed speed skating, and also played full time in the West Allis softball league without getting paid. She remained playing softball until 1954, when she took up golf. After retiring, she raised Siberian Husky puppies at her home in Three Lakes, Wisconsin.

Marie Kazmierczak is part of Women in Baseball, a permanent display based at the Baseball Hall of Fame and Museum in Cooperstown, New York, which was unveiled in 1988 to honor the entire All-American Girls Professional Baseball League.

She died in 2000 at the age of 79.

== Career statistics ==
Batting

| GP | AB | R | H | 2B | 3B | HR | RBI | SB | BB | SO | BA | OBP |
|---|---|---|---|---|---|---|---|---|---|---|---|---|
| 16 | 31 | 3 | 1 | 0 | 0 | 0 | 2 | 2 | 4 | 4 | .032 | .143 |

Fielding

| GP | PO | A | E | TC | DP | FA |
|---|---|---|---|---|---|---|
| 13 | 5 | 0 | 1 | 6 | 0 | .833 |
