= Mosheh Oinounou =

American media executive (born 1982)

- Born: May 21, 1982 (age 43)
- Education: George Washington University (BA)
- Occupation: Media executive
- Known for: Mo News
- Spouse: Alexandra Lauren Sall
- Website: www.mo.news

Mosheh Oinounou (born May 21, 1982), also known as Mosh or Mo, is an American media executive and founder of online news outlet, Mo News. Previously, he was an executive producer of CBS Evening News.

== Early life and education ==
Oinounou was raised in a Jewish family in Prairie View, Illinois. He graduated from Stevenson High School. He graduated from George Washington University with a BA in Political Communication, and an MA in Security Policy Studies. He served as editor in chief of the school's biweekly newspaper, The GW Hatchet and was active in Hillel International.

== Career ==
Oinounou began his media career as a producer at Fox News Channel, initially for Fox News Sunday, and later as the network's embedded producer traveling with the 2008 McCain presidential campaign. He then worked as an international editor at Bloomberg TV, where he covered the "Great Recession" and the Fukushima Daiichi nuclear disaster in 2011.

=== CBS ===
Oinounou joined CBS News in 2011 as a senior producer on the team that helped launch CBS This Morning, and received a News & Documentary Emmy Award in 2013 for Outstanding Investigative Journalism as a producer for CBS News Sunday Morning. He was the executive producer for the launch CBSN, a digital streaming channel by CBS. He became executive producer of CBS Evening News with Jeff Glor in January 2018, overseeing daily operations and news programming. The broadcast was nominated for multiple Emmys, and won a Murrow Award during his tenure. He announced in May 2019 that he was departing CBS News.

=== Mo News ===
Oinounou founded Mo Digital in 2020, consulting for media organizations on digital content strategy and programming. He started an online news platform on Instagram, Mo News, which is devoted to curating, reporting, and explaining the headlines. He launched a podcast and newsletter in 2022. He addressed the lessons he has learned from Mo News, and how the mainstream media can improve public trust in a TedX talk in 2022.

== Personal life ==
Oinounou married Alexandra Sall in July 2021.
