= Irene Kotowicz =

- Pitcher / Outfielder
- Born: December 10, 1919; Chicago, Illinois, U.S.
- Died: January 24, 2002 (aged 82); Elk Grove Village, Illinois, U.S.
- Batted: Right Threw: Right

Teams
- Rockford Peaches (1945); Fort Wayne Daisies (1946–1947); Kenosha Comets (1947); Chicago Colleens (1948); Racine Belles (1949–1950)

Career highlights and awards
- Single season leader in pitching appearances and innings pitched (1948); Postseason appearance (1949); Women in Baseball – AAGPBL Permanent Display at Baseball Hall of Fame and Museum (1988)

Irene K. Kotowicz ["Ike"] (December 10, 1919 – January 24, 2002) was an American pitcher and outfielder who played from 1945 through 1950 in the All-American Girls Professional Baseball League (AAGPBL). Listed at 5 ft 5 in (1.65 m), 128 lb., she batted and threw right-handed.

Irene Kotowicz was one of those pitchers who posted a solid earned run average but only had one winning season in four years, partly because she was never on a champion team and suffered from a low run support.

Born in Chicago, Kotowicz grew up playing ball with her neighborhood kids on the street at an early age, but did not start playing organized ball until she joined the Rockola Chicks of the rival National Girls Baseball League (NGBL).

Kotowicz entered the AAGPBL in 1945 with the Rockford Peaches, playing for them one year before joining the Fort Wayne Daisies (1946–1947[start]) and the Kenosha Comets (1947[end]). A below average hitter and fourth outfielder, she gradually made the transition to sidearm pitching in 1947. She had a combined 8–10 record and a 2.61 ERA in 23 games for Fort Wayne and Kenosha.

The league set a new rule for a strictly overhand pitching in 1948. Kotowicz was able to make the change, and went 18–17 with a 2.71 ERA for her hometown Chicago Colleens, an awful team who finished last with a 47–76 record, 29½ games out of the first place spot in the Eastern Division. Nevertheless, Kotowicz led all pitchers in innings pitched (298) and finished third in strikeouts (197), being surpassed only by Racine Belles' Joanne Winter (248) and Rockford's Lois Florreich (231). In addition, she tied with Rockford's Margaret Holgerson for the most games pitched (37), while tying for seventh in wins.

Kotowicz also pitched for Racine the next two years, going 8–15 with a 2.32 ERA in 1949, and 0–5 with a 4.67 ERA in 1950. The Belles advanced to the postseason in 1949. In the first round, she allowed one run in an 11-inning, 2–1 win against the Peoria Redwings to give Racine a sweep of the series. Then, she lost a dueling pitching with Holgerson, 1–0, which gave the Peaches a ticket to the final series. She gave up just two earned runs in 20 innings of work for a 0.90 ERA.

Following her baseball career, she was a buyer of men's clothing for Sears Roebuck in Chicago for 33 years. In her spare time, she enjoyed playing basketball and bowling.

In November 1988, Kotowicz, along with her former teammates and opponents, was recognized when the Baseball Hall of Fame and Museum in Cooperstown, New York dedicated a permanent display to the All American Girls Professional Baseball League.

Irene Kotowicz was a longtime resident of Elk Grove Village, Illinois, where she died in 2002 at the age of 82.

== Career statistics ==
Pitching

GP	W	L	W-L%	ERA	IP	H	RA	ER	BB	SO	WHIP
96	42	47	.472	2.73	702	503	299	213	413	315	1.30

Batting

GP	AB	R	H	2B	3B	HR	RBI	SB	BB	SO	BA	OBP
188	518	45	73	6	3	0	32	21	54	52	.141	.222

Fielding

GP	PO	A	E	TC	DP	FA
180	125	142	33	300	2	.890
