= Claire Lobrovich =

American baseball player (1923–2011)

- Outfielder
- Born: April 5, 1923; Campbell, California, U.S.
- Died: July 29, 2011 (aged 88); Watsonville, California, U.S.
- Batted: Right Threw: Right

Teams
- Kenosha Comets (1947); Rockford Peaches (1947–1948)

Claire Lobrovich Krumpotich (April 5, 1923 – July 29, 2011) was an American outfielder who played from 1947 to 1948 in the All-American Girls Professional Baseball League (AAGPBL). She batted and threw right handed.

Lobrovich was born in Campbell, California, to Mitchell and Mary (née Brayevich) Lobrovich. Her father, born Mihovil Lobrović, was Croatian, while her maternal grandparents were Slovenian emigrants. She spent two seasons in the league, including a year with the 1948 pennant-winning Rockford Peaches.

'Buttons', as her teammates dubbed her, posted a batting average of .209 (54-for-258) with three doubles and two triples in 81 games, driving in 21 runs and scoring 22 times while stealing 15 bases. At outfield, she recorded 69 putouts with seven assists and committed six errors in 82 total chances for a .927 fielding average.

In 1988, Claire Lobrovich received further recognition when she became part of Women in Baseball, a permanent display based at the Baseball Hall of Fame and Museum in Cooperstown, New York, which was unveiled to honor the entire All-American Girls Professional Baseball League rather than any individual figure.

In 1951, she married John Krumpotich, a semi-professional baseball player. Claire and John's grandson, also named John Krumpotich, owns and is revitalizing Fort Ritchie, the former army post in Cascade, MD. The site has national historical significance as it was home to the famed "Ritchie Boys" in WWII. She resided in Watsonville, California until her death in 2011.
