= Nancy King (baseball) =

American baseball player

- Second base / Shortstop
- Born: Chicago, Illinois, U.S.
- Bats: Right Throws: Right

Teams
- Kenosha Comets (1951); Rockford Peaches (1952)

Career highlights and awards
- Women in Baseball – AAGPBL Permanent Display at the Baseball Hall of Fame and Museum (since 1988)

Nancy King was an American middle infielder who played in the All-American Girls Professional Baseball League (AAGPBL). She was born in Chicago, Illinois.

Nancy King joined the league with the Kenosha Comets in the 1951 season, and was dealt to the Rockford Peaches a year later. Additional information is incomplete because there are no records available at the time of the request.

In 1988 was inaugurated a permanent display at the Baseball Hall of Fame and Museum at Cooperstown, New York, that honors those who were part of the All-American Girls Professional Baseball League. Nancy King, along with the rest of the girls and the league staff, is included at the display/exhibit.
