= Joan Jaykoski =

American baseball player

- Pitcher / Outfielder
- Born: February 23, 1933; Menasha, Wisconsin, U.S.
- Died: October 15, 2011 (aged 78); Waukesha, Wisconsin, U.S.
- Batted: Right Threw: Both

Teams
- Kenosha Comets (1951); Grand Rapids Chicks (1952)

Career highlights and awards
- Women in Baseball – AAGPBL Permanent Display at the Baseball Hall of Fame and Museum (since 1988)

Joan M. Jaykoski (February 3, 1933 – October 15, 2011) was an American outfielder and pitcher in the All-American Girls Professional Baseball League (AAGPBL). Pitching for the Kenosha Comets in 1951, she was 1–3 in 10 games, allowing 26 earned runs and 44 walks in 30 innings of work. At the plate, she hit .214 with nine hits in 42 at-bats. For the Grand Rapids Chicks in 1952, she hit .024, collecting only one hit in 41 at-bats.

She was born with the surname Jaykowski, rather than Jaykoski.
