= Joan Holderness =

American baseball player

- Shortstop
- Born: March 17, 1933; Kenosha, Wisconsin, U.S.
- Died: July 6, 2017 (aged 84); Crossville, Tennessee, U.S.
- Batted: Right Threw: Right

debut
- 1949

Last appearance
- 1951

Teams
- Kenosha Comets (1949–1950); Grand Rapids Chicks (1950–1951); Battle Creek Belles (1949)

Career highlights and awards
- Women in Baseball – AAGPBL Permanent Display Baseball Hall of Fame and Museum (1988)

Joan Holderness (March 17, 1933 - July 6, 2017) was an American member of the All-American Girls Professional Baseball League from 1949 to 1951.

== Early life ==
Joan was born in Kenosha, Wisconsin. Both her father and grandfather played a lot of ball. So she played with them. She had a bat and a ball and they had flat gloves and she remembers playing as a child. She first heard about the league when her mother took her to a ball game when she was in 5th or 6th grade for the Kenosha Comets. She loved it and immediately wished to play for the team. Her mother was strictly against this, and she refused to go to any more of the games. Holderness eventually began watching them practice, and met several ball players, who would play catch with her.

In 1947, at the age of 14, she was asked if she wanted to be Kenosha's batgirl. She accepted, received her uniform, and became the batgirl during the summer. A year later, the AAGPBL began using farm teams, and Holderness was given permission to play once a week. She played shortstop for that year, and moved up to the highest level of the league the next year.

== Career ==
In 1949, Joan was invited to go to Spring training in Indiana. It was there she got a contract which her father signed as she was only 16 (under age). But her mom wouldn't let her travel so half the year she didn't do much. But she was very well-liked and by 1950, she played more, sometimes right-field. She had a good arm and was asked to join the Grand Rapids Chicks which was in town playing against Kenosha.

Throughout her baseball career, Joan played for the Kenosha Comets (1949-1950), the Grand Rapids Chicks (1950-1951), and the Battle Creek Belles (1951). She was a versatile player, playing outfield, shortstop, and utility infield.

== After baseball ==
Following her time with the league, Joan's hobbies included fishing and bowling. In 1963, she joined the National Ladies Professional Bowling Association. In 1981, she was inducted into the Florida Women's Bowling Association Hall of Fame. A year later, she was inducted into the St. Petersburg, Florida Women's Hall of Fame and 2 years later, the Clearwater, Florida Women's Hall of Fame. Holderness died on July 6, 2017, in Crossville, TN.

== Career statistics ==
Year	G	AB	R	H	2B	3B	HR	RBI	SB	BB	SO	AVG
1949	34	48	2	8	0	0	0	8	1	2	8	.167
1950	62	175	10	26	1	1	0	10	3	20	10	.149
1951	23	61	1	9	1	0	0	10	0	8	3	.148
