= Theresa Kobuszewski =

- Pitcher
- Born: July 15, 1920; Wyandotte, Michigan, U.S.
- Died: March 22, 2005 (aged 84); Trenton, Michigan, U.S.
- Batted: right Threw: right

debut
- 1946

Last appearance
- 1947

Teams
- Kenosha Comets (1946–1947); Fort Wayne Daisies (1947)

Theresa Kobuszewski [Koby or Tracy] (July 15, 1920 – March 22, 2005) was an American pitcher who played from 1946 through 1947 in the All-American Girls Professional Baseball League (AAGPBL).

Born in Wyandotte, Michigan, Theresa Kobuszewski was a feary and respected underhand pitcher for fifteen years before joining the All-American Girls Professional Baseball League as a 26-year-old rookie in 1946.

Kobuszewski played for the Keller Girls softball team at Mack Park, which was the original home field of Detroit's Negro National League franchise Detroit Stars, and then joined the Women's Army Corps (WAC) in 1942. In the process, she was the winning pitcher in the championship game between the Army and Navy teams. Her softball experience made her an attractive selection for AAGPBL scouts. Unfortunately, she could not adjust when the league switched for a strictly overhand pitching in 1948.

Kobuszewski entered the AAGPBL in 1946 with the Kenosha Comets, playing for them one and a half years before joining the Fort Wayne Daisies in the 1947 midseason. In her rookie season she finished with a 3–9 record and a 2.71 earned run average in 123 innings of work, spanning 21 games. She improved to an 11–15 mark and a 2.42 ERA in 1947, striking out 47 batters in 208 innings while playing with both Kenosha and Fort Wayne.

In a two-season career, Kobuszewski collected a 14–24 record in 51 games, despite a solid 2.53 ERA. She also helped herself with the bat, posting a .242 batting average (30-for-124) in 52 games, while driving in six runs and scoring 15 times.

Since 1988 Kobuszewski is part of Women in Baseball, a permanent display based at the Baseball Hall of Fame and Museum in Cooperstown, New York, which was unveiled to honor the entire All-American Girls Professional Baseball League rather than individual baseball personalities. She died in Trenton, Michigan, at the age of 84.

== Pitching statistics ==
GP	W	L	W-L%	ERA	IP	RA	ER	BB	SO	HBP	WP
51	14	24	.368	2.53	331	160	93	108	103	9	5
