= Marjorie Hanna =

Canadian baseball player

- Pitcher
- Born: Calgary, Alberta, Canada
- Bats: Right Throws: Right

Teams
- Kenosha Comets (1944)

Career highlights and awards
- Women in Baseball – AAGPBL Permanent Display at the Baseball Hall of Fame and Museum (unveiled in 1988); Canadian Baseball Hall of Fame and Museum Honorary Induction (1998)

Marjorie Hanna was a Canadian pitcher who played in the All-American Girls Professional Baseball League (AAGPBL). She batted and threw right handed.

Born in Calgary, Alberta, Marjorie Hanna was one of the 68 players born in Canada to join the All American League in its twelve-year history. She made one pitching appearance for the Kenosha Comets in the 1944 season and posted a 9.00 ERA in three innings of work, giving up four hits and eight walks without strikeouts and was credited with the loss.

In 1988, Marjorie Hanna received further recognition when she became part of Women in Baseball, a permanent display based at the Baseball Hall of Fame and Museum in Cooperstown, New York which was unveiled to honor the entire All-American Girls Professional Baseball League. She later gained honorary induction into the Canadian Baseball Hall of Fame in 1998.
