= Lukáš Hlavatý =

Czech footballer

Personal information
- Date of birth: 16 March 1983 (age 43)
- Place of birth: Czechoslovakia
- Height: 1.74 m (5 ft 9 in)
- Position: Midfielder

Senior career*
| Years | Team | Apps | (Gls) |
| 2003–2006 | 1. FC Brno | 33 | (0) |
| 2006–2007 | → FC Dosta Bystrc-Kníničky (loan) | | |
| 2007 | → FC Vítkovice (loan) | | |

International career
| 2004–2005 | Czech Republic U21 | 7 | (0) |
- * Club domestic league appearances and goals

Lukáš Hlavatý (born 16 March 1983) is a Czech football midfielder. He played in the Gambrinus liga for 1. FC Brno. He also played international football at under-21 level for Czech Republic U21.
