= Kay Heim =

Canadian baseball player

- Catcher
- Born: August 21, 1917; Athabasca, Alberta, Canada
- Died: May 11, 2015 (aged 97); Rosemount, Minnesota, U.S.
- Batted: Right Threw: Right
- Stats at Baseball Reference

Teams
- Kenosha Comets (1943–1944)

Career highlights and awards
- Alberta Sports Hall of Fame honorary induction (1987); Canadian Baseball Hall of Fame honorary induction (1998)

Katherine Ann Heim (later McDaniel; August 21, 1917 – May 11, 2015) was a Canadian catcher who played in the All-American Girls Professional Baseball League (AAGPBL). Listed at 5' 6", 125 lb., Heim batted and threw right handed. She was nicknamed ״Heimie״ by her teammates.

Born in Athabasca, Alberta, Kay Heim was one of the 68 players born in Canada to join the All-American Girls Professional Baseball League in its twelve years history. She also became one of the original 60 founding members of the league in its 1943 inaugural season.

While she was a light-hitting catcher, Heim highlighted as a defensive specialist with good pitch-calling skills and possessed a strong, accurate throwing arm. She helped the Kenosha Comets win the pennant title the first year, though the team lost to the Racine Belles in the best-of-five Championship Round. The next year, she fractured an ankle during the midseason and missed the rest of the season.

She then returned home, married Ray McDaniel and decided not to return for the 1945 season. The couple had two sons, Raymond and Robert along with two children from her previous marriage, Robert and Kathleen. She moved with the family to the United States and became a citizen in 1948. Besides this, she was employed in a glass company based in Minnesota and started to play bowling and coached softball while their boys grew up.

Heim gained honorary inductions into the Alberta Sports Hall of Fame in 1987 and the Canadian Baseball Hall of Fame in 1998. She received further recognition in 1988 when she joined a group of Canadian ballplayers at Women in Baseball, a permanent display based at the Baseball Hall of Fame and Museum in Cooperstown, New York, which was unveiled to honor the entire All-American Girls Professional Baseball League.

In 1992, Heim, along with Jean Havlish and Nancy Mudge, two other Minnesota residents and former AAGPBL players, were invited to throw out the first pitch in a game Angels-Twins played at the Metrodome. The trio also was honored by the Colorado Silver Bullets all-female baseball team in their 1994 inaugural season, in which they threw out the first ball pitch of a game celebrated in Saint Paul. She died at the age of 97 in 2015 in Rosemount, Minnesota, where she lived.

== Career statistics ==
Batting

GP	AB	R	H	2B	3B	HR	RBI	SB	TB	BB	SO	BA	OBP	SLG
58	182	17	28	0	1	1	16	25	33	8	14	.154	.189	.181

Fielding

GP	PO	A	E	TC	DP	FA
56	229	40	14	283	1	.951
