= Martha Haines =

American baseball player (1923–2011)

- Second base
- Born: October 11, 1923; Covington, Kentucky, U.S.
- Died: October 4, 2011 (aged 87)
- Batted: Right Threw: Right

Teams
- Kenosha Comets (1947)

Career highlights and awards
- Women in Baseball – AAGPBL Permanent Display at the Baseball Hall of Fame and Museum (unveiled in 1988)

Martha Haines (October 11, 1923 – October 4, 2011) was an All-American Girls Professional Baseball League player.

Born in Covington, Kentucky, Haines joined the league in its 1947 season. She was assigned to the Kenosha Comets as an infielder. 'Marty', as her teammates dubbed her, appeared only in one game and went hitless in one at bat. Additional information is incomplete because there are no records available at the time of the request.

In 1988 was inaugurated a permanent display at the Baseball Hall of Fame and Museum at Cooperstown, New York, that honors those who were part of the All-American Girls Professional Baseball League. Marty Haines, along with the rest of the girls and the league staff, is included at the display/exhibit.
