= Lillian Hickey =

- Outfielder
- Born: 8 September 1922; Nelson, British Columbia, Canada
- Died: 25 September 1965 (aged 43); Nelson, British Columbia, Canada
- Batted: Right Threw: Right

Teams
- Kenosha Comets (1946–1947)

Career highlights and awards
- Women in Baseball – AAGPBL Permanent Display at the Baseball Hall of Fame and Museum (unveiled in 1988); Canadian Baseball Hall of Fame Honorary Induction (1998)

Lillian Margaret Jean Hickey (8 September 1922 – 25 September 1965) was a Canadian outfielder who played in the All-American Girls Professional Baseball League (AAGPBL). She batted and threw right-handed.

Born in 1922 in Nelson, British Columbia, Lillian Hickey was one of the sixty-eight girls from Canada who came to play baseball in the All-American League during its 12-year history.

At age 13, Lillian started playing senior softball for the Nelson Red Sox, winning the city league batting title in 1941. In between, she played basketball, bowled for a local team that won the first inter-city ladies five pin tournament, and regularly swam across Kootenay Lake, winning several swimming competitions and diving events.

Besides, Lillian worked in the Civic Centre manufacturing parts for Boeing's Catalina Bombers during World War II conflict. She then moved to Vancouver in 1942, where she played ball for the Pacifics team during three seasons.

Hickey debuted professionally in 1946 in the All-American League. She appeared in 21 games with the Kenosha Comets, hitting an average of .213 (13-for-61) with three RBI, three runs scored and one stolen base. In the field, she recorded 11 putouts with one assist and one error for a .857 fielding percentage. In 1947, she attended the AAGPBL spring training exhibition games held at the Gran Stadium in Havana, Cuba.

Afterwards, Hickey worked at the Banff Springs Hotel in Alberta and spent several years in Panama while working on a banana plantation. She returned to Nelson in the early 1950s and was active in the development of the Silver King Ski Hill, and was elected president of the Nelson Ski Club in 1954.

Lillian Hickey died in 1965 in Nelson at the age of 43. Following her death, a ski trophy in her honour was created.

The All-American Girls Professional Baseball League folded in 1954, but there is a permanent display/exhibit at the Baseball Hall of Fame and Museum at Cooperstown, New York, which was unveiled in 1988 to honor the girls and the league staff rather than any individual figure. Then in 1998, Hickey and all Canadian AAGPBL players gained honorary induction into the Canadian Baseball Hall of Fame.
