= Jean Ladd =

American baseball player

- Pitcher / Left fielder
- Born: February 26, 1923; Prairie View, Illinois, U.S.
- Died: September 29, 2009 (aged 86); Libertyville, Illinois, U.S.
- Batted: Right Threw: Right

Teams
- Kenosha Comets (1951)

Career highlights and awards
- Women in Baseball – AAGPBL Permanent Display at the Baseball Hall of Fame and Museum (unveiled in 1988)

Jean Ladd (February 26, 1923 – September 29, 2009) was an American baseball player who competed as a pitcher and left fielder in the All-American Girls Professional Baseball League (AAGPBL). She batted and threw right handed.

Born in Prairie View, Illinois, Jean Ladd made a brief appearance in fewer than ten games for the Kenosha Comets during the 1951 season.

Following her stints with the Comets, Ladd returned to her hometown and pursued a career as a high school teacher for 23 years. After retiring, she developed a passion for golf and bowling, and also actively participated in various social activities.

In 1988, Jean Ladd received further recognition when she became part of Women in Baseball, a permanent display based at the Baseball Hall of Fame and Museum in Cooperstown, New York which was unveiled to honor the entire All-American Girls Professional Baseball League.

She died in 2009 in Libertyville, Illinois, at the age of 86.
