= Lillian Hlavaty =

American baseball player

Lillian Hlavaty (June 13, 1932 – October 4, 2009) played in the All-American Girls Professional Baseball League (AAGPBL) in 1951. She threw right-handed. She was born and raised in Jessup, Pennsylvania, to Joseph and Helen Ritzco Hlavaty.

== Batting record ==
Year	GP	AB	R	H	2B	3B	HR	RBI	SB	BB	SO	BA
1951	47	127	13	24	3	0	0	5	7	20	34	.189
