= 1944 All-American Girls Professional Baseball League season =

- League: All-American Girls Professional Baseball League
- Sport: Baseball
- Teams: Six

Regular season
- Season champions: Kenosha Comets (first half); Milwaukee Chicks (second half)

Scholarship Series
- Venue: Kenosha Lake Front Stadium, Kenosha, Wisconsin
- Champions: Milwaukee Chicks

AAGPBL seasons
- 1943 1945

The 1944 All-American Girls Professional Baseball League season was the second season in the history of the league. The AAGPBL expanded in its second year of existence by adding two franchises to the original four-team format. At this point, the Milwaukee Chicks and the Minneapolis Millerettes joined the Kenosha Comets, Racine Belles, Rockford Peaches and South Bend Blue Sox. The number of games in the schedule also increased to 118, while the playoffs featured the first-half winner Kenosha against the second-half champion Milwaukee in a best-of-seven series.

In that season, the ball was decreased in size from 12 inches to 11½ inches. In addition, the base paths were lengthened to 68 feet. As a result, batting averages decreased to low .200 as pitching continued to dominate for second straight season. No batters surpassed the .300 mark, with South Bend's Betsy Jochum collecting the highest average at .296. Once again Kenosha's Helen Nicol led all pitchers in earned run average, turning in a minuscule 0.98 mark, while Minneapolis' Annabelle Lee hurled the first perfect game in league history against Kenosha. Among pitchers who threw no-hitters were Rockford's Carolyn Morris (two) and Mary Pratt, and Kenosha' Elise Harney and Nicol.

The final series was extended from three to seven games. The series went to the limit of seven games and Milwaukee clinched the championship. Despite losing Game 1, Connie Wisniewski earned the four wins to set a series record, pitching a four-hit shutout in decisive Game 7 to give the Chicks the title.

Although the Chicks won the championship, they had no local financial backing and could not compete with the American Association Milwaukee Brewers. In fact, the Chicks were forced to play all seven games of the series at Kenosha's Lake Front Stadium because the Brewers were using the Borchert Field in Milwaukee. In addition, the high ticket prices charged for AAGPBL games failed to encourage significant fan support. Due to lack of community support and skepticism of journalists, the Chicks moved to Grand Rapids, Michigan prior to the 1945 season.

The AAGPBL drew 260,000 fans during the 1944 season, which represented a 49 percent raise over the previous year.

== Teams ==
1944 All-American Girls Professional Baseball League Teams
| Team | City | Stadium |
| Kenosha Comets | Kenosha, Wisconsin | Lake Front Stadium |
| Milwaukee Chicks | Milwaukee, Wisconsin | Borchert Field |
| Minneapolis Millerettes | Minneapolis, Minnesota | Nicollet Park |
| Racine Belles | Racine, Wisconsin | Horlick Field |
| Rockford Peaches | Rockford, Illinois | Rockford Municipal Stadium |
| South Bend Blue Sox | South Bend, Indiana | Bendix Field |

== Map of teams ==
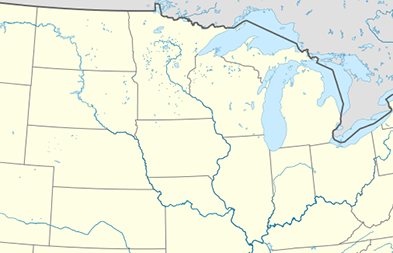
All-American Girls Professional Baseball League teams

== Standings ==
=== First half ===
| Rank | Team | W | L | W-L% | GB |
|---|---|---|---|---|---|
| 1 | Kenosha Comets | 36 | 23 | .610 | – |
| 2 | South Bend Blue Sox | 33 | 25 | .569 | 2½ |
| 3 | Milwaukee Chicks | 30 | 26 | .536 | 4½ |
| 4 | Racine Belles | 28 | 32 | .467 | 8½ |
| 5 | Rockford Peaches | 24 | 32 | .429 | 10½ |
| 6 | Minneapolis Millerettes | 23 | 36 | .390 | 13 |

=== Second half ===
| Rank | Team | W | L | W-L% | GB |
|---|---|---|---|---|---|
| 1 | Milwaukee Chicks | 40 | 19 | .678 | – |
| 2 | South Bend Blue Sox | 31 | 27 | .534 | 8½ |
| 3 | Rockford Peaches | 29 | 28 | .509 | 10 |
| 4 | Kenosha Comets | 26 | 31 | .456 | 13 |
| 5 | Racine Belles | 25 | 32 | .439 | 14 |
| 6 | Minneapolis Millerettes | 22 | 36 | .379 | 17½ |

=== Composite records ===
| Rank | Team | W | L | W-L% | GB |
|---|---|---|---|---|---|
| 1 | Milwaukee Chicks | 70 | 45 | .609 | – |
| 2 | South Bend Blue Sox | 64 | 52 | .552 | 6½ |
| 3 | Kenosha Comets | 62 | 54 | .469 | 8½ |
| 4 | Rockford Peaches | 53 | 60 | .456 | 16 |
| 5 | Racine Belles | 53 | 64 | .453 | 18 |
| 6 | Minneapolis Millerettes | 45 | 72 | .385 | 26½ |

== Postseason ==
All seven games of the championship series were played at Kenosha Lake Front Stadium in Kenosha, Wisconsin.

| Game | Date | Teams | Series lead |
|---|---|---|---|
| 1 | September 8 | Milwaukee Chicks 2, Kenosha Comets 4 | 0–1 |
| 2 | September 9 | Kenosha Comets 4, Milwaukee Chicks 1 | 0–2 |
| 3 | September 10 | Milwaukee Chicks 7, Kenosha Comets 0 | 1–2 |
| 4 | September 12 | Kenosha Comets 1, Milwaukee Chicks 7 | 2–2 |
| 5 | September 15 | Milwaukee Chicks 0, Kenosha Comets 9 | 2–3 |
| 6 | September 16 | Kenosha Comets 1, Milwaukee Chicks 2 (11 innnings) | 3–3 |
| 7 | September 17 | Milwaukee Chicks 3, Kenosha Comets 0 | 4–3 |

=== Game seven boxscore ===
| Team | 1 | 2 | 3 | 4 | 5 | 6 | 7 | 8 | 9 | R | H | E |
|---|---|---|---|---|---|---|---|---|---|---|---|---|
| Milwaukee | 0 | 0 | 0 | 0 | 0 | 0 | 2 | 0 | 1 | 3 | 4 | 0 |
| Kenosha | 0 | 0 | 0 | 0 | 0 | 0 | 0 | 0 | 0 | 0 | 3 | 7 |
Batteries: Milwaukee: Connie Wisniewski and Maguire; Kenosha: Nicol and Harnett, Colacito
Attendance: 3,166

== Batting statistics ==
| Statistic | Player | Record |
|---|---|---|
| Batting average | Betsy Jochum (SB); Helen Callaghan (MIN); Faye Dancer (MIN); Eleanor Dapkus (RAC); Merle Keagle (MIL); Vickie Panos (SB/MIL); Rose Folder (KEN); Dorothy Kamenshek (ROC); Shirley Jameson (KEN); Ann Harnett (KEN) | .296.287.274.273.264.263.261.257.253.248 |
| Runs scored | Sophie Kurys (RAC); Vickie Panos (SB/MIL); Helen Callaghan (MIN); Pauline Pirok (KEN); Betsy Jochum (SB); Merle Keagle (MIL); Claire Schillace (RAC); Shirley Jameson (KEN); Phyllis Koehn (KEN); Doris Tetzlaff (MIL) | 87; 84; 81; 73; 72; 72; 65; 64; 62; 62 |
| Hits | Betsy Jochum (SB); Dorothy Kamenshek (ROC); Helen Callaghan (MIN); Merle Keagle (MIL); Vickie Panos (SB/MIL); Eleanor Dapkus (RAC); Sophie Kurys (RAC); Phyllis Koehn (KEN); Faye Dancer (MIN); Ann Harnett (KEN) | 128; 115; 114; 107; 106; 99; 96; 91; 90; 87 |
| Doubles | Eleanor Dapkus (RAC); Pauline Pirok (KEN); Ann Harnett (KEN); Dorothy Kamenshek (ROC); Vivian Kellogg (MIN); Josephine Lenard (ROC); Lavonne Paire (MIN); Lucille Colacito (KEN); Merle Keagle (MIL); Sophie Kurys (RAC); Edythe Perlick (RAC); Lee Surkowski (SB) | 10; 10; 8; 8; 8; 8; 8; 7; 7; 7; 7; 7 |
| Triples | Josephine Lenard (ROC); Ann Harnett (KEN); Vivian Kellogg (MIN); Lois Florreich (SB); Phyllis Koehn (KEN); Faye Dancer (MIN); Mildred Deegan (ROC); Dorothy Maguire (MIL); Merle Keagle (MIL); Betty Whiting (MIL) | 10; 8; 7; 6; 6; 5; 5; 5; 5; 5 |
| Home runs | Merle Keagle (MIL); Eleanor Dapkus (RAC); Helen Callaghan (MIN); Vivian Kellogg (MIN); Elizabeth Mahon (KEN); Doris Tetzlaff (MIL); Lee Surkowski (SB); Josephine D'Angelo (SB); Faye Dancer (MIN); Betsy Jochum (SB); Mary Nesbitt (RAC); Edythe Perlick (RAC); Margaret Wigiser (MIN) | 7; 5; 3; 3; 3; 3; 3; 2; 2; 2; 2; 2; 2 |
| Runs batted in | Edythe Perlick (RAC); Sophie Kurys (RAC); Eleanor Dapkus (RAC); Faye Dancer (MIN); Merle Keagle (MIL); Vivian Kellogg (MIN); Margaret Stefani (SB); Ann Harnett (KEN); Phyllis Koehn (KEN); Doris Tetzlaff (MIL); Thelma Eisen (MIL); Mary Baker (SB) | 63; 60; 56; 48; 47; 46; 46; 45; 42; 42; 41; 41 |
| Stolen bases | Sophie Kurys (RAC); Vickie Panos (SB/MIL); Betsy Jochum (SB); Merle Keagle (MIL); Shirley Jameson (KEN); Lois Florreich (SB); Helen Callaghan (MIN); Doris Tetzlaff (MIL); Mary Baker (SB); Alma Ziegler (MIL); Pauline Pirok (KEN); Dorothy Schroeder (SB) | 166; 141; 127; 122; 119; 113; 112; 101; 92; 77; 75; 70 |

== Pitching statistics ==
| Statistic | Player | Record |
|---|---|---|
| Wins | Josephine Kabick (MIL); Carolyn Morris (ROC); Mary Nesbitt (RAC); Connie Wisniewski (MIL); Charlotte Armstrong (SB); Margaret Berger (SB); Mary Pratt (ROC/KEN); Dorothy Wiltse (MIN); Elise Harney (KEN); Helen Nicol (KEN); Amy Applegren (ROC); Viola Thompson (MIL); Joanne Winter (RAC); Catherine Bennett (SB); Betty Luna (ROC); Annabelle Lee (MIN) | 26; 23; 23; 23; 21; 21; 21; 20; 18; 17; 16; 15; 15; 14; 12; 11 |
| Earned run average | Helen Nicol (KEN); Charlotte Armstrong (SB); Margaret Berger (SB); Dorothy Wiltse (MIN); Catherine Bennett (SB); Carolyn Morris (ROC); Elise Harney (KEN); Connie Wisniewski; Annabelle Lee (MIN); Mary Pratt (ROC/KEN); Betty Luna (ROC); Josephine Kabick (MIL); Amy Applegren (ROC); Jane Jacobs (RAC); Viola Thompson (MIL); Joanne Winter (RAC); Doris Barr (SB) | 0.93; 1.51; 1.57; 1.88; 2.04; 2.15; 2.23; 2.23; 2.43; 2.50; 2.61; 2.66; 2.77; 2.82; 2.88; 2.96; 2.98 |
| Strikeouts | Dorothy Wiltse (MIN); Helen Nicol (KEN); Carolyn Morris (ROC); Mary Nesbitt (RAC); Margaret Berger (SB); Elise Harney (KEN); Connie Wisniewski; Josephine Kabick (MIL); Charlotte Armstrong (SB); Amy Applegren (ROC); Viola Thompson (MIL); Joanne Winter (RAC) | 205; 136; 112; 106; 92; 88; 82; 81; 68; 56; 52; 52 |
| Games pitched | Josephine Kabick (MIL); Mary Nesbitt (RAC); Carolyn Morris (ROC); Margaret Berger (SB); Mary Pratt (ROC/KEN); Joanne Winter (RAC); Charlotte Armstrong (SB); Dorothy Wiltse (MIN); Amy Applegren (ROC); Connie Wisniewski; Catherine Bennett (SB); Audrey Haine (MIN); Elise Harney (KEN) | 45; 45; 44; 41; 41; 40; 39; 38; 36; 36; 34; 34; 34 |
| Innings pitched | Josephine Kabick (MIL); Carolyn Morris (ROC); Mary Nesbitt (RAC); Charlotte Armstrong (SB); Margaret Berger (SB); Joanne Winter (RAC); Mary Pratt (ROC/KEN); Dorothy Wiltse (MIN); Connie Wisniewski; Elise Harney (KEN); Amy Applegren (ROC); Helen Nicol (KEN) | 366; 343; 343; 321; 315; 310; 303; 297; 291; 262; 250; 243 |

== See also ==
- 1944 Major League Baseball season
