= List of All-American Girls Professional Baseball League pitching records =

This is a list of All-American Girls Professional Baseball League pitchers who posted the best records in the history of the circuit.

== All time records ==
Minimum of 1,000 innings of work.
Bold denotes category leader.

Pitcher	ERA	GP	W	L	W-L%	IP	HA	RA	ER	BB	SO	WHIP	SO/BB
Jean Faut	**1.23**	235	140	64	.686	1780	1093	403	243	589	913	0.94	1.55
Lois Florreich	1.40	165	86	60	.589	1304	708	343	203	449	774	0.89	1.72
Connie Wisniewski	1.48	170	107	48	**.690**	1374	924	336	226	245	266	0.85	1.09
Carolyn Morris	1.55	134	80	43	.650	1032	556	266	178	286	471	**0.82**	1.65
Dorothy Mueller	1.80	186	92	63	.594	1409	974	435	282	366	657	0.95	**1.80**
Dorothy Wiltse	1.81	223	117	76	.606	1576	896	470	317	612	1004	0.97	1.64
Helen Nicol	1.89	**313**	**163**	**118**	.580	**2382**	**1579**	778	**499**	895	**1076**	1.04	1.20
Alice Haylett	1.92	128	70	47	.598	1440	690	303	223	405	390	0.76	0.96
Margaret Holgerson	1.94	168	76	69	.524	1241	832	393	267	498	599	1.07	1.06
Joanne Winter	2.06	287	133	115	.536	2159	1470	**822**	495	759	770	1.03	1.02
Betty Luna	2.12	162	74	70	.514	1207	768	429	284	524	430	1.07	0.82
Doris Sams	2.16	134	64	47	.577	1001	719	356	242	408	396	1.13	0.97
Ruth Williams	2.19	162	65	69	.485	1114	879	403	271	395	315	1.14	0.80
Annabelle Lee	2.25	186	63	96	.396	1322	1073	543	331	415	271	1.13	0.65
Mildred Deegan	2.26	146	66	59	.528	1081	755	444	271	514	412	1.17	0.80
Jean Cione	2.32	170	76	65	.539	1200	859	465	310	462	412	1.10	0.89
Josephine Kabick	2.33	151	74	72	.507	1213	948	481	314	403	245	1.14	0.61
Maxine Kline	2.34	196	116	65	.641	1518	1244	538	394	389	495	1.76	1.27
Nancy Warren	2.37	232	101	94	.518	1647	1323	607	434	475	717	1.09	1.51
Rose Gacioch	2.48	174	94	62	.603	1337	1118	545	368	412	326	1.14	0.79
Elise Harney	2.48	172	63	85	.426	1229	991	610	379	499	366	1.21	0.73
Amy Irene Applegren	2.52	206	86	98	.467	1451	905	586	407	880	501	1.23	0.57
Kay Blumetta	2.51	224	84	105	.444	1613	1183	659	445	679	673	1.57	0.99
Earlene Risinger	2.53	187	73	80	.477	1347	1073	524	379	599	578	1.24	0.96
Migdalia Pérez	2.73	155	57	70	.449	1069	1076	506	324	122	116	1.12	0.95
Elaine Roth	2.94	184	45	69	.477	1028	924	501	336	260	238	1.17	0.92
Josephine Hasham	3.15	179	58	88	.397	1164	1126	575	407	440	270	1.35	0.61
Jean Marlowe	3.18	143	56	79	.415	1075	840	474	337	450	423	1.20	0.94
Doris Barr	3.26	218	79	96	.451	1474	1021	660	458	**959**	572	1.34	0.60
Erma Bergmann	3.28	182	64	91	.413	1076	1046	627	381	462	338	1.40	0.73
Jaynne Bittner	3.38	177	66	69	.489	1126	973	529	423	647	359	1.44	0.55
Audrey Haine	3.48	167	72	70	.507	1154	851	638	446	835	493	1.46	0.59

== Single season records ==
Category	Pitcher	Club	Record	Season
Earned run average	Lois Florreich	Rockford Peaches	0.67	1949
Winning percentage	Jean Faut	South Bend Blue Sox	.909 (20-2)	1952
Games pitched	Anna Mae Hutchison	Racine Belles	51	1946
Wins	Joanne Winter; Connie Wisniewski	Racine Belles; Grand Rapids Chicks	33	1946
Losses	Annabelle Lee; Joanne Winter	Peoria Redwings; Racine Belles	23	1946; 1944
Complete games	Helen Nicol; Connie Wisniewski	Kenosha Comets; Grand Rapids Chicks	40	1945; 1946
Innings pitched	Connie Wisniewski	Grand Rapids Chicks	391	1945
Runs allowed	Joanne Winter	Racine Belles	172	1944
Earned runs	Mary Nesbitt	Racine Belles	104	1944
Hits	Josephine Kabick	Grand Rapids Chicks, Kenosha Comets	283	1946
Strikeouts	Dorothy Wiltse	Fort Wayne Daisies	293	1945
Walks	Audrey Haine	Fort Wayne Daisies, Grand Rapids Chicks	236	1946
Shutouts	Dorothy Wiltse; Joanne Winter	Fort Wayne Daisies; Racine Belles	17	1945; 1946
Hit batters	Dorothy Wiltse	Minneapolis Millerettes	44	1945
Wild pitches	Doris Barr	South Bend Blue Sox, Racine Belles	38	1945

== Single season leaders ==
*	Triple Crown winner

Season	Wins leader	Wins	ERA leader	ERA	Strikeouts leader	SO
1943	Helen Nicol (KEN)	31	Helen Nicol (KEN)	181	Helen Nicol (KEN)	220
1944	Josephine Kabick (MIL)	26	Helen Nicol (KEN)	0.93	Dorothy Wiltse (MIN)	205
1945	Connie Wisniewski (GR)	32	Connie Wisniewski (GR)	0.81	Dorothy Wiltse (GR)	293
1946	Joanne Winter (RAC); Connie Wisniewski (GR)	33	Connie Wisniewski (GR)	0.96	Dorothy Wiltse (GR)	294
1947	Anna Mae Hutchison (RAC)	27	Mildred Earp (GR)	0.68	Dorothy Wiltse (GR)	244
1948	Alice Haylett (GR); Joanne Winter (RAC)	25	Alice Haylett (GR)	0.77	Joanne Winter (RAC)	248
1949	Jean Faut (SB)	24	Lois Florreich (ROC)	0.67	Lois Florreich (ROC)	210
1950	Maxine Kline (FW)	23	Jean Faut (SB)	1.12	Lois Florreich (ROC)	171
1951	Rose Gacioch (ROC)	20	Dorothy Naum (KEN)	1.14	Jean Faut (SB)	135
1952	Jean Faut (SB); Rose Gacioch (ROC)	20	Jean Faut (SB)	0.93	Jean Faut (SB)	114
1953	Jean Faut (SB); Eleanor Moore (GR)	17	Jean Faut (SB)	1.51	Jean Faut (SB); Marie Mansfield (ROC)	143
1954	Maxine Kline (FW)	18	Janet Rumsey (SB)	2.18	Dolores Lee (ROC)	94

== Sources ==
- All-American Girls Professional Baseball League Record Book – W. C. Madden. Publisher: McFarland & Company, 2000. Format: Softcover, 294pp. Language: English. ISBN 978-0-7864-3747-4

== See also ==
- All-American Girls Professional Baseball League batting records
- All-American Girls Professional Baseball League fielding records
