= Thelma Grambo =

Canadian baseball player

- Catcher
- Born: October 28, 1923; Domremy, Saskatchewan, Canada
- Died: July 30, 2001 (aged 77); Central Butte, Saskatchewan, Canada
- Batted: Right Threw: Right

Teams
- Grand Rapids Chicks (1946)

Career highlights and awards
- Women in Baseball – AAGPBL Permanent Display at the Baseball Hall of Fame and Museum (unveiled in 1988); Canadian Baseball Hall of Fame Honorary Induction (1998)

Thelma Josephine Grambo (later Hundeby; October 28, 1923 – July 30, 2001) was a Canadian catcher who played in the All-American Girls Professional Baseball League (AAGPBL). Listed at 5' 7", 165 lb., she batted and threw right handed.

Born in Domremy, Saskatchewan, Thelma Grambo was one of the 68 players born in Canada to join the All-American Girls Professional Baseball League in its twelve years history.

Grambo started to play softball at age 8 in public school. She attended grades one through twelve at Northern Light School. Following her training at Normal School in Saskatoon, she taught at schools near Canwood, Viscount, and Young but did not get much chance to play sports, except for joining the Saskatoon Pats softball team in 1942. She continued playing in Saskatoon until an All-American League scout noticed her and gave her an opportunity to play in the league.

Afterwards, Grambo was sent to Pascagoula, Mississippi for spring training and was assigned to the Grand Rapids Chicks in 1946. She served as a backup for Ruth Lessing and had the chance to catch pitchers such as Connie Wisniewski, Josephine Kabick, Alice Haylett and Audrey Haine. Unfortunately, her career was cut short when she broke the index finger of her throwing hand early in the season. She returned to Canada and married Robert Hundeby in 1947 and never returned to the league. The couple established in Elbow, Saskatchewan, where they raised their seven children on the family farm. Their extended family includes 16 grandchildren.

The All-American Girls Professional Baseball League folded in 1954, but there is a permanent display at the Baseball Hall of Fame and Museum at Cooperstown, New York, since 1988 that honors the entire league rather than any individual figure. In 1998, Thelma and all Canadian AAGPBL players gained honorary induction into the Canadian Baseball Hall of Fame. She is also a member of the Saskatchewan Baseball Hall of Fame and the Saskatoon Sports Hail of Fame.

Thelma Grambo Hundeby died in 2001 at Regency Manor in Central Butte, Saskatchewan, aged 77.
