= Lorraine Fisher =

- Pitcher
- Born: July 5, 1928; Detroit, Michigan, U.S.
- Died: November 9, 2007 (aged 79); Detroit, Michigan, U.S.
- Batted: right Threw: right

Teams
- Rockford Peaches (1947); Grand Rapids Chicks (1948–1949)

Career highlights and awards
- Two playoffs appearances (1948–1949)

Lorraine Fisher (later Stevens; July 5, 1928 – November 9, 2007) was a right-handed pitcher who played from 1947 through 1949 in the All-American Girls Professional Baseball League (AAGPBL).

== Summary ==
A native of Detroit, Michigan, Lorraine Fisher had a brief but effective role as a pitcher in the All-American Girls Professional Baseball League. A hard-thrower, she also combined defensive skills along with good fielding abilities, playing at outfield when not pitching.

Fisher entered the league in 1947 with the Rockford Peaches, a team managed by Eddie Ainsmith, who used her sparingly as a starter in a strong rotation that included Mildred Deegan, Lois Florreich and Rose Gacioch. As a rookie, Fisher posted a 4–4 record in just 13 games. Rockford finished sixth in the eight-team league with a 48–63 mark, out of contention, while Fisher was dealt to the Grand Rapids Chicks before the 1948 season.

The AAGPBL grew to an all-time peak of ten teams in 1948, representing Eastern and Western zones, just in the first year the circuit shifted to strictly overhand pitching. As an underhand pitcher, Fisher made the adjustments, relying on a strong fastball and a breaking curve. She posted a 16–11 record, joining forces with Alice Haylett (25–5) and Mildred Earp (15–14), to give Grand Rapids three aces at a time when most teams would settle for two in their rotation. Grand Rapids, with Johnny Rawlings at the helm, won the East Division with a 77–47 mark, 10½ games ahead of the second place Muskegon Lassies (66–57). The Chicks defeated the South Bend Blue Sox in the first round of the playoffs, three to two games, but were swept in three games by the expansion Fort Wayne Daisies in the next round.

The league returned to the eight-team format in 1949. Fisher finished with a 13–11 record in 25 pitching appearances, while Grand Rapids failed to repeat the success of the previous season. The team finished third, at 57–54, but advanced to the playoffs. In the first round, Grand Rapids took revenge on Fort Wayne, beating them in three games, but lost in the semifinals to eventual champion Rockford, three games to one.

In 1950 Fisher stayed in Detroit, where she married and raised seven children. Over the years, 15 grandchildren and one great granddaughter were the highlights of her life.

Lorraine Fisher died in her home of Jackson, Michigan at the age of 79 years. She is part of Women in Baseball, the AAGPBL permanent display at the Baseball Hall of Fame and Museum at Cooperstown, New York, which was unveiled on November 5, 1988 in honor of the entire league rather than individual baseball personalities.

== Career statistics ==
Batting

GP	AB	R	H	2B	3B	HR	RBI	SB	TB	BB	SO	BA	OBP	SLG	OPS
131	327	29	45	2	1	0	18	7	49	28	30	.138	.206	.150	.355

Pitching

GP	W	L	W-L%	ERA	IP	RA	ER	BB	SO
70	33	26	.559	2.53	467	188	129	230	127
