= Betty Luna =

American barbells player (1927–2004)

- Pitcher/Outfielder
- Born: May 1, 1927; Dallas, Texas, U.S.
- Died: July 13, 2004 (aged 77); Los Angeles, California, U.S.
- Batted: Right Threw: Right

Teams
- Rockford Peaches (1944, 1947); South Bend Blue Sox (1945–1946); Chicago Colleens (1948); Fort Wayne Daisies (1949–1950); Kalamazoo Lassies (1950)

Career highlights and awards
- Two playoff appearances (1946, 1949); Two no-hitters (1945, 1947); Ranks 10th for the best earned run average in the All-time list; Women in Baseball – AAGPBL Permanent Display at Baseball Hall of Fame and Museum (1988)

Betty Luna [Hill] (May 1, 1927 – July 13, 2004) a pitcher and outfielder who played from 1944 through 1950 in the All-American Girls Professional Baseball League (AAGPBL). Listed at 5 ft 5 in (1.65 m), 133 lb., she batted and threw right-handed.

A native of Dallas, Texas, Betty Luna hurled two no-hitters during her seven seasons in the All-American Girls Professional Baseball League. A hard-thrower, she was one of the few pitchers to make the successful transition from underhand to overhand through the many stages of the circuit, although she pitched on awful expansion teams that did not give her much run support.

Luna entered the league in 1944 with the Rockford Peaches, playing for them one year before joining the South Bend Blue Sox (1945–1946). She returned to Rockford (1947) and then found herself on the move again, this time to the Chicago Colleens (1948), Fort Wayne Daisies (1949–1950) and Kalamazoo Lassies (1950).

In her rookie season, Luna posted a 12–13 record and a 2.61 earned run average as part of a Peaches rotation that included Carolyn Morris (23-18, 2.15) and Mary Pratt (21-15, 2.61).

In 1945 she went 14–15 for South Bend, ending fifth in the league for the best ERA (1.53) as third in the Blue Sox rotation after Doris Barr (20-8, 1.71) and Charlotte Armstrong (18-22, 1.98). Luna hurled four shutouts in a stretch, including her first career no-hitter on August 6 of that year.

Her most productive season came in 1946, when she went 23–13 with a 2.30 ERA in a career-high 298 innings pitched, ranking second behind Grand Rapids Chicks' Connie Wisniewski (366), and sixth in winning percentage (.638).

In 1947, Luna went 11–14 with a 1.65 ERA during her second stint with the Peaches. The next year she finished with a 12–9 mark and a 1.95 for the helpless Colleens, who ended 47–77 in the Eastern Division 29 1/2 games out of the first spot.

Luna opened 1949 with the Peaches, ending 2–6 with a 3.90 in only ten pitching appearances, even though she pitched the second no-hitter of her career. She divided her playing in 1950 with Fort Wayne and Kalamazoo, playing exclusively at outfield while hitting a .237 average with two home runs and 50 runs batted in in 100 games, ranking fourth in doubles (18) behind Betty Foss (24), Sophie Kurys (22) and Thelma Eisen (20).

She finished with a 74–70 record in 162 pitching appearances and 1–1 with a 2.00 ERA in two postseason games, while her 2.12 career ERA ranks for 10th place in the all-time list.

In 1988, she became part of Women in Baseball, a permanent display based at the Baseball Hall of Fame and Museum in Cooperstown, New York, which was unveiled to honor the entire All-American Girls Professional Baseball League.

Luna was a long time resident of Los Angeles, where she died at the age of 77.

== Career statistics ==
Pitching

GP	W	L	W-L%	ERA	IP	H	RA	ER	BB	SO	WHIP
162	74	70	.514	2.12	1207	768	429	284	524	430	1.07

Batting

GP	AB	R	H	2B	3B	HR	RBI	SB	BB	SO	BA	OBP	SLG
296	953	96	213	30	10	5	102	60	102 BB	90	.224	.299	.292

Fielding

GP	PO	A	E	TC	DP	FA
238	406	29	28	471	8	.964

== See also ==
- AAGPBL pitching records
