= Patricia Courtney =

American baseball player

- Third base
- Born: October 8, 1931; Everett, Massachusetts, U.S.
- Died: July 12, 2003 (aged 71); Everett, Massachusetts, U.S.
- Batted: Right Threw: Right

Teams
- Grand Rapids Chicks (1950); Chicago Colleens (1950)

Career highlights and awards
- Women in Baseball – AAGPBL Permanent Display at Baseball Hall of Fame and Museum (1988)

Patricia A. Courtney (October 8, 1931 – July 12, 2003) was an infielder who played in the All-American Girls Professional Baseball League (AAGPBL). Listed at 5 ft 5 in (1.65 m), 125 lb (57 kg), she batted and threw right handed.

Born in Everett, Massachusetts, Pat Courtney graduated from Everett High School, where she excelled in sports. Courtney started playing softball under the guidance of Ed English, a talented multi-sport athlete. She later played in a Catholic Youth basketball team coached by Maddy English, who was Ed's kid sister. English was already playing in the AAGPBL since its foundation in 1943, and was who arranged for the league's 1950 tryouts to be held locally at the Everett Recreation Center. Courtney was invited for a further tryout at South Bend, Indiana in 1950, and was selected to play third base for the Grand Rapids Chicks. She spent one month with Grand Rapids, and was transferred to the Chicago Colleens for more training.

The Colleens was a rookie travelling team that toured with the Springfield Sallies. Both teams played exhibition games against each other as they travelled primarily through the eastern half of the United States, while including matches at Yankee Stadium in New York City, Griffith Stadium in Washington, D.C., Municipal Stadium in Cleveland, and Delorimier Stadium in Montreal.

Courtney collected a batting average of .059 (1-for-17) in 10 games with the Chicks and posted .181 (30-for-166) in 44 games for the Sallies.

Following her AAGPBL stint, Courtney enrolled in evening courses at Bentley College in the Boston area, finishing at the top of her Revenue Agent class. She then was hired as an accountant by the Internal Revenue Service, spending a thirty-year-plus career with the IRS after becoming one of the first women to break into the ranks of the then all male bastion of revenue agent.

After retirement in 1988, she enjoyed her winters in Fort Myers, Florida, the spring training home for the Boston Red Sox. She kept active playing golf, attending AAGPBL Players Association reunions in different parts of the country, and doing volunteer tax work with low income wage earners.

The same year, Pat received further recognition when she became part of Women in Baseball, a permanent display based at the Baseball Hall of Fame and Museum in Cooperstown, New York, which was unveiled to honor the entire All-American Girls Professional Baseball League.

In September 1990 she was honored at Fenway Park, where she threw the ceremonial first pitch before a Red Sox home game against the Milwaukee Brewers. She was joined in the ceremony by her fellows Patricia Brown, Maddy English and Mary Pratt, other Massachusetts residents who played significant roles in the All-American Girls Professional Baseball League.

In 1992, Pat was invited by filmmaker Penny Marshall for the filming of A League of Their Own, appearing as an extra during the Women in Baseball display opening. She also was included in the New England Sports Museum, and donated some memorabilia to the AAGPBL display in the museum.

Patricia Courtney died in her homeland of Everett, Massachusetts at the age of 71, following complications from stomach cancer.

== Batting statistics ==
GP	AB	R	H	2B	3B	HR	RBI	SB	TB	BB	SO	BA	OBP	SLG
54	183	23	31	1	0	0	12	1	32	23	24	.169	.262	.175
