= Ruth Williams (baseball) =

- Pitcher
- Born: February 12, 1926; Nescopeck, Pennsylvania, U.S.
- Died: February 10, 2005 (aged 78); Ambler, Pennsylvania, U.S.
- Batted: Right Threw: Right

Teams
- Racine Belles (1946); Fort Wayne Daisies (1946); South Bend Blue Sox (1947–1950); Peoria Redwings (1950); Kalamazoo Lassies (1950–1953)

Ruth Williams [Heverly] (February 12, 1926 – February 10, 2005) was an American pitcher who played from 1946 through 1953 in the All-American Girls Professional Baseball League (AAGPBL). Listed at 5 ft 4 in (1.63 m), 139 lb., she batted and threw right-handed.

Ruth Williams debuted in the AAGPBL as a 20-year-old rookie and had a solid if unspectacular career that spanned eight seasons. Used as a spot starter and reliever, Williams collected at least ten wins in five of those seasons, while her 2.19 career earned run average ranks her twelfth in the all-time list of AAGPBL pitchers with at least 1,000 innings of work. During her career she hurled eight two-hitters, one of them a no-hitter going into the ninth inning of a contest.

Born in Nescopeck, Pennsylvania, Williams began playing softball at age 12 in a church league. When she was a sophomore at East Stroudsburg University, Williams played for the New York Traders, a fastpitch softball team that paid her travel and food expenses for her to play during the weekends. After her father read about the AAGPBL in a Philadelphia Inquirer advertisement, he motivated his daughter to attend a tryout in Allentown. About 400 girls attended, and three days later she received an offer to join the league.

Williams opened 1946 with the Racine Belles, but ten days later was transferred to the Fort Wayne Daisies. She was relegated to a bench role for most of the year, pitching in just one game while striking out a batter in one inning. She was traded to the South Bend Blue Sox a year later. Meanwhile, she finished her Physical Education and General Science degrees from ESU and began teaching at Wissahickon High School in Ambler, Pennsylvania.

In 1947, Blue Sox manager Chet Grant gave Williams a chance to join the pitching rotation, which included the experimented Jean Faut, Phyllis Koehn and Ruby Stephens. Williams responded with a 12–8 record and 1.70 ERA in 25 games, striking out 48 in 180 innings. Her performance slacked to a 10–10 mark and a 2.25 ERA in 1948, but she still managed to strike out 55 and collect 160 innings in 23 games.

Her most productive season in 1949, when she posted a 10–6 record with a career-high 1.64 ERA, which ranked her as the ninth best in ERA and winning percentage (.625), helping her team tie for first place with the Rockford Peaches. Since she was still teaching in Pennsylvania, the Blue Sox flew Williams in for the Memorial Day weekend in order to pitch. She then won two games and returned to school to finish out the school year.

Williams started 1950 with South Bend, but was traded to the Peoria Redwings during the midseason and ended the year with the Kalamazoo Lassies. She combined for a 5–10 record with a 3.47 ERA in just 19 games. She did not have much run support from the Lassies and recorded losing records for the remaining three years of career by going 10–11, 10–12 and 8–12. Nevertheless, she posted low earned runs averages of 1.96, 2.48 and 2.12, pitched a career-high 174 innings in 1952, and finished ninth in ERA in 1951.

Following her baseball career, Williams married Leonard Heverly and continued her work in Ambler. The couple adopted two sons, Richard and Mike, but tragedy struck in 1980 when her husband died in a traffic collision caused by a drunk driver. She retired after the accident.

Williams later attended the AAGPBL Players Association reunions. The association was largely responsible for the opening of Women in Baseball, a permanent display based at the Baseball Hall of Fame and Museum in Cooperstown, New York, which was unveiled in 1988 to honor the entire All-American Girls Professional Baseball League.

In 1995 Ruth Williams Heverly suffered a heart attack, which slowed her life down considerably for the next ten years. She died at her home in Ambler, Pennsylvania, just two days short of her 79th birthday.

== Pitching statistics ==
Regular season

GP	W	L	W-L%	ERA	IP	H	RA	ER	BB	SO	WHIP
162	65	69	.485	2.19	1114	879	403	271	395	315	1.14

Postseason

GP	W	L	W-L%	ERA	IP	H	RA	ER	BB	SO
4	1	2	.333	2.19	29	19	7	7	7	6

== Sources ==
- Nickels, Thom (2014). Legendary Locals of Center City Philadelphia. Arcadia Publishing. ISBN 978-1-4671-0141-7.
