= Patricia Brown (baseball) =

American baseball player

- Pitcher
- Born: April 21, 1931; Winthrop, Massachusetts, U.S.
- Died: June 17, 2012 (aged 81); Park Ridge, Illinois, U.S.
- Batted: Right Threw: Right

Teams
- Chicago Colleens (1950); Battle Creek Belles (1951)

Career highlights and awards
- Women in Baseball – AAGPBL Permanent Display at Baseball Hall of Fame and Museum (1988)

Patricia Irene Brown (April 23, 1931 – June 17, 2012) was a pitcher who played in the All-American Girls Professional Baseball League (AAGPBL). Listed at 5' 5", 135 lb., she batted and threw right handed.

Like many players, Pat Brown had a brief career in the All-American Girls Professional Baseball League because she felt that the schedule was demanding and the continuing trips interfered with her studies. She then went on to obtain four degrees and be listed in four different Who's Who directories for her accomplishments during a law librarian career that spanned forty years of dedicated service to Suffolk University in Boston.

Born in Winthrop, Massachusetts, Patricia was the youngest of four children in the family of Joseph and Harriet (née Taylor) Brown. While growing up, she had two dreams: to play baseball and to attend college. She was told she could not play baseball because she was a girl and could not attend college because she had no money. Nevertheless, she achieved both of these dreams.

Brown started playing sandlot ball at an early age with her brothers Joseph Jr., Thomas and Alan and their neighborhood friends. Playing sandlot baseball was a real struggle for me at first. I was so tired of hearing that I should go home and play with my dolls that I wanted to cry, she remembered. But the young Pat did not scream at the boys. She just bided her time. From time in time I played first base, second base, and shortstop, as well all three outfield positions. I never dared to volunteer to be the catcher, and luckily no one ever asked me to catch, she added.

From 1946 through 1948 Brown attended Winthrop High School, where she excelled in basketball, field hockey and tennis. Under the direction of Ellen Kiernan, she was a member of the field hockey team that played outside schools for the first time since before World War II.

Nevertheless, Brown did not play organized softball until being in high school. Even Little League Baseball had started in 1939 in South Williamsport, Pennsylvania, Winthrop did not as yet have a Little League team. Not that it mattered to her, because girls were not allowed to play baseball. It not was until 1974 that Little League announced, almost reluctantly, that its teams were open to girls.

Following her graduation, Brown became interested in the All-American Girls Professional Baseball League after reading about it in a Boston newspaper. She sent a letter to the league's headquarters in Chicago. Pretty soon she received a letter asking her to come to a tryout involving hundreds of girls. She was not considered, but in 1950 a second chance came. This time she made a good impression on the league's scouts with her strong throwing arm. Finding women who could pitch was a problem for the league, she explained.

Brown was signed as a pitcher and was assigned to the Kenosha Comets. But Comets manager Johnny Gottselig felt she had control issues and need refinement, so she was sent to the Chicago Colleens development touring team. Brown was promoted to the Battle Creek Belles in 1951, but she did not have much of a chance to show her abilities.

She collected a 9-9 pitching record for the Colleens, while posting a .298 batting average and a .394 on-base percentage in 23 games. Her stint with the Belles was limited to two innings of shutout ball in one pitching appearance.

Brown attended Suffolk University during the off-season, but when the college would not release her early in order to play and the league would not allow her to report late in the season, she opted to quit baseball and decided to concentrate on her studies.

She then earned Bachelor of Arts (1955), Juris Doctor (1965) and Master of Business Administration (1970) degrees from Suffolk University, and a MTS degree from Gordon–Conwell Theological Seminary (1977).

Brown was admitted to the Massachusetts Bar Association in 1965. She received her Librarian's Certification in 1963 and her Law Librarian's Certification in 1967. She then had a 40-year career as the Law Librarian and Professor at Suffolk University. In addition, she was a longtime member of the Winthrop Council on Aging; the SHINE Program (Serving Health Information Needs of Elders) counseling at the Winthrop Senior Center, retiring as a Law Librarian Emeritus in 1992.

In 1988 Brown received further recognition when she became part of Women in Baseball, a permanent display based at the Baseball Hall of Fame and Museum in Cooperstown, New York, which was unveiled to honor the entire All-American Girls Professional Baseball League.

Then, in September 1990, she was invited to throw the ceremonial first pitch at a Boston Red Sox home game against the Milwaukee Brewers at Fenway Park. She was joined in the ceremony by Patricia Courtney, Maddy English and Mary Pratt, other Massachusetts residents who played significant roles in the All-American Girls Professional Baseball League.

Besides this, Brown received numerous awards and recognitions over the years. She appears listed in the Who's Who in America, Who's Who in American Law, Who's Who in the East, and Who's Who of American Women directories.

In February 1990, the Women's Sports Foundation presented her with an award For Outstanding Service in Women's Sports, during the governor's annual Massachusetts Women in Sports Day at the State House in Boston. She also was honored at the dedication of the Suffolk University girls' basketball team first home game in their new gym in February 1991, and was inducted in the First Annual Winthrop High School Hall of Fame in March 1997.

By 1993, she spent over a year working with the New England Sports Museum to organize an All-American Girls Professional Baseball League display. She formed a working group that included former AAGPBL players Wilma Briggs and Marie Mansfield, as well as the aforementioned Maddy English, Mary Pratt and herself, of course. The finished exhibition contains assorted pictures, an original contract, and baseball spikes, gloves and uniforms, among other memorabilia.

She wrote A League Of My Own: Memoir of a Pitcher for the All-American Girls, which was published by McFarland & Company, in 2003. In her book, she shares her thoughts on the league's history, including what Philip K. Wrigley sought to do by creating the AAGPBL in 1943, what happened after that, and why the league folded after its twelve years of existence. I feel like I have finally pitched my no-hit game, she commented about her book.

Patricia Brown died in Park Ridge, Illinois, at the age of 81.
