= Ruth Mason (baseball) =

Canadian baseball player

- Utility player
- Born: Moose Jaw, Saskatchewan, Canada

Teams
- Grand Rapids Chicks (1953)

Ruth Mason was a Canadian outfielder who played in the All-American Girls Professional Baseball League (AAGPBL).

Born in Moose Jaw, Saskatchewan, Ruth Mason was one of the 68 players born in Canada to join the All League in its twelve years history. She was assigned to the Grand Rapids Chicks club in the 1953 season, where she shared the outfield duties with eight other players during her only season in the league.

Afterwards, Mason remained in the United States to play in the National Girls Baseball League of Chicago with the Parichy Bloomer Girls in the 1951 and 1953 seasons. In between, she played for the Miami Beach Belles of the International Professional Softball League in 1952.

The All-American Girls Professional Baseball League folded in 1954, but there is a permanent display at the Baseball Hall of Fame and Museum at Cooperstown, New York, since 1988 that honors the entire league rather than any individual figure.

Then in 1998, Ruth Mason and all Canadian AAGPBL players also gained honorary induction into the Canadian Baseball Hall of Fame.
