= Philomena Gianfrancisco =

American baseball player

- Outfield
- Born: April 20, 1923; Chicago, Illinois, U.S.
- Died: January 18, 1992 (aged 68); Chicago, Illinois, U.S.
- Batted: Left Threw: Right

Teams
- Grand Rapids Chicks (1945–1947); Racine Belles (1948)

Career highlights and awards
- Women in Baseball – AAGPBL Permanent Display at Baseball Hall of Fame and Museum (1988)

Philomena Theresa Gianfrancisco (later Zale; April 20, 1923 – January 18, 1992) was an outfielder who played from 1945 through 1948 in the All-American Girls Professional Baseball League (AAGPBL). Listed at 5 ft 2 in (1.57 m), 134 lb., she batted left-handed and threw right-handed.

Born in Chicago, Illinois, Gianfrancisco had the longest name in league history. Nicknamed ״Phil״ or ״Frisco״ by her teammates, she joined the league in 1945 with the Grand Rapids Chicks, playing for them three years before joining the Racine Belles (1948).

Her most productive season came in 1946, when she posted a career-best .226 batting average in 98 games, ranking eighth in runs batted in (53) and ninth in doubles (9), while tying for sixth in home runs (2).

In 1947, Gianfrancisco suffered a severe knee injury, which sidelined her for most of the season. She then underwent surgery to correct a major problem. In 1948 she came back and helped Racine to reach the postseason, appearing in a career-high 114 games while batting .204 with four homers and 45 RBI. Two years later, in 1949, she left the league to become boxer Tony Zale's manager and booking agent. The two married in 1970. She worked as a physical education teacher for more than 25 years and specialized in teaching the hearing impaired at St. Francis De Sales Catholic High School in Chicago and for the Chicago Park District.

Gianfrancisco is part of Women in Baseball, a permanent display based at the Baseball Hall of Fame and Museum in Cooperstown, New York, which was unveiled in 1988 to honor the entire All-American Girls Professional Baseball League. She died four years later in her hometown of Chicago at the age of 68.

== Career statistics ==
Batting

GP	AB	R	H	2B	3B	HR	RBI	SB	TB	BB	SO	BA	OBP	SLG
265	877	87	180	23	5	6	94	73	231	106	88	.205	.318	.263

Fielding

GP	PO	A	E	TC	DP	FA
255	201	29	11	241	78	.954
