= Edith Barney =

American baseball player

- Catcher
- Born: February 3, 1923; Bridgeport, Connecticut, U.S.
- Died: March 23, 2010 (aged 87); North Port, Florida, U.S.
- Batted: Right Threw: Right

Teams
- Grand Rapids Chicks 1948

Edith "Little Red" Barney (February 3, 1923 – March 23, 2010) was a female catcher who played for the All-American Girls Professional Baseball League (AAGPBL) during the 1948 season. Listed at 5' 6", 136 lb., she batted and threw right-handed.

Barney is part of the AAGPBL permanent display at the Baseball Hall of Fame and Museum at Cooperstown, New York, opened in 1988, which is dedicated to the entire league rather than any individual player. She died in North Port, Florida, at the age of 87.
