= Colleen Smith =

Canadian baseball player

- Third base
- Born: May 31, 1925; Vancouver, British Columbia, Canada
- Died: December 28, 2018 (aged 93)
- Batted: Right Threw: Right

Teams
- Grand Rapids Chicks (1949)

Colleen Smith (May 31, 1925 – December 28, 2018) was a Canadian infielder who played in the All-American Girls Professional Baseball League (AAGPBL). Listed at 5' 6", 120 lb., Smith batted and threw right-handed. She was born in Vancouver, British Columbia.

Colleen Smith was one of the 68 players born in Canada to join the AAGPBL in its twelve-year history. She made 40 appearances at third base for the Grand Rapids Chicks in its 1946 season, posting a batting average of .184 (18-for-98) with four RBI and seven runs scored, including a double and three stolen bases. As a fielder, she collected 45 putouts and 81 assists, committing 11 errors in 137 chances for a .920 career fielding average.

After baseball, Smith became an accomplished golfer, winning the Amateur Crown and Senior Crown five times.

The AAGPBL folded in 1954, but there is a permanent display at the Baseball Hall of Fame and Museum at Cooperstown, New York, since November 5, 1988, that honours the entire league rather than any individual figure.

In 1998, Colleen Smith and all Canadian AAGPBL players gained honorary induction into the Canadian Baseball Hall of Fame.

She died on December 28, 2018.
