= Julia Hardin =

American baseball player

- Third base
- Born: Macon, Georgia, US

Teams
- Grand Rapids Chicks (1946)

Career highlights and awards
- Women in Baseball – AAGPBL Permanent Display at the Baseball Hall of Fame and Museum (unveiled in 1988)

Julia Hardin was an All-American Girls Professional Baseball League player. She was born in Macon, Georgia.

According to All-American League data, Julia Hardin played at third base for the Grand Rapids Chicks during the 1946 season. Nevertheless, additional information is incomplete because there are no records available at the time of the request.

The All-American Girls Professional Baseball League folded in 1954, but there is a permanent display at the Baseball Hall of Fame and Museum at Cooperstown, New York, since 1988 that honors the entire league rather than any individual figure.
