= Elsie Wingrove =

Canadian baseball player

- Outfield
- Born: September 26, 1923; Saskatoon, Saskatchewan, Canada
- Died: July 13, 2016 (aged 92); Estevan, Saskatchewan, Canada
- Batted: Right Threw: Right

Teams
- Fort Wayne Daisies (1946); Grand Rapids Chicks (1946–1947)

Career highlights and awards
- AAGPBL champion (1947); Canadian Baseball Hall of Fame induction (1998)

Elsie "Earl" Wingrove (September 26, 1923 – July 13, 2016) was a Canadian outfielder who played from 1946 through 1947 in the All-American Girls Professional Baseball League (AAGPBL). Listed at 5' 6", 130 lb. she batted and threw right-handed.

Born in Saskatoon, Saskatchewan, Elsie Wingrove was one of the 68 players born in Canada to join the All-American Girls Professional Baseball League in its twelve-year history.

While growing up on a farm, Wingrove learned to play baseball with her two brothers and sister and father. "Every Sunday the neighbors congregated at our farm; the kids played ball in the pasture, the men played horseshoes in the laneway and the ladies picked fruit from our garden," she recalled in an interview. At age nine, she joined the girl's adult team. She later had the opportunity to play multiple sports at high school, including ice hockey, track and field, curling and fastpitch softball, while also playing five-pin bowling in a commercial league.

After high school, Wingrove was employed as a bank teller and attended Saskatoon Technical College, where she played for its softball team, the Saskatoon Pats. In 1946, during Western league fastball playoffs, she was spotted by an AAGPBL talent scout who invited her to a try out at Pascagoula, Mississippi. She made the grade and was assigned to the Grand Rapids Chicks after spring training, but was loaned out to the Fort Wayne Daisies for a few weeks during her rookie season. After returning to Grand Rapids, she became part of the championship squad in the 1947 season.

A light-hitting, good defensive player, Wingrove was able to fill in at all outfield positions, mainly at center field, compiling a .181 career average in 119 games, while committing only seven errors in 147 fielding chances for a solid .952 percentage. "I always had a desire to hit a ball over the wall at Grand Rapids. The closest I came was hitting the wall," she explained.

״Windy״, as her teammates called her, married immigration officer Russell Earl in 1948, which spelled an end to her playing career. She raised two boys, Norman and Gary, and became a customs broker. She also helped her husband coach Little League Baseball and junior girls fastpitch softball while working for the Canadian customs. Eventually, sometimes she filled in on the border league men's team when they were lacking players. She retired in 1988 and began to attend AAGPBL Players Association reunions with her spouse.

The association was largely responsible for the opening of Women in Baseball, a permanent display based at the Baseball Hall of Fame and Museum in Cooperstown, New York, which was unveiled in 1988 to honour the entire All-American Girls Professional Baseball League. Besides her AAGPBL recognition, she gained honorary induction into the Canadian Baseball Hall of Fame in 1998.

== Career statistics ==
Batting

GP	AB	R	H	2B	3B	HR	RBI	SB	TB	BB	SO	BA	OBP	SLG
119	353	30	64	7	1	0	15	28	73	20	40	.181	.225	.207

Fielding

GP	PO	A	E	TC	DP	FA
112	124	16	7	147	2	.952
