= Lois Barker =

American baseball player (1923–2018)

- Third base / Right field
- Born: April 7, 1923; Dover, New Jersey, U.S.
- Died: February 14, 2018 (aged 94); Morristown, New Jersey, U.S.
- Batted: Right Threw: Right

Teams
- Grand Rapids Chicks (1950)

Career highlights and awards
- Playoff appearance (1950)

Lois Anna "Tommie" Barker (April 7, 1923 – February 14, 2018) was an American utility player who played in the All-American Girls Professional Baseball League (AAGPBL) during the 1950 season. Listed at 5 ft 3 in, 130 lb, she batted and threw right-handed.

Born in Dover, New Jersey, Barker was one of seven girls in a nine-sibling family. While growing up in Chester Borough, she used to watch her father coach baseball teams and her brother's career as an Olympic track athlete.

In an interview, Barker recalled catching batting practice for a local men's team when she was eight years old. She admitted to growing up "more boy than girl". The reason, she explained matter-of-factly, stems from the nickname she received as an infant – Tommie. In fact, her family thought she would be a boy and had a name all picked out, Thomas Henry. As she told the story, her brothers and sisters, when passing her crib, would exclaim, "There's our Tommie!", and the name stuck.

Barker graduated from Roxbury High School, where she played softball. She started to play in organized leagues and tournaments in 1947 with the Chester Farmerettes, being able to play all positions except catcher. In one game, she turned an unassisted triple play while playing at shortstop. After making the league at tryouts held in Irvington, she signed a contract and went to the AAGPBL rookie camp in South Bend, Indiana.

Barker entered the league in 1950 with the Grand Rapids Chicks, being used primarily in the outfield and at third base. Making the AAGPBL at age 27 as a rookie, was the fulfillment of a lifelong dream. Grand Rapids, managed by Johnny Rawlings, took fourth place with a 59–53 record and advanced to the postseason, but lost in the first round of the best-of-five series to the Fort Wayne Daisies. Baker was a .125 hitter in 32 games and received a contract for the 1951 season, but she was unable to play due to family commitments.

Following her baseball career, Barker took a job in a company connected with the aerospace industry, working at all the way from entry level to supervisor during 40 years, until her retirement in 1990. She also played softball for about ten years after she obtained permission to play amateur sports again.

Barker is part of Women in Baseball, a permanent display based at the Baseball Hall of Fame and Museum in Cooperstown, New York, which was unveiled in 1988 to honor the entire All-American Girls Professional Baseball League rather than any individual personality. She also was honored by the Chester Historical Society in 1999, during the Chester Township's Bicentennial Parade celebration.

After retirement, Barker focused much of her time and energy visiting friends and family and traveling to reunions of the AAGPBL Players Association. Besides this, she spent countless hours responding to request for autographs and corresponding with young athletes interested in hearing of her days in the league. She lived in Chester Borough, New Jersey, and loved to watch baseball and travel.

Barker died February 14, 2018, in Morristown, New Jersey.

== Career statistics ==
Batting

GP	AB	R	H	2B	3B	HR	RBI	SB	BB	SO	BA	OBP
32	64	4	8	0	0	0	3	0	6	15	.125	.200

Fielding

GP	PO	A	E	TC	DP	FA
31	16	1	1	18	0	.944
