= Helen Smith (baseball) =

American baseball player (1922–2019)

- Infielder
- Born: January 5, 1922; Richmond, Virginia, U.S.
- Died: January 17, 2019 (aged 97); Richmond, Virginia, U.S.
- Batted: Right Threw: Right

Career statistics
- Batting average: .183
- Games played: 27
- Hits: 11

Teams
- Kenosha Comets (1947); Grand Rapids Chicks (1948)

Helen "Gig" Smith (January 5, 1922 – January 17, 2019) was an American utility infielder who played briefly in the All-American Girls Professional Baseball League (AAGPBL). She batted and threw right-handed.

Smith was born and grew up in Richmond, Virginia. An all-around athlete in college, both in basketball and softball, she served in the Army during World War II, just after the December 7, 1941 attack on Pearl Harbor. Smith joined the Women's Army Auxiliary Corps, where she drew illustrations for the WAAC newspaper based at Fort Oglethorpe in Georgia, and also played as a catcher on a women's fast-pitch softball team. She was transferred to the Pentagon in 1944 to work in Army Military Intelligence, working in cartography. She was discharged in 1945 and made her debut in the AAGPBL in its 1947 season, playing for the Kenosha Comets before joining the Grand Rapids Chicks in 1948.

Following her baseball career, Smith attended and graduated from Pratt Art Institute in New York City. She spent more than 30 years in the Richmond school system, teaching art and shop classes, before retiring in 1982. The AAGPBL folded in 1954, but there is now a permanent display at the Baseball Hall of Fame and Museum at Cooperstown, New York since November 5, 1988 that honors those who were part of this experience. Smith, along with the rest of the league's girls, is enshrined in the Hall. Smith died in January 2019 in her hometown of Richmond, Virginia, 12 days after her 97th birthday.

== Sources ==
- Encyclopedia of women and baseball - Leslie A. Heaphy, Mel Anthony May. Publisher: McFarland and Company, 2006. Format: Paperback, 438pp. Language: English. ISBN 0-7864-2100-2
- The Women of the All-American Girls Professional Baseball League: A Biographical Dictionary - W. C. Madden. Publisher: McFarland and Company, 2005. Format: Paperback, 295 pp. Language: English. ISBN 0-7864-3747-2
