= Rose Folder =

All-American Girls Professional Baseball League player

- Infielder / Outfielder / Pitcher
- Born: May 12, 1926; Springfield, Illinois, U.S.
- Died: July 3, 2014 (aged 88); Carnation, Washington, U.S.
- Batted: Right Threw: Right

Teams
- Kenosha Comets (1944)

Career highlights and awards
- Postseason appearance (1944); Women in Baseball – AAGPBL Permanent Display at Baseball Hall of Fame and Museum (1988)

Rose "Rosie" Folder (later Powell; May 12, 1926 – July 3, 2014) was an outfield/infield utility and pitcher who played in the All-American Girls Professional Baseball League (AAGPBL) in the 1944 season. Listed at 5 ft 6 in (1.68 m), 140 lb, she batted and threw right-handed.

Folder was a very dependable player during her only year in the league. ״Rosie״, as she was nicknamed, was able to play at shortstop, third base, right field, and also volunteered to pitch when her team suffered a shortage of hurlers. In addition, she displayed some power and consistently hit line drives.

Born in Springfield, Illinois, Folder attended the now extinct Feitshans High School, where a Lutheran pastor taught her everything she had to know about baseball. He was really interested in putting a team together, and showed her how to pitch. Then she played for a fastpitch softball team.

In 1943, Folder took a part-time job in a spark plugs factory in Chicago during the day, and played semi-professional softball for the Tungsten Sparks team at night. An AAGPBL scout spotted Folder while playing for the Sparks and invited her for a tryout. At the end of her senior year in high school, she took her exams early to attend the 1944 spring training camp at Peru, Illinois.

Folder was allocated to the Kenosha Comets, a team managed by former big leaguer Marty McManus. We learned to play baseball from former major leaguers and were turned from tomboys to ladies by the charm school classes, she explained in interview.

In 1944, she posted a pitching record of 2–7 with a 5.67 earned run average in 14 games, but she was even better as a hitter. Her .261 batting average was the seventh-best in the league, a pretty good performance considering it was a dominant pitching league and no batters surpassed .300 on the year.

Kenosha won the first half of the season and faced the second-half winning Milwaukee Chicks in the 1944 Scholarship Series. The series went to the limit of seven games and Milwaukee clinched the championship, four to three. During the postseason, Folder tried to make a shoestring catch at left field and sprained an ankle, which limited her playing time to one game. She went hitless in one at-bat.

Folder returned home, married Edward Powell in 1946, and raised four girls and two boys. The couple had ten grandchildren and nine great-grandchildren. Besides this, she attended Illinois State Normal University in Normal, and also ran a daycare business in Carnation, Washington, for 25 years.

She is part of Women in Baseball, a permanent display based at the Baseball Hall of Fame and Museum in Cooperstown, New York, which was unveiled in 1988 to honor the entire All-American Girls Professional Baseball League. Though she did not attend the ceremony, she traveled to Cooperstown to see her name in the hall. "That was the biggest thrill of my life", she said of the event.

Rose Folder Powell died on July 3, 2014, in Carnation, Washington, aged 88.

== Career statistics ==
Batting

GP	AB	R	H	2B	3B	HR	RBI	SB	TB	BB	SO	BA	OBP	SLG
71	207	23	54	1	3	1	24	7	64	13	6	.261	.305	.309

Pitching

GP	W	L	W-L%	ERA	IP	H	RA	ER	BB	SO	HBP	WP	WHIP
14	2	7	.222	5.67	73	75	67	46	49	15	0	7	1.70
