= Mildred Earp =

- Pitcher
- Born: October 7, 1925; West Fork, Arkansas, U.S.
- Died: June 27, 2017 (aged 91); Arkansas, U.S.
- Batted: Right Threw: Right

Career statistics
- Games pitched: 218
- Win–loss record: 54–38
- Winning percentage: .587
- Earned run average: 3.16
- Stats at Baseball Reference

Teams
- Grand Rapids Chicks (1947–1950)

Career highlights and awards
- All-Star Team (1947); Championship Team (1947); Four playoffs appearances (1947-'50); Single-season leader in ERA (1947); Pitched a no hitter game (1948); Ranks second all-time for best career ERA best single-season ERA

Mildred Kathryn Earp (October 7, 1925 – June 27, 2017), nicknamed Mid or Millie, was an American baseball pitcher who played from 1947 to 1950 in the All-American Girls Professional Baseball League (AAGPBL). Listed at 5 ft 6 in (1.68 m), 135 lb, she batted and threw right-handed.

Earp was a pitcher for the Grand Rapids Chicks in a span of four years. One of the first successful underhand pitchers in the league, Earp was selected to the All-Star Team in her rookie season, recorded the second best single-season ERA and the second best career ERA in AAGPBL history, and helped Grand Rapids win their first Championship Title. She also hurled a no-hitter game and ranked between the top 10 in several pitching categories during her short stint in the league.

She is part of the AAGPBL permanent display at the Baseball Hall of Fame and Museum at Cooperstown, New York, opened in 1988, which is dedicated to the entire league rather than any individual player.

== Career ==
=== 1940s ===
By 1943 a new All-American Girls Softball League was formed, playing a hybrid form of softball and baseball. The league, which started when World War II made the suspension of Major League Baseball a possibility, would eventually shift gears to become the All-American Girls Professional Baseball League, and was dissolved at the end of the 1954 season.

A native of West Fork, Arkansas, Earp started to play softball in a fourth grade league. She first heard about the AAGPBL when it came to play an exhibition game 50 miles away from her homeland. She contacted a league official and told him her desire to play in the circuit. By then the AAGPBL was preparing the transition from underhand to sidearm pitching. Earp was assigned to the Racine Belles in 1946 and tried out as a sidearm pitcher. Since she did not know anything about the baseball game, she spent the entire season sitting on the dugout and was paid to learn the fundamentals of the game. Prior to the next season she was allocated to the Grand Rapids Chicks.

In 1947, according to a new regulation, all AAGPBL pitchers were forced to switch from underhand to sidearm. Such change adversely affected the performance of underhand pitchers, but it did not disturb Earp, because she had developed a blazing fastball and a dropping curveball, showing a good command of her pitches. Earp posted a 20–8 record for a .714 winning percentage in 35 pitching appearances in her first season, collecting a record 0.68 ERA and striking out 192 while walking 32 in 280 innings of work. Her 0.68 ERA was a new single-season record, although Lois Florreich would set a 0.67 ERA in 1949 to reach the all-time mark. Earp, who led a pitching staff that included Alice Haylett (19–11) and Connie Wisniewski (16–14), finished second in strikeouts to Fort Wayne's Dorothy Collins (244), second in winning percentage to Muskegon's Doris Sams (.733), and made her first and only All-Star Team. With Johnny Rawlings at the helm, Grand Rapids finished in second place with a 65–47 record, dispatched South Bend in the first round of the playoffs, and defeated Racine in the final series, four to three games, to clinch the AAGPBL Championship Title. Even though she lost Game 1, 2–0, in 11 innings after retiring the first 21 Belles batters, she rebounded to win Game 4 on a 3–0 shutout, and then pitched a four-hit, 1–0 shutout to win decisive Game 7. In five postseason decisions, Earp went 1–1 with a 1.13 ERA against South Bend, and 2–1, 0.62 against Racine.

In 1948 Earp made a new transition from sidearm to overhand pitching. She obtained mixed results, after going 15–14 (.517) with a 1.31 ERA and 166 strikeouts, while ranking sixth in ERA and seventh in strikeouts. She also recorded a no-hitter against the Chicago Colleens early in the season. At this point, Grand Rapids won the Eastern Division with a 77–47 mark and advanced to the playoffs. In the first round the Chicks defeated South Bend, three to two games, but were swept in the second round by Fort Wayne in three contests. Earp earned two of the three wins in the first round, including a one-hit shutout, but allowed six runs in six innings in decisive Game 3 of the second round. Earp produced almost identical numbers in 1949, when she went 14–10 (.583) with 143 strikeouts and a 1.83 ERA. Grand Rapids finished third with a 57–54 record and qualified for the postseason. She was the winner in decisive Game 3 of the first round, knocking out her nemesis Fort Wayne, but lost her only start in the semifinals to the eventual champion Rockford Peaches, who defeated South Bend in four games.

=== 1950s ===
The AAGPBL used a livelier ball in 1950. As a result, offensive levels augmented significantly in all cases with more hits, scoring more runs and hitting four times as many home runs as they did in previous seasons. That year Earp dropped to 5–6 with a 1.35 ERA, while the Chicks were 59–53 and ended fourth. Grand Rapids lost to Fort Wayne in the first round of the playoffs, three games to one. Earp was 0–1 with a 6.25 ERA in one playoff appearance. In a four-season career, Earp posted a 58–38 record with a 1.35 ERA in 108 games, and went 7–5 with a 1.95 ERA in the postseason. She ranks second all-time for best career ERA (0.12 behind Jean Faut) and best single-season ERA (0.01 behind Lois Florreich).

== Personal life ==
Earp was born in October 1925 in West Fork, Arkansas to Joseph McKnight and Ona Earp. She married Ray Jackson Collins at the age of 16. Following her baseball career, Earp returned to her homeland of West Fork, Arkansas, where she died on June 27 2017.
