= Series (baseball) =

Consecutive games played by the same teams

In baseball, a series refers to two or more consecutive games played between the same two teams. Historically and currently, professional baseball season revolves around a schedule of series, each typically lasting three or four games. In college baseball, there are typically midweek single games and weekend series, with all conference games in series of three games, with the second and fourth rounds of the NCAA Division I playoffs being best two out of three game series. These series are often geographically grouped, allowing teams to visit adjacent cities conveniently. This is known in baseball as a road trip, and a team can be on the road for up to 20 games, or 4-5 series.

When a team hosts series at home (mainly two-four consecutive series), it is called a homestand. During the Major League Baseball Postseason, there are four wild card series (two in each League), each of which are a best-of-3 series. The remainder of the Postseason consists of the League Division Series, which is a best-of-5 series, and the League Championship Series, which is a best-of-7 series, followed by the World Series, a best-of-7 series to determine the Major League Baseball Champion. The "series" schedule gives its name to the MLB championship series, the World Series. The record for the longest series was set in 1904, when the St. Louis Browns played the Detroit Tigers for 11 consecutive games.
