= Lee Surkowski =

Canadian baseball player

- Center fielder
- Born: October 26, 1925; Moose Jaw, Saskatchewan, Canada
- Died: March 30, 2012 (aged 86); California, U.S.
- Batted: Right Threw: Right

Teams
- South Bend Blue Sox (1944–1946); Rockford Peaches (1946); Fort Wayne Daisies (1948)

Career highlights and awards
- Led all center fielders in fielding average and double plays (1944); Two postseason appearances (1946, 1948); Canadian Baseball Hall of Fame honorary induction (1998); Saskatchewan Baseball Hall of Fame honorary induction (1998); Women in Baseball – AAGPBL Permanent Display at Baseball Hall of Fame and Museum (1988)

Lee Surkowski (October 26, 1925 – March 30, 2012) was a Canadian center fielder who played in the All-American Girls Professional Baseball League (AAGPBL) in parts of four seasons spanning 1945–1948. Listed at 5' 5", 128 lb., Surkowski batted and threw right handed. She also played under the name of Lee Delmonico.

Born in Moose Jaw, Saskatchewan, Lee Surkowski was one of the 68 players born in Canada to join the All-American Girls Professional Baseball League in its twelve years history. An AAGPBL talent scout spotted Surkowski while playing softball in Canada and offered her a contract to play in the league without a previous tryout.

Surkowski entered the league in 1944 with the South Bend Blue Sox, playing for them two and a half years before joining the Rockford Peaches during the 1946 midseason. Her older sister, Anne, also played in the league.

Surkowski was the everyday center fielder for South Bend in her rookie season. Over 97 games, she batted a .212 average with a .288 on-base percentage and a .284 of slugging, while driving in 29 runs and scoring 32 times. She also tied for third in home runs (3) and for eighth in doubles (7), a pretty good performance considering it was a dominant pitching league.

On defense, she committed only five errors in 159 fielding chances to lead all center fielders with a .969 fielding average. She also tied with Racine Belles' Claire Schillace for the most double plays (4) at center field. During the regular season, she belted two homers against Kenosha Comets' Elise Harney in the same game. In an interview, Surkowski stated that it was her greatest achievement in a single game.

In 1945, Surkowski posted a slash line (BA/OBP/SLG) of .209/.268/.264 with 42 runs and 34 RBI in 106 games, and finished ninth in triples (4) while tying for eighth in doubles (8). In 1946 she hit a combined .200 average for South Bend and Rockford in 82 games, helping the Peaches reach the postseason.

Surkowski did not play in 1947 due to family reasons, but returned the next year with the Fort Wayne Daisies for her last season. She played all outfield positions, batting .186 in just 63 games, and returned for the postseason.

She married Alphonso Delmonico, which limited her play on the field. She then moved in 1957 to California, where she raised three children: Barry, Randy and Teri Lee. Lee became a US citizen in 1970.

A longtime resident of Rancho Mirage in California, she has been honored with many recognitions and awards over the years. In 1998, she garnered honorary inductions in the Canadian Baseball Hall of Fame and the Saskatchewan Baseball Hall of Fame. She is also part of Women in Baseball, a permanent display based at the Baseball Hall of Fame and Museum in Cooperstown, New York, which was unveiled in 1988 to honor the entire All-American Girls Professional Baseball League. She died in 2012.

== Career statistics ==
Batting

GP	AB	R	H	2B	3B	HR	RBI	SB	TB	BB	SO	BA	OBP	SLG
351	1166	128	237	21	16	5	85	98	305	108	93	.203	.286	.262

Fielding

GP	PO	A	E	TC	DP	FA
339	505	44	30	579	9	.948
