= Barbara Gates =

American baseball player

- Pitcher
- Born: May 4, 1934; Chicago, Illinois, U.S.
- Died: December 1, 2000 (aged 66); Naperville, Illinois, U.S.
- Batted: Right Threw: Right

Teams
- South Bend Blue Sox (1953); Grand Rapids Chicks (1953); Fort Wayne Daisies (1954)

Career highlights and awards
- AAGPBL Championship Title (1954); Women in Baseball – AAGPBL Permanent Display at the Baseball Hall of Fame and Museum (unveiled in 1988)

Barbara Gates (May 4, 1934 – December 1, 2000) was a right handed pitcher who played from 1953 to 1954 in the All-American Girls Professional Baseball League (AAGPBL).

Born in Chicago, Illinois, Barbara Gates pitched the last two seasons of the league with three different teams, including the 1954 pennant-winning Fort Wayne Daisies. In 1953, she divided her playing time between the South Bend Blue Sox and the Grand Rapids Chicks.

In 19 pitching appearances, Gates posted a 1–4 record with a 7.42 ERA, allowing 62 runs – 47 earned – on 53 hits and 69 walks, while striking out 20 in 57 innings. As a hitter, she went 2-for-19 for a .105 average.

She died in 2000 in Naperville, Illinois, at the age of 66.

In 1988 was inaugurated a permanent display at the Baseball Hall of Fame and Museum at Cooperstown, New York, that honors those who were part of the All-American Girls Professional Baseball League. Barbara Gates, along with the rest of the girls and the league staff, is included at the display/exhibit.
