= Joyce Messenger =

American baseball player

- Utility player
- Born: August 7, 1931; Lansing, Michigan, U.S.
- Died: September 14, 2015 (aged 84)
- Batted: Right Threw: Right

Teams
- Grand Rapids Chicks (1953)

Joyce Ann Messenger (August 7, 1931 – September 14, 2015) was an infielder who played in the All-American Girls Professional Baseball League (AAGPBL).

According to All-American League data, Messenger played for the Grand Rapids Chicks club during its 1953 season. Additional information is incomplete because there are no records available at the time of the request.
