= Shirley Palesh =

American baseball player

- Right Field
- Born: November 23, 1929; Chicago, Illinois, U.S.
- Died: March 1, 2017 (aged 87); Wausau, Wisconsin, U.S.
- Batted: Right Threw: Right

Teams
- Racine Belles (1949); Grand Rapids Chicks (1950); Rockford Peaches (1950)

Shirley Palesh (November 23, 1929 – March 1, 2017) was an American baseball player in the All-American Girls Professional Baseball League between 1949 and 1950. She both batted and threw right-handed. She earned herself two nicknames while playing for the league: Shirl and Butch.

== Pre-baseball career ==
Before Shirley joined the league, she played softball. She played locally in the position of pitcher, outfielder and leading hitter. It was her strength in these positions for the local team, that helped them win in the Wisconsin regionals. She came from a family of sports lovers, with her brother and father being active baseball players, helping her hone her skills from a young age.

== Professional baseball ==
Shirley played for three teams during her short time with the AAGPBL. She played for the: Racine Belles (in 1949) Grand Rapids Chicks (in 1950), and the Rockford Peaches (in 1950). While playing for the Belles, in spring training, Shirley was in the outfield as it was believed she would make a "solid all-around player."

== Career statistics ==
Year	G	AB	R	H	2B	3B	HR	RBI	SB	BB	SO	AVG
1949	8	31	-	1	-	-	-	-	-	-	-	.077
1950	10	25	0	1	0	0	0	2	0	1	4	.040
