= Yolande Teillet =

- Born: September 28, 1927; St. Vital, Winnipeg, Canada
- Died: January 26, 2006 (aged 77); Winnipeg, Manitoba, Canada
- Other names: Yolande Schick
- Parent(s): Sara Riel and Camille Teillet
- Relatives: Roger Teillet (brother)
- Baseball career
- Catcher
- Bats: Right Throws: Right

Teams
- Fort Wayne Daisies (1945); Grand Rapids Chicks (1946); Kenosha Comets (1947)

Yolande Schick (née Teillet; September 28, 1927 - January 26, 2006), nicknamed Yo Yo, was a Métis-Canadian catcher who played for the All-American Girls Professional Baseball League (AAGPBL). She both batted and threw right-handed.

== Personal life ==
The daughter of Camille Teillet and Sara Riel, Yolande Teillet was the granddaughter of Joseph Riel, younger brother of Louis Riel. One of her brothers was Member of Parliament Roger Teillet.

She was one of the first Métis players to ever play in the United States.

She had 9 children and 21 grandchildren at the time of her death in 2006.

== Baseball career ==
She started off by playing for the St. Vital Tigerettes in the position of catcher in the early 1940s, where she was scouted to play in the All-American Girls Professional Baseball League. She was soon after recruited to play for the Fort Wayne Daisies as an inaugural member of the team (in 1945), who came in second place that year to the Rockford Peaches. She also played for the Grand Rapids Chicks (in 1946), as well as the Kenosha Comets (in 1947), before returning home to play for the Tigerettes once again. Yolande was inducted as one of eleven female athletes from Manitoba who played in the All-American Girls league, into the National Baseball Hall of Fame in 1988, and Into the Canadian Baseball Hall of Fame and the Manitoba Baseball Hall of Fame in 1998.

== Batting record ==
Year	G	AB	R	H	2B	3B	HR	RBI	SB	BB	SO	AVG
1945	10	13	2	3	0	0	0	3	0	2	2	.231
1946	5	6	-	1	-	-	-	-	-	-	-	.167
1947	2	3	-	1	-	-	-	-	-	-	-	.333
