= Anne Surkowski =

Canadian baseball player (1923–2020)

- Outfield
- Born: July 22, 1923; Moose Jaw, Saskatchewan, Canada
- Died: 2020 (aged 96–97)
- Batted: Right Threw: Right

Teams
- South Bend Blue Sox (1945)

Career highlights and awards
- Canadian Baseball Hall of Fame induction (1998)

Anne Deyotte (née Surkowski, February 22, 1923 – 2020) was a Canadian outfielder who played in the All-American Girls Professional Baseball League (AAGPBL). Listed at 5' 3", 120 lb., she batted and threw right-handed.

Born in Moose Jaw, Saskatchewan, she was one of the 68 players born in Canada to join the All-American Girls Professional Baseball League in its twelve years history.

Surkowski joined her younger sister Lee on the South Bend Blue Sox team for the 1945 season. She served as a backup outfielder for Lee at center field, Rose Gacioch at left, and Betsy Jochum in right.

Like her sister, Surkowski has been honored with many recognitions and awards over the years. In 1998, she garnered honorary inductions in the Canadian Baseball Hall of Fame and the Saskatchewan Baseball Hall of Fame. She is also part of Women in Baseball, a permanent display based at the Baseball Hall of Fame and Museum in Cooperstown, New York, which was unveiled in 1988 to honor the entire All-American Girls Professional Baseball League.

Surkowski died in 2020.

== Career statistics ==
Batting

GP	AB	R	H	2B	3B	HR	RBI	SB	BB	SO	BA	OBP
21	39	5	4	0	0	0	1	4	3	7	.103	.167

Fielding

GP	PO	A	E	TC	DP	FA
18	11	2	3	16	1	.867
