= Ruth Lessing =

- Catcher
- Born: August 15, 1925; San Antonio, Texas, U.S.
- Died: October 26, 2000 (aged 75); San Antonio, Texas, U.S.
- Batted: Right Threw: Right

debut
- 1944

Last appearance
- 1949

Teams
- Minneapolis Millerettes (1944); Fort Wayne Daisies (1945); Grand Rapids Chicks (1946–'49)

Career highlights and awards
- Three-time All-Star Team (1946-'48); ChampionshipTeam (1947); Set single-season record in fielding average (1945) for most assists (1946) in games caught (1948); Four playoff appearances (1945-'48); Texas Baseball Hall of Fame Induction (2006)

Ruth Elizabeth "Tex" Lessing (August 15, 1925 – October 26, 2000) was an American female catcher who played from 1944 through 1949 in the All-American Girls Professional Baseball League (AAGPBL). Listed at 5 ft 5 in (1.65 m), 128 lb., she batted and threw right-handed.

Ruth Lessing has been considered as one of the best defensive catchers in All-American Girls Professional Baseball League history. Respected for her solid skills behind home plate, including a strong and accurate arm, Lessing also was renowned for her fiery and competitive spirit. She played over 100 games during four straight seasons, was selected to the All-Star Team three consecutive years, and set several all-time, single-season records before suffering a career-ending shoulder injury that forced her to retire prematurely.

A native of San Antonio, Texas, Lessing was a standout athlete at Jefferson High School. She was spotted in the early 1940s by a scout from the All-American Girls Professional Baseball League. She graduated in 1944 and immediately joined the Minneapolis Millerettes, an expansion AAGPBL team managed by former big leaguer Bubber Jonnard. In her rookie season Lessing shared catching duties with Pepper Paire.

In 1944, Lessing hit a .177 batting average in 57 games for Minneapolis, scoring 13 runs while driving in 27 more. She posted a single-season, career-high with 22 stolen bases, and ten of her 35 hits were doubles. Playing their home games at Nicollet Park, the Millerettes could not compete with the local Minneapolis Millers. In addition, Minneapolis was far from the other five cities in the league, forcing the Millerettes to spend most of the season on the road. As a result, the team finished last in both halves of the season with a compiled 45–72 record, being replaced in 1945 by the Fort Wayne Daisies.

Lessing became a regular with Fort Wayne in 1945, appearing in 110 games and setting an all-time single season record for a catcher with a .982 fielding average. She also hit .123 with 32 runs and 21 RBI, while the Daisies, with Bill Wambsganss at the helm, had a strong season debut, going 62–47 and finishing four and a half games behind first-place Rockford Peaches. During the playoffs, Fort Wayne disposed of the Racine Belles in the first round, three to one games, but struggled to Rockford in the final round, four-to-one.

In 1946, Lessing joined the Grand Rapids Chicks, playing for them for the rest of her career. In her first year with the team, she led all catchers with 141 assists, which also is an all-time record. Besides this, Lessing improved her offensive numbers with a .215 average, 43 runs and 35 RBI, and was selected to the All-Star Team. Managed by Johnny Rawlings, Grand Rapids finished 71–41 and advanced to the playoffs, only to be beaten by Rockford in the first round, three-to-two.

Lessing became one of two hundred players to attend the first AAGPBL spring training outside the United States, which was held in 1947 in Cuba at the Gran Stadium de La Habana. With deliveries changing from underhand (or, underarm; compare pitching in softball) to sidearm in that season, the work of Lessing behind the plate was an instrumental part of the success for the pitching staff. She caught splendidly, giving her pitchers confidence and stability by calling the game and instigating defensive plays on the field. Lessing also contributed with her bat, hitting .205 with 24 runs and 42 RBI in 111 games, while earning a second selection to the All-Star Team. The Chicks went 65–47 and made the playoffs for the second consecutive year. In the first round, the team defeated the South Bend Blue Sox in five games, and won the Championship Title behind Mildred Earp, who pitched a 1–0 shutout against the Belles in decisive Game 7.

In 1948, Lessing set another all-time record, appearing in 125 games behind the plate in the regular season. She also posted career-numbers in hits (86), runs (43) and RBI (36), while hitting a .206 average and making her third and last All-Star Team, helping the Chicks win the Eastern Section with a 77–47 record. In the postseason, Grand Rapids defeated South Bend in five games but was swept by Fort Wayne in three games during the second round. After playing 44 games in the 1949 season, Lessing suffered a career-ending shoulder injury. At the time, she was hitting .233 (28-for-120) with nine runs and nine RBI.

Once her playing days were gone, Lessing returned to San Antonio, where she took a job at the Kelly Air Force Base. In 1991, she served as a technical adviser for filmmaker Penny Marshall during the shooting of her film A League of Their Own, which brought many of the real players began to earn a rebirth of celebrity with the first season of the All-American Girls Professional Baseball League. Lessing, like many AAGPBL players, were relatively unknown until the Marshall's film was exhibited for the first time. After that, the AAGPBL Players Association reunions became formal annual events in 1998.

Ruth Lessing died of cancer in her homeland of San Antonio at the age of 75. In 2006, she was awarded a posthumous induction into the Texas Baseball Hall of Fame. She is part of the AAGPBL permanent display at the Baseball Hall of Fame and Museum at Cooperstown, New York, opened in 1988, which is dedicated to the entire league rather than any individual player.

== Career statistics ==
Batting

GP	AB	R	H	2B	3B	HR	RBI	TB	SB	BB	SO	BA	OBP	SLG
559	1840	164	351	31	8	2	161	404	98	178	187	.191	.220	.482

Fielding

PO	A	E	TC	DP	FA
2597	219	87	2903	56	.973
