= Charlotte Armstrong (baseball) =

American baseball player

- Pitcher
- Born: June 17, 1924; Dallas, Texas, U.S.
- Died: November 24, 2008 (aged 84); Phoenix, Arizona, U.S.
- Batted: Right Threw: Right

Career statistics
- Win–loss record: 39–37
- Earned run average: 1.74
- Games pitched: 87

Teams
- South Bend Blue Sox (1944–1945)

Charlotte T. Armstrong (née Lubman; June 17, 1924 – November 24, 2008) was a pitcher who played from 1944 through 1945 in the All-American Girls Professional Baseball League (AAGPBL). Listed at 5 ft 7 in (1.70 m), 145 lb., Armstrong batted and threw right-handed. She was affectionately nicknamed Skipper.

A hard fastball pitcher, Armstrong was one of the top starters in the AAGPBL for two years before jumping to a rival professional league.

== Early life ==
A native of Dallas, Texas, Armstrong was one of two girls in the family of Wilhelm Lubman and Gladyse (née: Nicholson) Lubman. Armstrong grew up in Phoenix, playing sandlot ball with the boys of her neighborhood when she was a little girl. "They stuck me in the outfield, so l had to learn to throw", she recalled. As a youngster, she was befriended by local big leaguer Hank Leiber, who taught her to pitch.

== AAGPBL career ==
During spring training in early years, the AAGPBL allocated the players to teams for the purpose of maintaining a competitive balance. Assigned to the South Bend Blue Sox, Armstrong became known as one of the league's best overhand pitchers. She immediately formed part of a strong pitching staff that included Margaret Berger and Doris Barr.

In 1944, Armstrong posted a 21–15 record with a 1.51 earned run average, and the following season she went 18–22 with a 1.96 ERA. She later played for the Chicago Bluebirds of the National Girls' Baseball League, before returning to Phoenix, where she attended art studies at Phoenix College and played softball again for the Queens as a member of their national championship teams.

Charlotte Armstrong died in Phoenix, Arizona at the age of 84.
