= Thelma Childress =

American baseball player (1926–2019)

- Born: October 9, 1926; Richmond, Virginia, U.S.
- Died: October 18, 2019 (aged 93); Virginia, U.S.

Teams
- Grand Rapids Chicks (1946)

Career highlights and awards
- Women in Baseball – AAGPBL Permanent Display at Baseball Hall of Fame and Museum (1988)

Thelma Childress (later Pedin and then Kinney, October 9, 1926 – October 18, 2019) was an All-American Girls Professional Baseball League player. She was born in Richmond, Virginia. Childress appeared as a member of the Grand Rapids Chicks club during its 1946 season.

The AAGPBL folded in 1954, but there is a permanent display at the Baseball Hall of Fame and Museum at Cooperstown, New York, since November 5, 1988, that honors the entire league rather than any individual figure.

Kinney survived her son, J.S. Scot Pedin, who died in March 2019 at the age of 63. She died in October 2019, shortly before her 94th birthday.
