= Marilyn Jenkins =

American baseball player (1934–2020)

- Catcher
- Born: September 18, 1934; Grand Rapids, Michigan, U.S.
- Died: February 7, 2020 (aged 85)
- Batted: Right Threw: Right

Teams
- Grand Rapids Chicks (1952–1954)

Career highlights and awards
- Championship team (1953); Women in Baseball – AAGPBL Permanent Display at Baseball Hall of Fame and Museum (1988)

Marilyn A. Jenkins (September 18, 1934 – February 7, 2020) was a catcher who played in the All-American Girls Professional Baseball League (AAGPBL). Listed at 5 ft 6 in (1.68 m), 140 lb., she batted and threw right-handed.

The All-American Girls Professional Baseball League, created by Chicago Cubs' owner Philip K. Wrigley in anticipation of losing male players to the World War II draft, gave a new name to the baseball game. Since its 1943 season opener, the circuit developed a select group of women that changed the ballgame forever between the 1940s and 1950s.

Born in Grand Rapids, Michigan, Marilyn Jenkins played for her hometown team Grand Rapids Chicks during the last three seasons of the league.

Jenkins was a modest but dedicated ballplayer who earned the responsibility of learning the game correctly at a very early age. She started a long time relationship of ten years with the Chicks when she was 10 years old, and stayed with them until the league folded after the 1954 season.

Marilyn was in grade school when she sneaked out of class to serve as a bat girl for her home team. When she was 13, the team allowed her to practice with them on the field. She always used to arrive very early to the ballpark and quickly learned to catch a ball during batting practice. When her father died in 1947 the Chicks provided a strong support for her and her mother. Then, when the team won the champion title in that season she felt comforted and happy again. Four years later, she turned 17 and was ready to start playing with the team. I learned a lot and idolized them, of course, she explained in an interview.

Jenkins opened 1952 with the Chicks, serving as a third-string catcher behind Lavonne Paire and Mamie Redman. She hit a .133 batting average in just 18 games. In her second year, she shared duties with Redman after Paire's departure to the Racine Belles. Jenkins improved her average up to .207 in 69 games, while committing only eight errors in 292 fielding chances for a .972 mark.

In the 1954 season the league adopted new rules of play, making the game much like Major League Baseball. The ball was reduced from 10 inches to 9 inches, while the pitching distance increased from 56 to 60 feet. In her first at-bat of the season, Jenkins smashed the new ball over the fence for the only home run of her career, which was cut short about halfway through the season due to health issues.

A .192 career hitter, Jenkins also played in seven postseason games and was a member of the 1953 champion team, to achieve her childhood dreams of playing baseball for her hometown Chicks. A sure handed catcher, she received in 113 games and posted a fielding average of .960 (17 errors in 426 chances). She earned an additional distinction for being the only Grand Rapids native playing on the team.

After baseball, Jenkins fulfilled a wide variety of jobs. She entered the healthcare field as a radiologic technologist, and years later offered paralegal services until 1980, then started an estate sales business that she attended for the next two decades. In her spare time she became an avid golfer.

Since 1988 she is part of Women in Baseball, a permanent display based at the Baseball Hall of Fame and Museum in Cooperstown, New York, which was unveiled to honor the entire All-American Girls Professional Baseball League. The ceremony received even more attention when the Penny Marshall's film A League of Their Own, starring Tom Hanks, Geena Davis, Madonna and Rosie O'Donnell, was released in 1992. To be cast in the film, actresses could not just look the part; they had to have the baseball skills too, according to Marshall.

In 2010, Jenkins was among other 50 AAGPBL former players honored at Comerica Park before a Detroit Tigers' game against the Chicago White Sox. Jenkins and her AAGPBL pals also had a lunch cruise aboard the Detroit Princess Riverboat, in addition to a banquet and players meeting. It was a heck of a lot of fun, she said. At the time, none of us really thought we were doing something out of the ordinary. We just loved to play baseball.

Marilyn Jenkins resided in her home town of Grand Rapids until her death on February 7, 2020.

== Career statistics ==
Batting

GP	AB	R	H	2B	3B	HR	RBI	SB	TB	BB	SO	BA	OBP	SLG
141	365	38	70	8	2	1	33	11	85	50	43	.192	.289	.233

Fielding

GP	PO	A	E	TC	DP	FA
113	346	63	17	426	11	..960
