= Vickie Panos =

Canadian baseball player

- Outfielder
- Born: March 20, 1920; Moose Jaw, Saskatchewan, Canada
- Died: April 29, 1986 (aged 66); Brisbane, Australia
- Batted: Left Threw: Left

Career statistics
- Batting average: .263
- Stolen bases: 141
- On-base percentage: .367

Teams
- South Bend Blue Sox (1944); Milwaukee Chicks (1944)

Career highlights and awards
- AAGPBL champion (1944)

Victoria Panos (March 20, 1920 – April 29, 1986) was a Canadian baseball player who played as an outfielder for two different teams in the All-American Girls Professional Baseball League (AAGPBL). Listed at 5' 3", 120 lb., Panos batted left-handed and threw left-handed. Sometimes she is credited as Vicky Pano.

== Career ==
A native of Moose Jaw, Saskatchewan, Canada born to Greek-Canadian parents, Panos was one of three descendants of Greek migrants to play in the All-American Girls Professional Baseball League, the others being Annastasia Batikis and Kay Lionikas.

Panos entered the AAGPBL in 1944 with the South Bend Blue Sox, playing for them in part of the season before joining the eventual league champion Milwaukee Chicks. She excelled as one of the team's top offensive stars, ranking near the top in several offensive categories.

In her only season, Panos scored 84 runs with 141 stolen bases in 115 games, both second-most in the league behind the speedy Sophie Kurys, who scored 87 times and set a league-record with 166 steals. Panos also hit a .263 batting average for sixth place and batted 106 hits for fifth-most in the league, while posting a solid .367 on-base percentage and a .978 fielding average.

In the postseason, Panos hit .214 with five runs and seven stolen bases for the Chicks, who went on to win the AAGPBL title after beating the Kenosha Comets.

== Milestone ==
- The AAGPBL folded in 1954, but there is now a permanent display at the Baseball Hall of Fame and Museum at Cooperstown, New York since November 5, 1988 that honors those who were part of this unique experience. But like many of her AAGPBL colleagues, Vickie Panos was relatively unknown until the 1992 film A League of Their Own by filmmaker Penny Marshall was exhibited for the first time.

== See also ==
- Greek Canadians
