= Merle Keagle =

- Center field
- Born: March 21, 1923; Tolleson, Arizona, U.S.
- Died: December 7, 1950 (aged 25); Tolleson, Arizona, U.S.
- Batted: Right Threw: Right
- Stats at Baseball Reference

Teams
- Milwaukee Chicks (1944); Grand Rapids Chicks (1946, 1948)

Career highlights and awards
- All-Star Team (1948); Championship Team (1944); Single-season leader in home runs (1944) extrabases (1944) total bases (1944) doubles (1946)

Merle Patricia Keagle (March 21, 1923 – December 7, 1950) was an American center fielder who played in the All-American Girls Professional Baseball League between the 1944 and 1948 seasons. Listed at 5' 2", 144 lb., she batted and threw right-handed.

For most of her brief career, Merle Keagle was considered a five-tool player for her offensive and defensive skills. An All-Star and a member of a championship team, Keagle hit for average and moved along runners as an occasional slugger. She also had base stealing speed abilities and excelled on defense in center field. Owner of a strong throwing arm, she had speed and range, being able to catch fly balls from her left and right field teammates, making everything look easy, as she managed to throw from just any position on the field. Eventually, she covered third base and served as an occasional starting pitcher. In addition, Keagle captured a home run title, posted several season records, and averaged more than 100 stolen bases in each of her three seasons in the league. Unfortunately, her promising career was truncated by health and family issues. Besides her talents, she was a favorite of the fanatics due to her field antics and by arguing heatedly with the umpires.

== A brief history ==
The All-American Girls Professional Baseball League operated between 1943 and 1954 and started with four teams: the Racine Belles and the Kenosha Comets, both from Wisconsin; the Rockford Peaches from Illinois, and the South Bend Blue Sox from Indiana. Originally, the game was a combination of baseball and softball. Differences were only in the distances between the bases, the distance from the pitching mound to home plate, the size of the ball, and pitching styles through the 12 years of existence of the circuit.

== Early life ==
A native of Tolleson, Arizona, Merle was the daughter of Walter G. Patterson and Alice Jones Patterson. At an early age, the young girl became accustomed to participate in typical boyish activities, from climbing trees to tossing a frisbee or playing sandlot ball. Merle started to play organized softball at the age of fifteen, and graduated from Tolleson Union High School in 1941. After graduation, she continued playing in an independent league until being discovered by AAGPBL scout Bill Allington 1943. Before long, Merle Patricia Patterson, known as "Pat" to her friends, met and married Richard Keagle. Merle attended a tryout arranged by Allington, who would join the league for the upcoming season as manager of the Rockford team. Keagle passed the test and was rewarded with a contract to play in the league, being assigned to the expansion Milwaukee Chicks.

== AAGPBL career ==
Keagle enjoyed a promising debut with the Chicks. In her first game, she smashed two singles, a double and one home run to drive in all four runs for Milwaukee in a 4–2 victory over Kenosha. The rest of the way she was almost unstoppable, ending with a .264 batting average in 109 games, and pace the league with seven home runs, 145 total bases and 19 extrabases. She also led her team in average, home runs, hits (107), runs scored (72) and RBI (47), while ranking third in the batting crown race behind South Bend's Betsy Jochum (.288) and Racine's Eleanor Dapkus (.269).

In 1945, Keagle did not play for the new Grand Rapids Chicks. She stayed in Arizona to marry her fiancé, Richard, and give birth to their son. But she rejoined the Chicks in 1946 in good form, leading the league outfielders with a .284 average. She also posted a 3–2 record in six pitching appearances, scored 69 runs, had career-numbers in hits (116) and RBI (59), shared the doubles title (15), ranked third in RBI, and made the All-Star Team. Although originally nicknamed Pat by her teammates, she eventually was dubbed the Blonde Bombshell by the Chicks fanatics, becoming one of the most beloved players in the team along with Alice Haylett, Inez Voyce, Connie Wisniewski and Alma Ziegler. Unfortunately, Keagle left the Chicks shortly before the end of the season, because she suffered extreme fatigue and early signs of cancer.

Keagle spent 1947 in Arizona in an attempt to regain her health and return to baseball action. In 1948 she reported to the AAGPBL spring training camp at Opa-locka, Florida, showing her smiling face and carrying an extra 10 pounds. She remained as popular and mischievous as ever and quickly regained her old form. Nevertheless, her offensive production declined during the regular season. She scored a career-high 75 runs, but slipped to a .251 average with 23 extrabases and only 27 RBI over 116 games. With just nine games remaining of the schedule, she tore her left ankle from its socket while sliding at second base. In 1949 she did not return for the Chicks because her fragile health remained a deterrent to the league's demanding schedule.

== Life after baseball ==
Instead, in 1949 Keagle played with the Phoenix A-1 Queens in an Arizona independent league to be close from home. She hit .251 with 23 extrabases over 116 games. Her health declined after that and she had to retire for medical reasons.

In 1951 Keagle was diagnosed with mild cancer. After the initial shock, she followed a rigorous medical treatment that extended her vibrant life for nine years. She died in her homeland of Tolleson at the early age of 37.

Twenty eight years after her death, Merle Keagle became part of the AAGPBL permanent display inaugurated at the Baseball Hall of Fame and Museum at Cooperstown, New York, which is dedicated to the entire league rather than any individual player.

== Career statistics ==
Batting

GP	AB	R	H	2B	3B	HR	RBI	SB	TB	BB	SO	BA	OBP	SLG
337	1238	216	329	33	18	12	133	314	434	153	86	.266	.347	.351

Pitching

GP	W	L	W-L%	ERA	IP	H	RA	ER	BB	SO	WHIP
16	7	5	.583	2.82	102	73	46	32	153	86	1.36

Fielding

GP	PO	A	E	TC	DP	FA
310	498	200	34	732	22	.954
