= Sonny Berger =

American baseball player (1922–2015)

- Pitcher
- Born: December 24, 1922; Homestead, Florida, U.S.
- Died: January 25, 2015 (aged 92); Sun City West, Arizona, U.S.
- Batted: Right Threw: Right

Teams
- South Bend Blue Sox (1943–1944)

Career highlights and awards
- AAGPBL All-Star Team (1943); Women in Baseball – AAGPBL Permanent Display at Baseball Hall of Fame and Museum (since 1988)

Margaret Eloise "Sonny" Berger (December 24, 1922 – January 25, 2015) was a pitcher who played from 1943 through 1944 in the All-American Girls Professional Baseball League (AAGPBL). Listed at 5' 3" (1.60 m), 129 lb. (59 k), Berger batted and threw right-handed. She was nicknamed 'Sonny' by her teammates and close friends.

The AAGPBL changed women's team sports forever. Still, the void the league filled during World War II was inspiration enough for the 1992 film A League of Their Own, directed by Penny Marshall and starred by Geena Davis, Tom Hanks and Madonna.

Born in Homestead, Florida, Sonny Berger was one of the sixty original players of the All-American Girls Professional Baseball League in its inaugural season.

The AAGPBL was introduced in the spring of 1943, featuring young women with both athletic ability and feminine appeal. Hundreds of girls were invited to final tryouts at Wrigley Field in Chicago, Illinois. Of those, sixty were selected as the first women to play on the first four teams: the Kenosha Comets, Racine Belles, Rockford Peaches and South Bend Blue Sox. Each team had fifteen players, a manager, a business manager and a female chaperone. Most AAGPBL games were played at night, including the All-Star game of the inaugural season on July 1, 1943, which also was the first contest played under artificial illumination at Wrigley Field.

Berger was allocated to the South Bend Blue Sox, playing for them two seasons, to become a major star in both years. She posted two straight 20-win seasons, going 25–13 with a 1.91 earned run average in 1943, following with a 21–17 mark in 1944, including a miserly 1.57 ERA. In 1943, she joined Doris Barr to pitch 79 of the 91 games played by the Blue Sox, as Barr was credited with 15 wins. In the same season, Berger stated her greatest triumph, a 13-inning match, which she won 1–0.

Berger compiled a 46–30 record with a 1.75 ERA in 88 career games. She also hit a modest .153 average with 18 runs batted in in 88 games, but only was striking out six times in 222 at-bats.

After that, Berger played for the Chicago Chicks and Thillens Checashers of the National Girls Baseball League.

In 1988, Berger received recognition when the Baseball Hall of Fame and Museum in Cooperstown, New York, dedicated a permanent display to the entire league rather than any individual player.

Sonny Berger was a long resident of Sun City West, Arizona, where she died in 2015 at the age of 92.

== AAGPBL pitching statistics ==
GP	W	L	W-L%	ERA	IP	H	RA	ER	BB	SO	WHIP	SO/BB
88	46	30	.605	1.75	621	395	187	120	134	203	0.85	1.51
