= Josephine Kabick =

- Born: March 27, 1922; Detroit, Michigan, U.S.
- Died: February 8, 1978 (aged 55); Florida, U.S.
- Batted: Right Threw: Right

debut
- 1944, for the Milwaukee Chicks

Last appearance
- 1947, for the Peoria Redwings

Career statistics
- Win–loss record: 74–72
- Earned run average: 2.33
- Strikeouts: 245

Teams
- Milwaukee Chicks (1944); Grand Rapids Chicks (1945–1946); Kenosha Comets (1946); Peoria Redwings (1947)

Career highlights and awards
- AAGPBL wins leader (1944); AAGPBL champion (1944)

Josephine Kabick [Jo] (March 27, 1922 – February 8, 1978) was an American female pitcher who played from 1944 through 1947 in the All-American Girls Professional Baseball League (AAGPBL). Listed at 5 ft 7 in (1.70 m), 142 lb., Kabick batted and threw right-handed. She was born in Detroit, Michigan.

Kabick entered the All-American Girls Professional Baseball League in 1944 with the expansion Milwaukee Chicks, playing for them one year before joining the Grand Rapids Chicks (1945–46), Kenosha Comets (1946) and Peoria Redwings (1947). In her rookie season she posted a 26–19 record with 81 strikeouts in 45 pitching appearances, while leading the league in victories and innings of work (366).

In 1944 the Chicks, managed by Max Carey and supported by Kabick, slugger Merle Keagle, and the speedy Alma Ziegler, finished 30–26 in the first half of the year and dominated the second half (40–19) to collect the best overall record (70–45). She led the league in wins and Innings pitched. The Chicks beat Kenosha in seven games to win the championship.

Although the Chicks captured the AAGPBL championship, they had no local financial backing and could not compete with the American Association Milwaukee Brewers. In fact, the Chicks were forced to play all seven games of the series at Kenosha's Lake Front Stadium because the Brewers were using the Borchert Field in Milwaukee. Due to lack of community support and the vaunted skepticism of journalists, the team moved to Grand Rapids, Michigan, prior to the 1945 season.

But Kabick was unable to repeat her heroics for the 1945 season, while her teammate Connie Wisniewski emerged as one of the most dominant pitchers of the league. After pitching in the two cities, Kabick was dealt to Kenosha during the midseason. She slipped to a combined 16–18 record that year.

In 1946 Kabick improved to 19–19 with Kenosha, a pretty good performance considering her team finished seventh in the eight-team league with a losing record of 42–70, but then she found herself on the move again. This time Kabick went 13–16 for the fifth-place Peoria Redwings (55–57) in 1947, during what turned out to be her last AAGPBL season.

Kabick died in Florida at the age of 55. Ten years after her death she became part of the AAGPBL permanent display at the Baseball Hall of Fame and Museum at Cooperstown, New York, opened in 1988, which is dedicated to the entire league rather than any individual player.

== Pitching statistics ==
GP	W	L	W-L%	ERA	IP	H	RA	ER	BB	SO	WHIP	SO/BB
151	74	72	.507	2.33	1213	948	481	314	403	245	1.14	0.61
