= Catherine Bennett (baseball) =

Canadian baseball player (born 1920)

- Pitcher
- Born: September 4, 1920; Regina, Saskatchewan, Canada
- Bats: Right Throws: Right
- Stats at Baseball Reference

Teams
- Kenosha Comets (1943); South Bend Blue Sox (1943–44)

Catherine Bennett (born September 4, 1920) was a Canadian pitcher who played from 1943 through 1944 in the All-American Girls Professional Baseball League (AAGPBL). Listed at 5' 5", 120 lb., she batted and threw right-handed.

A native of Regina, Saskatchewan Bennett was one of the original players to join the All-American Girls Professional Baseball League for its inaugural season.

The league started in 1943 with four teams: the Kenosha Comets, Racine Belles, Rockford Peaches and South Bend Blue Sox. Each team was made up of fifteen girls. Bennett survived the final cut and was assigned to Kenosha.

In her first season, Bennett divided her playing time between Kenosha and South Bend, recording ten consecutive losses to set a league mark. The next year, she improved to a 14–9 record with the Blue Sox.

The league folded in 1954. It was a neglected chapter of sports history, at least until 1988, when a permanent display was inaugurated at the Baseball Hall of Fame and Museum at Cooperstown, New York, which is dedicated to the entire league rather than any individual figure.

After that, filmmaker Penny Marshall premiered her 1992 film A League of Their Own, a fictional history centered on the first season of the AAGPBL. Starring Geena Davis, Tom Hanks, Madonna, Lori Petty and Rosie O'Donnell, this film brought a rejuvenated interest to the extinct league.

Bennett and 63 other girls who represented Canada in the AAGPBL form part of the aforementioned display at Cooperstown. They also gained induction into the Canadian Baseball Hall of Fame in 1998.
