= Elise Harney =

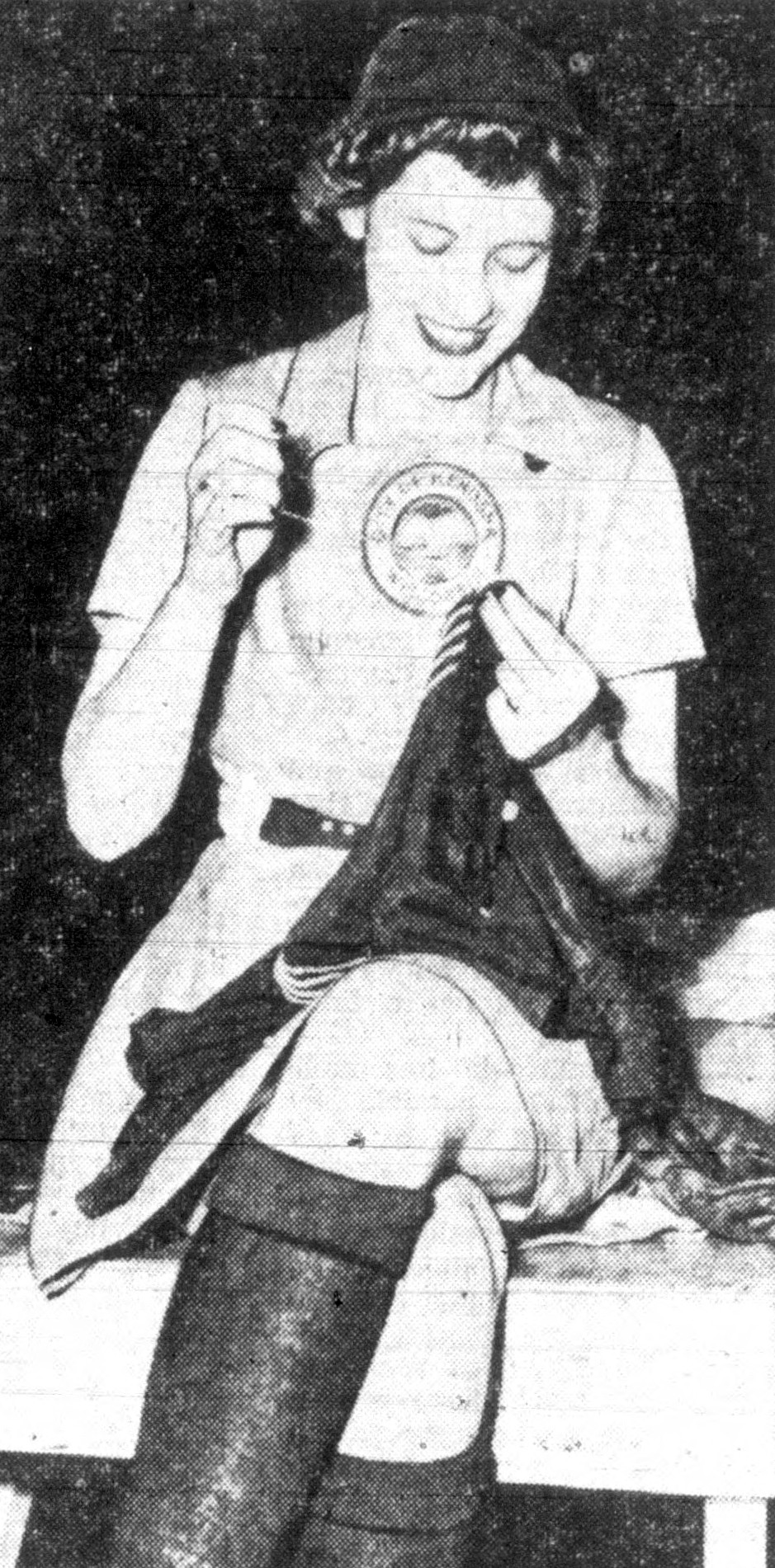
- Harney in 1943
- Pitcher
- Born: July 22, 1924; Franklin County, Illinois, U.S.
- Died: November 1, 1989 (aged 65); Ann Arbor, Michigan, U.S.
- Batted: Right Threw: Right

debut
- 1943

Last appearance
- 1947

Teams
- Kenosha Comets (1943–1946); Fort Wayne Daisies (1946–1947)

Career highlights and awards
- All-Star Game (1943); Two playoff appearances (1943-1944)

Elise "Lee" Harney (July 22, 1924 – November 1, 1989) was a female pitcher who played from 1943 through 1947 in the All-American Girls Professional Baseball League (AAGPBL). She batted and threw right-handed.

A native of Franklin County, Illinois, Elise Harney became one of the sixty founding members of the All-American Girls Professional Baseball League. While at school, she made her mark as a fast-pitch softball hurler in Chicago before joining the league. However, she ended her career prematurely after developing a sore pitching arm while trying to adapt to a new pitching motion in 1947.

In 1943, Harney joined a balanced Kenosha team that included players such as the very talented pitcher Helen Nicol, as well as Ann Harnett, Phyllis Koehn, Shirley Jameson, Pauline Pirok and Audrey Wagner, notably for their hitting abilities and strong defense. Harney relished her debut in the league, ending with a 19–19 record for a .500 percentage, and posted a 2.93 earned run average while striking out 102 batters. Her teammate Nicol led the league in wins (31), ERA (1.81) and strikeouts (220), being honored as Pitcher of the Year. Kenosha collected the third-best record at 56–56, but won the second-half title and earned a ticket to the playoffs. The Comets were swept by Racine in three games during the first (and only) round. Inexplicably, Nicol failed in the playoffs and went 0–2 with a 4.50 ERA. Besides this, Harney also appeared in the league's first All-Star Game during the midseason, which was played under temporary lights at Wrigley Field, between two teams composed of Blue Sox and Peaches players versus Comets and Belles players. It was also the first night game ever played in the venerable ballpark (July 1, 1943).

As a result of the success of the AAGPBL in its first year, civic groups in each of the four cities agreed to finance their own franchises. Then, the newly formed Milwaukee Chicks and Minneapolis Millerettes entered the league in 1944 and played their home games at American Association ball parks during the time periods the Milwaukee Brewers and Minneapolis Millers male teams were on road trips. As expected, the games schedule and frequent travels from one city to another increased significantly. Nevertheless, Harney went 18–14 (.562) with 88 strikeouts and a 2.84 ERA. In comparison, her teammate Nicol slipped to 17–11 (.608) but led the league with 0.93 ERA. The Comets, now managed by Marty McManus, again placed third (62–54) and made the playoffs, this time thanks to a first-half title. Kenosha took a three-two advantage in the best-of-seven series against the expansion Chicks, but Nicol lost three of four pitching matchups with Connie Wisniewski, including a 2–1, 13 inning-duel, and finished 2–3 with a 1.09 in the finals.

In 1945, Eddie Stumpf became the third different manager of Kenosha in three years, but the team suffered the worst season in franchise history. The Comets ended in last place with a 41–69 record, 26 games out of the first spot in the league. In the collective debacle, Nicol (24) and Harney (14) earned 38 of the 41 victories of their team.

But Harney developed arm and elbow problems after being overused in the previous seasons. She started 1946 with Kenosha and was traded to the expansion Fort Wayne Daisies during the midseason, compiling a collective record of 10–20 in 33 appearances that year.

Harney, who never left school while she was playing for Kenosha, graduated from the University of Wisconsin in 1947. She is also part of the AAGPBL permanent display at the Baseball Hall of Fame and Museum at Cooperstown, New York, opened in 1988, which is dedicated to the entire league rather than any individual player.

== Career statistics ==
Batting

GP	AB	R	H	2B	3B	HR	RBI	SB	TB	BB	SO	BA	OBP	SLG	OPS
173	425	37	58	0	1	0	27	10	60	35	56	.136	.202	.141	.343

Pitching

GP	W	L	W-L%	ERA	IP	R	ER	BB	SO	HB	WP	SO/BB
172	63	85	.426	2.78	1229	610	379	499	366	74	53	0.73
