= Pauline Pirok =

American baseball player (1926–2020)

- Shortstop/Third base
- Born: October 18, 1926; Chicago, Illinois, U.S.
- Died: July 25, 2020 (aged 93)
- Batted: Right Threw: Right

Teams
- Kenosha Comets (1943–1945); South Bend Blue Sox (1945–1948)

Career highlights and awards
- All-Star Team (1943)

Pauline Pirok [pier-ock] (October 18, 1926 – July 25, 2020) was an infielder who played from 1943 through 1948 in the All-American Girls Professional Baseball League (AAGPBL). Listed at 5' 2", 132 lb., Pirok batted and threw right-handed. She earned the nickname Pinky Pirok.

== Biography ==
A native of Chicago, Illinois, Pirok entered the AAGPBL in 1943 with the Kenosha Comets, playing for them two and a half years before joining the South Bend Blue Sox (1945–1948). For six years, she divided her playing time at third base and shortstop, making a few appearances as an emergency pitcher. Her most productive season came in 1943, when she hit a career-best .234 average as a 17-year-old rookie. In that same season, Pirok helped Kenosha beat the Blue Sox in a game, 10–0, collecting four hits in five at-bats, including a double and a triple. In the following series against the Rockford Peaches, which the Comets swept, she kept up her hot hitting going 4-for-10, including four of the eight runs that her team scored in the series. During two consecutive years the Comets advanced to the playoffs, but were beaten in the first round. At the end of the season, she was selected to the All-Star Team.

At one point during the 1945 season she was leading the league with 20 runs batted in, but Kenosha traded her to South Bend along with Phyllis Koehn in return for Lois Florreich and Dorothy Schroeder. After that Pirok injured her ankle and lost the rest of the season. From 1946 to 1948, she was mostly used to fill at infield, outfield and pinch hit, helping South Bend to make the playoffs in these years, but unable to reach the league finals. She was also one of two hundred players to attend the first AAGPBL spring training outside the United States, which was held in 1947 in Cuba at the Gran Stadium de La Habana.

Following her playing career, Pirok worked as a physical education teacher for 36 years in the Chicago Public School system. After retiring, she became an avid golfer to stay active. Pirok latterly lived in Orland Park, Illinois and died in July 2020 at the age of 93.

== Batting statistics ==
| GP | AB | R | H | 2B | 3B | HR | RBI | SB | BA |
|---|---|---|---|---|---|---|---|---|---|
| 559 | 1976 | 226 | 412 | 32 | 14 | 0 | 127 | 223 | .208 |
