= Grand Rapids Chicks =

- 1945–1954; Grand Rapids, Michigan
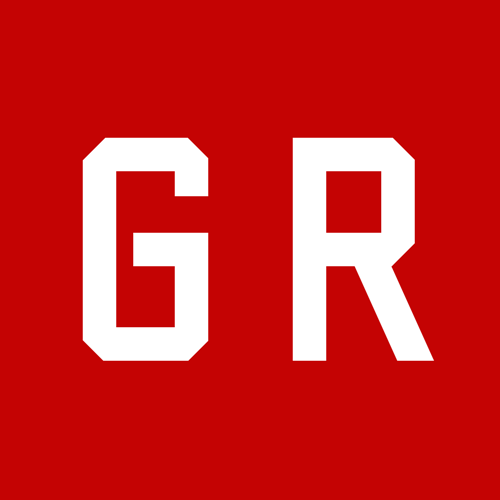

Minor league affiliations
- Previous leagues: All-American Girls Professional Baseball League

Minor league titles
- League titles: 1947, 1953

Team data
- Colors: Red, white
- Previous parks: South High School Field (1945–1949, 1953–1954); Bigelow Field (1950–1952)
- Owner/ Operator: AAGPBL

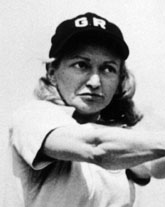
Thelma "Tiby" Eisen in 1945 wearing her Grand Rapids Chicks hat

The Grand Rapids Chicks were a women's professional baseball team based in Grand Rapids, Michigan. They played in the All-American Girls Professional Baseball League (AAGPBL) from 1945 to 1954, winning championships in 1947 and 1953.

== History ==
The franchise originated in 1944 in Milwaukee, Wisconsin as the Milwaukee Chicks. Although the Chicks won the 1944 AAGPBL championship, they could not compete with the minor league Milwaukee Brewers for ticket sales, and the franchise moved to Grand Rapids. They enjoyed continued success following the move, making the playoffs every year until the league folded following the 1954 season.

Grand Rapids had its share of league stars including Players of the Year Connie Wisniewski in 1945 and Alma Ziegler in 1950. League pitching titles were won by Chicks pitchers in 1944 and 1945 by Wisniewski, Mildred Earp in 1947, Alice Haylett in 1948, and Ziegler in 1950. Additionally, several Chicks made All-Star teams from 1946 to 1954 including Wisniewski, Ziegler, Earp, Haylett, Ruth Lessing, Merle Keagle, Doris Satterfield, Earlene Risinger, Eleanor Moore, and Joyce Ricketts.

The Chicks played their home games at South High School in Grand Rapids, with the exception of 1950-1952 when games were played at Bigelow Field in Wyoming Township. After a fire destroyed Bigelow Field, the Chicks returned to South High School through 1954.

== All-time players roster ==
Bold denotes members of the inaugural roster

- Evelyn Adams
- Isabel Alvarez
- Lois Barker
- Charlene Barnett
- Edith Barney
- Betty Bays
- Mary Lou Beschorner
- **Jaynne Bittner**
- **Kay Blumetta**
- Mary Butcher
- Thelma Childress
- Louise Clapp
- Donna Cook
- Patricia Courtney
- Jeanie Descombes
- Mildred Earp
- **Thelma Eisen**
- Lorraine Fisher
- Anita Foss
- Rose Gacioch
- Eileen Gascon
- Barbara Gates
- Jean Geissinger
- **Philomena Gianfrancisco**
- Annie Gosbee
- Thelma Grambo
- Audrey Haine
- Julia Hardin
- Josephine Hasham
- Alice Haylett
- Katherine Herring
- **Joyce Hill**
- Joan Holderness
- Margaret Holgerson
- **Dorothy Hunter**
- Frances Janssen
- Joan Jaykoski
- **Marilyn Jenkins**
- **Josephine Kabick**
- Merle Keagle
- Phyllis Koehn
- Jaynie Krick
- Karen Kunkel
- Beverly Leach
- Annabelle Lee
- Joan LeQuia
- Ruth Lessing
- Kay Lionikas
- **Dorothy Maguire**
- Ruth Mason
- Joyce Messinger
- Dorothy Montgomery
- Dolores Moore
- Eleanor Moore
- Dorothy Mueller
- Doris Neal
- Dolly Niemiec
- Mary E. Norckauer
- Marilyn Olinger
- Lavonne Paire
- Shirley Palesh
- Marguerite Pearson
- Katherine Pechulis
- **Ernestine Petras**
- Betty Petryna
- Magdalen Redman
- Dorice Reid
- Ruth Richard
- Joyce Ricketts
- Earlene Risinger
- Mary Rountree
- Doris Satterfield
- Gloria Schweigerdt
- **Twila Shively**
- Frances Sloan
- Colleen Smith
- Helen Smith
- Jean Smith
- Marjean Smith
- Barbara Sowers
- Rosemary Stevenson
- Jane Stoll
- Dorothy Stolze
- Ruby Stoykovich
- Mary Lou Studnicka
- Shirley Sutherland
- Mary Lou Swanagon
- Yolande Teillet
- Barbara Tetro
- **Doris Tetzlaff**
- **Viola Thompson**
- Ina Dell Towers
- Betty Tucker
- Joan Tysver
- Karen Violetta
- Inez Voyce
- Betty Wanless
- Marie Wegman
- **Margaret Wenzell**
- Vera Whiteman
- **Betty Whiting**
- **Elizabeth Wicken**
- Elsie Wingrove
- **Connie Wisniewski**
- **Sylvia Wronski**
- Renae Youngberg
- Marie Zeigler
- **Alma Ziegler**

== Managers ==
* Benny Meyer	1945
* Johnny Rawlings	1946; 1947; 1948; 1949; 1950
* Mitch Skupien	1951
* Woody English	1952; 1953; 1954

== Season-by-season records ==
- 1945: 60–50
- 1946: 71–41
- 1947: 65-47 *
- 1948: 77–47
- 1949: 57–54
- 1950: 59–53
- 1951: 71–35
- 1952: 50–60
- 1953: 62-44 *
- 1954: 46–45

* Championship season

== Sources ==
- All-American Girls Professional Baseball League history
- All-American Girls Professional Baseball League official website – Grand Rapids Chicks seasons
- All-American Girls Professional Baseball League official website – Manager/Player profile search results
- Draeger, Carey (Sept./Oct. 1997). "Girls of Summer". Michigan History. Archived from the original.
- All-American Girls Professional Baseball League Record Book – W. C. Madden. Publisher: McFarland & Company, 2000. Format: Hardcover, 294pp. Language: English. ISBN 0-7864-0597-X
- The Women of the All-American Girls Professional Baseball League: A Biographical Dictionary – W. C. Madden. Publisher: McFarland & Company, 2005. Format: Softcover, 295 pp. Language: English. ISBN 978-0-7864-2263-0
