= Lois Florreich =

- Pitcher / Utility player
- Born: April 29, 1927; Webster Groves, Missouri, U.S.
- Died: September 11, 1991 (aged 64); Sea of Cortez, Mexico
- Batted: Right Threw: Right

debut
- 1943, for the South Bend Blue Sox

Last appearance
- 1950, for the Rockford Peaches

Career statistics
- Win–loss record: 86–60
- Earned run average: 1.41
- Strikeouts: 774

Teams
- South Bend Blue Sox (1943–1945); Kenosha Comets (1945–1946); Rockford Peaches (1947–1950)

Career highlights and awards
- 3× AAGPBL All-Star Team (1948–1950); 3× AAGPBL champion (1948–1950); AAGPBL ERA leader (1949); 2× AAGPBL strikeout leader (1949, 1950); Pitched a postseason no-hitter on September 9, 1948; AAGPBL records: Season record for lowest ERA: 0.67 (1949); Tied for most stolen bases in a game: 7 (1944)

Kathleen Lois "Flash" Florreich (April 29, 1927 – September 11, 1991) was a pitcher and utility player who played from 1943 through 1950 for three different teams of the All-American Girls Professional Baseball League (AAGPBL). Listed at 5 ft 5 in (1.65 m), 140 lb., Florreich batted and threw right-handed. She was born in Webster Groves, Missouri.

== Overview profile ==
By the time she pitched her final game in 1950, Lois Florreich had been selected three times as an All-Star in the All-American Girls Professional Baseball League. A member of three championship teams, she set an all-time season record for lowest earned run average, twice led the league in strikeouts, added single-season titles in complete games and innings pitched, three times won 20 or more games, and also tied an all-time record for most stolen bases in a single game. In its 12 years of history, the AAGPBL evolved through many stages, including shifting from underhand to sidearm to overhand pitching, but Florreich easily made the transition in each one of the changes.

== A brief history ==
By 1943, a new All-American Girls Softball League was formed, playing a hybrid form of softball and baseball that never really became baseball until overhand pitching began in 1948. The league, which started largely to provide entertainment for baseball fans whose beloved heroes had gone off to World War II, would eventually shift gears and become the All-American Girls Professional Baseball League, and was dissolved at the end of the 1954 season.

About 500 girls attended the initial call. Of these, only 280 were invited to the final try-outs at Wrigley Field in Chicago, where 60 of them were chosen to become the first women to ever play professional baseball. The 60 players were placed on the rosters of four fifteen-player teams based in Rockford of Illinois, South Bend of Indiana, and Racine and Kenosha of Wisconsin. Lois Florreich survived the final cut to become one of the original players signed by the league. She was also one of 13 players hailed from Missouri who made the league in its 12 years of existence.

== AAGPBL career ==
Florreich entered the AAGPBL in 1943 with the South Bend Blue Sox, playing for them two and a half years before joining the Kenosha Comets (1945-'46) and Rockford Peaches (1947-'50). Although originally a center fielder with South Bend, she switched to third base with Kenosha in 1945 and became a part-time pitcher in 1946, joining a pitching staff bolstered by Helen Nicol.

In her rookie season, Florreich tied for third place with four home runs and was among the top 10 hitters in doubles (nine, 5th), stolen bases (57, 6th), runs batted in (43, 8th) and total bases (114, 10th). In 1944, she hit just a .178 batting average but stole 113 bases, including seven in a single game to tie an all-time record. She finished seventh in stolen bases and tied for fourth in triples (six). Considering the AAGPBL was using underhand pitching and a softball with a 12-inch (300 mm) circumference, her numbers were quite respectable.

During the 1945 midseason, South Bend sent Florreich, who was batting .223, along with Dorothy Schroeder (.179) to Kenosha in exchange for Pauline Pirok, who was leading the league with 20 RBI, and Phyllis Koehn (2nd, 18 RBI). In her first four seasons, Florreich hit a .205 average. While playing at third base for Kenosha in 1946, she only hit .234, but the team counted on her not for her bat but for her fielding and as a pitching prospect. She went 9–16 with a 2.40 ERA in 1946, and improved to 13–19 and a 1.68 ERA in 1947 after being traded to the Rockford Peaches. She was also one of two hundred players to attend the first AAGPBL spring training outside the United States, which was held in 1947 in Cuba at the Gran Estadio de La Habana.

In 1948, once Florreich threw exclusively overhand, she became one of the most dominant pitchers of the league. She went 22–10 with a 1.18 ERA and a .687 winning percentage, finishing tied for third in ERA, fourth in wins, and second with 231 strikeouts, being surpassed only by Joanne Winter (256), who also tied for first in victories (25) with Alice Haylett. Florreich made the All-Star Team for the initial time, while the Peaches, with Bill Allington at the helm, won their third Championship Title in six years. In Game 1 of the first round, Florreich hurled the first no-hitter in postseason history against her former Kenosha teammates.

Florreich entered the baseball record books in 1949, by leading all pitchers with a 0.67 ERA to set an AAGPBL all-time, single-season mark. She surpassed Rockford teammate Helen Nicol, who posted a 0.98 ERA, and Jean Faut of South Bend who ended with 1.10. For the second consecutive year Florreich won 20 games, going 22–7 with nine shutouts. She also led the circuit with 210 strikeouts, 26 complete games, 269 innings and a .759 winning percentage. In addition, she finished second in wins and shutouts behind Faut, who collected 24 and 12, respectively. Florreich garnered her second All-Star selection while the Peaches clinched their second title in a row.

In 1950, Florreich turned in another stellar performance during her final year of play. She made her third straight All-Star appearance, again won 20 games (20–8), recorded a 1.18 ERA, and led the league with 171 strikeouts – 53 more than second place Faut. Her ERA was 0.06 behind leader Faut, and finished second in complete games (28) and third in wins. Florreich also set a personal mark with 22 strikeouts in a nine-inning game. She was injured for the Championship Series against the Fort Wayne Daisies, but the Peaches still won in seven games to become the most successful team in All-American Girls Professional Baseball League history, winning four titles in 12 seasons, including three in a row.

== Career statistics ==
Pitching

GP	W	L	W-L%	ERA	IP	H	RA	ER	BB	SO	WHIP	SO/BB
165	86	60	.589	1.40	1304	708	343	203	449	774	0.89	1.72

Batting

GP	AB	R	H	2B	3B	HR	RBI	SB	TB	BB	SO	BA	OBP	SLG	OPS
504	1774	242	362	31	27	6	139	251	465	170	238	.204	.274	.262	.536

Fielding

GP	PO	A	E	TC	DP	FA
423	547	919	152	1618	36	.906

== Life after baseball ==
Florreich, who never married, owned and operated the Sonic Wire Company in Los Angeles, California, until 1968. She also operated a mobile home park in northern Idaho and a RV park and resort in Spokane, Washington before retiring. A woman who loved to travel, fish, and be outdoors, Florreich lived the rest of her life in the Gulf of California area in Mexico, where she died at the age of 64.

== Facts ==
- The 0.67 ERA, AAGPBL season-record set by Lois Florreich in 269.0 innings in 1949, is also the lowest single-season ERA in American professional baseball history. She is followed by:
  - Tim Keefe of the Troy Trojans, 0.86, 105.0 innings, National League, 1880
  - Dutch Leonard of the Boston Red Sox, 0.96, 224 2/3 innings, American League, 1914
  - Bob Gibson of the St. Louis Cardinals, 1.12, 304 2/3 innings, National League, 1968
- Florreich was nicknamed Flash because her strong fastball and her basestealing ability.
- The AAGPBL folded in 1954, but there is now a permanent display at the Baseball Hall of Fame and Museum at Cooperstown, New York, since November 5, 1988 that honors those who were part of this unique experience. Florreich and the rest of the girls finally received the recognition they deserved, when the entire AAGPBL is now enshrined in the Hall rather than any individual player.
- A League of Their Own is a 1992 film about the first season of the All-American Girls Professional Baseball League. While the film does not use real names, filmmaker Penny Marshall seemed to be aiming for realism, as her film includes fake newsreel footage and pseudo-documentary present day scenes at the beginning and end of the fictitious story. A League of Their Own itself was inspired by the 1987 documentary of the same title, written and produced by Kelly Candaele, one of the five sons of Helen Callaghan, who in 1945 won the AAGPBL batting championship with a .299 average. Florreich, like many of her colleagues, was relatively unknown until the Marshall's film was exhibited for the first time.
