= Phyllis Koehn =

- Pitcher / Utility
- Born: September 15, 1922; Madison, Wisconsin, U.S.
- Died: May 28, 2007 (aged 84); Downers Grove, Illinois, U.S.
- Batted: Right Threw: Right

debut
- 1943

Last appearance
- 1950

Teams
- Kenosha Comets (1943–'45); South Bend Blue Sox (1945–'48); Peoria Redwings (1948); Racine Belles (1948–'49); Fort Wayne Daisies (1949); Grand Rapids Chicks (1950)

Career highlights and awards
- Seven playoff appearances (1943-'44, 1946-'50); Women in Baseball – AAGPBL Permanent Display at Baseball Hall of Fame and Museum (1988)

Phyllis C. Koehn [″Sugar″] (September 15, 1922 – May 28, 2007) was an American pitcher and utility who played from 1943 through 1950 for six different teams of the All-American Girls Professional Baseball League (AAGPBL). Listed at 5' 5", 120 lb., Koehn batted and threw right-handed. She was born in Madison, Wisconsin.

By the fall of 1942, World War II had caused many Minor League Baseball teams to disband. Young men were being drafted into the armed services, and many feared the worst for Major League Baseball. Philip K. Wrigley, who was in charge both of the Wrigley Company and the Chicago Cubs National League club, searched for a possible solution to this dilemma. The answer was to establish a women's professional baseball league as a promotional sideline to maintain the public interest in baseball.

A versatile and dependable player, Koehn was able to play all positions except catcher, playing mainly as a starting pitcher. She entered the AAGPBL in 1943 with the Kenosha Comets, playing for them two and a half years before joining the South Bend Blue Sox (1945-'48), Peoria Redwings (1948), Racine Belles (1948-'49), Fort Wayne Daisies (1949) and Grand Rapids Chicks (1950). In her rookie season, she hit a respectable .238 batting average with four home runs, considering the league's dead-ball era.

Koehn started 1945 in good form. At one point during the season she was second in the league with 18 runs batted in, but Kenosha traded her to South Bend along with Pauline Pirok (first with 20 RBI) in exchange for Lois Florreich (.243 BA) and Dorothy Schroeder (.179 BA). Her most productive season came in 1946, when she won a career high 22 games as a pitcher after the league expanded to eight teams. She made seven playoffs appearances with Kenosha (1943-'44), South Bend (1946-'47), Racine (1948), Fort Wayne (1949) and Grand Rapids (1950), but could not reach the league finals. She was also one of two hundred players to attend the first AAGPBL spring training outside the United States, which was held in 1947 in Cuba at the Gran Stadium de La Habana.

Following her baseball career, Koehn went to work for Zenith Electronics for 34 years. She never married but was a loving caregiver to her nephews and great-nieces and nephews. After retiring, she stayed active as a bowler and golfer.

Phyllis Koehn, along with her former teammates and opponents, received their long overdue recognition when the Baseball Hall of Fame and Museum dedicated a permanent display to the All American Girls Professional Baseball League in 1988. She lived the last years of her life in Downers Grove, Illinois, where she died at the age of 84.

== Career statistics ==
Pitching

GP	W	L	W-L%	ERA	IP	H	RA	ER	BB	SO	WHIP
124	48	54	.471	2.55	886	631	393	251	413	234	1.19

Batting

GP	AB	R	H	2B	3B	HR	RBI	SB	TB	BB	SO	BA	OBP	SLG
587	1946	199	390	37	21	6	195	116	487	97	143	.200	.238	.250

Fielding

GP	PO	A	E	TC	DP	FA
410	657	541	106	1304	18	.921
