= Mary Pratt (baseball) =

American baseball player (1918–2020)

- Pitcher
- Born: November 30, 1918; Bridgeport, Connecticut, U.S.
- Died: May 6, 2020 (aged 101); Braintree, Massachusetts, U.S.
- Batted: Left Threw: Left

AAGPBL debut
- 1943

Last AAGPBL appearance
- 1947

Career statistics
- Win–loss record: 28–51
- Earned run average: 3.48
- Strikeouts: 55

Teams
- Rockford Peaches (1943–1944); Kenosha Comets (1944–1945); Rockford Peaches (1946–1947)

Career highlights and awards
- Pitched a no-hitter (1944)

Mary Pratt (November 30, 1918 – May 6, 2020) was a pitcher who played from 1943 through 1947 in the All-American Girls Professional Baseball League (AAGPBL). She batted and threw left-handed. Pratt turned 100 in November 2018.

== Early life ==
Pratt was born in Bridgeport, Connecticut, and grew up in Quincy, Massachusetts. She attended North Quincy High School. After graduation, she entered Boston University's Sargent College of Health and Rehabilitation Sciences and participated in various sports there, including basketball, softball, volleyball, lacrosse, field hockey, tennis, archery, and sailing. Pratt earned a degree in physical education in 1940.

== AAGPBL career ==
In 1941, Pratt got a job teaching in Quincy. The All-American Girls Professional Baseball League formed at around that time, and after the school year ended in 1943, Pratt joined the league as a member of the Rockford Peaches. She played in 24 games during her first season, going 5–11 on the mound and batting .235.

The following season, Pratt was transferred to the Kenosha Comets team. She immediately had her best season, winning 21 games and pitching a no-hitter, while leading the Comets to the league championship series. During this time, Pratt "was very effective using a controlled slingshot or windmill windup to get hitters out".

Pratt slumped in 1945, going just 1–16. She won just 1 more game in 1946 and 1947 before retiring from professional baseball.

== Later life ==
Pratt continued to teach physical education classes in Quincy until 1986, and she also coached the school softball, basketball, soccer, and tennis teams. She won 10 softball championships in the state of Massachusetts.

Pratt has been inducted into the New England Sports Museum, Boston University Hall of Fame, and Boston Garden Hall of Fame.

Pratt died at the John Scott nursing home in Braintree, Massachusetts, on May 6, 2020, aged 101.
