= Doris Barr =

Canadian baseball player

- Pitcher
- Born: August 26, 1921; Starbuck, Manitoba, Canada
- Died: July 12, 2009 (aged 87); Winnipeg, Manitoba, Canada
- Batted: Left Threw: Left

debut
- 1943,, for the South Bend Blue Sox

Last appearance
- 1952,, for the Peoria Redwings

Career statistics
- Win–loss record: 79–94
- Strikeouts: 572
- Earned run average: 3.16
- Games pitched: 218
- Stats at Baseball Reference

Teams
- South Bend Blue Sox (1943–1946); Racine Belles (1946–1947); Springfield Sallies (1948); Muskegon Lassies (1949); Kalamazoo Lassies (1950); Peoria Redwings (1950)

Career highlights and awards
- AAGPBL champion (1946); Pitched two no-hitter (1945, 1947); Manitoba Softball Hall of Fame (2004)

Doris "Dodie" Barr (August 26, 1921 – July 12, 2009) was a Canadian pitcher who played from 1943 through 1952 in the All-American Girls Professional Baseball League (AAGPBL). Listed at 5' 6", 145 lb., Barr batted and threw left-handed. She was born in Starbuck, Manitoba, Canada.

== Early life ==
Doris, daughter of Malcolm and Susan Barr, was just a small town girl before she found herself being swept up into the world of women's baseball at the height of the World War II. A dominant lefty hurler, she enjoyed a prolific career over eight seasons in the All-American Girls Professional Baseball League, winning a League Championship title and earning three inductions into several baseball halls of fame across North America.

The AAGBL flourished in the 1940s when the Major Leagues went on hold as men went to war. The league lasted a little over a decade, dismantling in 1954. Still, the void the league filled during wartime was inspiration enough for the 1992 film A League of Their Own, directed by Penny Marshall and starred by Geena Davis, Tom Hanks and Madonna.

== Career ==
Barr started her baseball career in 1937 when she was just 16, after being spotted by scouts while playing catch with her sister. That sparked a five-year stint in Canada, where she pitched for the Winnipeg Ramblers (1938–1939) and Regina Army and Navy Bombers (1940–1942). She was picked up by the AAGBL when she was 21, and earned a reputation as a powerful lefty hurler with a rocket of a throw. While playing for the Bombers in 1941, she was credited for their title-winning victory over Saskatoon.

Barr entered the league in 1943 with the South Bend Blue Sox, playing for them three and a half years before joining the Racine Belles (1946–1947), Springfield Sallies (1948), Muskegon Lassies (1949), Peoria Redwings (1950) and Kalamazoo Lassies (1950). Her most productive season came in 1945, both for South Bend and Racine, when she posted career-numbers in wins (20), earned run average (1.71) and winning percentage (.714), while striking out 104 in 31 pitching appearances. That same season, she also pitched the first no-hitter in Racine history in a game against the Fort Wayne Daisies (July 1, 1945). She later pitched another one in 1947.

In 1946 Barr helped Racine to a Championship after pitching the winning game that put them in the playoffs. The next season, he went 14–12 with a 2.26 ERA and 96 strikeouts, while in 1948 she recorded a 2.68 ERA with a career-high 116 strikeouts despite her 7–19 record for the Sallies.

In an eight-season career, Barr posted a 79–94 record with a 3.16 ERA and 572 strikeouts in 218 games. She also helped herself with the bat, hitting a 2.69 batting average, and was a competent outfielder as well, collecting a .932 lifetime fielding average.

== Personal life ==
Barr retired in 1950 and settled into a life as an accountant at Grace Hospital in Winnipeg, Manitoba, and later worked in the accounting department at the Health Sciences Centre.

Eleven girls from Manitoba played in the AAGPBL, including Barr. Her contributions received blanket notice when the AAGPBL was included in an exhibit at the National Baseball Hall of Fame in 1988. The Canadian Baseball Hall of Fame honored Canadian-born AAGPBL players with a blanket induction in 1998. In addition, she gained induction in the Manitoba Softball Hall of Fame in 2004.

Barr never married and did not have children, although she enjoyed the company of numerous nieces and nephews. She died at Winnipeg, at the age of 87, and was buried in the Chapel Lawn Memorial Garden.

== Statistics ==
Year	Club(s)	GP	W	L	SO	ERA
1943	South Bend Blue Sox	32	15	13	63	2.90
1944	South Bend Blue Sox	29	8	11	62	2.98
1945	South Bend Blue Sox	31	20	8	104	1.71
1946	South Bend Blue Sox; Racine Belles	21	6	8	53	3.86
1947	Racine Belles	30	14	12	96	2.26
1948	Springfield Sallies	30	7	19	116	2.68
1949	Muskegon Lassies	27	8	13	53	2.40
1950	Kalamazoo Lassies; Peoria Redwings	18	1	11	25	6.51
8 seasons	Totals	218	79	94	572	3.16

== Sources ==
- All-American Girls Professional Baseball League Record Book – W. C. Madden. Publisher: McFarland & Company. Format: Paperback, 294pp. Language: English. ISBN 0-7864-3747-2. ISBN 978-0-7864-3747-4
- August 15, 1943: Canada’s Olive Little tosses first no-hit, no-run game in AAGPBL history. by Gary Belleville. Society for American Baseball Research. Retrieved 2026-03-03.
