= Alice Haylett =

- Pitcher / Outfielder
- Born: April 23, 1923; Coldwater, Michigan, U.S.
- Died: March 27, 2004 (aged 80); Lakeland, Florida, U.S.
- Batted: Right Threw: Right

Teams
- Grand Rapids Chicks (1946–1949)

Career highlights and awards
- All-Star Team (1948); Championship Title (1947); Two playoff appearances (1948–'49); Single-season leader in wins, winning percentage and earned run average (1948)

Alice Haylett (April 2, 1923 – March 27, 2004), nicknamed "Al" and "Sis", was a female pitcher who played from 1946 through 1949 in the All-American Girls Professional Baseball League (AAGPBL). Listed at 5 ft 6 in (1.68 m), 155 lb., she batted and threw right-handed.

== Biography ==
A native of Coldwater, Michigan, Haylett grew up in a farm family of English, Pennsylvania Dutch, and Indian ancestry. She graduated from Coldwater High School in 1940, and after taking a summer job in Battle Creek, Michigan she worked full-time for five years and played softball for several local teams. She heard about the All-American Girls Professional Baseball League from Betty Whiting, a fellow softball player who had entered the league in 1945 with the Milwaukee Chicks. Haylett attended a tryout for the league in 1946, and was assigned to the Grand Rapids Chicks, playing for them for the next four years.

In her rookie season, Haylett hit a .221 batting average playing briefly at outfield. Grand Rapids finished in second place that season. In 1947, she joined the pitching staff and posted a 19–11 record, helping her team to clinch the championship. Her most productive season came in 1948, just when the league changed to pitching overhand and adopted a smaller ball. She made the adjustments, relying on a strong fastball and a breaking curve that baffled opposite hitters who tried to analyze her pitches. Haylett finished with a 25–5 mark, led the league in winning percentage (.833) and earned run average (0.77), and tied with Joanne Winter in victories. She was named Pitcher of the Year and also earned an All-Star berth. With Haylett at the mound, the Chicks won the 1947 AAGPBL Championship Title and reached the playoffs in 1948 and 1949. However, she ended her career prematurely after developing a sore pitching arm in her last season.

Haylett, who never married, worked at the Kellogg Company in Battle Creek for 30 years and retired to Florida in 1981. She returned to softball briefly, and eventually played golf. She died at her Lakeland, Florida home on March 27, 2004, three weeks before her 81st birthday.

== Career statistics ==
Pitching

GP	W	L	W-L%	ERA	IP	H	RA	ER	BB	SO	HBP	WP	WHIP	SO/BB
128	70	47	.598	1.92	1044	690	303	223	405	390	39	27	1.049	0.96

Batting

GP	AB	R	H	2B	3B	HR	RBI	SB	TB	BB	SO	BA	OBP	SLG	OPS
137	370	29	64	6	2	0	25	2	74	30	30	.173	.235	.200	.435
