= List of people from Rockford, Illinois =

Notable people associated with Rockford, Illinois

The following list includes notable people who were born, raised, or have lived in Rockford, Illinois. For a similar list organized alphabetically by last name, see the category page People from Rockford, Illinois.

== Academics, science, and engineering ==
- James Henry Breasted, scholar, first American teacher of Egyptology
- Griffith Buck, rose breeder
- Richard Bulliet, scholar of the Middle East
- Robert Clodius, educator, acting President of the University of Wisconsin–Madison
- James A. Davis, chair of sociology department, Harvard University, and professor, University of Chicago
- Arnold Krammer, historian, resided in Rockford from 1970 to 1974 while on the faculty of Rockford College; at Texas A&M University from 1974 to retirement in 2015
- James Lindgren, law professor and sociologist, Northwestern University
- John Henry Manny, inventor, founder of Manny Reaper Works
- Fred Merkel, broadcast engineer for Premiere Networks and iHeartMedia
- Anna Peck Sill (1816-1889), educator
- Adaline Emerson Thompson, benefactor and educational leader
- Gordon Tullock, economist and one of the founders of public choice
- Janice E. Voss, astronaut and engineer; lived in Rockford
- Daniel Hale Williams, surgeon, first doctor to successfully complete open heart surgery; founder of the first integrated American hospital, Provident Hospital of Cook County

== Business ==
- Virgil Abloh (1980–2021), fashion designer and businessman
- Robert Greenblatt, Fox, Showtime and NBC producer and executive, and former Chairman of WarnerMedia Entertainment.
- Albert Henry Loeb (1868–1924), attorney and business executive, Sears
- Pehr August Peterson (1846–1927), business executive, Sundstrand Corporation
- John Sall, co-founder of SAS Institute
- Albert Spalding (1850–1915), co-founder of Spalding; pitcher with Rockford Forest Citys; manager of Chicago White Stockings; executive of National League of Baseball Clubs; inductee in National Baseball Hall of Fame

== Entertainment and media ==
=== Acting ===
- Ginger Lynn Allen, porn actress
- Jodi Benson, voice actress, Ariel in The Little Mermaid
- Barbara Hale, actress, Perry Mason
- Kathryn Layng, actress, Doogie Howser, M.D.
- Natasha Leggero, comedian, actress
- Joseph Mantello, actor, director, Wicked, Take Me Out, Assassins
- Andra Martin, actress, Up Periscope, The Thing That Couldn't Die
- Marin Mazzie, Tony Award nominated actress and singer known for, Kiss Me, Kate (1999-2001), and her other work in musical theater.
- Aidan Quinn, actor, Desperately Seeking Susan, Elementary, Legends of the Fall
- Anthony Tyler Quinn, actor, Boy Meets World
- Betty Jane Rhodes, actress, singer, Sweater Girl, The Fleet's In
- Susan Saint James, actress, Kate & Allie, McMillan & Wife
- Linda Wallem, actress, writer, producer, Nurse Jackie
- Stephen Wallem, singer, actor, Nurse Jackie

=== Animation ===
- Bill Kopp, animator

=== Cinematography ===
- Declan Quinn, cinematographer, Leaving Las Vegas, Kama Sutra: A Tale of Love, U2's "I Still Haven't Found What I'm Looking For"

=== Directing ===
- Bing Liu, director, Minding the Gap

=== Music ===
- Emily Bear, pianist, composer
- Bun E. Carlos, drummer, Cheap Trick
- Chuckey Charles, film composer and music producer
- Kurt Elling, jazz vocalist, composer, lyricist
- Katherine Tanner Fisk, contralto concert singer
- Swan Hennessy, classical composer
- Joie De Vivre (band), emo band
- Sarah Kelly, singer, songwriter
- Matthew McDonough, drummer for Mudvayne
- Lou Musa, guitarist, The Verve Pipe
- Ann Nesby, singer, producer, part of the urban Gospel group Sounds Of Blackness
- Rick Nielsen, lead guitarist for Cheap Trick
- Tom Petersson, bass guitarist for Cheap Trick
- Marty Ross, musician, songwriter and performer
- Jake Runestad, composer and conductor
- Nellie Strong Stevenson, pianist, music educator, clubwoman
- Shawn Wade, bass guitarist for 12 Stones
- Ryley Walker, guitarist
- Michelle Williams, singer and member of the R&B group Destiny's Child
- Robin Zander, vocalist and rhythm guitarist for Cheap Trick

=== Photography ===
- Alvin C. Jacobs Jr., documentary photographer and image activist

=== Special effects ===
- Shaun Smith, visual effects

=== Television ===
- Paris Bennett, contestant on Season 5 of American Idol
- Kelly Killoren Bensimon model, former cast member of Real Housewives of New York City
- Auntie Heroine, drag queen and contestant on Season 6 of The Boulet Brothers' Dragula
- Heather Nauert, television journalist; born in Rockford

=== Writing ===
- Robert Lee Maupin Beck, writer, producer, Pimp: The Story of My Life
- Stewart Brand, writer, editor, publisher and environmentalist: The Whole Earth Catalog, The WELL, Long Now Foundation, and, Whole Earth Discipline: An Ecopragmatist Manifesto.
- Thomas Fleming, writer, editor, Chronicles: A Magazine of American Culture
- John Ortberg, author, pastor
- Will Pfeifer, comic book writer
- Shawn Ryan, television producer, screenwriter (The Shield)
- Barbara Santucci, artist, poet, author
- Erica Spindler, author
- Leopold Tyrmand, novelist, editor, dissident; originally from Poland
- Kimberla Lawson Roby, New York Times bestselling author
- Cora Stuart Wheeler (1852–1897), poet, author

== Politics and law ==
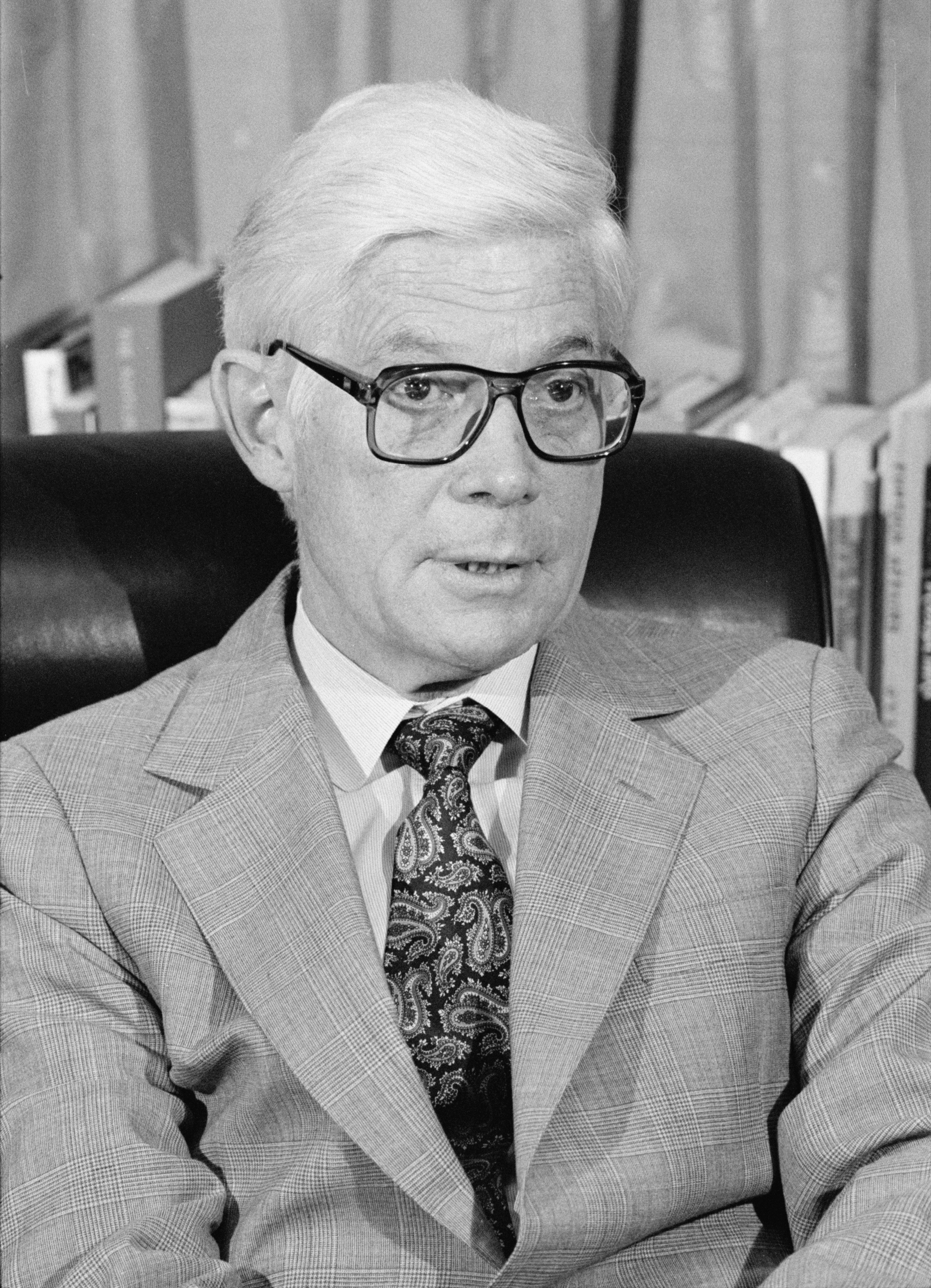
John B. Anderson

- John B. Anderson, US Representative, US presidential candidate
- John Baumgarten, Illinois House of Representatives
- Debra Bowen, Secretary of State of California, 2007–2015
- William Brown, Illinois House of Representatives
- John T. Buckbee, US Representative
- Robert R. Canfield, Illinois state legislator and lawyer
- James E. Cartwright, US Marine Corps general; Vice Chairman Joint Chiefs of Staff
- Ho Chung, Patent attorney
- Mary Lou Cowlishaw, Illinois House of Representatives
- Barbara Giolitto, Illinois House of Representatives
- Edolo J. Giorgi, Illinois House of Representatives
- Rodney Grams, Republican United States Senator, news anchor, WIFR 23 Rockford
- Elizabeth Hanson, CIA officer
- Joyce Holmberg, educator and Illinois state senator
- Alta M. Hulett, attorney, first woman admitted to the state of Illinois Bar
- Betty Ann Keegan, Illinois State Senator
- Julia Lathrop, social and political activist, subject of biography My Friend, Julia Lathrop (1935) by Jane Addams
- Emma Octavia Lundberg, Swedish-American child welfare advocate.
- Donald A. Manzullo, United States Representative
- Lynn Morley Martin, United States Representative, United States Secretary of Labor
- Stanley Mosk, Justice, Supreme Court of California
- David Campbell Mulford, United States Ambassador to India; Vice-Chairman International, Credit Suisse
- Paula J. Raschke-Lind, Illinois state politician
- Bertil T. Rosander, Illinois state legislator and businessman
- Benjamin R. Sheldon, Chief Justice of the Illinois Supreme Court
- Eric Sorensen, meteorologist and politician
- Steve Stadelman, Illinois state senator
- Fred E. Sterling, Illinois politician
- Thomas E. Ticen, Minnesota state legislator and lawyer

== Sports ==
=== Baseball ===
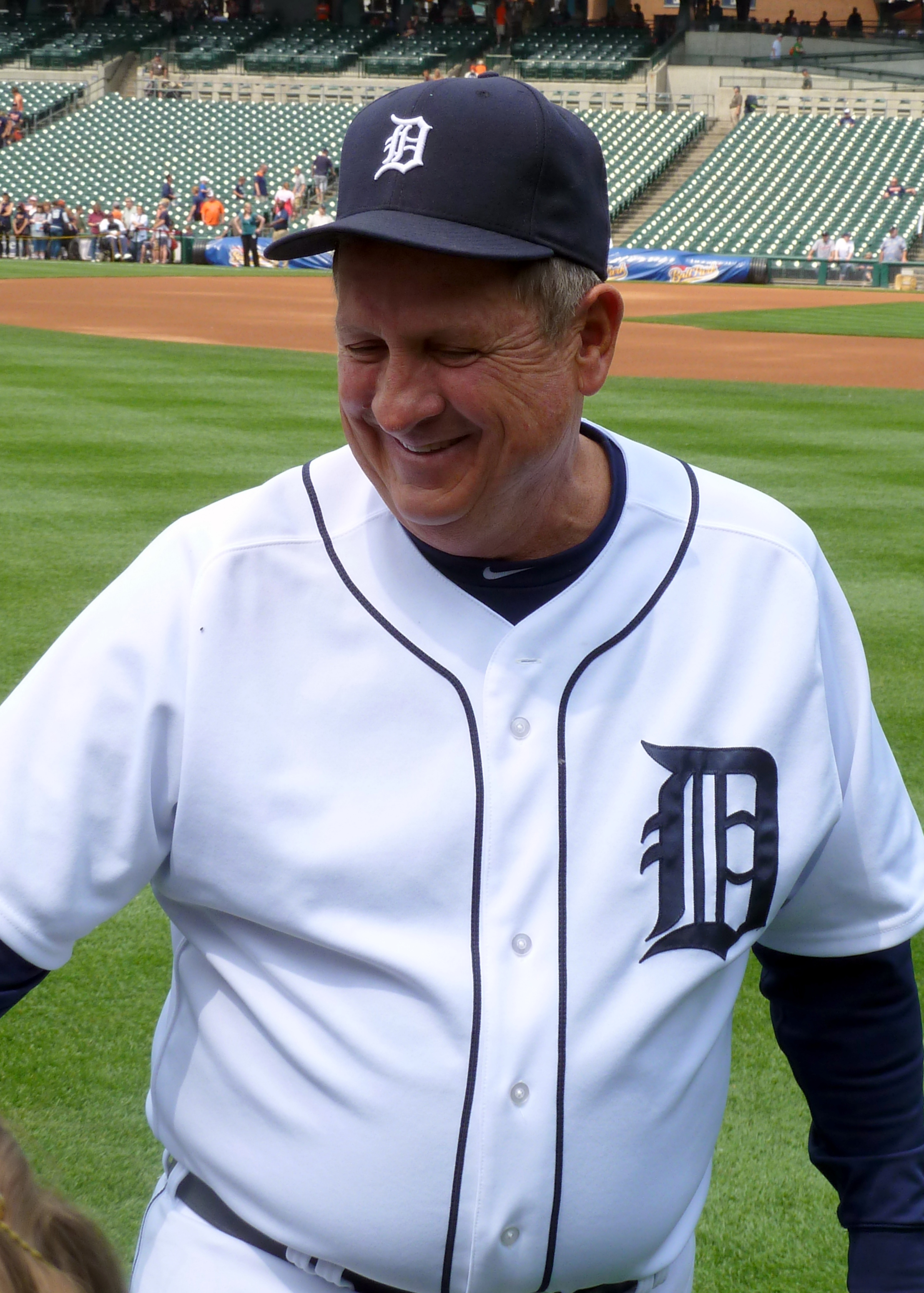
Gene Lamont

- Ross Barnes (1850–1915), second baseman, shortstop, Boston Red Stockings
- Aldine Calacurcio, All-American Girls Professional Baseball League player, Rockford Peaches, born in Rockford
- Hal Carlson, pitcher for Chicago Cubs
- Jean Cione, All-American Girls Professional Baseball League player, Rockford Peaches, born in Rockford
- Orville Jorgens, pitcher, Philadelphia Phillies
- Margaret Jurgensmeier, All-American Girls Professional Baseball League player, Rockford Peaches, born in Rockford
- Gene Lamont, catcher, coach, manager, Detroit Tigers, Pittsburgh Pirates, Chicago White Sox
- Berith Melin, All-American Girls Professional Baseball League player, Rockford Peaches, born in Rockford
- Rodney Myers, pitcher, Chicago Cubs, San Diego Padres, Los Angeles Dodgers
- Hattie Peterson, All-American Girls Professional Baseball League player, Rockford Peaches, born in Winnebago, Illinois
- Ken Rudolph, catcher, Chicago Cubs, St. Louis Cardinals, San Francisco Giants, Baltimore Orioles
- Jake Smolinski, outfielder, Texas Rangers; born in Rockford
- Harry Sullivan, pitcher, St. Louis Cardinals
- Ed Swartwood, player, umpire, Pittsburgh Pirates
- Charles Swindells, catcher, St. Louis Cardinals
- Daniel E. Tipple, pitcher, New York Yankees; born in Rockford

=== Basketball ===
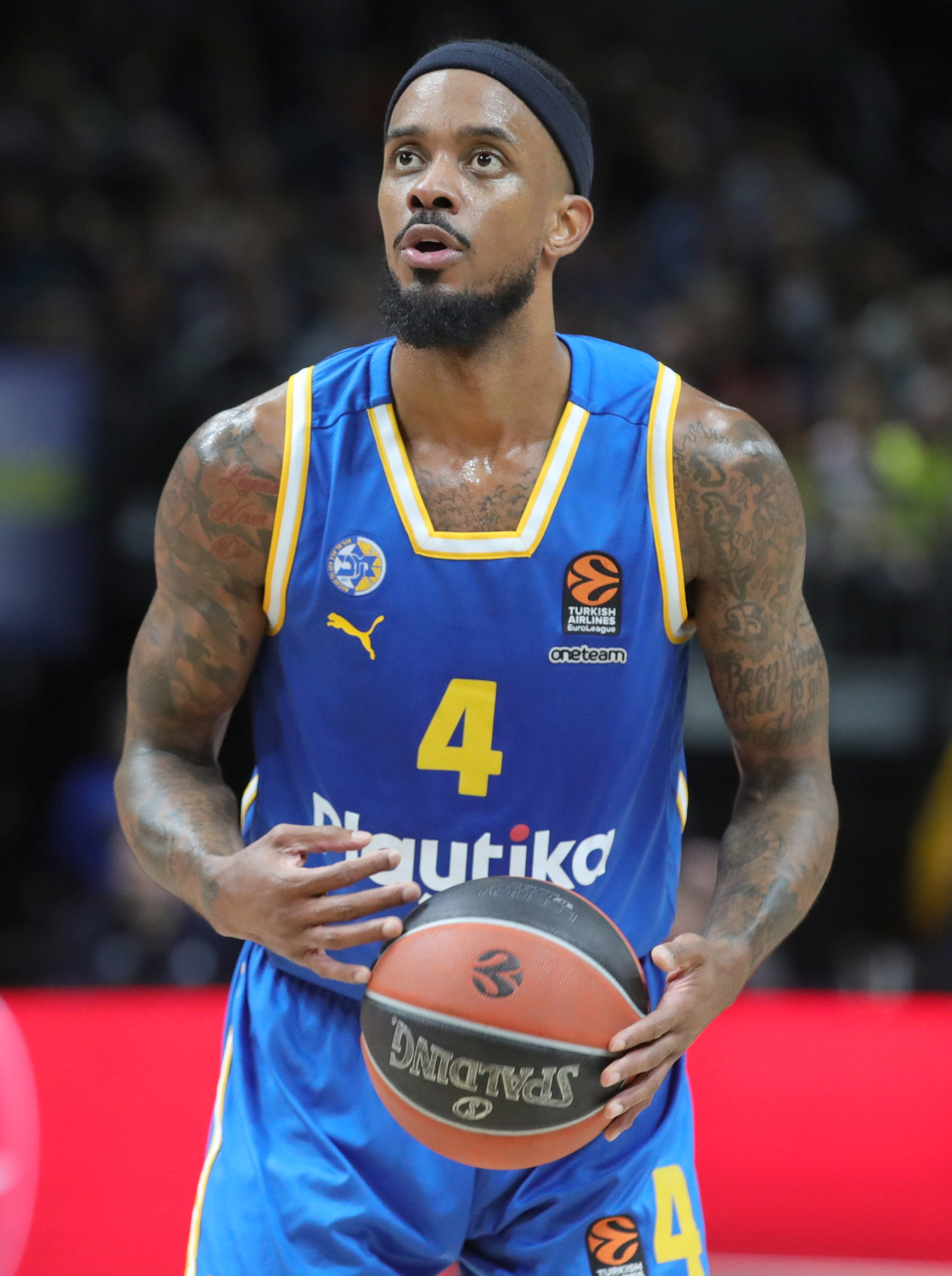
Lorenzo Brown

- Lorenzo Brown (born 1990), basketball player in the Israeli Basketball Premier League, formerly in the NBA
- Bill Erickson (1928 –1987), player for Illinois in 1949 Final Four
- John E. Erickson (1927– 2020), coach, University of Wisconsin, and GM of Milwaukee Bucks
- Ernie Kent (born 1955), coach, Washington State University and University of Oregon
- JP Tokoto (born 1993), basketball player
- Fred VanVleet (born 1994), NBA basketball player

=== Billiards ===
- Dallas West, pool player; inducted into the Billiard Congress of America Hall of Fame (1996)

=== Boxing ===
- Kenneth Gould, boxer, 1988 United States Olympics welterweight bronze medalist
- Sammy Mandell, boxer, World Boxing Association lightweight champion

=== Diving ===
- Ronald Merriott, Olympic diver; 1984 bronze medalist

=== Football ===
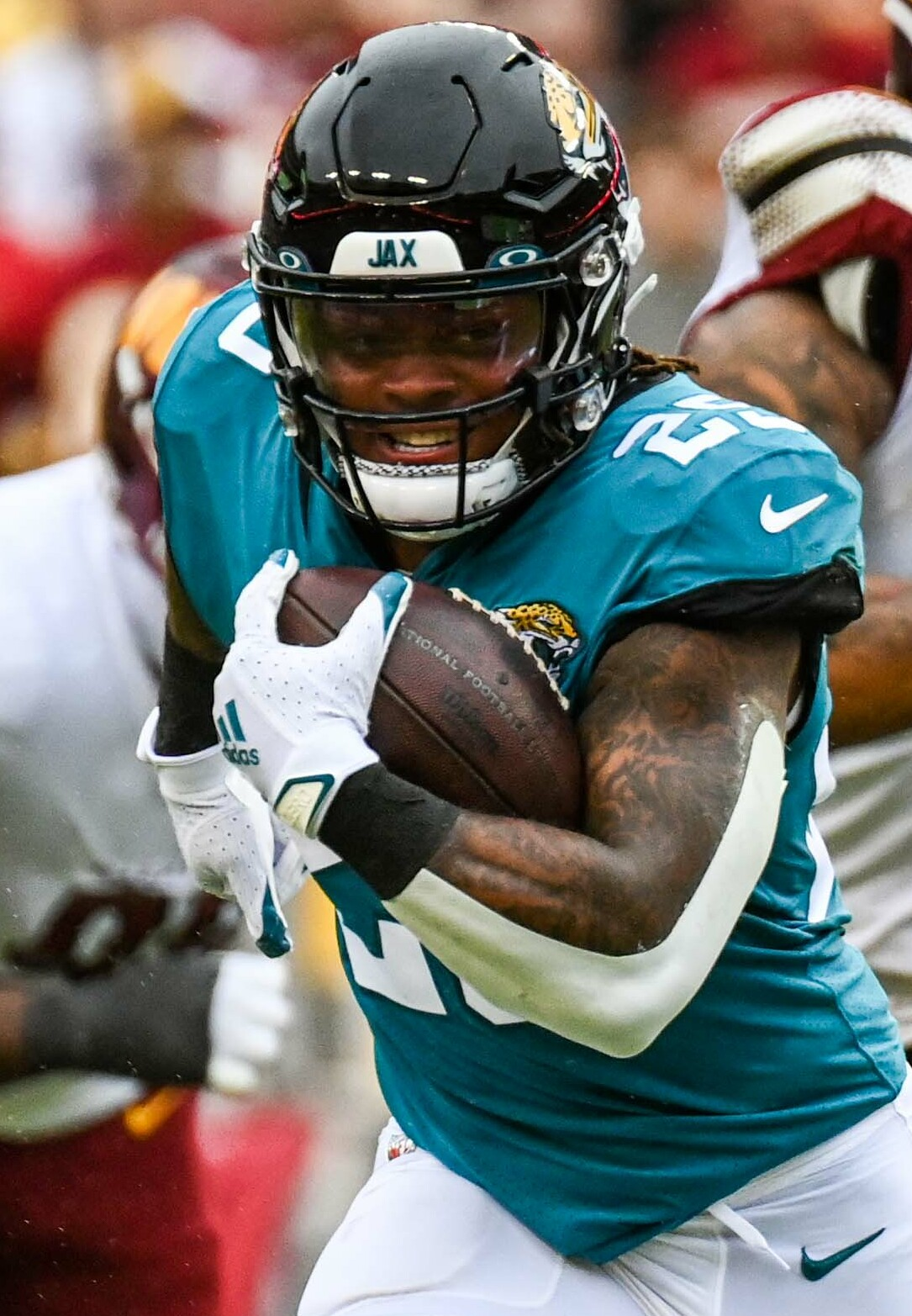
James Robinson

- John Blake, nose guard, coach, University of Oklahoma, Dallas Cowboys
- Merwin Hodel, fullback, New York Giants
- Jerry Latin, halfback, St Louis Cardinals
- Vederian Lowe, fullback, San Francisco 49ers
- Dean Lowry, defensive tackle, Pittsburgh Steelers
- Ira Matthews, halfback, Oakland Raiders
- Walt McGaw, guard, Green Bay Packers
- Carlos Polk, linebacker, Dallas Cowboys
- James Robinson, running back, former NFL player
- Ken Roskie, fullback, Green Bay Packers, Detroit Lions
- Brock Spack, head coach, Illinois State University
- Jerry Stalcup, linebacker, Los Angeles Rams

=== Golf ===
- Dave Barclay, golfer, 1947 national collegiate champion
- Jeff Mitchell, pro golfer

=== Ice skating ===
- Alexe Gilles, champion figure skater
- Janet Lynn Nowicki, ice skater, 5-time national champion, 1972 Olympic bronze medalist
- Piper Gilles, Olympic figure skater

=== Mixed martial arts ===
- Corey Anderson, mixed martial artist
- Daniel Roberts, mixed martial artist

=== Motor racing ===
- Chad Knaus, crew chief, Jimmie Johnson, seven-time NASCAR Sprint Cup Series champion

=== Mountaineering ===
- Ed Viesturs, high-altitude mountaineer

=== Soccer ===
- Steve Cherundolo, defender who represented the United States national team and coach
- Peri Marosevic, forward for the Toronto FC
- Bryan Namoff, defender and midfielder for D.C. United
- Brad Ring, midfielder for the San Jose Earthquakes (2008-2013), midfielder for the Indy Eleven (2013-2018)
- R. T. Moore, defender for the Tampa Bay Mutiny (1998-1999)
- Tim Trilk, soccer goalkeeper

=== Wrestling ===
- Stephanie Bellars, wrestling manager; married to Paul Caiafa of the Misfits
