= Louella Daetweiler =

American baseball player

- Catcher
- Born: April 30, 1918; Lynwood, California, U.S.
- Died: August 22, 2004 (aged 86); Long Beach, California, U.S.
- Batted: Right Threw: Right

Teams
- Rockford Peaches (1944)

Career highlights and awards
- Women in Baseball – AAGPBL Permanent Display at Baseball Hall of Fame and Museum (1988)

Louella M. Daetweiler (April 30, 1918 – August 22, 2004) was a catcher who played in the All-American Girls Professional Baseball League (AAGPBL). Listed at 5' 3", 160 lb., she batted and threw right handed.

== Biography ==
Born in Lynwood, California, Daetweiler graduated from Compton College, where she was a member of the basketball and field hockey teams. She also played organized softball in several years before joining the league for the 1944 season.

Daetweiler played 33 games for the Rockford Peaches, serving as a backup to Peaches incumbent catcher Dorothy Green and coming off the bench as pinch hitter. ״Daets״, as her teammates called her, also worked as a chaperone for the team during her only season in the league.

After baseball, she coached and officiated for 39 years at Compton College.

== Recognition ==
In 1988, Louella received further recognition when she became part of Women in Baseball, a permanent display based at the Baseball Hall of Fame and Museum in Cooperstown, New York, which was unveiled to honor the entire All-American Girls Professional Baseball League.

== Death ==
Daetweiler was a longtime resident of Long Beach, California, where she died at the age of 86.

== Career statistics ==
Batting

| GP | AB | R | H | 2B | 3B | HR | RBI | SB | TB | BB | SO | BA | OBP | SLG |
|---|---|---|---|---|---|---|---|---|---|---|---|---|---|---|
| 33 | 76 | 4 | 6 | 0 | 0 | 0 | 8 | 4 | 6 | 6 | 5 | .079 | .146 | .079 |

Fielding

| GP | PO | A | E | TC | DP | FA |
|---|---|---|---|---|---|---|
| 19 | 38 | 7 | 12 | 57 | 0 | .789 |
