= Jean Cione =

- Pitcher / First base / Outfield
- Born: June 23, 1928; Rockford, Illinois, U.S.
- Died: November 22, 2010 (aged 82); Bozeman, Montana, U.S.
- Batted: Left Threw: Left

debut
- 1945

Last appearance
- 1954

Teams
- Rockford Peaches (1945, 1947, 1954); Peoria Redwings (1946); Kenosha Comets (1948–1951); Battle Creek Belles (1952); Muskegon Belles (1953)

Career highlights and awards
- All-Star Team (1952); Championship team (1945); Four playoff appearances (1945, 1948, 1949–1950); Hurled two no-hitters; Turned an unassisted triple play; Women in Baseball – AAGPBL Permanent Display Baseball Hall of Fame and Museum (1988)

Jean S. Cione [″Cy″] (June 23, 1928 – November 22, 2010) was a pitcher who played from 1945 through 1954 in the All-American Girls Professional Baseball League (AAGPBL). Listed at 5' 8", 143 lb., she batted and threw left-handed.

== Brief profile ==
Born in Rockford, Illinois, Jean Cione was a dominant lefty pitcher who enjoyed a prolific career over ten seasons in the All-American Girls Professional Baseball League. Cione is regarded one of the few pitchers to make the successful transition from underhand to overhand through the many stages of the league, although she hurled on awful expansion teams that did not give her much run support. An All-Star, she posted a 76–65 record with a 2.33 earned run average in 169 career games and pitched two no-hitters in the same month. In addition, she was a member of a champion team and turned in an unassisted triple play. After the league folded in 1954, Cione taught sports medicine and physical education at the university level for 29 years, earning inductions into several halls of fame across the United States.

== Early years ==
Cione attended grades 1–12 in the Rockford Public School System, where she graduated in 1946. At school she used to play softball. Cione later worked at J. L. Clarke, where she played on the company's girls team. She also taught herself the accordion, after being motivated by the piano music of Frankie Carle.

As she grew up, Cione showed an intense interest in athletics and outdoor activities, developing a practice that was to continue throughout the rest of her life. When she turned seventeen, she attended an All-American Girls Professional Baseball League tryout held at Racine under the direction of Max Carey. She passed the test and was offered a contract to play in the league.

== AAGPBL career ==
Cione entered the AAGPBL in 1945 with the Rockford Peaches, a team based in her hometown of Rockford which was managed by Bill Allington. Five other teams competed in the 110–game regular season: the Fort Wayne Daisies, the Grand Rapids Chicks, the Kenosha Comets, the Racine Belles, and the South Bend Blue Sox.

The 1945 Peaches roster featured a perfect mix of experience and motivated young players, such as Mildred Deegan (2B), Dorothy Ferguson (3B), Rose Gacioch (P/OF), Dorothy Green (C), Dorothy Harrell (SS), Dorothy Kamenshek (1B), Josephine Lenard (OF), Olive Little (P), Carolyn Morris (P) and Margaret Wigiser (OF). Cione was used as a reserve first sacker for Kamenshek. Eventually, she pitched and played at outfield.

Rockford took the AAGPBL pennant with a 67–43 record, surpassing Fort Wayne (62–47), Grand Rapids (60–50), Racine (50–60), South Bend (49–60) and Kenosha (41–69). In the best-of-five series playoffs, runner-up Fort Wayne defeated fourth-place Racine in four games; first-place Rockford eliminated third-place Grand Rapids in four games, and Rockford won the league championship by beating Fort Wayne in five games.

The Muskegon Lassies and Peoria Redwings were added as expansion teams for the 1946 season. Cione was sent to the Redwings, as the AAGPBL shifted players as needed to help new teams stay afloat. In 1947 she returned to Rockford. It was clear she was back where she belonged.

By April 1947, all of the league's players were flown to Havana, Cuba for spring training. That year, Cione responded by winning 19 games for the Peaches while posting a stingy 1.30 ERA in her first full pitching season. Besides Cione, the roster of the Peaches included top notch veterans such as Deegan, Ferguson, Gacioch, Green, Harrell and Kamenshek, as well as the newly arrived Lois Florreich (P) and Alice Pollitt (3B). Unfortunately, Rockford finished in sixth place with a 48–63 mark, out of contention. During the postseason, Grand Rapids defeated South Bend in five games while Racine ousted Muskegon in four games. In the final Series, Grand Rapids disposed of Racine in seven games.

The next year Cione then found herself on the move again, this time to Kenosha (1948–1951), and then the Battle Creek Belles (1952) and Muskegon Belles (1953), before returning to Rockford in the league's final year (1954). Her most productive season came in 1950, when she won 18 games and hurled a pair of no-hitters in August: a 12–inning game against Grand Rapids and a seven-inning game against her former Rockford teammates. In 1952 she went 2–5, but sported a 3.24 ERA and made the All-Star team.

In between seasons, Cione graduated from high school and went on to study at Eastern Michigan University, University of Illinois and University of Michigan.

== Career statistics ==
Pitching

GP	W	L	W-L%	ERA	IP	H	RA	ER	BB	SO	WHIP
169	75	65	.536	2.31	1195	852	461	307	460	411	1.10

Batting

GP	AB	R	H	2B	3B	HR	RBI	SB	TB	BB	SO	BA	OBP	SLG
758	2447	240	548	67	27	8	247	86	693	232	299	.224	.291	.283

Fielding

GP	PO	A	E	TC	DP	FA
758	4163	593	148	4904	153	.979

== Life after baseball ==
Following her baseball retirement, Cione received a bachelor's degree from Eastern Michigan University before earning her master's degree at the University of Illinois. From there, Cione took up teaching physical education in elementary school for a decade and then returned to EMU, where she taught sports medicine for nearly three decades. She was EMU's first women's athletic director as her alma mater established a women's athletic program, attaining gender equity in the sports programs there.

== Honors and awards ==
Jean Cione is part of Women in Baseball, a permanent display based at the Baseball Hall of Fame and Museum in Cooperstown, New York. The exhibition was unveiled on November 5, 1988, to honor the entire All-American Girls Professional Baseball League rather than individual baseball personalities. She gained inductions into the Eastern Michigan University Athletic Hall of Fame (1986) and the National Italian American Sports Hall of Fame (2003), and also served as vice president of the AAGPBL Players Association while supervising the organization's website.

== A League of Their Own ==
The All-American Girls Professional Baseball League folded in 1954. Lady pitchers, catchers, and fielders drifted into obscurity until 1992 when the film A League of Their Own was released. The film kindled a renewed interest in these trailblazers who have their own places in American history. While the film does not use real names, filmmaker Penny Marshall seemed to be aiming for realism, as her work includes fake newsreel footage and pseudo-documentary present day scenes at the beginning and end of the fictitious story. Since then, Cione and her teammates have become the darlings of the media. They have been honored several times for their significant contributions, responding to requests for autographs and corresponding with young athletes interested in hearing of their days in the AAGPBL.

Jean Cione died at the age of 82 in Bozeman, Montana, where she had moved after retiring in 1992.

2026-03-04.
