= Dottie Hunter =

Canadian baseball player

- First base / Chaperone
- Born: January 28, 1916; Winnipeg, Manitoba, Canada
- Died: August 17, 2005 (aged 89); Winnipeg, Manitoba, Canada
- Batted: Right Threw: Right

debut
- 1943

Last appearance
- 1954

Teams
- Racine Belles (first base, 1943); Milwaukee Chicks (chaperone, 1944); Grand Rapids Chicks (chaperone, 1945–'54)

Career highlights and awards
- Four-time Championship Team (1943-'44, 1947, 1953); Fourteen playoffs appearances (1943-'54); Only girl to participate in the playoffs every year; One of three girls to participate in all 12 seasons; Canadian Baseball Hall of Fame Induction (1998); Manitoba Baseball Hall of Fame Induction (1998)

Dorothy Hunter (January 28, 1916 – August 17, 2005) was a Canadian first basewoman who played in the All-American Girls Professional Baseball League (AAGPBL) during the 1943 season. A member of several halls of fame, Hunter was one of 68 players from Canada to participate in the extinct All-American Girls Professional Baseball League.

== Early life ==
Hunter was born in Winnipeg, Manitoba, Canada. She grew up in a home where sports were considered of vital importance, as her father was a prominent soccer player and coach. She started playing playground games, and played whatever sport the boys were playing, baseball, softball or basketball. There were no teams for girls and the boys would let her play with them.

Finally, only 280 girls were invited to the final try-outs at Wrigley Field in Chicago, where 60 survived the final cut. Enticed with salaries ranging from $55 to $150 per week, the initial group of women would form four teams – the Racine Belles, Kenosha Comets, Rockford Peaches, and South Bend Blue Sox – for the league's inaugural campaign. Each team consisted of 15 players. Hunter survived the last cut and was assigned to the Racine squad, becoming one of the oldest players to enter the league at 27.

== AAGPBL career ==
Listed at 5 feet 6 inches (168 cm), Hunter batted and threw right-handed. She started 1943 with the Belles as their regular first sacker. She hit .224 in 80 games and helped Racine win a pennant and championship in the AAGPBL's first-ever season. After that she became a chaperone for the expansion Chicks, first at Milwaukee (1944) and later in Grand Rapids (1945-'54), until the league folded following the 1954 season. Hunter enjoyed continued success following each move, becoming the only girl in AAGPBL history to participate in the playoffs every year, including four Championship Titles. She also was one of three girls, along with Dottie Green (catcher/chaperone) and Dorothy Schroeder (infielder), to participate in all 12 seasons for the league.

== Statistics ==
=== Batting ===
GP	AB	R	H	2B	3B	HR	RBI	SB	BB	SO	BA	OBP	SLG
82	254	27	57	6	5	1	28	9	16	18	.224	.270	.299

=== Fielding ===
PO	A	E	TC	DP	FA
736	15	21	772	16	.973

== Milestones ==
On November 5, 1988, Hunter was honored with the rest of the All-American Girls Professional Baseball League during the opening of a permanent display at the Baseball Hall of Fame and Museum in Cooperstown, New York. In 1998, she and another 10 girls from Manitoba who played in the AAGPBL were inducted into the Canadian Baseball Hall of Fame and the Manitoba Baseball Hall of Fame.

Hunter died at a nursing home in Manitoba at the age of 89.
