= Bunton =

Bunton is a surname. People with the name include:

- Cleaver Bunton (1902–1999), mayor of Albury, New South Wales, Australia
- Emma Bunton (born 1976), English pop singer and songwriter
- Hanna Bunton (born 1995), Canadian ice hockey forward
- Haydn Bunton, Jr. (born 1937), player and coach of Australian rules football
- Haydn Bunton, Sr. (1911–1955), Australian rules football player
- Jacob Bunton, an American musician (Lynam, Mars Electric, Adler)
- Kempton Bunton (1904–1976), who stole a painting from the National Gallery, London
- Lorraine Bunton, All-American Girls Professional Baseball League player
