= Arthur Shepherd =

American composer and conductor

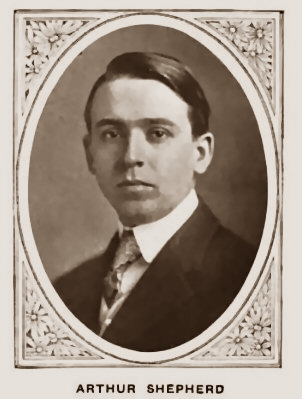
- Burr McIntosh Monthly, September, 1908
- Born: February 19, 1880; Paris, Idaho, USA
- Died: January 12, 1958 (aged 77); Cleveland, Ohio, USA
- Occupations: Composer, Orchestra Conductor and Professor of Music

Arthur Shepherd (February 19, 1880 – January 12, 1958) was an American composer and conductor in the 20th century.

== Life and career ==
Shepherd was born in Paris, Idaho, into a Mormon family. His family loved to sing and his father, William N. B. Shepherd, wrote the hymn “Give Us Room That We May Dwell.” Shepherd performed with both the Paris Brass Band and the Bear Lake Stake Choir.

Shepherd entered the New England Conservatory when he was only twelve years old. After graduating with honors and as president of his class, Shepherd returned to his family who had moved to Salt Lake City, Utah, and led a local orchestra for six years. In 1901, he married Hattie Hooper Jennings.

After some encouragement, he returned to the east and took a teaching position at the New England Conservatory where he studied under Charles F. Dennée, Percy Goetschius, Carl Faelten, and George W. Chadwick. He briefly served as a bandmaster during World War I. His marriage fell apart after his return from Europe and he moved with his children to Cleveland, Ohio. He took a job as the assistant director of the Cleveland Orchestra.

In 1922 he married Grazella Shepherd.

In 1927 he returned to teaching at the Western Reserve University in Cleveland. He retired in 1950 and died in 1958, after a failed operation at a Cleveland hospital. He composed over 100 works, including symphonies, string quartets and songs.

Shepherd was a Latter-day Saint. Although around the time of World War I, his divorce and remarriage, he distanced himself from the faith, he maintained a faith in God and his connections to the church and his people. His work made reference to the geography and music of the Latter-day Saints.

== Awards ==
- 1905 Paderewski Prize for Overture Joyeuse (orchestral work performed by the New York Symphony conducted by Walter Damrosch
- 1909 First prize in the National Federal of Music Clubs for Sonata for the Pianoforte

== Works ==
- 1904 Capriccio (for piano)
- 1904 Etude (for piano)
- 1905 Overture Joyeuse
- 1907 The Lord Hath Brought Again Zion (choral work with text from Doctrine and Covenants)
- 1909 Five Songs on Poems by James Russell Lowell
- 1909 Sonata for the Pianoforte
- 1913 The City in the Sea (cantata)
- 1927 Horizons (symphony)

== Influences ==
His influences include Percy Goetschius and George W. Chadwick, Arthur Farwell, French Impressionists and Englishman, Vaughan Williams.

== Selected works ==
- Ouverture Joyeuse
- Horizons
- Triptych
- Piano Quintet
- Matin Song
- He Came All So Still
- The Lost Child
- Nocturn
- Solitude
- Where Loveliness Keeps House
- Two-Step
- Exotic Dance No. 1
- From a Mountain lake
- Gigue Fantasque
