= Hazel Measner =

Canadian baseball player

- Pitcher
- Born: June 2, 1925; Holdfast, Saskatchewan, Canada
- Died: January 1, 1984 (aged 58); Holdfast, Saskatchewan, Canada
- Batted: Right Threw: Right

Teams
- Rockford Peaches (1946)

Hazel Measner (later Wildfong; June 2, 1925 – January 1, 1984) was a Canadian pitcher who played in the All-American Girls Professional Baseball League (AAGPBL).

== Career ==
The Holdfast, Saskatchewan-born Measner was one of 68 players born in Canada to join the All American League in its twelve years history. Measner was assigned to the Rockford Peaches club in its 1946 season. She went hitless in one at bat and did not have a pitching record. Hazel Measner later married Vernon Wildfong (February 16, 1924 – October 9, 1998), who survived her.

In 1988 was inaugurated a permanent display at the Baseball Hall of Fame and Museum in Cooperstown, New York that honors those who were part of the All-American Girls Professional Baseball League. Hazel Measner, along with the rest of the girls and the league staff, is included at the display/exhibit. Then in 1998, Hazel and all Canadian AAGPBL players gained honorary induction into the Canadian Baseball Hall of Fame.
