= Scipione Guidi =

Italian violinist (1884–1966)

Scipione Guidi (Venice, July 17, 1884 - Los Angeles, July 7, 1966) was an Italian violinist and concertmaster of the National Symphony Orchestra and the New York Philharmonic under the direction of Willem Mengelberg and Arturo Toscanini during the 1920s.

== Biography ==
Guidi studied at the Milan Conservatory, where he later became a teacher. He moved to London where he formed the Trio Guidi and later moved to New York.

His career was predominantly as a first violin. From 1919 to 1921 he was the first violin of the National Symphony Orchestra of New York, which was absorbed by the New York Philharmonic in 1921. Unlike many National Symphony musicians, who were not retained, Guidi was named the first violin of the New York Philharmonic. In 1919 he formed the New York Trio, with pianist Clarence Adler (father of Richard Adler) and Cornelius van Vliet at the cello, but left this group in 1923 due to the growing commitment with the orchestra. As a member of the Longo Trio in 1920, he collaborated with Nicholas Laucella in a recording of several popular songs including: The Meeting of the Waters and Believe Me if All Those Endearing Young Charms by Thomas Moore (Pathe, 22353).

External audio
- You may hear Scipione Guidi performing the aria "Ein Heldenleben" with Willem Mengelberg conducting the Philharmonic symphony Orchestra of New York in 1928 Here on archive.org
- You may hear Guidi performing Richard Wagner's "Siegfried" - Forest Murmurs (Waldweben) with the Philharmonic Symphony Orchestra of New York conducted by Willem Mengelberg in 1958 Here on archive.org

He remained in the first violin of the New York Philharmonic for a decade, from 1921 to 1931, under the direction, among others, of Willem Mengelberg and Arturo Toscanini. During this period, the philharmonic merged with the New York Symphony and the name of the orchestra passed from the Philharmonic Society of New York to the Philharmonic-Symphony Society of New York. During all these changes Scipione Guidi continued to lead the orchestra as the first violin. He appeared as a soloist for at least 12 times playing great solo repertoire (Bruch: Scottish Fantasy, Beethoven: Triple Concert and Concerto for Violin, Saint-Saens: 3rd Concerto for violin, Bach: Concerto for 2 violins, Mendelssohn: Concerto for violin, Brahms: Double concert (with Cornelius van Vliet)). He also gave solo recitals accompanied by pianist Alice Marion Shaw.

As a member of the Philharmonic String Quartet, Scipione also collaborated with Arthur Lichstein, Louis Barzin and Osvaldo Mazzuchi in recordings of Robert Schumann's Quintette in E Flat Major and Antonin Dvorak's Quartet in F Major (American) on the Edison label in 1927 and 1928.

One of his famous performances was between December 11 and 13, 1928, in the recording of Richard Strauss's Ein Heldenleben, with the great French hornist Bruno Jaenicke under the direction of Willem Mengelberg which was released on the Victor label (Victor, 6909, 6982). In 1931, Guidi left the New York Philharmonic to move to St. Louis, where he was named first violin by Saint Louis Symphony by Vladimir Golschmann.

Guidi later moved to Los Angeles, where he became a successful musician in the orchestras of Hollywood studios. He recorded with, among others, singer Bing Crosby. He was also director and soloist of Glendale Symphony. He died in Los Angeles, California, July 7, 1966.

Several of Scipione Guidi's recordings have been archived at the Discography of American Historical Recordings.
