= Donna Jogerst =

American baseball player

- Pitcher
- Born: September 11, 1932; Freeport, Illinois, U.S.
- Died: October 17, 2000 (aged 68); Freeport, Illinois, U.S.
- Batted: Left Threw: Left

Teams
- Rockford Peaches (1952)

Career highlights and awards
- Women in Baseball – AAGPBL Permanent Display at the Baseball Hall of Fame and Museum (since 1988)

Donna Mae Jogerst (September 11, 1932 – October 17, 2000) was an American left-handed pitcher who played in the All-American Girls Professional Baseball League (AAGPBL).

Born in Freeport, Illinois, Jogerst saw little action with the Rockford Peaches in its 1952 season, pitching one inning of relief during her only game in the league.

The All-American Girls Professional Baseball League folded in 1954, but there is now a permanent display at the Baseball Hall of Fame and Museum at Cooperstown, New York, since November 5, 1988, that honors those who were part of the league. Donna Mae, along with the rest of the girls and the league staff, is included at the display/exhibit.
