= Cartha Doyle =

American baseball player

- Second base
- Born: October 12, 1929 (age 96); Knoxville, Tennessee, U.S.
- Bats: Right Throws: Right

Teams
- Rockford Peaches (1947)

Career highlights and awards
- Women in Baseball – AAGPBL Permanent Display at Baseball Hall of Fame and Museum (1988)

Cartha Doyle (later Childress) (born October 12, 1929) is a former infielder who played in the All-American Girls Professional Baseball League (AAGPBL). Listed at 5' 5", 130 lb., she batted and threw right handed. Doyle saw limited action at second base during her only season in the league.

== Biography ==
Born in Knoxville, Tennessee, Doyle attended Young High School in South Knoxville, where she was a member of the basketball squad in her senior year. She also played basketball and softball in the city league, and was convinced by AAGPBL player Doris Sams to join the league while still in high school. Doyle made a tryout, and later became one of two hundred players to attend the first AAGPBL spring training outside the United States, which was held in Cuba at Gran Stadium de La Habana before the 1947 season. She made the grade and was assigned to the Rockford Peaches.

The 17-year-old played briefly for the Peaches, where she earned the nickname ″Duckie″ (a shortening of duck soup), which players got called when they were an easy out as a batter. At the end of the season she married Albert Lee Childress and decided not to go back to the league the following season. Instead, Doyle played softball in her hometown until 1967. After that she coached and umpired for a long time, retiring in 1982. She developed arthritis in both knees and had knee replacement surgery. Meanwhile, she gave birth to one daughter, Janet, and helped her husband run a family business. She was widowed in 1975.

Doyle received further recognition in 1988 when she became part of Women in Baseball, a permanent display based at the Baseball Hall of Fame and Museum in Cooperstown, New York, which was unveiled to honor the entire All-American Girls Professional Baseball League. She also was inducted into the Knoxville Sports Hall of Fame in 1990. As of 2025, she lives in Maryville, Tennessee.

== Career statistics ==
Batting

GP	AB	R	H	2B	3B	HR	RBI	SB	TB	BB	SO	BA	OBP	SLG	OPS
59	166	5	28	4	0	0	7	2	32	5	24	.169	.193	.193	.386

Fielding

GP	PO	A	E	TC	DP	FA
46	74	97	9	180	7	.950
