= Thelma Golden (softball) =

Canadian softball player

- Pitcher
- Born: October 8, 1913; Toronto, Ontario, Canada
- Died: July 18, 1980 (aged 66); Toronto, Ontario, Canada
- Batted: Right Threw: Right

Teams
- Rockford Peaches (1943)

Career highlights and awards
- Women in Baseball – AAGPBL Permanent Display at the Baseball Hall of Fame and Museum (unveiled in 1988)

Thelma Fidler Golden (October 8, 1913 – July 18, 1980) was a Canadian fastpitch softball pitcher. She batted and threw right handed.

Born in Toronto, Ontario, she was the daughter of Theodore and Rosana Fidler. The family immigrated to the United States in 1925, but Thelma later returned to Canada. Thelma Golden was dubbed the 'strike-out queen' of Toronto amateur softball between the late 1930s and early 1940s. Golden began her career in 1928 and by 1931 was already considered a top notch player. By then, she pitched for the Toronto Nationals of the Sunnyside Ladies Softball League.

In 1943, Golden auditioned for the All-American Girls Professional Baseball League at Wrigley Field and she signed a contract to play in the league's inaugural season. She was assigned to the Rockford Peaches, but after ending spring training, she decided to return to Canada instead.

Golden explained to a local news reporter that an injury she had sustained a few years before made the AAGPBL schedule too strenuous for her. Golden added that she suffered an injury that ripped all the muscles around her ribs, and consequently she has had to space her pitching duties.

Afterwards, Golden continued her amateur career in Canada and pitched for the Montreal Royals in 1943, before returning to the Toronto Nationals for the next five seasons. She then went into hospital for surgery on her back. As a result, she spent a long period of time recovering and opted to retire from playing the game at a competitive level. She completed a 22-year career and did play at least one exhibition game in 1950 to raise money for injured players.

She died in Toronto on July 18, 1980, at the age of 65.

In 1988, permanent display at the Baseball Hall of Fame and Museum at Cooperstown, New York, was inaugurated that honors those who were part of the All-American Girls Professional Baseball League. The AAGPBL Players Association list also recognized players who signed contracts, but may not have played a game during their career. Eight years after her death, Thelma Golden, along with the rest of the girls and the league staff, was included at the display/exhibit.
