= Betty Yahr =

American baseball player (1923–2010)

- Right fielder
- Born: April 22, 1923; Ann Arbor, Michigan, U.S.
- Died: December 30, 2010 (aged 87)
- Batted: Left Threw: Right

Teams
- Rockford Peaches (1946)

Career highlights and awards
- Women in Baseball – AAGPBL Permanent Display at Baseball Hall of Fame and Museum (1988)

Betty Yahr (April 22, 1923 – December 30, 2010) was an American baseball player who was a right fielder in the All-American Girls Professional Baseball League (AAGPBL). She played for the Rockford Peaches in 1946, hitting .171 with no home runs and eight RBI in 22 games.

Yahr was born in Ann Arbor, Michigan and later attended Ann Arbor High School.
