= Dorothy Cramer =

Dorothy Cramer was an All-American Girls Professional Baseball League player.

Cramer appears as a member of the Rockford Peaches club during its 1951 season. Nevertheless, she did not have individual records or some information was incomplete.

The AAGPBL folded in 1954, but there is a permanent display at the Baseball Hall of Fame and Museum at Cooperstown, New York, since November 5, 1988, that honors the entire league rather than any individual figure.
