= Carrie Burpee Shaw =

American musician and music educator

- Born: Mary Caroline Burpee Shaw; 1850; Rockland, Maine, U.S.
- Died: 1946 (aged 95–96)
- Occupations: Composer; music educator; pianist; organist
- Organization: Rockland Rubenstein Club
- Known for: Rockland Music School
- Style: Classical; choral
- Spouse: Reverend Eurastus Melville Shaw (m. 1873)
- Children: 3, including Alice Marion Shaw
- Musical career
- Publishers: C. W. Thompson & Company

Mary Caroline "Carrie" Burpee Shaw (1850–1946) was an American composer, music educator, and pianist. She published her music under the name Carrie Burpee Shaw.

Shaw was born in Rockland, Maine, to Mary Jane Partridge and Nathaniel Adams Burpee. Her brother was the marine impressionist painter William Partridge Burpee. Shaw married Reverend Eurastus Melville Shaw in 1873 and they had three children: Winifred May, Louis Eaton, and Alice Marion Shaw, also a composer.

Shaw studied piano and organ with Stephen Emery, Percy Goetschius, Hermann Kotschmann, Frederic Lamond, Benjamin Johnson Lang, Effa Ellis Perfield, Thomas Tapper, and Antha Minerva Virgil. She worked as an organist in several different churches. In 1873, Shaw founded the Rockland Rubenstein Club. In 1900, she and Mrs. James Wright opened the Rockland Music School. In 1907, Shaw accompanied the Maine Festival Chorus. She donated her music collection to the Rockland Public Library in 1942.

Shaw's music was published by C. W. Thompson & Company. Her compositions include some instrumental works as well as the following compositions for voice and piano:

- "All is O'er"
- "Dandelions" (text by Winnifred Fales)
- Field Sparrow (women's chorus)
- Humpty-Dumpty (mixed chorus)
- "My Sunshine"
- Prairie Dog (men's chorus; text by Winnifred Fales)
- Te Deum Laudamus (mixed chorus)
- The Lord is Great in Zion (mixed chorus)
- There was a Little Man (mixed chorus)
