= Marjorie Hood =

American baseball player (1913–2006)

- Born: September 14, 1913; Bell Buckle, Tennessee, U.S.
- Died: June 25, 2006 (aged 92); Chattanooga, Tennessee, U.S.

Teams
- Rockford Peaches (1943); South Bend Blue Sox (1943)

Career highlights and awards
- Women in Baseball – AAGPBL Permanent Display at the Baseball Hall of Fame and Museum (unveiled in 1988)

Marjorie Hood (September 14, 1913 – June 25, 2006) was an All-American Girls Professional Baseball League player.

According to All-American League data, Hood, a native of Bell Buckle, Tennessee, played at outfield for the Rockford Peaches and South Bend Blue Sox clubs in the 1943 season. Additional information is incomplete because there are no records available at the time of the request.

The All-American Girls Professional Baseball League folded in 1954, but there is a permanent display at the Baseball Hall of Fame and Museum at Cooperstown, New York, since 1988 that honors the entire league rather than any individual figure.
