= Lora Aborn =

American composer (1907–2005)

Lora Aborn Busck (May 30, 1907 – August 25, 2005) was an American composer.

== Biography ==
Lora Aborn was born in New York City and began studying piano, music theory and composition at the Effa Ellis Perfield School of Music. She continued studying piano and voice in California and played in a jazz band. She attended Oberlin Conservatory where she studied composition under Dr. George W. Andrews.

Aborn continued her studies at the American Conservatory in Chicago under John Palmer and was awarded a gold medal for composition at graduation. She composed a number of commissioned works, and her music has been played and recorded in the United States, China and Europe. She was honored in a list of top American women composers.

For many years, Aborn was the organist, director of music and composer-in-residence at the Unitarian Universalist Church, Frank Lloyd Wright’s Unity Temple. She married Harry Busck, an antiquarian book seller who died in 1999, and had two daughters. Aborn died August 25, 2005, in Chicago.

A species of moth was named Lora Aborn's moth in her honor.

== Works ==
Aborn composed five full length ballets, two operas, works for chamber choir, vocal solos and choral works.

Ballet:

- American Woman
- In My Landscape
- The Lonely Ones
- Reunion
- Strange New Street
- American Ditties (Group of 4 dances)
- Boston John (Shaker)
- Casey At The Bat
- The Critic
- Hot Afternoons in Montana (Lament)
- The Lawyer
- Nostalgia
- Punch Drunk (Parade)
- Strawberry Roan

Opera:

- Gift of the Magi – 1 act
- Mitty – 1 act

Orchestra:

- Ethan Frome
- Hiawatha's Childhood
- In My Landscape
- The Mystic Trumpeter
- Reunion
- Rhapsody for Two Pianos & Orchestra
- Song of Life
- Symphony in A Minor (Birdsong Symphony)
- Tone Poem for String Orchestra

Organ (solo):

- Canons, Preludes and Fugues
- Chorale – Prelude
- Chorale and Variations
- Toccata (from Greatest of These)

Organ and other instruments:

- Such Stuff As Dreams Are Made On
- Mystic Trumpeter
- Threnody
- Ethan Frome

Piano:

- Andante Cantabile (from "Mitty")
- Cappricio Fantastico (Scherzo)
- Ditties(piano arr.of 4 dances)
- Etude I
- Etude II
- Four pieces for children
- Fugue in Blue
- Fugue in Yellow'
- In My Landscape
- Lament
- Parade (satire of French Street Band)
- Poetic music
- Sonata in E Minor
- Toccata for Piano
- Two-voice Etude
- Waltz (from American Woman)
- Waltz and Berceuse (from Reunion)
- Capriccio Fantastico
- Fugue in Yellow
- Jazz Toccata
- Waltz (a Duet from American Woman)

Choral:

- All Creatures of Our God & King (Alleluia)
- Alleluia Motet
- Bless Jehovah O My Soul
- Bow Down Thine Ear, O Lord
- Canticle of Praise
- Canticle of the Bells
- Chicago, Prairie Gem of Illinois
- Christmas Carol, The Holly & The Ivy
- Christmas Night
- Creation (Song of Life)
- Give Us New Dreams for Old
- Harp of the North (Male Chorus)
- Hiawatha's Childhood
- How Far Is It To Bethlehem
- If Ye Love Me
- In the Lonely Midnight
- Little Children, Wake & Listen
- Lo, The Day of Days is Here
- Now Wander, Sweet Mary (Wolf-Aborn arr.)
- The Glory of the Spring
- The Kings of the East
- To Music
- When The Herds Were Watching

Solo voice:

- A Good Wife (Proverbs 31)
- Alone in the Night
- American Names
- Ancient Prayer (on The Wall of an Inn)
- Apache Indian Wedding Blessing
- Awake, Awake For Night Is Flying
- Casey At The Bat
- Do Not Go Gently Into That Goodnight
- Each In His Own Tongue
- Fall Leaves Fall
- For Everything There Is a Season
- God is Our Refuge and Strength
- Great Spirit Whose Voice I Hear in the Winds
- High O'er The Lonely Hills
- Hoar Frost
- How Do I Love Thee
- I Asked The Heaven of Stars
- Influence
- Her Love Is Like An Island
- Make Me An Instrument of Thy Peace
- Miracles (Whitman)
- My Country Is The World
- My Gift
- My Shepherd is The Lord My God
- New Dreams for Old (God Who Through Ages Past)
- Night Is Come
- Night Song At Amalfi
- Nirvana
- Now That Spring is in The World (Easter Prayer)
- O Brother Man
- Once More, The Liberal Year
- Once To Every Man and Nation
- Pierrot
- Private Enterprise
- Psalms from the Pilgrim Song Book
- Romance
- Salutation of the Dawn (Look To This Day)
- Shall I Compare Thee to a Summer's Day
- Solfege In G (a memorial)
- Song of Songs (Solomon)
- Songs For Chatka – 8 Nursery Songs
- Summer Days Are Come Again
- Thank You God For This Most Amazing Day
- The Greatest of These – 3 songs from Cor 13
- The Hallowed Season
- The Prince of Peace
- The Shell
- The Waters Mid Their Lilies Slept
- There Is A Lady Sweet And Kind
- T'is Winter Now
- Today The Peace of Autumn
- Unheard, The Dews Around Me Fall
- Weep You No More, Sad Fountains
- What Tomas And Buile Said – I Saw God
