= Effa Ellis Perfield =

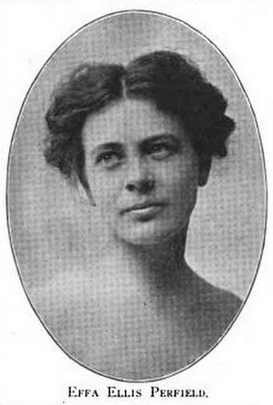
Effa Ellis Perfield, from a 1914 publication.

Effa Ellis Perfield (February 2, 1873 – December 1967) was an American educator who devised and promoted a "scientific" system for music pedagogy.

== Early life ==
Effie May Ellis was born in Little Sioux, Iowa, the daughter of Clark Ellis and Edna Hall Ellis.

== Career ==
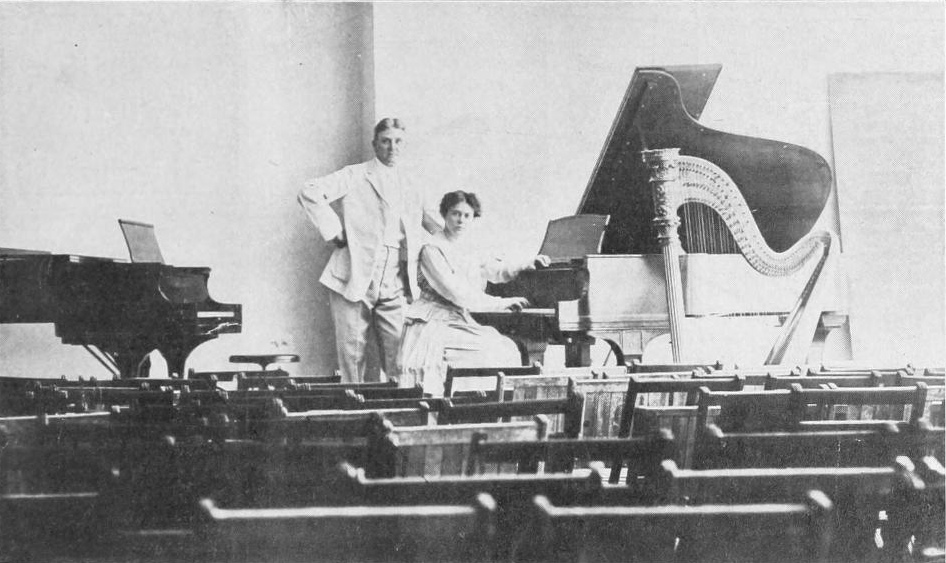
Perfield and her husband Thomas at the Effa Ellis Perfield Music School, Chicago

Effa Ellis devised the "Effa Ellis Perfield System of Teaching Keyboard Harmony and Melody", which she taught to music teachers in workshops and by correspondence courses. She taught her system in cities all over the United States, with headquarters first in Omaha, Nebraska, then in Chicago, Illinois. Her "lightning style" was considered distinctive, and she promised that "All the major chords can be taught in ten minutes. In six months, pupils can play or write in any key."

She also taught at the Orchard School of Music and Expression on Chicago's South Side. She oversaw the "Children's Constructive Music Page" feature in the Musical Monitor & World magazine in 1915. In 1922 she lectured and gave "scientific presentations" on her "Trinity Principle" of pedagogy in New York City. At its peak, the Perfield System had trained teachers who taught in many states and in Canada and China, with 2900 examination centers to maintain uniformity. She was still lecturing and traveling to demonstrate her method as late as 1949.

Publications by Perfield include Effa Ellis Perfield Teaching System, Keyboard and Written Harmony, Counterpoint, Canon, and Fugue, Constructive Music Book, Songs of Birds, Animals, and Flowers, and Paragon of Rhythmic Counting for All Rhythms.

Among Perfield's notable students were composers Lora Aborn, Carrie Burpee Shaw and June Weybright, as well as choreographer Jerome Robbins.

== Personal life ==
Effa Ellis married inventor Thomas H. Perfield. She died in 1967, aged 94 years.
