= Adeline Kerrar =

American baseball player (1924–1995)

- Infielder / catcher
- Born: August 31, 1924; Rockford, Illinois, U.S.
- Died: July 4, 1995 (aged 70); Naples, Florida, U.S.
- Batted: Both Threw: Right

Teams
- Rockford Peaches (1944)

Adeline Kerrar ("Addie") (August 31, 1924 – July 4, 1995) was an American infielder and catcher who played in the All-American Girls Professional Baseball League (AAGPBL) during the 1944 season. Listed at 5 ft 2 in (1.57 m), 130 pounds, she was a switch-hitter and threw right-handed.

A native of Milwaukee, Wisconsin, Kerrar entered the All-American Girls Professional Baseball League in 1944 with the Rockford Peaches. A versatile utility, she caught and played at shortstop and third base. She had a brief career in the league because of assorted injuries.

In one game, Kerrar scored the winning run for her team by stealing home plate, but because she was not told to steal home she was fined by Rockford's manager Jack Kloza. She connected three hits in eighteen at-bats for a .167 career average in eight games.

Following her baseball career, Kerrar went on to work as one of the first female postwomen in the United States. She later served as an area representative for the AAGPBL Players Association for a number of years.

Since 1988, Kerrar is part of Women in Baseball, a permanent display based at the Baseball Hall of Fame and Museum in Cooperstown, New York, which was unveiled to honor the entire All-American Girls Professional Baseball League rather than individual baseball personalities.

Kerrar was a long-time resident of Naples, Florida, where she died at the age of 70.
