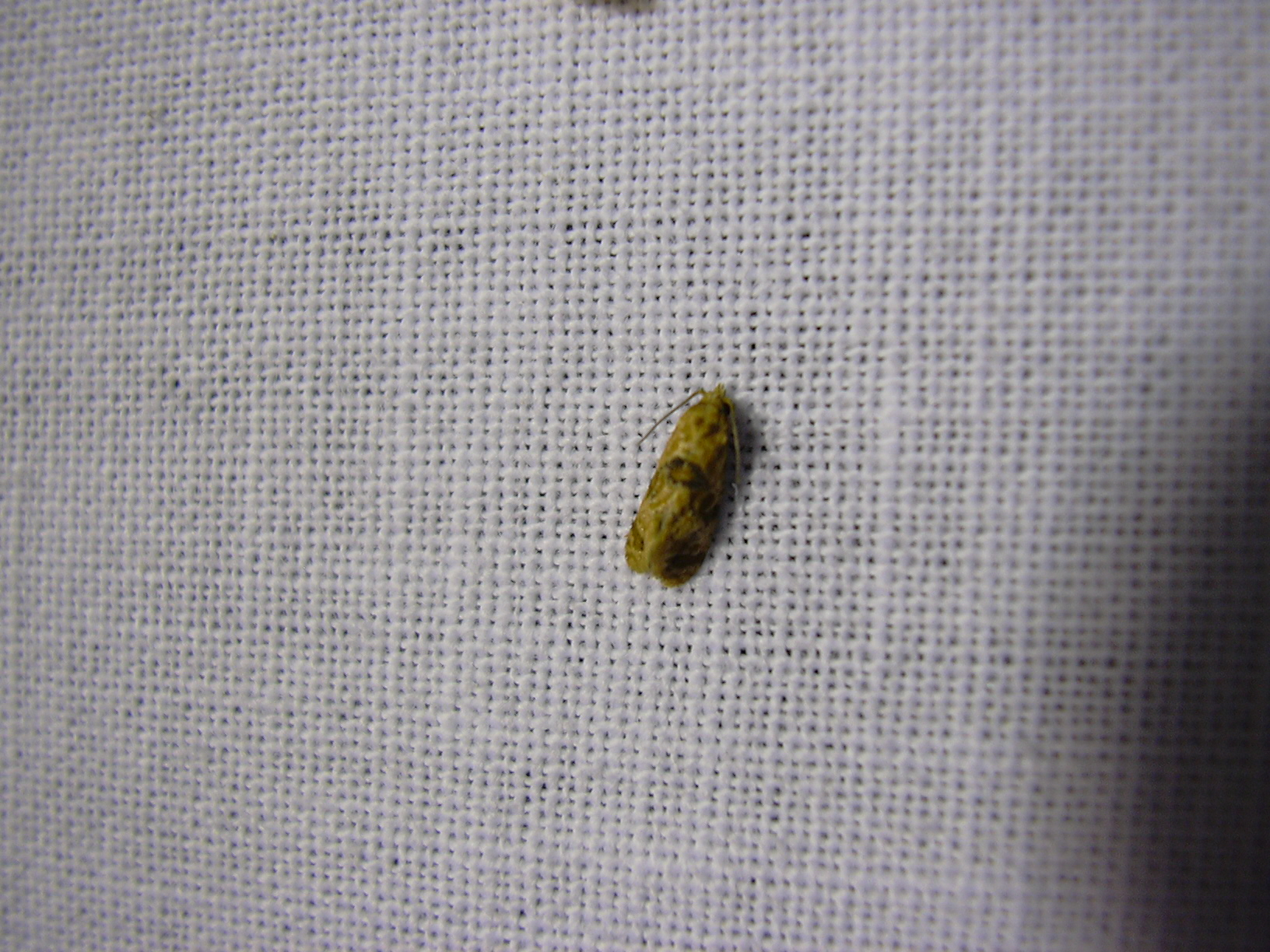

Scientific classification
- Kingdom: Animalia
- Phylum: Arthropoda
- Class: Insecta
- Order: Lepidoptera
- Family: Tortricidae
- Genus: Lorita
- Species: L. scarificata

Binomial name
- Lorita scarificata (Meyrick, 1917)

Synonyms
- Phalonia scarificata Meyrick, 1917; Lorita abornana Busck, 1939; Lorita abornana chatka Busck, 1939

= Lorita scarificata =

Species of moth

Lorita scarificata, the chrysanthemum flower borer, is a moth of the family Tortricidae. It is native to North America (where it has been recorded from Florida and California) and is an introduced species in Hawaii.

The wingspan is 10–12 mm.

The larvae have been recorded feeding on Chrysanthemum blossoms, Cuscuta californica and green bell pepper.

== Etymology ==
A synonym of Lorita scarificata, Lorita abornana, was named for composer, performer and pianist Lora Aborn.
