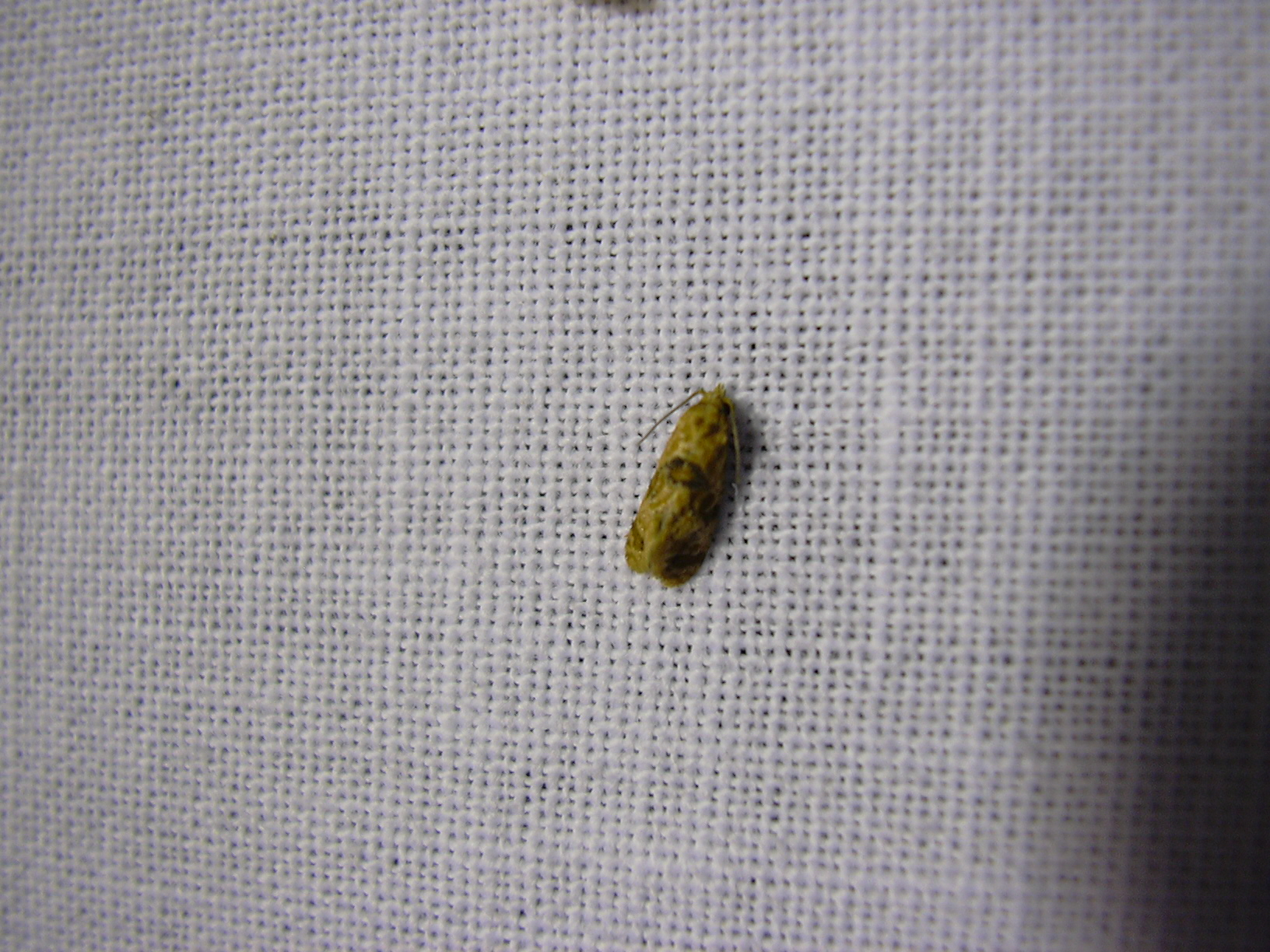
- Lorita scarificata

Scientific classification
- Kingdom: Animalia
- Phylum: Arthropoda
- Clade: Pancrustacea
- Class: Insecta
- Order: Lepidoptera
- Family: Tortricidae
- Tribe: Cochylini
- Genus: Lorita; Busck, 1939

= Lorita =

Genus of tortrix moths

Lorita is a genus of moths belonging to the subfamily Tortricinae of the family Tortricidae.

== Species ==
- Lorita baccharivora Pogue, 1988
- Lorita insulicola Razowski & Becker, 2007
- Lorita lepidulana (Forbes, 1931)
- Lorita scarificata (Meyrick, 1917)

== See also ==
- List of Tortricidae genera
