= Lorita lepidulana =

Scientific classification
- Kingdom: Animalia
- Phylum: Arthropoda
- Clade: Pancrustacea
- Class: Insecta
- Order: Lepidoptera
- Family: Tortricidae
- Genus: Lorita
- Species: L. lepidulana

Binomial name
- Lorita lepidulana (Forbes, 1931)

Synonyms
- Saphenista lepidulana Forbes, 1931

Species of moth

Lorita lepidulana is a species of moth of the family Tortricidae. It is found in Puerto Rico, Cuba and on St. Thomas in the U.S. Virgin Islands.
