= Joan Kaufman (baseball) =

American baseball player (1935–2018)

- Second base / Third base
- Born: November 9, 1935; Winnebago, Illinois, U.S.
- Died: December 30, 2018 (aged 83); San Antonio, Texas, U.S.
- Batted: Right Threw: Right

Teams
- Rockford Peaches (1954)

Career highlights and awards
- Women in Baseball – AAGPBL Permanent Display at the Baseball Hall of Fame and Museum (since 1988)

Joan Kaufman (November 9, 1935 – December 30, 2018) was an American infielder who played in the All-American Girls Professional Baseball League (AAGPBL). Listed at 5 ft 4 in and 120 lbs (1.63 m and 54 kg), Kaufman batted and threw right handed. She was dubbed "Jo" by her teammates.

Born in Winnebago, Illinois, Joan Kaufman had a chance to join the All-American Girls Professional Baseball League in its last year of operations. According to her own words, it was a lifelong dream.

Kaufman played on a girls' softball club at the age of 12. She showed her interest for baseball whenever she visited her grandmother, who lived close to the Rockford Peaches ballpark. She then began her desire to play baseball for the Peaches team when she grew up. In between, Joan played as a catcher for the Rockford Coeds when she was fifteen, mostly because the Coeds served as a Peaches farm team that utilized AAGPBL rules of play.

In 1953, Kaufman tried out for the Peaches while she was still at Winnebago High School. By then the team was already having financial issues. As a result, the Peaches told her to return the next year. After school graduation, she did that and was used by them at second base and third base throughout the 1954 season.

In a 43-game career, Kaufman posted a batting average of .134 (13-for-97) with a double and one stolen base, driving in five runs while scoring three times.

As a fielder, she hauled in 49 putouts with 77 assists and turned 12 double plays, while committing 20 errors in 146 total chances for a combined .863 fielding average.

After the league folded, Joan never received her final paycheck.

Following her baseball stint, Kaufman returned home and worked as a bookkeeper for the local lumber company and as a part-time typist before joining the United States Air Force as a personnel clerk. She then became a recruiter and later served as a USAF superintendent for military education and training, supervising over 100 instructors and 500 trainees, while serving on Southeast Asia and in Thailand during Vietnam War conflict. Moreover, her position included writing condolence letters to family members of deceased soldiers, reporting casualties and filing procedure work in support of the awards and decoration programs.

During this time, Kaufman received a bronze medal as a result of her outstanding professionalism, efficiency, and leadership skills. In addition, she earned her third Oak leaf cluster for her commendation award.

Kaufman spent 20 years in the military and retired in 1975 as a master sergeant. She chose to stay in the San Antonio, Texas area, where she bought a gift shop in 1978 and operated it for 20 years. Similarly, Kaufman obtained a license to sell life insurance in Texas, an occupation she had for many years. Severe arthritis prevented her from participating in any more sports.

In 1988, a permanent display was inaugurated for Kaufman at the Baseball Hall of Fame and Museum at Cooperstown, New York, that honors those who were part of the All-American Girls Professional Baseball League. Joan Kaufman, along with the rest of the girls and the league staff, is included at the exhibit.

Kaufman died December 30, 2018.
