= Alice Marion Shaw =

American composer, pianist, and teacher (born 1890)

- Born: August 22, 1890; Rockland, Maine, U.S.
- Education: Institute of Musical Art
- Occupations: Composer; pianist; teacher
- Employer: Rockland Music School
- Style: Classical
- Mother: Carrie Burpee Shaw
- Musical career
- Publishers: J. Fischer & Brother; Luckhardt & Belder

Alice Marion Shaw (born August 22, 1890) was an American composer, pianist, and teacher who was a well-known accompanist during the early 20th century.

Shaw was one of the three children born in Rockland, Maine, to Reverend Erastus Melville Shaw and Carrie Burpee Shaw, a composer. She studied at the Institute of Musical Art (today the Juilliard School) with Zygmunt Stojowski (piano) and Percy Goetschius (composition). She taught at the Rockland Music School, which was started by her mother, before moving to New York.

Shaw was the accompanist for the New York Rubinstein Club in 1915 and for the Maine Festival in 1916. She taught piano in New York and accompanied many notable artists, including flutist George Barrere, violinists Eddy Brown and Scipione Guidi, and singers Louis Graveure, Vernon Stiles, and Eleanor Painter Strong. She often performed the accompaniments from memory.

Shaw composed nearly 100 songs as well as music for organ, piano, cello, flute, and violin. Her music was published by J. Fischer & Brother and Luckhardt & Belder.

== Songs ==
- First Day of the Week (mixed chorus)
- "Little Man in Gray"
- "May Noon" (text by Aldrich)
- "Night"
- "Once on a Radiant Morning"
- "One April Day" (text by W. P. Gilmour)
- "Pussy-Willows" (text by Winnifred Fales)
- "Road to China" (text by Mazie V. Caruthers)
- "There is a Little Lady" (text by W. P. Gilmour)
- "To Go and Forget" (text by Edwin Markham)
- "To the Unknown"
- "Waiting" (text by Charles Hanson Towne)
