= Percy Goetschius =

American classical composer

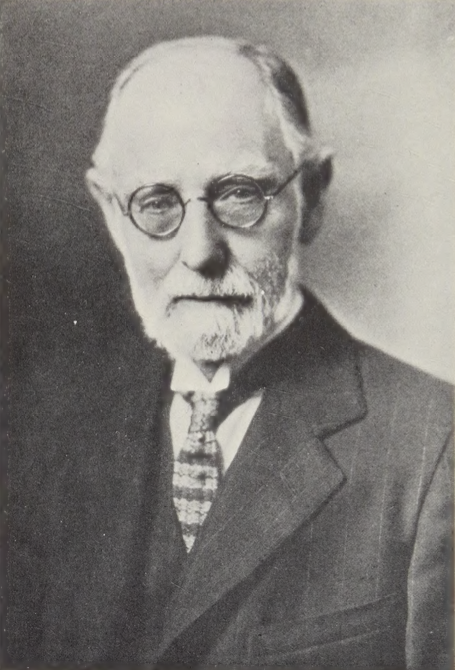
- Born: August 10, 1853; Paterson, New Jersey
- Died: October 29, 1943 (aged 90); Manchester, New Hampshire
- Occupation: Music educator
- Spouse: Maria C. C. Stephany (m. 1899)
- Children: 2

Percy Goetschius (August 10, 1853 – October 29, 1943) was an American composer, music theorist, and teacher who won international fame in the teaching of composition and music theory.

== Career ==
Goetschius was born in Paterson, New Jersey. As a youth, he was encouraged in his musical ambitions by Ureli Corelli Hill, a well-known conductor and violinist at the time, who was a friend of the Goetschius family. Young Goetschius held the positions of organist at Paterson's Second Presbyterian Church from 1868 to 1870 and at the same city's First Presbyterian Church from 1870 to 1873, as well as that of pianist to Mr. Benson's Paterson Choral Society. Although his family had intended him to become a surveyor's assistant, he went to Stuttgart, Württemberg (Germany), in 1873 to study composition and music theory at the Royal Conservatory with Immanuel Faisst, and soon advanced to become Faisst's teaching assistant and eventually a professor. In 1885, King Charles of Württemberg conferred upon him the title of Royal Professor. He composed much, and also reviewed musical performances for the Stuttgart and broader German press. Syracuse University conferred an Honorary Music Doctorate on Goetschius for the academic year 1892–1893. In 1892, he took a position in the New England Conservatory, Boston, and four years later opened a studio in that city. In 1905, he went to the staff of the Institute of Musical Art (which later merged into Juilliard School) in New York City, headed by Frank Damrosch. Goetschius retired from the Institute in 1925 and spent the remainder of his life in Manchester, New Hampshire, continuing to write into his eighties.

Goetschius's notable pupils include Pauline Alderman, Henry Cowell, Lillian Fuchs, Howard Hanson, Swan Hennessy, Julia Klumpke, Daniel Gregory Mason, Frances Marion Ralston, Wallingford Riegger, Bernard Rogers, Alice Marion Shaw, Carrie Burpee Shaw, Arthur Shepherd, and Milton Suskind. Although Goetschius as a teacher had a fundamentally conservative outlook, he appears to have been sensitive and supportive towards his students' individuality, encouraging, for example, Henry Cowell's early experiments with tone clusters.

== Selected music theory textbooks ==
Goetschius published several textbooks on theory, including:

- The Material Used in Musical Composition (New York: G. Schirmer)

1st ed. (1882); OCLC 558882224
2nd ed. (alternate link) (1889)
4th ed. (1895)
8th ed. (1907); OCLC 20836840
14th ed. (1941 print) (1913, 1915, 1941); OCLC 854588114, 603255234, 981774965, OCLC 989474583

- The Theory and Practice of Tone-Relations (Boston: New England Conservatory, 1892); OCLC 62459269, 875583226

11th ed. New York: G. Schirmer (1913); OCLC 10390239
15th ed. (1917)
24th ed., New York: G. Schirmer (1931); OCLC 351740363

- Models of the Principal Musical Forms (Boston: New England Conservatory, 1892); OCLC 957765390
- Lessons in Music Form, Boston: Oliver Ditson (1904)
- Exercises in Melody Writing (New York: G. Schirmer)

1st ed. (1900); OCLC 497628594
2nd ed. (1903)
?? ed. (1905); OCLC 250682608
6th ed. (1908)
7th ed. (1910)
11th ed. (1923)
?? ed. (1928); OCLC 459452058

- The Larger Forms of Musical Composition (New York: G. Schirmer)

5th ed. (1915); OCLC 989390504
7th ed. (1915); OCLC 752431436

- The Homophonic Forms of Musical Composition (New York: G. Schirmer)

1st ed. (1898)
? ed. (1901); OCLC 499943798
3rd ed. (1905)
3rd ed. (1908)
4th ed. (1907); OCLC 757059439, 752431426
7th ed. (1913)
8th ed. (1915); OCLC 1844527
9th ed. (1918); OCLC 868507364
10th ed. (1921)
11th ed. (1923)

- Music Theory for Piano Students, co-authored with Clarence Grant Hamilton, John P. Marshall, Will Earhart (Boston: Oliver Ditson)

(1924); OCLC 5020226
?? (1930)

- Exercises in Elementary Counterpoint (G. Schirmer)

5th ed. (1910); OCLC 756994501

- Counterpoint (New York: G. Schirmer, 1930)
- The Structure of Music (Philadelphia: T. Presser, 1934)

As of the mid-20th century, use of Goetschius' books, as texts, is rare; albeit, the books contain original theoretical ideas and pedagogical approaches that endure today.

== Goetschius' theory of harmonic progression ==
Perhaps the most important theory put forth by Goetschius is that of natural harmonic progression, which first appeared in The Theory and Practice of Tone-Relations. According to Goetschius' theory, the triad V in a key resolves to the tonic triad I because of the acoustically perfect interval of the fifth between the root of V and that of I:

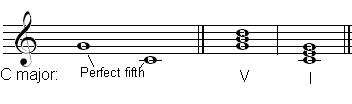

Goetschius believed that, since the upper tone of the fifth is a harmonic of the lower, a chord rooted on the upper tone demands to be "resolved" by progressing to the chord rooted on the lower tone. Moreover, this theory is extended to other chords in a key, so that the normal tendency of a chord (triad or seventh chord) in a key is to progress to the chord rooted a fifth lower.

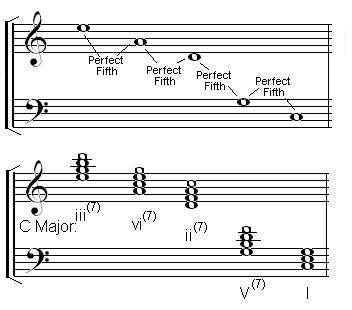

== Family ==
My family name is (or should be) pronounced get'she-us. The family hails from Switzerland (1714), where the name was Götschi. One of my ancestors, middle of the 18th century, an earnest Latin scholar, affixed the Latin terminal us.

— Percy Goetschius, as he told the Literary Digest

He was married twice, the second time to Maria C. C. Stephany on June 14, 1899. He had two children. His granddaughter was musician Marjorie Goetschius.

Percy Goetschius died at his home in Manchester, New Hampshire on October 29, 1943.
