= Rockland Public Library =

Coordinates: 44.105°N 69.1115°W

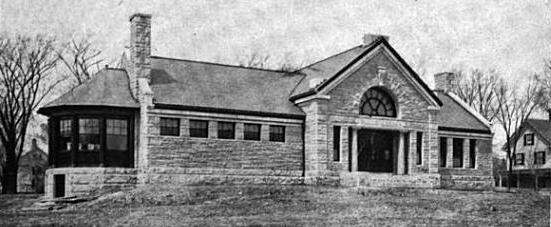
- Location: Union St., Rockland, Maine, United States
- Type: Public
- Established: 1903

Collection
- Size: 52,000

Access and use
- Circulation: 168,000
- Population served: 7,297

Other information
- Budget: $617,726
- Director: Amy Levine
- Employees: 11

The Rockland Public Library is located at 80 Union Street in central Rockland, Maine. It is located in an architecturally distinguished building, built in 1903–04 with funding support from Andrew Carnegie. The library was listed on the National Register of Historic Places in 1979 for its architecture. The library is one of the only libraries in Maine designated as a "Star Library" by Library Journal.

== Architecture and history ==
The Rockland Public Library is located on the west side of Rockland's commercial downtown, at the western end of a parcel bounded by Union, White, and Beech Streets, with St. Peter's Episcopal Church next door to the south. Although it carries a Union Street address, it is separated from that street by a small park, and it has entrances facing the park and White Street. It is a single-story masonry structure, built out of cut granite, with a full basement and a cross-gabled roof configuration. It is roughly H-shaped, with the original 1903-04 building facing east, joined via a wide hyphen to a modern wing facing west. The original main block has Romanesque and Beaux Arts styling, including Doric columns flanking the recessed Union Street entrance, and an apsoidal southern reading area, its windows articulated by pilasters.

The library was built in 1903–04, and was funded in part by a $20,000 grant from Andrew Carnegie. It is the city's only major example of Beaux Arts architecture, a style that is also uncommon in the state. It was designed by Maine native George Clough, then in partnership with Herbert Wardner.

In July 1910, President William Taft gave a speech to a large audience assembled on the library lawn. In 1915, the building was wired for electricity. In 1942, Maine composer Carrie Burpee Shaw donated her music collection (over 100 books plus sheet music) to the Rockland Public Library.

== See also ==
- National Register of Historic Places listings in Knox County, Maine
- List of Carnegie libraries in Maine
