= June Weybright =

American composer

June Elizabeth Weybright Reeder (June 15, 1903 – November 15, 1996) was an American composer and music educator who is best known for her piano method books and compositions, published under the name June Weybright. She was born in Jeffersonville, Indiana, and studied at the Leo Miller Institute of Music (St. Louis, Missouri), Washington University, and the Juilliard School of Music. Her teachers included Kate Chittenden, Jessie L. Gaynor and Effa Ellis Perfield. Weybright began teaching in 1925, and married Leland Reeder in St. Louis on July 20, 1940.

In addition to teaching, Weybright conducted choral groups and gave many lectures and workshops on topics such as "For a Musical America," "Music in the Everyday Life of Our Juniors," and "Reading Fluency for All Students." She belonged to the Mu Phi Epsilon international music fraternity.

Weybright composed or arranged over 300 piano pieces in 48 volumes, as well as pedagogical material on music theory, and music for four hands, six hands, and two pianos. She was published by Belwin Mills, which was later acquired by Alfred Music publishing company.

Her best-known works include:

- Belwin Piano Method (in five books)
- Belwin Theory Worksheets
- Etudes for Pianists
- Mildly Contemporary: An Introduction to Contemporary Music for Early Grade Pianists
- Technic for Pianists
- Weybright Course for Pianists
