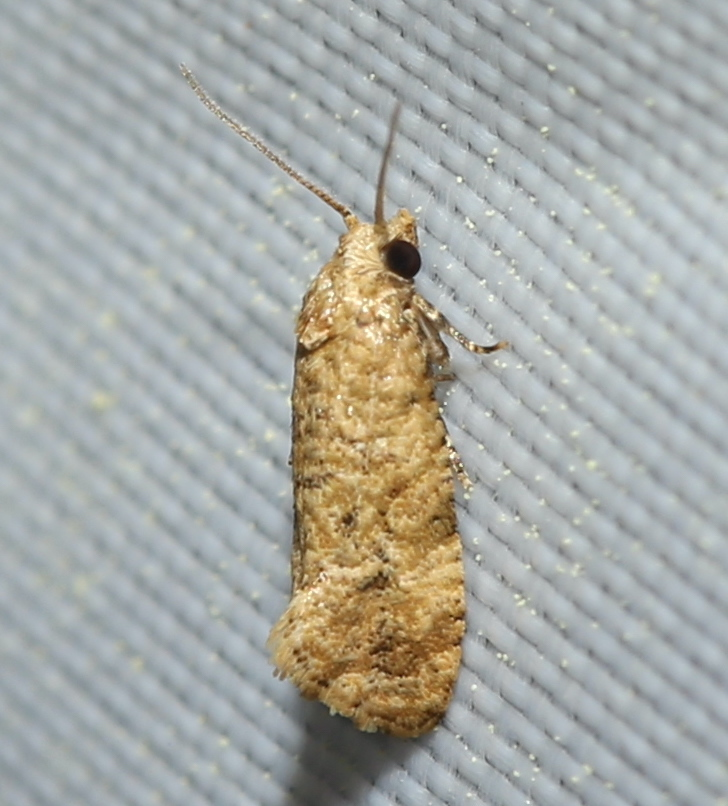

Scientific classification
- Kingdom: Animalia
- Phylum: Arthropoda
- Clade: Pancrustacea
- Class: Insecta
- Order: Lepidoptera
- Family: Tortricidae
- Genus: Lorita
- Species: L. baccharivora

Binomial name
- Lorita baccharivora Pogue, 1988

= Lorita baccharivora =

Groundsel leafroller

Species of moth

Lorita baccharivora, the groundsel leafroller, is a species of moth of the family Tortricidae. It is native to Florida and Texas, but has been introduced to Australia for the biological control of groundsel bush (Baccharis halimifolia).

The wingspan is about 8 mm. The fore- and hindwings are brown with a faint pattern. There are several generations per year.

The larvae feed on Baccharis halimifolia.
