= Lorita insulicola =

Scientific classification
- Kingdom: Animalia
- Phylum: Arthropoda
- Clade: Pancrustacea
- Class: Insecta
- Order: Lepidoptera
- Family: Tortricidae
- Genus: Lorita
- Species: L. insulicola

Binomial name
- Lorita insulicola Razowski & Becker, 2007

Species of moth

Lorita insulicola is a species of moth of the family Tortricidae. It is found on the British Virgin Islands and Guadeloupe.

The wingspan is about 7.5 mm.

The larvae feed on the flowers of Mangifera indica.
