= Frances Marion Ralston =

American musician (1875–1952)

- Born: Frances Marion Ralston; January 7, 1875; St. Louis, Missouri, U.S.
- Died: February 5, 1952; Arcadia, California, U.S.
- Other name: Fanny
- Education: New England Conservatory of Music
- Known for: Piano compositions
- Notable work: Reflections of a Musician, Six Pieces in the Greek Modes, Sonata (piano)
- Parent(s): Lucy Boyd Lewis; John Ralston

Frances Marion Ralston (“Fanny”) (7 January 1875 - 5 February 1952) was an American author, composer, pianist and teacher. Widely published during her lifetime, she is best known for her works for piano.

== Biography ==
Ralston was born in St. Louis, Missouri, to Lucy Boyd Lewis and John Ralston. She studied music at the New England Conservatory of Music and in Chicago. Her teachers included Carl Faelten, Arthur Foote, Percy Goetschius, Ernest R. Kroeger, Fannie Payne, Richard S. Poppen, Nellie Strong Stevenson and Adolf Weidig. In 1896, she gave a recital of her own compositions in St. Louis.

Ralston was awarded residencies at the MacDowell Colony (today known as MacDowell) in 1917, 1918, 1919, 1926, and 1944. She served as director of the music department at Central College (Lexington, Missouri) for two years, and director of the music school at Rockford College (today Rockford University) in Illinois for nine years. She died in Arcadia, California.

== Works ==
Ralston's works are archived at the University of California, Los Angeles, Library. They were published by Balmer and Weber, Breitkopf & Härtel, C. F. Summy, Composer Press, G. Schirmer Inc., Hatch Music Company, R. G. Badger, Schroeder & Gunther, Theodore Presser Company and Thiebes-Stierlin Music Company. Her works include:

=== Prose ===
- How to Start a Private Class in a New Field (article in The Musician November 1927)
- Reflections of a Musician (book)

=== Chamber music ===
- Fantasie for String Quartet
- Five Tone Poems (violin, cello and piano)
- Sonata Spirituel (violin and piano)
- Sonata No. 2 (violin and piano)

=== Orchestral works ===
- Rhapsody (piano and orchestra)

=== Organ works ===
- Scotch Idyll
- Winter

=== Piano works ===
- Crimson and Gold Maples
- Etude
- Fantasie Impromptu
- Impressions at Wellesley
- Morning Song
- Musical Ideas for Beginners
- Orientales
- Prelude and Fugue in G
- Romanza, opus 1
- Six Etudes
- Six Pieces in the Greek Modes
- Six Preludes
- Sonata
- Song Without Words, opus 10
- The Sea: Prelude and Fuguetta for Two Pianos
- Theme and Variations
- Three Impressions
- Three Little Waltzes: Avowal, Estrangement and Reconciliation

=== Vocal works ===
- 24th Psalm and Gloria (SATB and piano)
- Awakening: Quintette (women's quartet and cello)
- Claribel (two sopranos and alto)
- “Greeting”
- “Ich Liebe Dich”
- “Mother”
- “Rabbi Ben Ezra” (text by Robert Browning)
- Saul: An Oratorio (men's chorus and flute, harp and piano or organ)
