= Antha Minerva Virgil =

American author, composer, and music educator

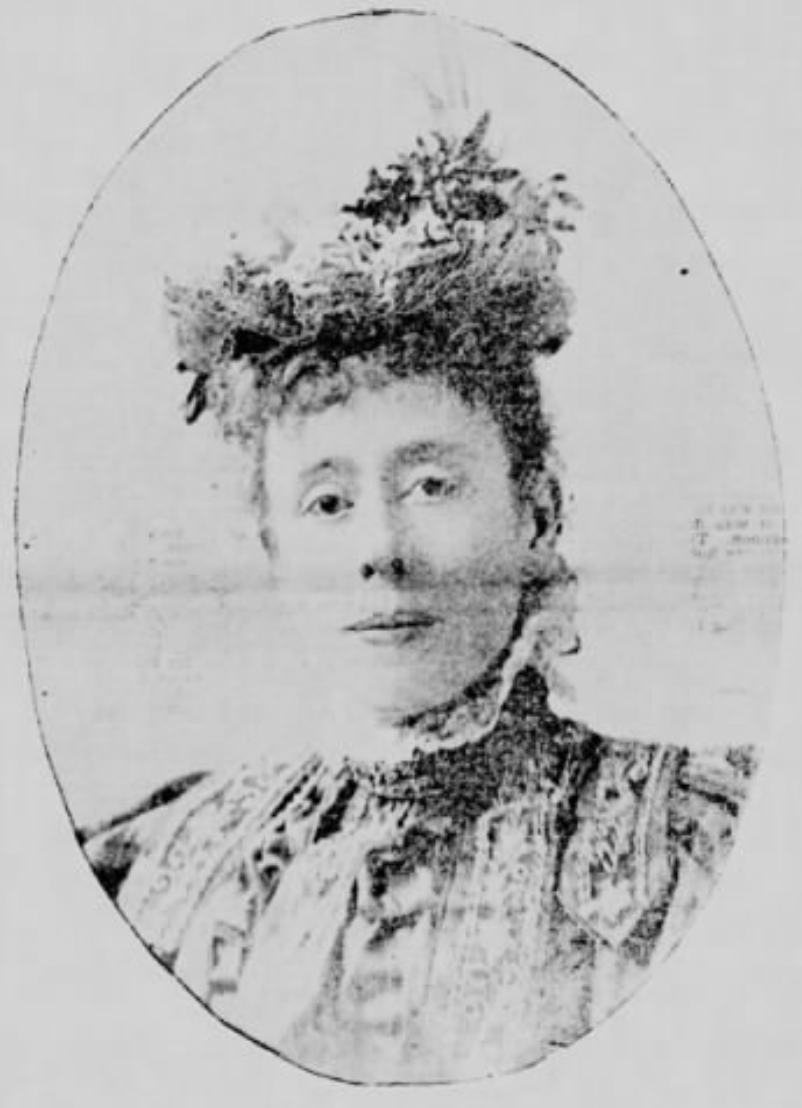
Virgil in 1897

Antha Minerva Patchen Virgil Bergman (c. 1852-1939) was an American author, composer, and music educator who helped develop and patent the Virgil silent practice keyboard, also known as the Virgil clavier. She used the name "Antha M. Virgil" professionally.

Antha was born in Elmira, New York, to Minerva Ruth Cole and Uriah Patchen. Little is known about her education following her graduation from high school in Burlington, Iowa. She began teaching piano at Almon Kincaid Virgil's music conservatory in Burlington in 1877, then married Almon in 1878. In 1879, they moved to Peoria, Illinois, where they opened a music school which continued for four years.

== Techniphone ==
The Virgils moved to New York City in 1883 and developed a soundless keyboard with adjustable weights on the keys for silent practice, called the Techniphone, also known as the Virgil clavier. Almon eventually obtained eight patents for this device and its accessories. Antha helped him build an improved pedal and footrest for children and a small practice keyboard. She continued giving piano lessons and wrote articles for music journals which included The Musical Courier, The Etude, and The Musician.

Antha also wrote The Virgil Clavier Method, Foundation Exercises, Book 1 was published in 1889. The Virgil Clavier Company was formed in 1890 and Antha opened the Virgil Piano School in New York in 1891. Almon opened Virgil Piano Schools in England and Germany in 1895, followed by schools in Chicago (1896), Boston (1899), and other cities including St. Petersburg, Florida. Althea’s students included Carrie Burpee Shaw.

== Tekniklavier ==
The Virgils divorced in 1900. Antha submitted at least one patent application (#3,617) for a "practice clavier" in 1901. She opened her own clavier factory in New Jersey, where she employed a piano technician named Amos C. Bergman whom she married in 1902. Like Almon, Bergman obtained eight patents for the practice clavier he and Antha developed under the name "Tekniklavier." The tekniklaviers were stamped with gold letters in the wood over the keyboard: "MADE BY MRS. A. M. VIRGIL NEW YORK." Antha also advertised an economy model in the early 20th century called the "new Bergman clavier."

== Compositions ==
In addition to Virgil Clavier method books, Antha composed or arranged over 250 graded songs for piano students, using opus numbers ranging up to opus 98. In her articles and lectures about piano pedagogy, Antha advocated using a metronome for practice. She often included metronome markings on her compositions.

== Virgil Clavier ==
At the peak of the Virgil clavier's popularity, there was a correspondence course to certify Virgil teachers from as far away as Australia and India. Celebrity pianists such as Vladimir de Pachmann, Moritz Moszkowski, and Amy Beach praised the Virgil clavier, however, it fell into obscurity after the death of Almon's second wife Florence Dodd in 1945.
