= June Gilmore =

American baseball player

- Outfielder
- Born: June 13, 1922; Peoria, Illinois, U.S.
- Died: January 6, 1980 (aged 57); Peoria, Illinois, U.S.
- Batted: Right Threw: Right

Teams
- Rockford Peaches (1944)

Career highlights and awards
- Women in Baseball – AAGPBL Permanent Display at the Baseball Hall of Fame and Museum (unveiled in 1988)

June Gilmore (later Hawton; June 13, 1922 – January 6, 1980) was an outfielder who played in the All-American Girls Professional Baseball League (AAGPBL) in its 1944 season. Listed at 5' 1", 110 lb., she batted and threw right handed.

Born in Peoria, Illinois, June Gilmore joined the Rockford Peaches during the second season of the league. She did not have individual records or additional information was incomplete at the time of the request.

The All-American Girls Professional Baseball League folded in 1954, but there is a permanent display at the Baseball Hall of Fame and Museum at Cooperstown, New York, since 1988 that honors the entire league rather than any individual figure.
