= Nellie Strong Stevenson =

American pianist

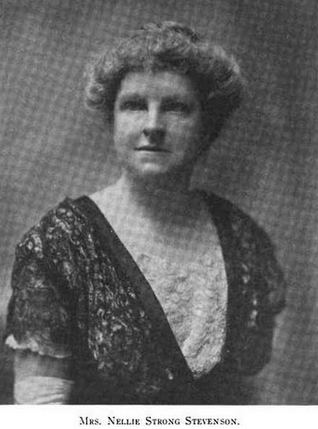
- Nellie Strong Stevenson, from 1915 publication
- Born: Ellen C. Strong; June 14, 1856; Rockford, Illinois
- Died: July 9, 1930 (aged 74); Washington, D.C.
- Occupations: Pianist, music teacher and clubwoman

Nellie Strong Stevenson (June 14, 1856 – July 9, 1930), born Ellen Strong, was an American pianist, music teacher and clubwoman.

== Early life ==
Ellen C. Strong was born in Rockford, Illinois and raised in St. Louis, Missouri, the daughter of George P. Strong and Melinda P. Fales Strong. Her father was a lawyer and a judge. She trained as a pianist in St. Louis. She went to Europe for further studies in Leipzig and Berlin, and with Franz Liszt at a summer program in Weimar.

== Career ==
Strong taught and performed in St. Louis, New York and Boston as a young woman. Her students included Frances Marion Ralston. She was the founding president of the Missouri Music Teachers Association, and spoke at the World's Music Congress, held at the World's Columbian Exposition in 1893. She chaired the Students Department of the National Federation of Music Clubs. In that position, she wrote about topics of interest to student musicians; she was also chair of the National Federation Contest for Young Artists.

In 1917, Strong was based in San Diego, where she was head of the piano department at the Sloan School of Music and played at the organ pavilion in Balboa Park. By 1919 she was based in San Francisco, and wrote about music libraries in California in 1921. She gave music appreciation lectures, accompanying herself on piano, into her last years. She was a director of the California Music Teachers Association and a member of the Western Women's Club and Pacific Coast Women's Press Association.

== Personal life ==
Strong married lawyer John Chiles Houston Stevenson, the son of Union Army general John Dunlap Stevenson, in 1894. She was widowed when he died in San Francisco in 1922, and she died in 1930, aged 74 years, while visiting Washington, D.C.
