= Lorraine Bunton =

Lorraine Bunton was a pitcher who played in the All-American Girls Professional Baseball League (AAGPBL). She batted and threw right-handed.

== Notes ==
- Little is known about this player. Bunton appears as a member of the Rockford Peaches club during its 1951 season. Nevertheless, the league stopped individual achievements after 1948, so individual accomplishments are complete only through 1949.
- She is part of the AAGPBL permanent display at the Baseball Hall of Fame and Museum at Cooperstown, New York opened in 1988, which is dedicated to the entire league rather than any individual figure.
