= Hattie Peterson =

American baseball player

- Pitcher
- Born: April 17, 1930; Winnebago, Illinois, U.S.
- Died: March 30, 2017 (aged 86); Mount Morris, Illinois, U.S.
- Batted: Right Threw: Right

Teams
- Rockford Peaches (1948–1949)

Career highlights and awards
- Women in Baseball – AAGPBL Permanent Display at the Baseball Hall of Fame and Museum (unveiled in 1988)

Hattie A. Peterson Oberg (April 17, 1930 – March 30, 2017) was an American pitcher who played in the All-American Girls Professional Baseball League (AAGPBL). She played under her maiden name, Hattie Peterson.

A native of Winnebago, Illinois, Hattie was one of nine children born to Walter and Hattie LaTour Peterson, of Scandinavian ancestry.

She joined the All American League with the Rockford Peaches club, where she spent two seasons from 1948 to 1949. She was forced to retire after injuring her throwing arm. Afterwards, she moved with her family to Phoenix, Arizona.

In the late 1950s, Hattie worked in manufacturing for the Motorola research and development laboratory in Phoenix until her retirement in the 1990s.

Hattie returned to Rockford, Illinois in 2007, where she lived most of her life. In her spare time, she enjoyed playing the accordion; a hobby that she did not pick up until she was in her 40s. As a result, she was still active in accordion clubs and entertained fellow retirement home residents.

In addition, she was a diehard Chicago Cubs fan, as she lived to see her loved team win the 2016 World Series.

In 1988, Hattie A. Peterson Oberg received further recognition when she became part of Women in Baseball, a permanent display based at the Baseball Hall of Fame and Museum in Cooperstown, New York, which was unveiled to honor the entire All-American Girls Professional Baseball League.

She died in 2017 in Mount Morris, Illinois, at the age of 86.
