= Margaret Jurgensmeier =

American baseball player (1934–2020)

- Pitcher
- Born: September 2, 1934; Rockford, Illinois, U.S.
- Died: June 26, 2020 (aged 85); Machesney Park, Illinois, U.S.
- Batted: Right Threw: Right

Teams
- Rockford Peaches (1951)

Career highlights and awards
- Women in Baseball – AAGPBL Permanent Display at the Baseball Hall of Fame and Museum (since 1988)

Margaret Jurgensmeier (later Carroll; September 2, 1934 – June 26, 2020) was a pitcher who played in the All-American Girls Professional Baseball League (AAGPBL). Listed at 5' 7", 130 lb., she batted and threw right handed. She was dubbed Jurgy by her teammates.

Born in Rockford, Illinois, Margaret Jurgensmeier began playing tee-ball at age four. Margaret was 16 when she joined the league with her home team, the Rockford Peaches. But she was not given much of an opportunity to pitch, appearing in only nine games during the 1951 season with the Peaches.

Jurgensmeier posted a 1–1 record with a 7.96 ERA, allowing 31 runs (23 earned) on 23 hits and 37 walks, while striking out seven over 26 innings of work.

Margaret married Ron Carroll the following year and left the league behind. They raised three boys: Mike, Steve and Dave. Twin brothers Ron and Don Carroll married sisters Margaret and Doris Jurgensmeier, and both families lived in adjacent houses built on land owned by a family uncle in Roscoe, Illinois.

The All-American Girls Professional Baseball League folded in 1954, but there is now a permanent display at the Baseball Hall of Fame and Museum at Cooperstown, New York, since November 5, 1988, that honors those who were part of the league. Margaret, along with the rest of the girls and the league staff, is included at the display/exhibit.

She died on June 26, 2020.
