= Berith Melin =

American baseball player

- Center field
- Born: May 2, 1918; Rockford, Illinois, U.S.
- Died: December 11, 1977 (aged 59); Rockford, Illinois, U.S.
- Batted: Right Threw: Right

Teams
- Rockford Peaches (1943)

Career highlights and awards
- Women in Baseball – AAGPBL Permanent Display at Baseball Hall of Fame and Museum (1988)

Berith "Berry" Ahlquist (later Melin; May 2, 1918 – December 11, 1977) was an outfielder who played in the All-American Girls Professional Baseball League (AAGPBL). She batted and threw right-handed.

Berith Ahlquist was one of the Rockford Peaches founding members of the All-American Girls Professional Baseball League in its 1943 inaugural season.

Born in Rockford, Illinois to Hjalmar and Valborg Ahlquist (both of Swedish origin), at age 25, Berith became one of the oldest players signed by the league and was also the only Rockford native to play for her hometown Peaches. She served primarily as backup outfielder, mainly at center field, while posting a .158 average with two home runs and four RBI in 56 games.

Berith married Manfred J. Melin in 1942, and they had two sons, John and Bruce. Following her baseball stint, she stayed home to take care of her family. She lived all her life in Rockford, where she died in 1977 at the age of 59 following a long illness.

Eleven years after her death, Berith Melin received further recognition when she became part of Women in Baseball, a permanent display based at the Baseball Hall of Fame and Museum in Cooperstown, New York, which was unveiled to honor the entire All-American Girls Professional Baseball League.

== Career statistics ==
Batting

GP	AB	R	H	2B	3B	HR	RBI	SB	TB	BB	SO	BA	OBP	SLG
56	146	7	23	2	2	2	4	4	35	5	25	.158	.186	.240

Fielding

GP	PO	A	E	TC	DP	FA
42	27	4	3	34	1	.912
