= Aldine Calacurcio =

American baseball player

- Shortstop / Infield Utility
- Born: June 8, 1928; Rockford, Illinois, U.S.
- Died: July 4, 2017 (aged 89); Rockford, Illinois, U.S.
- Batted: Right Threw: Right

Teams
- Rockford Peaches (1947)

Career highlights and awards
- Women in Baseball – AAGPBL Permanent Display at Baseball Hall of Fame and Museum (since 1988)

Aldine Calacurcio (June 8, 1928 – July 4, 2017) was a former shortstop who played in the All-American Girls Professional Baseball League (AAGPBL). Calacurcio batted and threw right handed. She was born in Rockford, Illinois.

In 1947, Calacurcio attended the AAGPBL spring training games held at Havana, Cuba. Afterwards, she saw limited action with her hometown Rockford Peaches.

The AAGPBL folded in 1954, but there is a permanent display at the Baseball Hall of Fame and Museum at Cooperstown, New York, since November 5, 1988, that honors the entire league rather than any individual figure.

Calacurcio died on July 4, 2017, in Rockford Illinois. Her funeral was attended by numerous Rockfordians who respected her and the legacy of the Rockford Peaches.
