= Carl Faelten =

German-American pianist and teacher

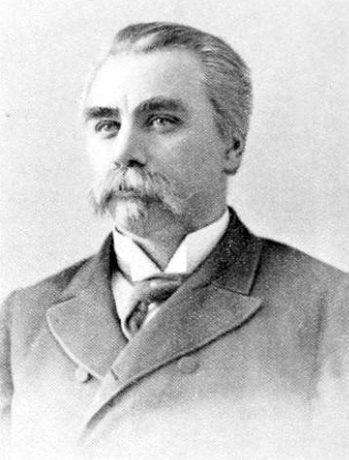
- Born: December 21, 1846; Ilmenau, Saxe-Weimar-Eisenach, Germany
- Died: July 20, 1925 (aged 78); Readfield, Maine, United States
- Occupations: Pianist, teacher
- Spouse: Adele Schloesser (m. 1877)
- Children: 3

Carl Faelten (1846–1925) was a German-American pianist and teacher.

== Biography ==
Carl Faelten was born in Ilmenau, Saxe-Weimar-Eisenach, Germany, on December 21, 1846.

He was primarily self-taught, but did study music as a school boy and at Frankfurt from 1868 until 1882 (from 1878 in the Hoch Conservatory). He was engaged at the Peabody Institute in Baltimore from 1882 until 1885, and at the New England Conservatory in Boston from 1885 until 1887. He was music director of the New England Conservatory from 1890 to 1897.

In September 1897, Faelten founded the Faelten Pianoforte-School Teachers Seminary, also in Boston, which by 1898 had 350 pupils.

He became a naturalized American citizen, and resided in Holliston, Massachusetts. He toured the US and Germany as a concert pianist.

He was the author of The Conservatory Course for Pianists, a widely used 16-volume series of textbooks. His students included Frances Marion Ralston.

He married Adele Schloesser in 1877, and they had three children.

Faelten drowned at Maranacook Lake in Readfield, Maine on July 20, 1925.
