= Dorothy Ferguson =

Canadian baseball player (1923–2003)

Dorothy Ferguson Key
- Second base / Third base / Center field
- Born: February 17, 1923; Virden, Manitoba, Canada
- Died: May 8, 2003 (aged 80); Rockford, Illinois, US
- Batted: Right Threw: Right

AAGPBL debut
- 1945, for the Rockford Peaches

Last appearance
- 1954, for the Rockford Peaches

Teams
- Rockford Peaches (1945–1946[end], 1947–1954); Peoria Redwings (1946[start])

Career highlights and awards
- 4× Championship team (1945, 1948–1950); Women in Baseball – AAGPBL Permanent Display at Baseball Hall of Fame and Museum (1988); Canadian Baseball Hall of Fame and Museum (1998); Manitoba Softball Hall of Fame (1998)

Member of the Canadian

Baseball Hall of Fame
- Induction: 2003

Dorothy B. "Dottie" Ferguson Key (February 17, 1923 – May 8, 2003) was a Canadian infielder and outfielder who played from 1945 through 1954 in the All-American Girls Professional Baseball League (AAGPBL). Listed at 5' 6", 125 lb., she batted and threw right handed.

== Early life ==
A native of Virden, Manitoba, Ferguson was one of the sixty-eight girls from Canada who played in the AAGPBL during its 12-year history. Athletically inclined from a young age, she began skating and was soon involved in softball. In 1939, she was named the North American women's speed skating champion. Only the coming of World War II prevented her from competing for Canada in the Olympics. Due to the conflict, the Games of 1940 to be held in Tokyo temporarily relocated to Helsinki, and upon the outbreak of war were canceled.

== Professional career ==
Ferguson entered the AAGPBL in 1945 with the Rockford Peaches, playing for them 10 years until the league folded in 1954. A proven performer, speedy Ferguson averaged over 46 stolen bases per season and collected a personal-best 91 steals in 1951. Though mainly a singles hitter, she was a productive force at the plate, connecting 645 hits while walking 455 times in 3216 at-bats. A versatile infielder who played mainly at second base and third, she gained respect amongst fellow players after switching to center field.

The Rockford Peaches were the most successful team in the history of the AAGPBL, winning the title in her first season (1945) and three in a row at one point (1948–1950). Ferguson was used sparingly in her rookie year, mostly at third base, batting only a .131 average in the regular season and 0-for-3 in the playoffs. She started 1946 with the Peoria Redwings but rejoined the Peaches in the midseason, hitting a combined .183 with a .307 on-base percentage in 80 games. Rockford defeated the Fort Wayne Daisies in the final series, four to one games, but she did not play in the series. In 1947 she became a spark plug on the team, stealing 71 bases to tie with Faye Dancer for fifth in the league, while batting .153 with a .283 OBP. Rockford ended sixth in the eight-team league, out of contention.

In 1948, Ferguson became the regular center fielder for the Peaches. She stole 73 bases, scored 73 runs, and drew 76 walks while hitting just .153, but she ended eighth in stolen bases and fifth in runs. In the semi-finals, the Peaches swept the South Bend Blue Sox in three games. Ferguson swiped seven bases and went 9-for-40 in the postseason, going 3-for-3 with two runs batted in in Game 2, as Rockford defeated Fort Wayne, four to one games, to clinch the AAGPBL title. Eleanor Callow led the team with 10 RBIs in 11 playoff games and drove in the winning run in three consecutive games. Other significant contributions came from star pitcher Helen Nicol (2–0) and shortstop Dorothy Harrell (7-for-17, .412, three RBI).

In 1949 Ferguson married Donald Key, a member of Canada's Olympic track and field team, and then played under the name of Dottie Key. She hit .179 with a .299 OBP and 56 steals in the regular season. Rockford disposed of the Grand Rapids Chicks in the final round, three to one games, and swept South Bend in the best-of-seven semifinal series. She drove in the winning run in the bottom of the ninth inning of Game 4 against the Blue Sox, and the Peaches captured the third championship in franchise history. Outfielder Eleanor Callow batted .375 in the final series (6-for-16).

Dottie raised her average to .234 in 1950, including a .314 OBP, while hitting 10-for-35 (.286) with seven runs in seven games against Fort Wayne, to help Rockford win a third consecutive title and fourth overall. Some bright spots for the Peaches included pitcher Nicol, who collected three victories, and first sacker Dorothy Kamenshek, who hit .440 (11-for-25) with nine runs and three RBI.

In 1951 Dottie hit .216, stole 91 bases and scored 91 times. She also belted her first career home run, and finished second to South Bend's Charlene Pryer in runs (106) and stolen bases (128). In the postseason, she went 3-for-20 (.150). Rockford beat Grand Rapids (2–0) in the first round but lost to South Bend (3–2) in the finals. South Bend came away a surprise winner to clinch the club's first AAGPBL title in the league, by combining deep pitching with an opportune hitting game. Jean Faut won two games, including decisive Game 5.

Dottie raised her average to .243 in 1952, but dropped to 46 steals and 54 runs scored. She still finished fifth in the league in stolen bases and hit .310 (9-for-29) with four steals in the postseason. For the second year in a row, Rockford advanced to the finals after defeating Fort Wayne (2–1) in the first round, only to be beaten again by Faut and the Blue Sox in the best-of-five series. As in the previous season, Faut was the winning pitcher in the decisive Game 5, hitting two triples and driving in two runs while turning in a 6–3 complete game performance.

In 1953, she hit .208 in the regular season and .364 (4-for-11) in the playoffs, while Rockford was beaten by Grand Rapids in the first round (2–1). In 1954, she hit a career-high .253 average but swiped only 14 bases. The Peaches finished last out of six teams, during what turned out to be the AAGPBL final season. She played for managers Bill Allington (1945-'46), (1948-'52), Eddie Ainsmith (1947) and Johnny Rawlings (1953-'54). A .201 career hitter, she scored 520 runs and stole 461 bases in 950 games.

== Honors and awards ==
Since 1988, Dottie and the other women who represented Canada in the AAGPBL formed part of the permanent display at the Baseball Hall of Fame and Museum at Cooperstown, New York, which is dedicated to the entire league rather than any individual player. She also gained inductions into the Canadian Baseball Hall of Fame and Museum (1998) and the Manitoba Softball Hall of Fame (1998), and was honored with the YWCA Janet Lynn Sports Award (1993). Her road uniform with the No. 12 is part of the Women in Baseball exhibit in Cooperstown. She was a longtime resident of Rockford, Illinois, where she died from cancer at the age of 80.

== Career statistics ==
Batting

GP	AB	R	H	2B	3B	HR	RBI	SB	TB	BB	SO	BA	OBP	SLG	OPS
950	3216	520	645	49	14	2	199	461	728	455	333	.201	.300	.226	.526

Fielding

GP	PO	A	E	TC	DP	FA
893	1616	358	106	2080	45	.949
