= Rockford Peaches =

Women's baseball team, 1943–1954

- 1943–1954; Rockford, Illinois
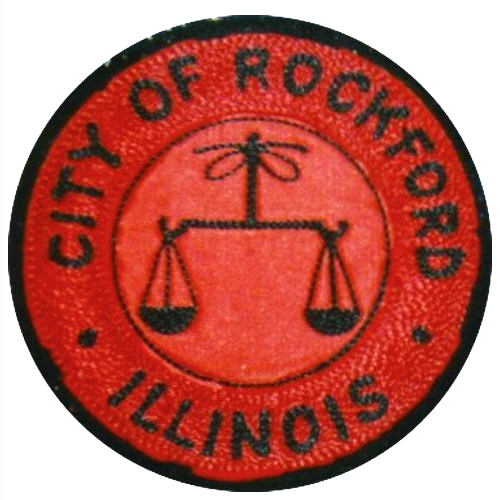
Team logo
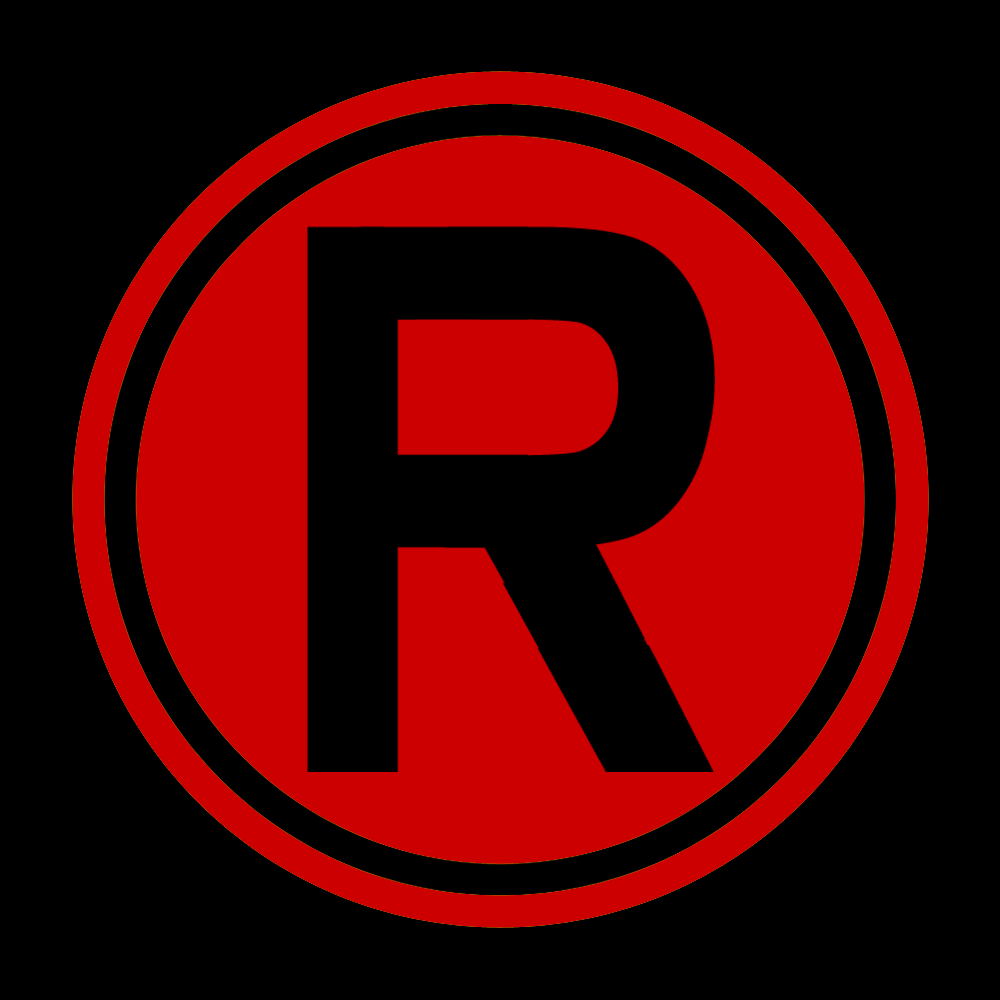
Cap insignia

Minor league affiliations
- League: All-American Girls Professional Baseball League

Minor league titles
- League titles (4): 1945; 1948; 1949; 1950

Team data
- Colors: Red, black
- Ballpark: Beyer Stadium
- Owner/ Operator: AAGPBL

1952 Rockford Peaches Back, L-R: Jacquelyn Kelley, Rose Gacioch, Eleanor Callow, Bill Allington (Manager), Marie Mansfield, Amy Irene Applegren, Carol Habben, Jean Buckley. Front, L-R: Dorothy Harrell Doyle, Dorothy Ferguson, Dolores Lee, Joan Berger, Dottie Green (Chaperone), Alice Pollitt, Ruth Richard, Helen Nordquist, Migdalia Perez.

The Rockford Peaches were a women's professional baseball team who played from 1943 to 1954 in the All-American Girls Professional Baseball League (AAGPBL). A founding member, the team represented Rockford, Illinois.

The Peaches were one of two teams to play in every AAGPBL season, the other being the South Bend Blue Sox. They played their home games at Beyer Stadium on 15th Avenue in Rockford. The team's uniform consisted of a peach colored dress featuring the Rockford city seal centered on the chest, along with red socks and cap. In later years, the Peaches wore a white home uniform with black socks and cap.

== History ==
One of the more successful teams in the All-American Girls Professional Baseball League, the Peaches won the league championship in 1945, 1948, 1949, and 1950 and had its share of star players.

Rockford Peaches was a team in the All-American Girls Professional Baseball League (AAGPBL) whose team name and colors were picked by Mr. Philip K. Wrigley, according the location proximity of the cities that did not have a major league male baseball team. Mrs. Helen Blanche (née Atwater) Wrigley; Wrigley's Art Designer Otis Shepard; and Chicago softball star Ann Harnett the first girl to sign a contract with the league; together, worked to design special uniforms for the League. The one-piece short-skirted flared tunic resembled the figure skating, tennis skirt, and field hockey uniforms of this time period. All uniforms were based on pastel colors. Satin shorts (a darker color than the tunic), knee-high baseball socks and baseball hat the uniform. Each city had a different colored uniform and its own symbolic patch decorated the front of the uniform. Femininity, was a high priority for Mrs. Wrigley and she employed Helena Rubenstein's Beauty Salon to teach personal hygiene, makeup, hair and mannerisms to make each Rockford Peach and all AAGPBL players the most attractive they could be. Part of the uniform was a makeup kit and instructions on how to use makeup to be part of the overall look for each team in the league. Rockford Peach player, Dorothy "Kammie" Kamenshek, recalled, "The first year was very difficult because [the skirts] were too flaring and too long. You'd go to stoop for a ground ball and the skirt would be there. But we accepted it." Ballplayers also accepted the wounds from sliding called 'strawberries' due to the shortness of the skirt and shorts.

Olive Little threw the first no-hitter in team and league history, on June 10, 1943.

Peaches players who were named to the All-Star teams from 1946 to 1954 included Dorothy Kamenshek, Lois Florreich, Dorothy Harrell, Carolyn Morris, Alice Pollitt, Ruth Richard, Rose Gacioch, Eleanor Callow, and Joan Berger. Pitcher Olive Little hurled the first no-hitter both in team and league history. In addition, Florreich was the pitching champion in 1949 during the league's overhand era, and Gladys Davis won the league batting crown in the 1943 inaugural season, while Kamenshek earned the honors in the 1946 and 1947 seasons.

The last living player of the first Peaches roster in AAGPBL, pitcher Mary Pratt, died on May 6, 2020, at the age of 101.

== A League of Their Own ==
The 1992 film A League of Their Own by Penny Marshall features the Rockford Peaches. However, all of the characters in the film are fictional. The team did not play in the 1943 league championship, as depicted in the film. In real life, the Racine Belles faced the Kenosha Comets in 1943; the Peaches won their first title in 1945.

The 2022 TV series A League of Their Own centers on the formation of the AAGPBL and the Rockford Peaches.

== All-time roster ==
Bold denotes members of the inaugural roster

- Velma Abbott
- Melba Alspaugh
- Amy Applegren
- Ange Armato
- Beverly Armstrong
- Charlene Barnett
- Joan Berger
- Rita Briggs
- Christine Bruce
- Jean Buckley
- Lorraine Bunton
- Shirley Burkovich
- **Eileen Burmeister**
- Aldine Calacurcio
- Eleanor Callow
- Mary Carey
- Betty Carveth
- Bea Chester
- Jean Cione
- **Muriel Coben**
- **Clara Cook**
- Donna Cook
- Dorothy Cook
- Betty Jane Cornett
- Dorothy Cramer
- Louella Daetweiler
- Barbara Anne Davis
- **Gladys Davis**
- Mildred Deegan
- Wanita Dokish
- Cartha Doyle
- Beverly Dustrude
- Louise Erickson
- Elizabeth Farrow
- Dorothy Ferguson
- Helen Filarski
- Alva Jo Fischer
- Lorraine Fisher
- Lois Florreich
- Anita Foss
- **Betty Jane Fritz**
- Rose Gacioch
- June Gilmore
- **Thelma Golden**
- Annie Gosbee
- **Dorothy Green**
- Carol Habben
- Audrey Haine
- Dorothy Harrell
- Josephine Hasham
- Ruby Heafner
- Shirley Hill
- Lillian Hlavaty
- Margaret Holgerson
- **Marjorie Hood**
- **Lillian Jackson**
- Donna Jogerst
- Marguerite Jones
- Marilyn Jones
- Margaret Jurgensmeier
- **Dorothy Kamenshek**
- Joan Kaufman
- Jacquelyn Kelley
- Adeline Kerrar
- Marguerite Kerrigan
- Nancy King
- Irene Kotowicz
- Dolores Lee
- Josephine Lenard
- Barbara Liebrich
- **Olive Little**
- Claire Lobrovich
- Jean Lovell
- Shirley Luhtala
- Betty Luna
- Gloria McCloskey
- **Ethel McCreary**
- Marie Mansfield
- Hazel Measner
- Naomi Meier
- **Berith Melin**
- Bernice Metesch
- Ruth Miller
- Anne "Annie" (Mihelich) Henry
- **Betty Moczynski**
- Dorothy Moon
- Mary Moore
- Carolyn Morris
- Doris Nelson
- **Helen Nelson**
- Helen Nicol
- Helen Nordquist
- Cynthia Normine
- Anna Mae O'Dowd
- **Pauline Oravets**
- Shirley Palesh
- Suzanne Parsons
- Barbara Payne
- Migdalia Pérez
- **Marjorie Peters**
- Betty Jean Peterson
- Hattie Peterson
- Alice Pollitt
- **Mary Pratt**
- Donna Reid
- Ruth Richard
- Ruth Ries
- Kay Rohrer
- Jenny Romatowski
- **Irene Ruhnke**
- Margaret Russo
- Sarah Jane Sands
- **Dorothy Sawyer**
- Edna Scheer
- Marilyn Schmidt
- Violet Schmidt
- Minnie Simons
- **Josephine Skokan**
- Helen Smith
- Mae Starch
- Jackie Stallings
- Elma Steck
- Margaret Stefani
- Lee Surkowski
- **Rella Swamp**
- Georgia Terkowski
- Barbara Thompson
- Gene Travis
- Betty Tucker
- Joan Tysver
- Virginia Ventura
- Zonia Vialat
- Helen Waddell
- Betty Warfel
- **Mildred Warwick**
- Rossey Weeks
- Marie Wegman
- Helen Westerman
- Margaret Wigiser
- Hazel Wildfong
- Janet Wiley
- Wilma Williams
- Verna Wilson
- **Lorraine Wuethrich**
- Betty Yahr

=== Manager ===
- Bill Allington

== See also ==
- Women's baseball
- Women in baseball
