= Dottie Green =

- Catcher / Chaperone
- Born: April 30, 1921; Natick, Massachusetts, U.S.
- Died: October 26, 1992 (aged 71); Natick, Massachusetts, U.S.
- Batted: Right Threw: Right

AAGPBL statistics
- Fielding average: 0.960
- Runs batted in: 43

Teams
- Rockford Peaches As a player (1943–1947) As a team chaperone (1948–1954)

Career highlights and awards
- All Star Team chaperone (1952); Championship Team (1945); Season-leader in fielding average (1944); One of three women to appear in all 12 seasons of the league

Dorothy M. Green (April 30, 1921 – October 26, 1992) was an American professional baseball catcher for the Rockford Peaches in the All-American Girls Professional Baseball League (AAGPBL) from 1943 through 1947, and a team chaperone from 1947 until the league ended in 1954. Listed at 5 ft 10 in (1.78 m) and 150 pounds (68 kg), she batted and threw right-handed. Despite similarities, Green was not the inspiration for Geena Davis's character, Dottie Hinson, in the 1992 film A League of Their Own; Dottie Hinson was loosely based on Green's teammate, Dottie Kamenshek.

== Early life ==
A native of Natick, Massachusetts, Green grew up as an all-round athlete. She started playing baseball with the boys of the neighborhood when she was about eight or ten years old. Later she attended and graduated from Natick High School, and was a competent athlete in any sport she could find to play. During her senior year at school she was captain of the girls' field hockey, basketball, and softball teams. Following her graduation, Green played from 1939 to 1941 for the Boston Olympettes, a semi-professional softball women's team that played in the Boston Garden. Walter Brown, the original owner of the Boston Celtics, organized the team as a means of having a weekly sports program during the summer months. Games were scheduled with teams from the New England area, the highlight being a game scheduled with teams from the New York area at Madison Square Garden.

In February 1943, Green knew that Philip K. Wrigley had founded a league exclusively for women players. Wrigley, a chewing gum manufacturer and owner of the Chicago Cubs Major League Baseball club, materialized his idea as a promotional sideline to maintain interest in baseball as the World War II military draft was depleting Major League rosters of first-line players. Green was one of three Olympettes recruited by the new league, along with Maddy English and Mary Pratt. Green and Pratt were assigned to the Rockford Peaches; English to the Racine Belles. Another two teams, the Kenosha Comets and South Bend Blue Sox, completed the original roster of the league.

== AAGPBL career ==
Green was one of four catchers for Rockford in the 1943 season. hit a .164 batting average in 48 games, while the Peaches finished in last place with a 55–90 record. At the end of the season, the Belles defeated Kenosha in a best-of-five series to become the first Champions in All-American Girls history.

Green saw more action in 1944, appearing in 98 games while hitting .145 with a career-high 23 stolen bases. She also led all catchers with a .962 fielding percentage (18 errors in 477 chances). In 1945 she hit .145 and posted a .966 fielding percentage, while the Peaches, with Bill Allington at the helm, defeated Grand Rapids in the first round of the playoffs and dispatched Fort Wayne, 4 to 1 games, to clinch the Championship Title.

In 1946, Green dropped to .116 but again showed her solid defense with a .958 fielding average. For the second consecutive year, Rockford reached the playoffs, but lost in the first round to Grand Rapids, 3 games to 2. In 1947 she batted .115 in only 14 games, before suffering a serious knee injury which ended her career. After her playing days were over, she became a AAGPBL chaperone until the folding of the league after the 1954 season, joining Dottie Hunter (1B/chaperone) and Dorothy Schroeder (SS) as the only girls to participate in all 12 seasons for the league. The Rockford Peaches and South Bend Blue Sox also were the two teams to be active in every AAGPBL season.

== Career statistics ==
Batting

GP	AB	R	H	2B	3B	HR	RBI	SB	TB	BB	SO	BA	OBP	SLG	OPS
280	767	73	107	9	6	1	43	44	131	103	127	.140	.241	.171	.412

Fielding

G	PO	A	E	TC	DP	FA
280	1129	151	55	1355	19	.957

== Life after baseball ==
The off season found Green managing and operating a dry cleaning plant. She also was an accomplished musician, playing trumpet and harmonica. She died at her home in Natick, Massachusetts at the age of 71. Her siblings were with her as she passed from natural causes.

Green appeared in Ken Burns's 1994 documentary Baseball where she discussed her experiences playing professional baseball.

== Facts ==
=== Players Association ===
When the All-American Girls Professional Baseball League was unable to continue in 1955, its history and its significance were soon forgotten. Many people in the 1950s thought that women were not supposed to play baseball, so most female athletes competed on other fields of endeavor. Finally, in 1980, former pitcher June Peppas launched a newsletter project to get in touch with friends, teammates and opponents, that resulted in the league's first-ever reunion in Chicago, Illinois in 1982. Starting from that reunion, a Players Association was formed five years later and many former players of the defunct league continued to enjoy reunions.

=== Hall of Fame honors ===
The AAGPBL Players Association movement helped to bring the league story to the public eye. The association was largely responsible for the opening of a permanent display at the Baseball Hall of Fame and Museum in Cooperstown, New York since November 5, 1988 that honors those who were part of this unique experience.

=== A League of Their Own ===
A League of Their Own is a 1992 film about the first season of the All-American Girls Professional Baseball League. While the film does not use real names, filmmaker Penny Marshall seemed to be aiming for realism, as her film includes fake newsreel footage and pseudo-documentary present day scenes at the beginning and end of the fictitious story. Although Dottie Green had the same first name, and played the same position on the same team as the character Dottie Hinson portrayed by Geena Davis in the film, that was merely a coincidence, according to those familiar with the All American Girls Professional Baseball League, including Kelly Candaele, one of the five sons of Helen Callaghan, who in 1945 won the AAGPBL batting championship with a .299 average. A League of Their Own itself was inspired by the 1987 documentary of the same title, written and produced by Candaele, who also collaborated with Kim Wilson in the story for the film. The AAGPBL players were relatively unknown until the Marshall's film was exhibited for the first time. After that, the AAGPBL Players Association reunions became formal annual events in 1998.

== Sources ==
- Brown, Patricia I. (12 March 2003). A League Of My Own: Memoir of a Pitcher for the All-American Girls (Paperback). Macfarland & Company, 2003. p. 216. ISBN 978-0-7864-1474-1.
- Madden, W. C. (27 February 2008). All-American Girls Professional Baseball League Record Book (Paperback). McFarland & Company, 2000. p. 294. ISBN 978-0-7864-3747-4.
- Heaphy, Leslie A.; May, Mel Anthony (2006). Encyclopedia of Women and Baseball (Paperback). McFarland & Company. p. 438. ISBN 0-7864-2100-2.
- Berlage, Gai Ingham; Gerard, Charley (1994). Women in Baseball: The Forgotten History (Hardcover). Greenwood Publishing Group. p. 224. ISBN 0-275-94735-1.
- Johnson, Susan E. (1994). When Women Played Hardball (Paperback). Seal Press. p. 320. ISBN 1-878067-43-5.
