= List of people from Racine, Wisconsin =

This is a list of individuals who are or were natives of, or notable as residents of, or in association with the city of Racine, Wisconsin, United States.

== Arts ==
- Kevin J. Anderson, author
- Gene Beery, artist
- Frank Bencriscutto, conductor, composer
- Karen Johnson Boyd, heiress, art dealer
- Lane Brody, born Lynn Voorlas, singer
- Mellona Moulton Butterfield, china painter, teacher
- Joyce Carlson, artist
- Alice E. Cleaver, artist
- Jason Paul Collum, author, film and television director
- Chi Coltrane, musician
- Chester Commodore, cartoonist, nominated for the Pulitzer Prize 12 times
- Ellen Corby, actress
- Marguerite Davis, biochemist, co-discoverer of vitamins A and B
- Victor DeLorenzo, drummer, Violent Femmes
- Peter Deming, cinematographer
- Harold Perry Erskine, sculptor and architect
- Payne Erskine, writer
- Norman D. Golden II, actor
- Greg Graffin, lead vocalist of political punk rock band Bad Religion
- Chad Harbach, author
- Max Hardcore (Paul F. Little), pornographer
- Ben Hecht, journalist, playwright and screenwriter
- Kevin Henkes, author and Caldecott Medal winner
- Lise Hilboldt, actress
- Harriet Persis Hurlbut, artist
- Zachary Scot Johnson, singer-songwriter
- David Kherdian, writer, poet and editor
- Larry Kusche, commercial pilot and author
- Fredric March, two-time Oscar-winning actor
- Barbara McNair, singer and actress
- Tina Moore, R&B singer
- Milton K. Ozaki, mystery writer
- Irene Purcell, actress, lived and died in Racine
- Warner Richmond, actor
- Liamani Segura, child singer
- Ben Sidran, musician
- Kristin Bauer van Straten, actress
- Joseph Philbrick Webster, songwriter and composer
- Nilay Patel, writer and journalist

== Athletics ==
- Ellen Ahrndt, AAGPBL player
- Bill Albright, NFL player
- Kevin Barry, NFL player
- Jeremiah Bass, soccer player
- Annastasia Batikis, AAGPBL player
- Caron Butler, NBA player
- Pancho Carter, Indy car racer
- Jim Chones, NBA player
- John Clay, NFL player
- Dorothy Damaschke, AAGPBL player
- Margaret Danhauser, AAGPBL player
- Norm Derringer, AAGPBL manager
- Myron Fohr, Indy car racer
- Bob Foster, NFL player
- Jimmy Grant, MLB player
- Jim Haluska, NFL player
- Steve Hanson, NFL player
- Jack Harris, NFL player
- Fritz Heinisch, NFL player
- Don Heinkel, MLB player
- Sonja Henning, WNBA player
- Joe Jagersberger, Indy car racer and engineer
- Jason Jaramillo, MLB player
- Abdul Jeelani, NBA player
- Kaitlin Keough, cyclist
- Ed Killian, MLB player
- Duane Kuiper, MLB player and broadcaster
- Glen Kuiper, MLB broadcaster
- Jeff Lee, NFL player
- Laurie Ann Lee, AAGPBL player
- Frances Lovett, AAGPBL player
- Ed Lytle, baseball player
- Chris Maragos, NFL player
- Jesse Marsch, professional soccer player and manager
- Jim McIlvaine, NBA player
- Kim Merritt, long-distance runner
- Jerry Mertens, NFL player
- Brent Moss, NFL player
- Leo Murphy, baseball player and manager
- Norm Nelson, stock car racer
- Dick Phillips, MLB player
- Eric Rasmussen, MLB player
- Linda L. Rice, thoroughbred racehorse trainer
- Shane Rawley, MLB pitcher
- Gene H. Rose, NFL player
- Vinny Rottino, MLB player
- Babe Ruetz, NFL head coach
- Howie Ruetz, NFL player
- Joe Ruetz, football player
- Charles Rutkowski, NFL player
- Alex Scales, NBA player
- Tom Sorensen, Olympic volleyball player
- Jack Taschner, MLB player
- Ralph Thomas, NFL player
- Tim Van Galder, NFL player
- Fred Venturelli, NFL player
- Jamil Wilson, NBA player
- Jerry Woods, NFL player
- Al Zupek, NFL player

== Business ==
- Jerome Case, inventor
- Percy H. Batten, founder of Twin Disc, industrialist
- Nate Blumberg, president and chairman of the board of Universal Pictures
- Albert J. Dremel, founder of the Dremel company
- Matthew M. Fox (1911–1964), vice president of Universal Pictures
- George N. Gillett Jr., owner of the Montreal Canadiens ice hockey team; co-owner of Premier League team, Liverpool F.C. and the NASCAR auto racing team Gillett Evernham Motorsports
- Jay Grinney, president and chief executive officer of Birmingham, Alabama-based HealthSouth Corporation
- Jon Hammes, founder and managing partner of Hammes Company
- Herbert Fisk Johnson Jr., former head of S.C. Johnson & Son
- Herbert Fisk Johnson Sr., former head of S.C. Johnson & Son
- Herbert Fisk Johnson III, chairman and CEO of S.C. Johnson & Son, member of the Forbes 400
- Samuel C. Johnson, industrialist (wax)
- Samuel Curtis Johnson Sr., founder of S.C. Johnson & Son
- Helen Johnson-Leipold, CEO of Johnson Outdoors
- Jim Jorgensen, entrepreneur; Discovery Zone, AllAdvantage and Women's Sports Foundation
- Craig Leipold, majority owner of NHL's Minnesota Wild
- Don Smiley, president and CEO of Summerfest and former Major League Baseball executive
- Fred Young, president and CEO of Young Radiator
- Asha Sharma, Executive Vice-President (EVP) and CEO of Xbox

== Military ==
- Harold C. Agerholm, USMC private first class, World War II, Medal of Honor recipient
- James Roy Andersen, USAAF brigadier general
- Arthur S. Born, U.S. Navy rear admiral
- Charles F. Born, U.S. Army and Air Force major general
- Dominic A. Cariello, Wisconsin Army National Guard brigadier general
- Clinton W. Davies, U.S. Air Force brigadier general
- Gregory A. Feest, U.S. Air Force major general
- Irving Fish, U.S. Army major general
- George Clay Ginty, Union Army brigadier general
- Donald G. Iselin, U.S. Navy rear admiral, commander NAVFAC
- John L. Jerstad, major, USAAF, World War II aviator and Medal of Honor recipient
- Travis King, U.S. Army private second class, defected to North Korea on 18 July, 2023

== Politics and law ==
- Gar Alperovitz, historian, political economist, activist, writer
- Robert H. Baker, Wisconsin legislator, Racine mayor and alderman, chairman of the Wisconsin Republican Party
- George L. Buck, Wisconsin legislator and businessman
- Melbert B. Cary, chairman of the Connecticut Democratic Party
- Champion S. Chase, mayor of Omaha, Nebraska; namesake of Chase County, Nebraska
- Carl C. Christensen, Wisconsin legislator and businessman
- Joseph Clancy, Wisconsin legislator and businessman
- Henry A. Cooper, U.S. representative
- Thomas P. Corbett, Wisconsin legislator and jurist
- Marcel Dandeneau, Wisconsin educator and politician
- John Dickert, Racine mayor
- John Dixon, Wisconsin legislator and businessman
- Joshua Eric Dodge, Wisconsin Supreme Court
- James Rood Doolittle, U.S. senator
- Henry Dorman, Wisconsin legislator
- John Elkins, Wisconsin legislator
- Edward Engerud, justice of the North Dakota Supreme Court
- Thomas Falvey, Wisconsin legislator and Racine mayor
- Margaret Farrow, first female lieutenant governor of Wisconsin
- Scott C. Fergus, Wisconsin legislator
- Peter C. Fishburn, mathematician who (with Steven Brams) rediscovered approval voting
- Gerald T. Flynn, U.S. representative
- Willis Frazell, Wisconsin legislator and barber
- William C. Giese, Wisconsin legislator and educator
- Walter Goodland, Governor of Wisconsin
- George Groesback, member of the Montana House of Representatives
- Joseph C. Hamata, Wisconsin legislator and businessman
- Ole Hanson, mayor of Seattle, Washington; founder of San Clemente, California and co-founder of Lake Forest Park, Washington
- James M. Hare, Michigan secretary of state
- Jack Harvey, Wisconsin politician
- Max W. Heck, Wisconsin politician and jurist
- Richard P. Howell, Wisconsin legislator, carpenter, and businessman
- Wallace Ingalls, Wisconsin legislator and lawyer
- Lorenzo Janes. Wisconsin territorial legislator, lawyer, and businessman
- Charles Jonas, lieutenant governor of Wisconsin
- John Lehman, Wisconsin legislator and educator
- William P. Lyon, 7th chief justice of the Wisconsin Supreme Court, 12th Speaker of the Wisconsin State Assembly, Union Army officer
- Harry Mares, former mayor of White Bear Lake, MN, Minnesota state representative and educator
- Cory Mason, Wisconsin legislator and current mayor of Racine
- Henry F. Mason, Kansas legislator
- John G. McMynn, Wisconsin Superintendent of Public Instruction
- Gwen Moore, U.S. representative for Wisconsin
- Peter C. Myers, Missouri politician
- Greta Neubauer, Wisconsin legislator
- Jeffrey A. Neubauer, Wisconsin legislator and businessman, former chairman of the Democratic Party of Wisconsin
- Lisa Neubauer, Wisconsin judge
- Wallace E. Nield, Wisconsin politician
- Don Penza, former mayor of Wisconsin Rapids, WI, All-American collegian football player, legendary football coach
- George Petak, Wisconsin politician
- P. Walter Petersen, Wisconsin politician
- Kimberly Plache, Wisconsin politician
- James F. Rooney, Wisconsin legislator, former chairman of the Wisconsin Waterways Commission
- Sidney A. Sage, Wisconsin politician
- Horace T. Sanders, Wisconsin politician and military leader
- M. M. Secor (Martin Mathias Secor), proprietor of M. M. Secor Trunk Company; mayor of Racine 1884–1888
- John L. Sieb, Wisconsin politician and barber
- Lawrence H. Smith, U.S. representative
- Lynn E. Stalbaum, U.S. representative
- Jacob Stoffel Jr., Wisconsin politician
- Robert L. Turner, Wisconsin legislator and Vietnam War veteran
- William L. Utley, Wisconsin politician and military leader
- John C. Wagner, Wisconsin politician and businessman
- Van H. Wanggaard, Wisconsin legislator
- Paul Weyrich, religious conservative political activist and commentator
- Philo White, U.S. diplomat

== Religion ==
- Anton Marius Andersen, Lutheran minister
- James DeKoven, Episcopal clergyman
- Francis J. Haas, Roman Catholic bishop
- Richard J. Sklba, Roman Catholic bishop
- Rose Thering, Racine Dominican sister; professor at Seton Hall University

== Other ==
- Laurel Clark, astronaut; died on reentry in her first space flight on Space Shuttle Columbia
- Ethel B. Dietrich, economist, foreign service officer
- Marguerite Davis, co-discoverer of vitamins A and B
- Cory Everson, six-time winner of Miss Olympia bodybuilding contest
- Paul P. Harris, founder of Rotary International
- William D. Lutz, linguist
- F. Don Miller, executive director of the USOC
