= Anna May Hutchison =

- Pitcher / Catcher
- Born: May 1, 1925; Louisville, Kentucky, U.S.
- Died: January 29, 1998 (aged 72); Racine, Wisconsin, U.S.
- Batted: right Threw: right

Teams
- Racine Belles (1944–1948); Muskegon Lassies (1949)

Career highlights and awards
- 2× All-Star Team (1946–1947); No-hitter game (1946); All-time, single-season record in; games pitched (1946): Single-season leader in; wins (1947) innings pitched (1947): Championship Team (1946); Four playoff appearances (1946–1949)

Anna May Hutchison ["Hutch"] (May 1, 1925 – January 29, 1998) was an American female baseball player. She was a pitcher and catcher who played from 1944 through 1949 in the All-American Girls Professional Baseball League (AAGPBL). Listed at 5 ft 7 in (1.70 m), 149 lb., she batted and threw right-handed. Sometimes she is credited as Anna Mae Hutchison (or Hutchinson).

A native of Louisville, Kentucky, Anna May Hutchison was one of the most dominant sidearm pitchers in All-American Girls Professional Baseball League history and holds the all-time record for most pitching appearances in a single season. A two-time All-Star, she pitched a no-hitter, led her team to a championship title, and topped the league in wins in a regular season. Her promising career was cut short with a succession of injuries in her throwing arm.

== Career summary ==
Hutchison grew up in Louisville and played softball in the local Girls Athletic Association (GAA) during her high school years. She later played for the Camera Corner team, who won the Louisville city championship. After that, the club was invited to participate in the regional tournament in Fort Wayne, Indiana, where an AAGPBL scout spotted her and decided to talk to her parents about joining the league. She attended to spring training in 1944 after graduating from the University of Wisconsin-Parkside and was rewarded with a contract to play in the league.

Hutchison entered the AAGPBL in 1944 with the Racine Belles, playing for them five years before joining the Muskegon Lassies (1949). She spent her first two seasons serving as a backup to Belles incumbent catcher Irene Hickson, who was a member of the team that won the first league championship in 1943. Nevertheless, Hutchison was able to make the adjustment to pitching before the 1946 season, when Leo Murphy, former Pittsburgh Pirates catcher and Belles manager, helped her to throw a fastpitch underhand delivery during spring training. She would join a pitching rotation bolstered by Doris Barr and Joanne Winter.

In 1946 Hutchison mastered the new side-arm delivery and responded with a 26–14 record and 102 strikeouts in 51 games, setting an all-time, single-season record for games pitched. She also collected more low-hit games than any pitcher in the league, while teaming up with Joanne Winter (33–9) to give Racine a strong one-two punch pitching combination in the eight-team circuit. In addition, Hutchison hurled the first nine-inning no-hitter in Belles history, a 1–0 victory over the Kenosha Comets. I pitched the first nine-inning no-hitter game by a Belles pitcher, she recalled on an interview. It was again the Kenosha Comets. I don't remember the year, but it was a tense, tense game, and we won, 1–0. Irene was catching, and she kept telling me, 'You're doing OK. Keep putting the ball where you are putting it', she added. Hutchison capped his successful pitching debut with her first All-Star selection.

Hutchison also pitched two 19-inning games in that season. The first one was a 1–1 tie against the Peoria Redwings, which was called because of darkness. Amazingly, the next day she relieved Winter and pitched three innings of shutout ball, protecting the victory for Winter while earning the save. Her other 19-inning marathon was a 1–0 defeat to the Grand Rapids Chicks, after giving two walks and a RBI-single in the half of the 19th inning. We lost, 1–0, she said. I had walked one or two girls in the 19th inning. It was one of those unfortunate things, but somebody hit a ball, and it just fell between our left fielder and center fielder, and the run scored.

The Belles finished in first place with a league-best 74–38 record, and won the semifinal round of playoffs by defeating the South Bend Blue Sox in four games. In Game 1 of the first round, Hutchison won a 17-inning pitching duel against the stellar Jean Faut. After South Bend evened the series in Game 2, Hutchison hurled a two-hitter in Game 3 and Winter held the hard-hitting Blue Sox to three singles in the final game. Racine advanced to the final round to face the defending AAGPBL champion Rockford Peaches, who have eliminated Grand Rapids in the other playoff contention. In the finals Racine beat Rockford, four to two games. Throughout the playoffs Sophie Kurys was the biggest Racine star. She led all hitters in average, stolen bases, and runs scored. The Belles also showed a great defense, notably by Edythe Perlick (LF), Eleanor Dapkus (RF), Margaret Danhauser (1B), Betty Trezza (SS) and Maddy English (3B). On the other hand, Winter collected four wins in all series, including three against Rockford, despite allowing 19 base runners in a 14-inning, 1–0 shutout victory over the Peaches in decisive Game Six. The winning run was scored by Kurys on an RBI-single by Trezza. Meanwhile, Hutchison pitched in eight of the ten playoff games and collected three of the seven wins.

Hutchison enjoyed a season highlight in 1947. She completed her 40 starts, ending with a 27–13 record and 120 strikeouts, allowing only 230 hits in 360 innings of work. She registered career-highs in wins, strikeouts and innings pitched, while leading the league with her 27 victories and innings. She also hurled 12 shutouts and made the All-Star Team for the second consecutive year. That season Racine finished with a 65–47 record, tying for second with Grand Rapids.

Hutchison was never the same pitcher again for Racine, as a result of being overworked in her first two seasons. Her strong delivery eventually caused arm problems that affected her baseball career. In 1948 she slipped to a 3–6 record in 14 games and was traded to Muskegon at the end of the season. Then, she went 8–12 in 25 games in 1949, in what would be her last season in the league.

== After baseball ==
Following her baseball career, Hutchison went on to be a respected golfer and bowler and became a longtime resident of Kenosha, Wisconsin, while working as an elementary teacher with Kenosha Unified Schools for 16 years before retiring in 1987. After that, she moved to Racine, Wisconsin.

Hutchison is part of the AAGPBL permanent display at the Baseball Hall of Fame and Museum at Cooperstown, New York, which was opened on November 5, 1988 in honor of the entire league rather than individual baseball personalities. About 150 former AAGPBL players attended the inaugural ceremony; Hutchison and her good friend and batterymate Hickson were two of them.

Hutchison died at her home in Racine at the age of 72.

== Pitching statistics ==
GP	W	L	W-L%	ERA	IP	R	ER	BB	SO
134	64	45	.587	1.84	876	265	179	252	257
