= Ruby Knezovich =

Canadian baseball player

- Catcher
- Born: March 18, 1918; Hamilton, Ontario, Canada
- Died: August 1, 1995 (aged 77); Hamilton, Ontario, Canada
- Batted: Right Threw: Right

Teams
- Racine Belles (1943–1944)

Career highlights and awards
- Canadian Baseball Hall of Fame Honorary Induction (1998)

Ruby Knezovich [Martz] (March 18, 1918 – August 1, 1995) was a Canadian catcher who played from 1943 to 1944 in the All-American Girls Professional Baseball League (AAGPBL). Listed at 5' 2", 130 lb., she batted and threw right handed.

Born in Hamilton, Ontario, Ruby Knezovich was one of the 68 players born in Canada to join the All-American Girls Professional Baseball League in its twelve-year history. Her younger sister, Daisy Junor, also played in the league.

Knezovich shared the catching duties along with Irene Hickson and Anna May Hutchison during her two seasons with the Racine Belles.

In a 17-game career, Ruby posted a batting average of .146 (6-for-41), with four runs scored, two RBI and one stolen base. As a fielder, she hauled in 29 putouts with 16 assists and turned one double play, while committing two errors in 47 total chances for a combined .957 fielding average.

In 1988 was inaugurated a permanent display at the Baseball Hall of Fame and Museum at Cooperstown, New York, that honors those who were part of the All-American Girls Professional Baseball League. Ruby Knezovich, along with the rest of the girls and the league staff, is included at the display/exhibit. Then in 1998, three years after her death, Ruby and all Canadian AAGPBL players gained honorary induction into the Canadian Baseball Hall of Fame.
