= Maltz Jupiter Theatre =

Theatre in Jupiter, Florida, United States

- Formation: 1979
- Type: Theatre group
- Location: Jupiter, Florida
- Artistic director: Andrew Kato
- Notable members: Founders and Owners: Burt Reynolds, Otto Divosta, Bud Paxson, Milton and Tamar Maltz
- Website: jupitertheatre.org

Maltz Jupiter Theatre is an American not-for-profit, professional theatre located in Jupiter, Florida, United States.

== Origins ==
The theatre was originally founded in 1979 as the Burt Reynolds Dinner Theater, owned and operated by the namesake actor. During the Dinner Theater's operating years, 1979-1996, it featured more celebrity performers than any other arts venue in Palm Beach County, including the opening season's Vanities (starring Sally Field, Tyne Daly, and Gail Strickland). Reynolds performed in three shows, directed others, and worked alongside stars such as Martin Sheen, Sarah Jessica Parker, and others.

Reynolds later renamed the building the Burt Reynolds Jupiter Theatre. He established an on-site program at the Burt Reynolds Institute for Theatre Training, where students were taught classes by celebrity performers, including Liza Minnelli and Charles Nelson Reilly.

== 1989-2000 ==
In 1989, Reynolds leased the playhouse to Richard C. Akins, who ran operations until 1996. He sold the theater to Otto Divosta that year, who leased it to the Carousel Dinner Theatre. Divosta sold the theatre in 1999 to Bud Paxson, who donated it to the Christ Fellowship Church in the same year.

== Since 2001 ==
In 2001, the Palm Beach Playhouse Inc. was formed as a non-profit organization, who purchased the building. After a full renovation, the theatre was reopened as the Maltz Jupiter Theatre in February, 2004, with a 554 seat playhouse.

In August 2005, current artistic director Andrew Kato joined the volunteer staff. In 2007, he helped the creation of facilities for the Goldner Conservatory of Performing Arts, which functions to serve students throughout the year.

In 2008, the Maltz Jupiter Theatre received the John D. and Catherine T. MacArthur Fund grant and a grant from the Roy A. Hunt Foundation to support Emerging Artists Series in Musical Theatre Playwriting, helping young writers in their growth. The Maltz Jupiter Theatre continues to receive favorable reviews from all South Florida outlets, ranging from Broadway World and Talking Broadway's international coverage, to local publications such as The Palm Beach Post, Sun Sentinel, South Florida Theatre Scene, and Palms West Monthly.
