= Jane Jacobs (baseball) =

American baseball player (1924–2015)

- Pitcher
- Born: June 16, 1924; Cuyahoga Falls, Ohio, U.S.
- Died: September 13, 2015 (aged 91); Cuyahoga Falls, Ohio, U.S.
- Batted: Right Threw: Right

Teams
- Racine Belles (1944–1945, 1947); Peoria Redwings (1946)

Career highlights and awards
- Women in Baseball – AAGPBL Permanent Display at Baseball Hall of Fame and Museum (1988)

Jane Jeanette Jacobs [Badini] (June 16, 1924 – September 13, 2015) was an American pitcher who played from 1944 through 1947 in the All-American Girls Professional Baseball League (AAGPBL). Listed at 5 ft 4 in (1.63 m), 130 lb., she batted and threw right-handed.

Jane Jacobs was not a hard thrower, but her underhand fastball fooled batters because she was a curveball pitcher. Jacobs hurled in-curve, out-curve, upshoot and a drop ball, her better pitch. Her most impressive start was having pitched a complete game-shutout one-hitter, but she fell victim to sidearm delivery when the league converted to it.

"Jake", as her teammates nicknamed her, was born in Cuyahoga Falls, Ohio, where she started playing softball at the age of 11. In 1943, she was spotted by a league's scout when she was 18, but did not sign until a year later.

Jacobs entered the league in 1944 with the Racine Belles, playing for them two years. She did not have a winning season, even though she posted a 2.82 earned run average in 1945 and 2.86 in 1945, while compiling marks of 9–16 and 7–9, respectively. The team had a surplus of talent, so she was loaned to the Peoria Redwings the next year.

In 1946, according to the new AAGPBL rules of play, the pitchers were forced to switch gradually from underhand to sidearm delivery. Jacobs made the transition, with no small effort, and led the Redwings pitchers with a 2.13 ERA, which was a career-high. Though her success was not reflected in her 6–12 record due to poor run support.

She returned to Racine in 1947, when the league adopted full sidearm pitching regulations. This time she struggled to make the additional mandatory adjustment and went 2–6 with a 2.92 ERA. Then, for the third consecutive year the league set a new rule for a strictly overhand pitching in 1948. It spelled the end of Jacobs' career. "I was afraid I'd ruin my arm," she explained with resignation.

In a four-year career, she was managed by Racine's Leo Murphy and Peoria's Bill Rodgers. She finished with a 24–43 record and a 2.65 ERA in 88 pitching appearances.

Jacobs returned to her home of Ohio, where she operated her own dry cleaning business for 40 years. She married Mario Badini in 1973, and was widowed after 16 years of marriage. Jane was diagnosed with cancer in 1994, but survived the surgery and the follow-up treatments. After recuperating from cancer, she ran a ceramics business for a long time.

She is part of Women in Baseball, a permanent display based at the Baseball Hall of Fame and Museum in Cooperstown, New York, which was unveiled in 1988 to honor the entire All-American Girls Professional Baseball League. Though she did not attend the ceremony, she traveled to Cooperstown in 2009 to see her name in the hall. I will definitely be back, said the proud AAGPBL veteran.

The native of Cuyahoga Falls, Ohio made the long pilgrimage along with a niece, her husband and their two daughters. She also extended her Cooperstown visit to the A. Bartlett Giamatti Research Center, where she both donated photos and clippings from her AAGPBL career and received copies of other photos from the Hall's archives. She even helped identify some former teammates who were unidentified in old team photos.

== Career statistics ==
Pitching

GP	W	L	W-L%	ERA	IP	H	RA	ER	BB	SO	HBP	WP	WHIP
88	24	43	.358	2.65	590	581	292	174	189	52	20	29	1.31

Batting

GP	AB	R	H	2B	3B	HR	RBI	SB	BB	SO	BA	OBP
88	204	7	24	0	0	1	9	10	11	29	.118	.214

Fielding

GP	PO	A	E	TC	DP	FA
88	20	170	19	199	2	.909
