= Gene Rose =

Gene or Eugene Rose may refer to:

- Gene Rose (American football end) (1913–1986), end for New York Giants (1936)
- Gene Rose (American football back) (1904–1979), back for Chicago Cardinals (1929-1932)
- Seraphim Rose (1934–1982), American hieromonk of the Russian Orthodox Church Outside Russia
