= Irene DeLaby =

American baseball player

- Pitcher
- Born: August 12, 1922; Chicago, Illinois, U.S.
- Died: October 6, 2012 (aged 90); Lecanto, Florida, U.S.
- Batted: Right Threw: Right

Teams
- Racine Belles (1949)

Career highlights and awards
- Women in Baseball – AAGPBL Permanent Display at Baseball Hall of Fame and Museum (since 1988)

Irene DeLaby (August 12, 1922 – October 6, 2012) was an American pitcher who played in the All-American Girls Professional Baseball League (AAGPBL). She batted and threw right handed.

Born in Chicago, Illinois, Irene DeLaby was the daughter of George and Bessie (nee Hunt) DeLaby.

Irene was 26 when she joined the league with the Racine Belles in 1949, but she did not have much of a chance to play during the season. Nevertheless, she gained some national recognition after her brief stint with Racine, earning the moniker of Champion of Florida Parks.

DeLaby was assigned to the Belles in March 1949, but being a high school teacher in Fox Lake, Illinois, she did not report until the close of school in the month of June. Then she was released after pitching two innings in an exhibition game against the Kenosha Comets, before returning to her work as a teacher.

Afterwards, DeLaby moved to Homosassa, Florida in 1989, where she developed into a dedicated and enthusiastic volunteer for the Florida State Parks Service, beginning at Fort Cooper State Park in Inverness, Florida, while traveling the state encouraging and supporting volunteers. As a result, she contributed with more than 27,000 hours to the park system, becoming the first Florida parks volunteer to surpass the 10,000 volunteer hours mark.

In 1992, when Hurricane Andrew hit Florida severely, DeLaby was instrumental in forming the first-ever Friends of Florida State Parks association, and then in 2000, she received the National Volunteer Service Award from the National Recreation and Parks Association. After that, in 2004 she was awarded the national Take Pride in America Award for volunteerism.

In between, the then-Florida Governor Jeb Bush announced in 2002 the creation of the Destination Florida commission. The purpose of the commission was to evaluate Florida's competitive position in attracting retirees and to make recommendations for the future that would make the state more friendly for retired people. DeLaby became part of the commission, along with Otto Divosta, Pedro J. Greer and Don Shula, among other personalities.

At this point, DeLaby earned the respect of locals and visitors for many years. In fact, she wrote a regular monthly column for the Citrus County Chronicle for a long time, encouraging any reader to visit her state parks, while volunteering in them as well.

In addition, DeLaby wrote and edited the newsletters for the Homosassa Springs park, as well as for a statewide volunteer newsletter, two citizen support organizations, two chamber of commerce newsletters, while contributing for the Division of Recreation and Parks Update newsletter and the Leadership Citrus newsletter.

Irene DeLaby died in 2012 in Lecanto, Florida at the age of 90.

The All-American Girls Professional Baseball League folded in 1954, but there is now a permanent display at the Baseball Hall of Fame and Museum at Cooperstown, New York since November 5, 1988 that honors those who were part of this unique experience. Irene, along with the rest of the league's girls and staff, is included at the display/exhibit.
