= Thomas Corbett =

Thomas or Tom Corbett may refer to:

- Tom Corbett (born 1949), American politician
- Tom Corbett, Space Cadet, the main character in a series of Tom Corbett – Space Cadet stories
- Thomas Corbett (Indian Army officer) (1888–1981), British Indian Army officer
- Thomas Corbett, 2nd Baron Rowallan (1895–1977), Chief Scout of the British Commonwealth and Empire and Governor of Tasmania
- Thomas Lorimer Corbett (1854–1910), British Conservative politician
- Thomas Corbett (Lincolnshire MP) (1796–1868), English member of parliament
- Thomas Corbett (secretary of the Admiralty), British Treasury official and politician
- Thomas P. Corbett (1914–1995), American politician and jurist
- Tom Corbett, character in Above Us the Waves
- Boston Corbett (Thomas H. Corbett, 1832–1894), Union Army soldier who shot and killed John Wilkes Booth
