= Washington Park High School =

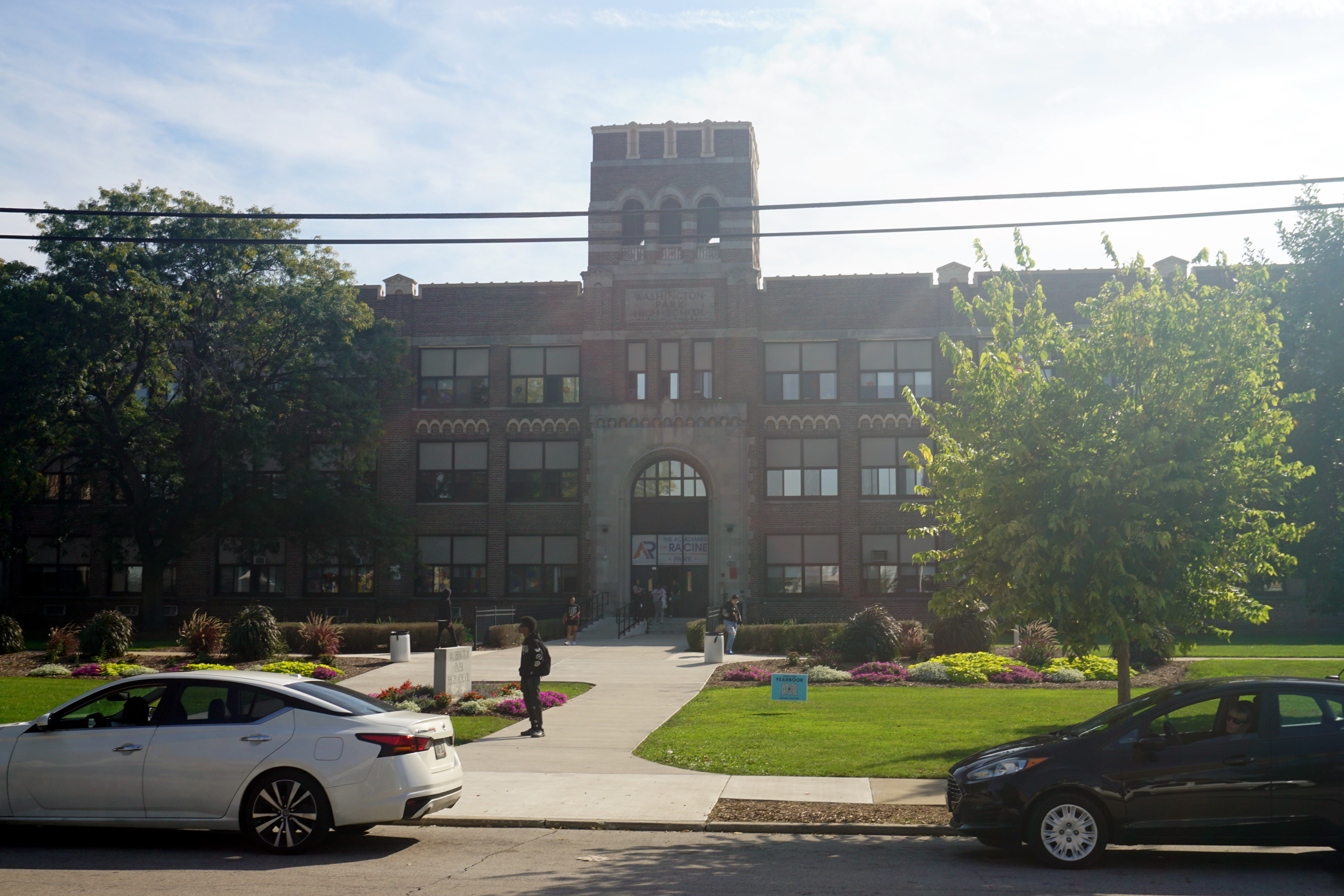

Location
- 1901 12th Street; Racine, Wisconsin; United States; 42°43′5.64″N 87°48′16.6″W

Information
- Type: Public secondary
- Established: 1928
- School district: Racine Unified School District
- Teaching staff: 90.83 (FTE)
- Grades: 9 - 12
- Enrollment: 1,150 (2023-2024)
- Student to teacher ratio: 12.66
- Colors: Orange , blue and white
- Mascot: Panthers
- Yearbook: Kipikawi
- Website: https://www.rusd.org/o/phs

Washington Park High School (also known as Park or Racine Park High School) is a public, four-year high school in Racine, Wisconsin, United States, with an enrollment of 1,500 students. Its school colors are blue and orange. The school's mascot, the panther, was adopted by the Class of 1949, reportedly because of a nearby Native American effigy mound in the shape of a panther. It is a part of the Racine Unified School District.

== History ==
Kipikawi, Racine High School yearbook, 1920, Racine, Wisconsin

Racine High School Senior Annual 1909, includes list of all graduates 1857-1909

The school traces its roots to 1852 when Racine High School, one of the first public schools in Wisconsin, opened. In 1926, the Racine School Board decided to replace Racine High School with a new school that eventually became Park. The new Washington Park High School opened in 1928. The north side of Racine also received its own high school the same year when land donated by the malted milk magnate William Horlick was used by the Racine School board for another high school named in Horlick's honor.

The school building was designed by the Racine architect J. Mandor Matson. The school mascot is the panther.

Much of the history and memorabilia (including art, awards and traditions) from Racine High School were moved to Park. The statue of Joan of Arc that was donated by the Racine High School Class of 1904 is displayed in Park's foyer. The school's newspaper, The Beacon (a reference to Racine's Wind Point Lighthouse), and the school yearbook Kipikawi (a Native American name for the Root River), were also both carried over from Racine High School.

== Athletics ==
Park's sports teams compete in the Wisconsin Interscholastic Athletic Association (WIAA) Southeast Conference with schools from Racine, Kenosha and southern Milwaukee, including Park's long-time crosstown rivals Horlick High School and Case High School, the other major high schools in Racine.

=== Rivalry with William Horlick ===
Park has a long-standing rivalry with William Horlick athletic teams, known locally as "The Great Rivalry" or more informally as "Park/Horlick". The rivalry began in 1928, when the two schools opened. The rivalry is most notable between the schools' football teams who have played at least once every year since 1928.

=== State championships ===
Sport	Years
Boys' baseball	1993
Boys' basketball	1943
Girls' basketball	1997
Boys' cross country	1948, 1949
Boys' golf	1931, 1947, 1948, 1958, 1968, 1970, 1973
Gymnastics (combined Racine team)	1997, 1998, 2004
Football	1988, 2005
Boys' tennis	1931
Boys' track	1974, 1997, 1998, 2000
Girls' track	1978
Wrestling	1967, 1969

== School song ==
Hail to thee, Park High.
Hail thy orange and blue.
Thy light shall guide us,
Thy beacon bright and true.
We'll serve thee always.
This our pledge shall be:
Park High, forever,
Hail, hail, hail to thee

== Notable alumni ==
- Kevin Barry – NFL offensive lineman with the Green Bay Packers and Houston Texans
- Annastasia Batikis – AAGPBL outfielder with the Racine Belles
- Manny S. Brown – member of the Wisconsin State Assembly
- Caron Butler – NBA professional basketball player
- John Clay – NFL running back for the Pittsburgh Steelers.
- Scott C. Fergus – member of the Wisconsin State Assembly
- Kenneth L. Greenquist – member of the Wisconsin Senate
- Welton John "Jack" Harris – Fullback Green Bay Packers
- Ben Hecht – screenwriter, director, producer, playwright, journalist, and novelist
- Solomon Hutcherson – MMA and UFC fighter.
- Abdul Jeelani (né Gary Cole) – NBA small forward with the Dallas Mavericks and Portland Trail Blazers
- Maj. John L. Jerstad (1918–1943) – World War II Major, U.S. Army Air Force Pilot and Medal of Honor recipient
- Maj. Gen. Richard G. Kaiser ('83) – Major General, U.S. Army (retired)
- Travis King – U.S. Army Private Second Class, defected to North Korea on 18 July 2023.
- Fredric March (1897–1975) – two-time Academy Award and Tony Award-winning stage and film actor
- Barbara McNair – singer and actress
- Eric Morones, saxophonist and composer, lead alto saxophonist for Brian Setzer Orchestra
- Brent Moss – NFL running back with the Miami Dolphins and St. Louis Rams
- Norm Nelson – American stock car racer
- Edward Peil Sr., actor
- LaTonya Sims – professional basketball player and UW-Madison basketball player, Gatorade Player of the Year
- William H. Upham (1841–1924) – 18th Governor of Wisconsin
- Fred Venturelli – NFL kicker with the Chicago Bears
- Jerry Woods – NFL defensive back with the Detroit Lions and Green Bay Packers
- Al Zupek – NFL fullback

== See also ==
- The World's Best Prom: An award-winning documentary and forthcoming feature-length documentary about high school prom in Racine, Wisconsin.
