= Mary Ellen Kimball =

American baseball player (1929–2025)

- Outfielder / Pitcher
- Born: April 1, 1929; Kalamazoo, Michigan, U.S.
- Died: December 17, 2024 (aged 95)
- Batted: Right Threw: Right

Teams
- Racine Belles (1948)

Career highlights and awards
- Women in Baseball – AAGPBL Permanent Display at the Baseball Hall of Fame and Museum (since 1988)

Mary Ellen Kimball Purdham (April 1, 1929 – December 17, 2024) was an All-American Girls Professional Baseball League player. Listed at 5' 7 ", 148 lb., she batted and threw right handed.

Born in Kalamazoo, Michigan, Mary Ellen Kimball joined the league with the Racine Belles club in its 1948 season, but did not have much playing time. She was signed as an outfielder and Racine later tried to turn her into a pitcher. In a two-game career, she went hitless in five at bats and did not have a pitching record. She later married and moved to Irons, Michigan.

The All-American Girls Professional Baseball League folded in 1954, but there is a permanent display at the Baseball Hall of Fame and Museum at Cooperstown, New York, since November 5, 1988, that honors the entire league rather than any individual figure.

Kimball died on December 17, 2024, at the age of 95.
