= Leola Brody =

American baseball player

- First base / Outfield / Pitcher
- Born: May 30, 1922; Chicago, Illinois, U.S.
- Died: December 14, 1997 (aged 75); Long Grove, Illinois, U.S.
- Batted: Right Threw: Right

Teams
- Racine Belles (1943)

Career highlights and awards
- Women in Baseball – AAGPBL Permanent Display at Baseball Hall of Fame and Museum (since 1988)

Leola Mae Hay (née Brody; May 30, 1922 – December 14, 1997) was an All-American Girls Professional Baseball League player. Brody batted and threw right handed. She was nicknamed Bubbles.

Born in Chicago, Illinois, Brody joined the league in its inaugural season of 1943. Brody was assigned to the Racine Belles, even though she did not appear in a game for the team. After that, she played fastpitch softball for the Bloomer Girls club based in Chicago.

Following her playing retirement, Brody taught bowling and bowled in men's leagues. Throughout the 1970s, she also worked as a physical therapist at a hospital in Wetumpka, Alabama.

The AAGPBL folded in 1954, but there is a permanent display at the Baseball Hall of Fame and Museum at Cooperstown, New York, since November 5, 1988, that honors the entire league rather than any individual figure.

Brody died in 1997 in Long Grove, Illinois, at the age of 75.
