= Percy H. Batten =

American industrialist (1877–1960)

Percy Haight Batten (January 12, 1877 – April 8, 1960) was an American industrialist and founder of Twin Disc, Inc.

== Early life and education ==
Percy H. Batten was born on January 12, 1877, to John H. and Ida (nee: Haight) Batten in Naperville, Illinois. His father was a state’s attorney for Illinois and later the DuPage County judge. He began high school attending Kemper Hall, a preparatory school for boys in Davenport, Iowa, where he earned the gold medal for best general record his first year. He then transferred to the Chicago Manual Training School where he graduated. He attended college at Purdue University where he was a member of the Phi Delta Theta fraternity and graduated in 1898 with a degree in mechanical engineering.

== Career ==
Early Career

After graduating college, Batten accepted a position with the Chicago & North Western railroad company. In 1903, he was appointed as general manager with the Chicago Motor Vehicle Company, in Harvey, Illinois, where he was granted a patent for power installation on self-propelled vehicles in 1905. After that, he worked at American Brake Shoe & Foundry Co. and then to Featherstone Foundry and Machine Co. as a superintendent.

In 1915 he was the works manager for Wallis Tractor Co. when they relocated from Cleveland, Ohio to Racine, Wisconsin. It was in Racine that he became acquainted with Arthur B. Modine, vice president of Perfex Radiator Company at that time, and inventor Thomas L. Fawick. Fawick had designed a new type of clutch that he presented to Batten and Modine, and soon after, Batten had it adopted into the Wallis Tractor Company’s production line.

Twin Disc Inc.

In 1918, the three men founded the Twin Disc Clutch Company at 14th and Clark Streets in Racine. Fawick was initially named president and was succeeded by Batten after the first year. Modine left to form his own company, Modine Manufacturing. In 1921, Batten quit Wallis Tractor to focus on Twin Disc full time, taking no pay for a period just to keep the company running. In 1928, Wallis Tractor merged with Massey-Harris and became Twin Disc’s largest customer, with Minneapolis-Moline following in second. In 1936, Batten traveled to Sweden and secured a contract with AB Ljungströms Ångturbin Co. for exclusive rights to manufacture and distribute Lysholm-Smith torque converters and hydraulic couplings.

In 1940, he went into a partnership with friends A.J. Horlick and H.F. Johnson to form the Batten Realty Company to finance the construction of the Horlick-Racine Airport, now named John H. Batten Airport. In 1948, Percy’s son John H. Batten II was named president and Percy was elected to chairman of the board, a position he held until his death. At the time of his death, he was also director of the American Bank & Trust Co. and on the board of directors for Modine Manufacturing.

== Personal life and death ==
On December 3, 1904, Percy married Eliza “Lisa” Yaekel Stockton (1878 – 1966) of Lafayette, Indiana, in Chicago. Together, they had 3 children: Paul S. (1909 – 1911), John H. III (1912 – 1989), and Alice (1913 – 1957).

In 1947, he received the Golden Legionaire Certificate from Phi Delta Theta and in 1949 he received an honorary doctorate degree from Purdue University.

He was a member of St. Luke's Hospital board of trustees, a founder of the Racine Community Chest, a contributor to St. Luke's Episcopal Church, past chapter president of the Izaak Walton League, past president of the Racine Manufacturers Association, a member of the University of Wisconsin Foundation, a member of the Somerset Club, and a member of the Racine Country Club. The board room at the EAA Aviation Center in Oshkosh is named in his honor.

He owned a summer home on Lake Owen.

He died on April 8, 1960, and is buried at Graceland Cemetery in Racine, WI.
