= Rita Corrigan =

American baseball player

Rita Corrigan was an American pitcher who played in the All-American Girls Professional Baseball League (AAGPBL). She was born in Cleveland, Ohio.

Corrigan was assigned to the Racine Belles during its 1943 season. She did not have individual records or some information was incomplete.

The AAGPBL folded in 1954, but there is a permanent display at the Baseball Hall of Fame and Museum at Cooperstown, New York, since November 5, 1988, that honors the entire league rather than any individual figure.
