= Charlotte Smith (baseball) =

American baseball player (born 1919)

- Utility player
- Born: 1919 (age 106–107); Chattanooga, Tennessee, U.S.
- Bats: Right Throws: Right

Teams
- Racine Belles (1943–1944)

Career highlights and awards
- Championship team (1943); All-Star Game (1943)

Charlotte Smith (born 1919) was an infielder and outfielder who played in the All-American Girls Professional Baseball League (AAGPBL). Listed at 5 ft 6 in (1.68 m), 130 lb., Smith batted and threw right-handed. She was born in Chattanooga, Tennessee.

The daughter of a Minor league pitcher, Smith was one of the original sixty players signed by the All-American Girls Professional Baseball League. She was also one of 10 players hailed from Tennessee who made the league in its 12 years of existence. League play officially began on May 30, 1943 with the teams Kenosha Comets, Racine Belles, Rockford Peaches and South Bend Blue Sox. Each team was made up of fifteen girls. Smith passed the test and was assigned to the Racine team.

From 1943 to 1944, Smith played at outfield, first base and shortstop for the Belles. She hit a .316 batting average in her rookie season, driving in 18 runs while scoring 36 times in just 53 games. A fast runner, she stole 54 bases to rank eight in the league.

The first AAGPBL Championship Series pitted first-half winner Racine against Kenosha, second-half champ. In the best-of-five series, Racine swept Kenosha in three games to claim the first championship in the league's history. Smith also appeared in the first All-Star Game, which coincidentally was the first night game played at Wrigley Field (July 1, 1943). The game was played under temporary lights between two teams composed of Blue Sox and Peaches players against Comets and Belles players.

== Batting statistics ==
GP	AB	R	H	2B	3B	HR	RBI	SB	BB	SO	BA	OBP
130	353	57	85	2	2	0	33	93	39	18	.241	.316
