= Lucille Stone =

American baseball player

- Shortstop
- Born: December 26, 1925; Boston, Massachusetts, U.S.
- Died: May 20, 2016 (aged 90); Buzzards Bay, Massachusetts, U.S.
- Batted: Right Threw: Right

Teams
- Racine Belles (1945); South Bend Blue Sox (1945)

Lucille Richards (née Stone; December 26, 1925 – May 20, 2016) was an All-American Girls Professional Baseball League shortstop who played for the Racine Belles and South Bend Blue Sox during the 1946 AAGPBL season. Listed at 5' 4", 130 lb., Stone batted and threw right handed. She was dubbed ´Lou´ by her friends and teammates.

Born in Boston, Massachusetts, Stone worked in the shipyards before joining the AAGPBL in 1945. She was selected to fill in the gap for Racine at shortstop and later was sent to South Bend, as the league usually shifted players as needed to help teams stay afloat, but she never lived up to the expectations around her.

Stone posted a batting average of .040 (2-for-50) with a .158 on-base percentage in 19 games, driving in two runs while scoring once.

After baseball, she married Joe Richards and they had two girls, Jacqueline and Judith. Alongside her husband Joe, she coached for the Holbrook Little League Rotary Club baseball team during 25 years. Besides, she worked for the Wallace Bus Company for the Holbrook Public School System, driving her bus for 20 years before retiring.

Lou Stone Richards is part of the AAGPBL permanent display at the National Baseball Hall of Fame and Museum at Cooperstown, New York, which was opened on November 5, 1988 in honor of the entire league rather than individual baseball personalities.

She died in 2016 in Buzzards Bay, Massachusetts, at the age of 90.
