= Elizabeth Emry =

American baseball player

- Shortstop / Pitcher
- Born: January 20, 1923; Manistique, Michigan, U.S.
- Died: April 18, 1995 (aged 72); New Port Richey, Florida, U.S.
- Batted: Right Threw: Right
- Stats at Baseball Reference

Teams
- Racine Belles (1945–1946)

Career highlights and awards
- Championship team (1946); Women in Baseball – AAGPBL Permanent Display at Baseball Hall of Fame and Museum (1988)

Elizabeth "Betty" Emry (January 20, 1923 – April 18, 1995) was an infielder and pitcher who played in the All-American Girls Professional Baseball League (AAGPBL). Listed at 5 ft 4 in (1.63 m), 130 lb, she batted and threw right-handed.

A member of a championship team, Emry filled in at infield and pitched during her two-year stint in the All-American Girls Professional Baseball League.

Born in Manistique, Michigan, Emry played for the Keller Girls softball team in Detroit before joining the league with the Racine Belles in the 1945 season.

She started her career at shortstop, but was converted to a pitcher because of her strong throwing arm. She then posted a 7–4 record and a 2.15 earned run average in 15 games for the 1946 Belles champion team, even though she was still hampered by a knee injury. She also allowed three unearned runs in four innings of a postseason game, but did not have a decision.

After baseball, Emry went to work at Briggs Aircraft plant close to end of World War II.

She is part of Women in Baseball, a permanent display based at the Baseball Hall of Fame and Museum in Cooperstown, New York, which was unveiled in 1988 to honor the entire All-American Girls Professional Baseball League.

Emry died in New Port Richey, Florida, at the age of 73.

== Career statistics ==
Batting

GP	AB	R	H	2B	3B	HR	RBI	SB	BB	SO	BA	OBP
134	365	24	65	1	0	0	34	11	43	42	.147	.238

Pitching

GP	W	L	W-L%	ERA	IP	H	RA	ER	BB	SO	HBP	WP	WHIP
15	7	4	.636	2.15	91	85	39	22	24	16	11	5	1.10

Fielding

GP	PO	A	E	TC	DP	FA
95	151	173	27	351	4	.921
