= Twin Disc =

Power transmission equipment company

Twin Disc, Inc.
- Type: Public
- Traded as: Nasdaq: TWIN; Russell 2000 Component
- Industry: Manufacturing
- Founded: 1918; 108 years ago, in Racine, Wisconsin, U.S.
- Founder: P. H. Batten, Thomas Fawick, Arthur B. Modine
- Headquarters: Milwaukee, Wisconsin, United States
- Area served: Worldwide
- Key people: John H. Batten (president, CEO); Michael C. Smiley (chairman)
- Brands: Arneson Surface Drives; Technodrive; ROLLA; Express Joystick System; Express Positioning; Quickshift
- Subsidiaries: Katsa Oy; Veth Propulsion
- Website: twindisc.com

Twin Disc, Inc. designs, manufactures, and distributes power transmission equipment for a wide range of applications, including marine, off-road vehicle, and industrial. The company was founded in 1918 to manufacture clutches for farm tractors. It is now a worldwide company with subsidiaries or sales offices in Asia, Europe, North America, Oceania, and South America.

== History ==
=== Founding ===
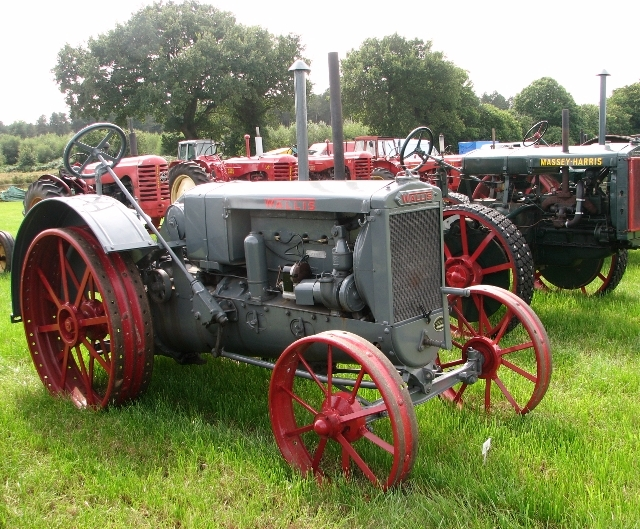
A Wallis 20-30 tractor equipped with a Twin Disc clutch

In 1915, veteran of the American railroad and manufacturing sector, Percy Haight Batten arrived in Racine, Wisconsin to assist in the running of the newly created Wallis Tractor Company. During his time in Racine, Batten was introduced to Arthur B. Modine, a local engineer and founder of Modine Manufacturing. Through his connection with Modine, Batten became acquainted with inventor and engineer Thomas Fawick. Fawick, who had relocated to southeastern Wisconsin from Sioux Falls, South Dakota and recently designed a revolutionary "twin-disc" clutch for use in tractors and other heavy farm equipment. After testing Fawick's new clutch design and subsequently encouraging its use in all new Wallis tractors, Batten, Fawick, and Modine incorporated Twin Disc Clutch Company in September of 1918 with Fawick serving as President, Batten as Vice-President, and Modine as Secretary and charter director. Batten officially took over the position of President in 1925.

=== Early years (1920s agricultural recession and the Great Depression) ===
The early years of Twin Disc's existence were defined by intense fluctuations in the American agricultural sector, nearly destroying the company in the process. As a result of the instability in the agricultural world during the 1920s Twin Disc made efforts to diversify, expanding into logging, mining, oil, and other industries where heavy industrial equipment was needed.

In response to the Good Roads Movement occurring in America during the 1920s, Twin Disc expanded into the roadbuilding world, recognizing that the same powertrain issues that plagued tractors of the time were also affecting the machinery required to construct roads. The T.L Smith Company of Milwaukee, Wisconsin and The Barber-Greene Company of Aurora, Illinois were among the first roadbuilding companies to adopt Twin Disc Clutches.

At the same time, discovery of massive oil reserves in Texas and Oklahoma during the early 1920s prompted Twin Disc to expand into the burgeoning oil market. By the late 1930s, Twin Disc clutches had become a staple of oil fields across America, their profitability playing a strong role in the company's ability to survive the Great Depression.

Twin Disc introduced its first line of marine clutches during the early 1930s following a long development process starting in 1924. During the 1930s, Twin Disc's market for marine clutches was limited mostly to small, light vessels that operated at a low RPM such as small fishing boats, pleasure craft, and work boats.

=== The Second World War ===
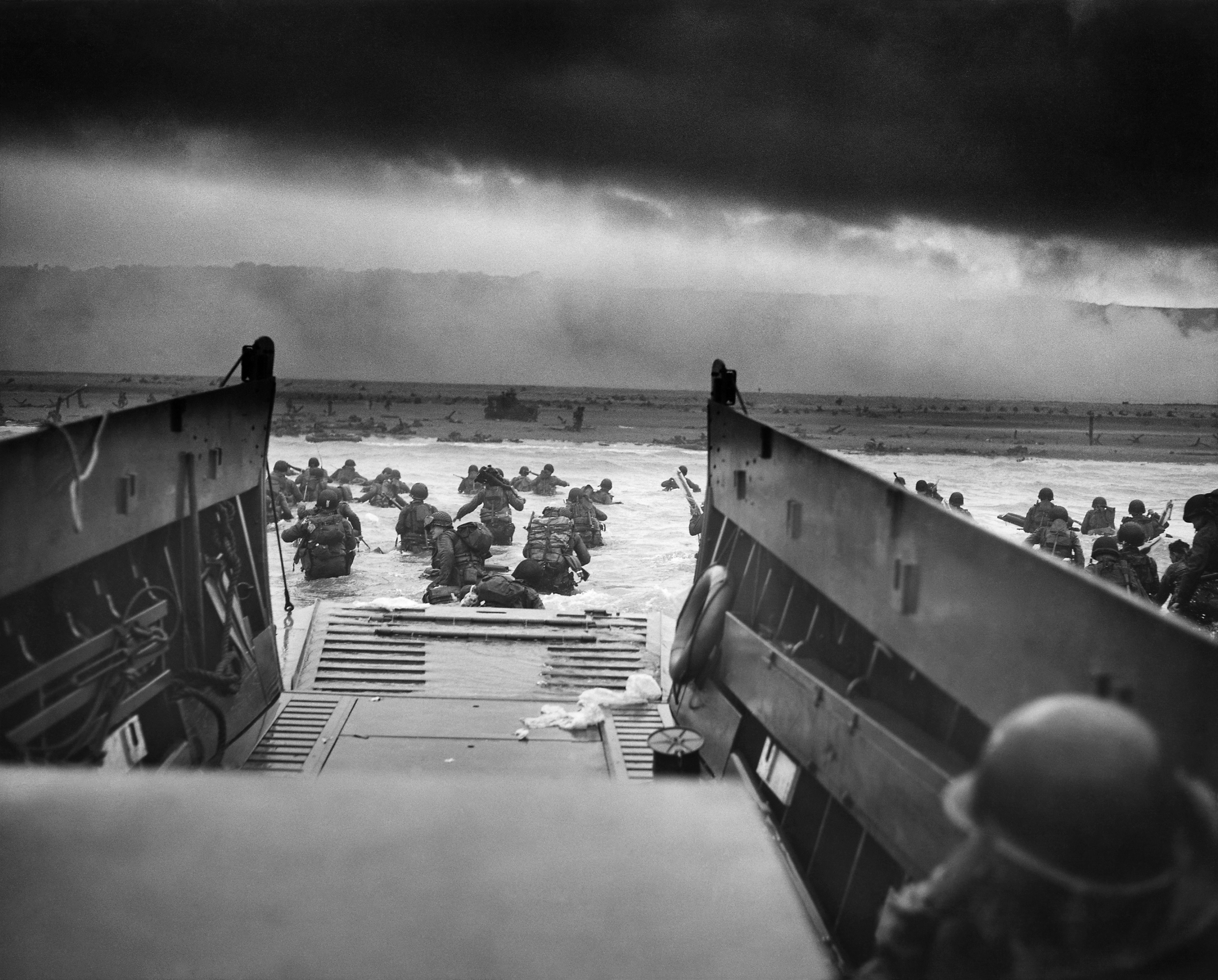
A Twin Disc equipped LCVP (Landing Craft, Vehicle, Personnel) from the U.S. Coast Guard-manned USS Samuel Chase disembarks troops of Company A, 16th Infantry, 1st Infantry Division (the Big Red One) wading onto the Fox Green section of Omaha Beach (Calvados, Basse-Normandie, France) on the morning of June 6, 1944.

During the Second World War, Twin Disc was contracted by the United States Government to produce nearly 100,000 marine gears for assorted military craft including the Landing Craft Vehicle and Personnel (LCVP), Landing Craft Mechanized (LCM), and Landing Craft Tank (LCT) famously used by Allied Forces during the landings in Normandy as a part of Operation Overlord as well at the battles of Iwo Jima and Okinawa in the Pacific Theatre.

By 1942, Twin Disc had also secured a contract to produce T-10010 torque converters for the M4 and M6 high-speed artillery tractors manufactured by the nearby Milwaukee based Allis-Chalmers tractor company.

In September of 1943, Twin Disc was awarded the Army-Navy "E" Award with four stars for "Excellence in Production" during the course of the war.

=== Postwar expansion ===
John Henry Batten was appointed President and Chief Executive Officer in 1948, succeeding his father P.H. Batten and becoming the third person and second member of the Batten family to lead Twin Disc Clutch Company.

Under the leadership of John H. Batten, Twin Disc entered a partnership with the Japanese Niigata Converter Co., Ltd. (now Hitachi Nico Transmission Co) in 1952. The partnership between the two firms has lasted over 70 years.

In the mid 1950s Twin Disc broke into the rail market, providing the first three-stage torque converter for an American locomotive. Internationally, Twin Disc provided torque converters for rail equipment in Belgium, Hong Kong, and the United Kingdom. Twin Disc torque converters (formerly made under license in the United Kingdom which became their only European Division known as the British Twin Disc Company Limited of Strood in Rochester Kent who specialized in agricultural tractors, forestry skidders and forklift trucks. Later production moved to Rolls-Royce) these were fitted to the British Rail Class 125 diesel multiple units and some export diesel locomotives, e.g. NZR TR class.

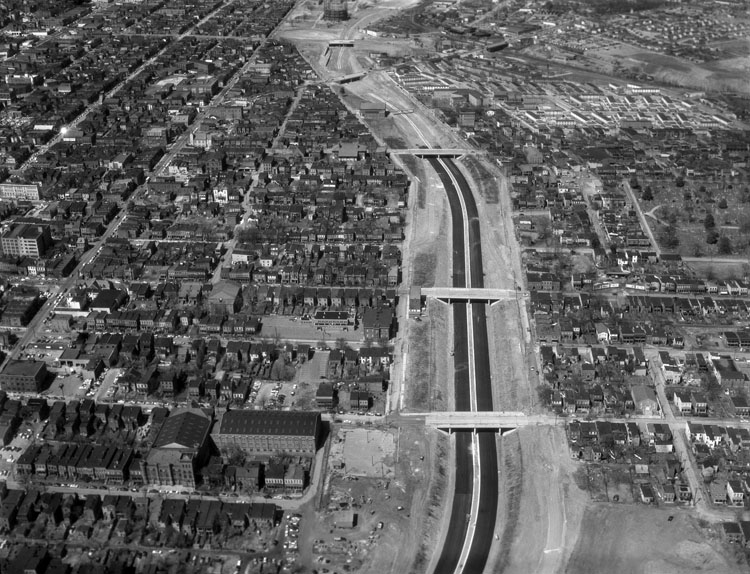
Construction of Interstate 95 during the late 1950s.

As a result of increased demand for roadbuilding equipment spurred by the Federal-Aid Highway Act of 1956, Twin Disc opened a second location in Racine in 1957, providing the company with over 90,000 square-feet of floor space for production in addition to the existing Racine and Rockford plants that had been used during the war.

Twin Disc Clutch Belgium S.A. begins operations in a new facility in Nivelles, Belgium in 1962, producing Twin Disc products for sale in Europe.

In response to its diversification in products, Twin Disc Clutch Company changed its name to Twin Disc, Incorporated, in 1967.

=== Acquisition milestones ===
- In 1968, the company acquired Paragon Gear Works, based out of Taunton, Massachusetts. Paragon manufactured marine transmissions for pleasure craft.
- In 1992, the company acquired the rights to produce and distribute Arneson Surface Drives.
- In 2004, the company acquired Rolla SP Propellers SA, a Swiss based propeller manufacturer.
- In 2007, the company acquired BCS, an Italian company that manufactures boat management systems.
- In 2018, the company acquired Veth Propulsion, a marine propulsion company based out of Rotterdam, Netherlands. Veth manufactures azimuth thrusters, a product not previously produced by Twin Disc.
- In 2024, the company acquired the Finnish company Katsa Oy based out of Tampere, Finland. Katsa designs and manufactures power transmission components and gearboxes.
