= Daisy Junor =

Canadian baseball player and golfer

- Outfield
- Born: July 10, 1919; Regina, Saskatchewan, Canada
- Died: April 29, 2012 (aged 92); Regina, Saskatchewan, Canada
- Batted: Left Threw: Left
- Stats at Baseball Reference

Teams
- South Bend Blue Sox (1946–1948); Springfield Sallies (1948); Fort Wayne Daisies (1949)

Career highlights and awards
- Saskatchewan Sports Hall of Fame (1989)

Daisy Junor [nee Knezovich] (July 10, 1919 – April 29, 2012) was a Canadian outfielder who played in the All-American Girls Professional Baseball League (AAGPBL). Listed at 5' 6", 140 lb., she batted and threw left-handed.

A line-drive hitter and a fine defensive player, outfielder Daisy Junor was one of the 68 girls from Canada who played in the All-American Girls Professional Baseball League during its 12-year history. Her elder sister, Ruby Knezovich, also played in the league.

Daisy was one of four children born into the family of Chris and Marina Knezovich. She was born and raised in Regina and lived her entire life in the province of Saskatchewan, with the exception of many winters she spent with her spouse Dave Junor in Mesa, Arizona.

As a line-drive hitter and speedy base runner, Junor was also a player at all three outfield positions, playing mainly as a center fielder for three different teams during her four seasons in the league.

She entered the league in 1946 with the South Bend Blue Sox, playing for them two and a half years before joining the Springfield Sallies (1948) and the Fort Wayne Daisies (1949). Her most productive season came in her rookie year, when she posted career-highs in games played (99), runs (30), hits (60), RBIs (22) and stolen bases (41), while ranking 10th among all outfielders with 17 assists.

After returning to Regina, Junor became an accomplished bowler and golfer. From there, she was a member of the provincial bowling team that represented Saskatchewan in the Western Canada Five Pin Bowling Championships three times, winning both city and provincial titles. In addition, she won five golf club championships, two city championships and a provincial senior ladies golf title.

In 1988, Junor received further recognition when she became part of Women in Baseball, a permanent display based at the Baseball Hall of Fame and Museum in Cooperstown, New York, which was unveiled to honor the entire All-American Girls Professional Baseball League.

During her life, she was also honoured several times in recognition of her outstanding contribution to sport regionally, nationally and internationally, gaining inductions into the Saskatchewan Sports Hall of Fame (1989), the Canadian Baseball Hall of Fame and Museum (1998), the Regina Sports Hall of Fame (2004), and the Saskatchewan Baseball Hall of Fame in North Battleford.

Shortly before her death in 2012, the City of Regina honoured Daisy with the naming of Junor Drive in northwest Regina.

== Career statistics ==
Batting

GP	AB	R	H	2B	3B	HR	RBI	SB	TB	BB	SO	BA	OBP	SLG
296	847	70	129	10	3	0	51	77	145	81	125	.152	.226	.171

Fielding

GP	PO	A	E	TC	DP	FA
277	455	27	15	497	3	.979
