= Agnes Zurowski =

Canadian baseball player

Agnes Zurowski (February 21, 1920 – June 25, 2013) was a pitcher for the All-American Girls Professional Baseball League (AAGPBL) in 1945. She both threw and batted right-handed.

== Early life and family ==
She was born on a family farm, five miles north of Edenwold, Saskatchewan in Canada. Her parents were Maria Theresia (née Kwasnicki) and Leon Zurowski. They were both immigrants from the Bukovina region of Austria-Hungary. They were known for being the first Catholics to settle in the district, arriving in 1907, just two years after the creation of the province of Saskatchewan.

== Pre-league baseball ==
Before joining the AAGPBL, she played for the Regina Bombers. In 1940 and 1941, she played in the Canadian Championship. In 1944, while she was playing for the Bombers, the team won the city championship.

== Baseball league ==
Zurowski played professional baseball in the league for two teams: the Racine Belles and the Fort Wayne Daisies, both in 1945. She was signed up by league President Max Carey along with six other Canadian baseball players in 1945. Together with Marie Menheer, Zurowski made her debut for Racine on the road in Kenosha, Wisconsin. As reported by the Racine Journal Times, "Zurowski was the losing pitcher, although she only survived into the third inning. The Comets slammed 10 hits from her offerings, and she saw six runs cross the plate before giving up to Menheer, a Kenosha native, who passed out five more safeties." The team was defeated by the Kenosha Comets, 12-2.

The next game she appeared in was the fourth inning against the South Bend Blue Sox. Agnes surrendered a further five runs (including a home run) in the 15-3 loss. Those two performances resulted in her being put on waivers by the Belles; she was then put on the roster for use in long relief by the Fort Wayne Daisies. All in all, she pitched 12 innings in four games, surrendered 17 earned runs and issued nine bases on balls with two strikeouts.

== Post-league-baseball ==
After her professional baseball career, Zurowski went back to Canada and pitched for the Edmonton Mortons. In 1988, its 1945–52 roster was inducted into the Softball Alberta Hall of Fame. In 1991, Zurowski was inducted into the Saskatchewan Baseball Hall of Fame.

== Post-baseball career ==
She worked at Regina's Army & Navy Department Store for 48 years. She retired in 1989.

== Pitching records ==
Year	G	IP	R	ER	ERA	BB	SO	HB	WP	W	L	PCT
1945	4	12	19	17	-	9	2	0	0	0	1	.000

== Batting record ==
Year	G	AB	R	H	2B	3B	HR	RBI	SB	BB	SO	AVG
1945	4	5	-	-	-	-	-	-	-	-	-	.000
