= Fern Ferguson =

American baseball player (1924–2018)

Fern E. Ferguson
- Pitcher
- Born: June 9, 1924
- Died: November 23, 2018 (aged 94)
- Batted: Right Threw: Right

Teams
- Racine Belles (1945)

Career highlights and awards
- Women in Baseball – AAGPBL Permanent Display at the Baseball Hall of Fame and Museum (unveiled in 1988)

Fern E. Ferguson (June 9, 1924 – November 23, 2018) was an All-American Girls Professional Baseball League player. She was from Wayland, Missouri.

== Career ==
Ferguson joined the Racine Belles club in the 1945 season and was assigned as a pitcher. She posted a 4.90 ERA in 11 innings of work, allowing 10 runs (six earned) on 12 hits and nine walks without strikeouts and did not have a decision. Additional information is incomplete because there are no records available at the time of the request.

== Recognitions and awards ==
In 1988 was inaugurated a permanent display at the Baseball Hall of Fame and Museum at Cooperstown, New York, that honors those who were part of the All-American Girls Professional Baseball League. Fern Ferguson, along with the rest of the girls and the league staff, is included at the display/exhibit.
