= Marie Menheer =

American baseball player

- Pitcher
- Born: July 28, 1924; Kenosha, Wisconsin, U.S.
- Died: February 4, 2003 (aged 78); Tampa, Florida, U.S.
- Batted: Right Threw: Right

Teams
- Racine Belles (1945)

Marie Menheer [Zoromsky] (July 28, 1924 – February 4, 2003) was a pitcher who played in the All-American Girls Professional Baseball League (AAGPBL). Listed at 5' 5". 142 lb., Menheer batted and threw right handed. She was born in Kenosha, Wisconsin.

Marie Menheer did not have much of an opportunity to play in her only season in the league. Menheer was assigned to the Racine Belles in the 1945 season and made a pitching appearance for them. She entered the game as a reliever for Agnes Zurowski and hurled six innings of shutout ball. As a hitter, she went 0-for-3. Racine lost to the Kenosha Comets, 12–2, while Zurowski was credited with the loss.

Afterwards, Menheer married Brone Zoromsky and they had three sons. Marie was a longtime resident of Haines City, Florida, where she became the owner and operator of Buddy's L.P. Gas Service.

She died in 2003 in Tampa, Florida, at the age of 78.

In 1988 was inaugurated a permanent display at the Baseball Hall of Fame and Museum at Cooperstown, New York, that honors those who were part of the All-American Girls Professional Baseball League. Marie Menheer-Zoromsky, along with the rest of the girls and the league staff, is included at the display/exhibit.
