= Geraldine Bureker =

American baseball player

- Outfield
- Born: December 18, 1924; Portland, Oregon, U.S.
- Died: January 29, 2009 (aged 84)
- Batted: Right Threw: Right

Teams
- Racine Belles (1948)

Career highlights and awards
- Women in Baseball – AAGPBL Permanent Display at Baseball Hall of Fame and Museum (1988)

Geraldine Lee Bureker [Stopper] (December 18, 1924 – January 29, 2009) was an outfielder who played in the All-American Girls Professional Baseball League (AAGPBL). Listed at 5' 2", 125 lb., she batted and threw right handed.

Born in Portland, Oregon, the diminutive Geraldine Bureker played for the Tonseth Flowers team that clinched the Oregon State Championship in 1945. She later saw action in the Chicago softball circuits before joining the AAGPBL with the Racine Belles in the 1948 season.

Bureker batted a .140 average in 28 games for the Belles and posted a perfect 1.000 percentage in nine fielding chances.

In November 1988, Bureker, along with her former teammates and opponents, received their long overdue recognition, when the Baseball Hall of Fame and Museum dedicated a permanent display to the All American Girls Professional Baseball League in Cooperstown, New York.

== Career statistics ==
Batting

GP	AB	R	H	2B	3B	HR	RBI	SB	TB	BB	SO	BA	OBP	SLG
28	53	5	8	0	0	0	2	2	8	9	9	.140	.279	.140

Fielding

GP	PO	A	E	TC	DP	FA
22	8	1	0	9	1	1.000
