= Irene Hickson =

- Born: August 14, 1915; Chattanooga, Tennessee, U.S.
- Died: November 24, 1995 (aged 80); Racine, Wisconsin, U.S.
- Batted: right Threw: right

debut
- 1943

Last appearance
- 1951

Teams
- Racine Belles (1943–1950); Kenosha Comets (1951)

Career highlights and awards
- All-Star Team (1943); Two championship teams (1943, 1946); Four playoff appearances (1943, 1946–1948); Championship batting title (1943); Most walks received in a single game (five, 1946)

Irene Hickson (August 14, 1915 – November 24, 1995) was an American catcher who played from 1943 through 1951 in the All-American Girls Professional Baseball League (AAGPBL). Listed at 5 ft 2 in (1.57 m), 116 lb., she batted and threw right-handed.

At age 27, Irene Hickson became one of the oldest players signed by the All-American Girls Professional Baseball League for its inaugural season. Although averaging .171 lifetime, she was known as an opportune hitter with runners in scoring position during the late innings. Most importantly, Hickson was a solid fielding catcher with a strong throwing arm, and had a reputation as a good handler of pitchers. On the playing field, she collected 2,388 putouts and 561 assists in 621 games, committing only 130 errors in 3,079 chances for a .958 career fielding average. A member of two champion teams, she won the batting title in the 1943 championship series and in 1946 set an all-time record with five walks received in a single game.

== Early life ==
Hickson was born and raised in Chattanooga, Tennessee. An all-around athlete, in the mid 1930s she pitched and caught for semi-professional softball teams in Georgia, Tennessee and North Carolina. She was credited with hitting 25 home runs in 1939 and also formed part of several State Championship teams.

Besides this, in 1938 Hickson became the only girl boxer to fight in Chattanooga. She also competed and won every field and track event ever held at the Warner Park Zoo, including 50-yard dash, relay race, throwing, long jump. and horseshoes. Being a woman and coming from a low-income family, she found a part-time job as a spinning doffer at a yarn processing company. But her ambition was to play ball as long and as well as her idol Ty Cobb and be a catcher like Mickey Owen of the Brooklyn Dodgers.

Hickson later played for a men's team in Chattanooga, where baseball scout Jimmy Hamilton was impressed with her talent.

== AAGPBL career ==
In 1943 Hamilton invited Hickson to an All-American Girls Professional Baseball League tryout. After making the league at tryouts held in Wrigley Field that May, Hickson was allocated to the Racine Belles, a team managed by Johnny Gottselig. She played for them until Racine lost the franchise after the 1950 season. She was dubbed Choo-choo, a wordplay presumably inspired in the popular song Chattanooga Choo Choo, which include her birthplace, and because of the way she ran the bases, like a small wood-burning steam locomotive. During her eight years in the league, she was considered by her teammates to be a leader and a positive influence in their dugout.

In 1943, Hickson shared catching duties with Dorothy Maguire, while the Belles claimed the first Championship Title in the league's history. This team was characterized by strong pitching, fine defensive play, timely hitting and speed on the bases, enough to win the first half with a 33–10 mark and finish the regular season with an overall record of 55 wins and 38 losses. Mary Nesbitt, a knuckleball lefty and first sacker, posted a 26–13 record and hit .280 in 73 games, while Joanne Winter finished with an 11–11 mark to give Racine a strong one-two pitching staff. Margaret Danhauser, Eleanor Dapkus, Maddy English, Sophie Kurys, Edythe Perlick and Claire Schillace, carried the offensive load and provided a solid defense. In the best-of-five Series, Racine defeated the Kenosha Comets, winners of the second half, 3 games to 0, to clinch the AAGPBL title. Hickson excelled behind the plate in the Series and topped all hitters with a .417 average (5-for-12).

Early in the season, Nesbitt and Hickson were referred to as the Belles Chattanooga Battery, because both were discovered by scout Hamilton in there. On July 1 of that year took effect the first All-Star Game of the league, which coincidentally became the first night game ever played at Wrigley Field. The contest was played under temporary lights between two teams composed of Belles and Comets players against South Bend Blue Sox and Rockford Peaches players.

After that, the Belles missed the playoffs for the next two years. Then, managed by Leo Murphy the team returned to post season action from 1946 through 1949. With original roster mostly intact in these seasons, the Belles clinched the title in 1946. Racine won first place with a league-best 74–38 record and won the championship over 1945 champion Rockford, four games to two. Racine's Winter collected four wins in all series, including three against Rockford, despite allowing 19 base runners in a 14-inning, 1–0 shutout victory in decisive Game Six. The only run in the marathonic game came in the bottom of the 14th, when Kurys hit a single off Mildred Deegan, then stole second base, and scored on an RBI-single by Betty Trezza. Unfortunately for Deegan, she was the pitching star of the over-all series, beating Grand Rapids and Racine twice each and winning four straight before the Belles finally stopped her in the final game.

The Belles moved from Racine, Wisconsin to Battle Creek, Michigan before the 1951 season. As a result, Hickson, Kurys, Dapkus, English, Perlick and Winter were emotionally disappointed and rejected the move. During eight years, the Belles were a close-knit team, always like a family away from home. The girls thought that all would be different, like a new team, maybe a new manager and, specially, a new location. A longtime resident of Racine, Hickson decided to stay close to home and played one more season with Kenosha.

== Life after baseball ==
Following her baseball career, Hickson ran a restaurant called Home Plate. Then she worked during 22 years for the Zayre department store chain.

Irene Hickson is part of Women in Baseball, a permanent display based at the Baseball Hall of Fame and Museum in Cooperstown, New York. The exhibition was unveiled on November 5, 1988, in honor of the entire All-American Girls Professional Baseball League rather than individual baseball personalities. After that, filmmaker Penny Marshall premiered her 1992 film A League of Their Own, a fictional history centered in the first season of the AAGPBL, which brought a rejuvenated interest to the historic girls league.

Hickson died of natural causes at her home in Racine at the age of 80.

== Career statistics ==
Batting

GP	AB	R	H	2B	3B	HR	RBI	SB	BB	SO	BA	OBP
621	1876	296	321	23	14	3	125	319	316	173	.171	.291

Fielding

GP	PO	A	E	TC	DP	FA
602	2388	561	130	3079	47	.958
