= Jack Harris (American football) =

American football player (1902–1973)

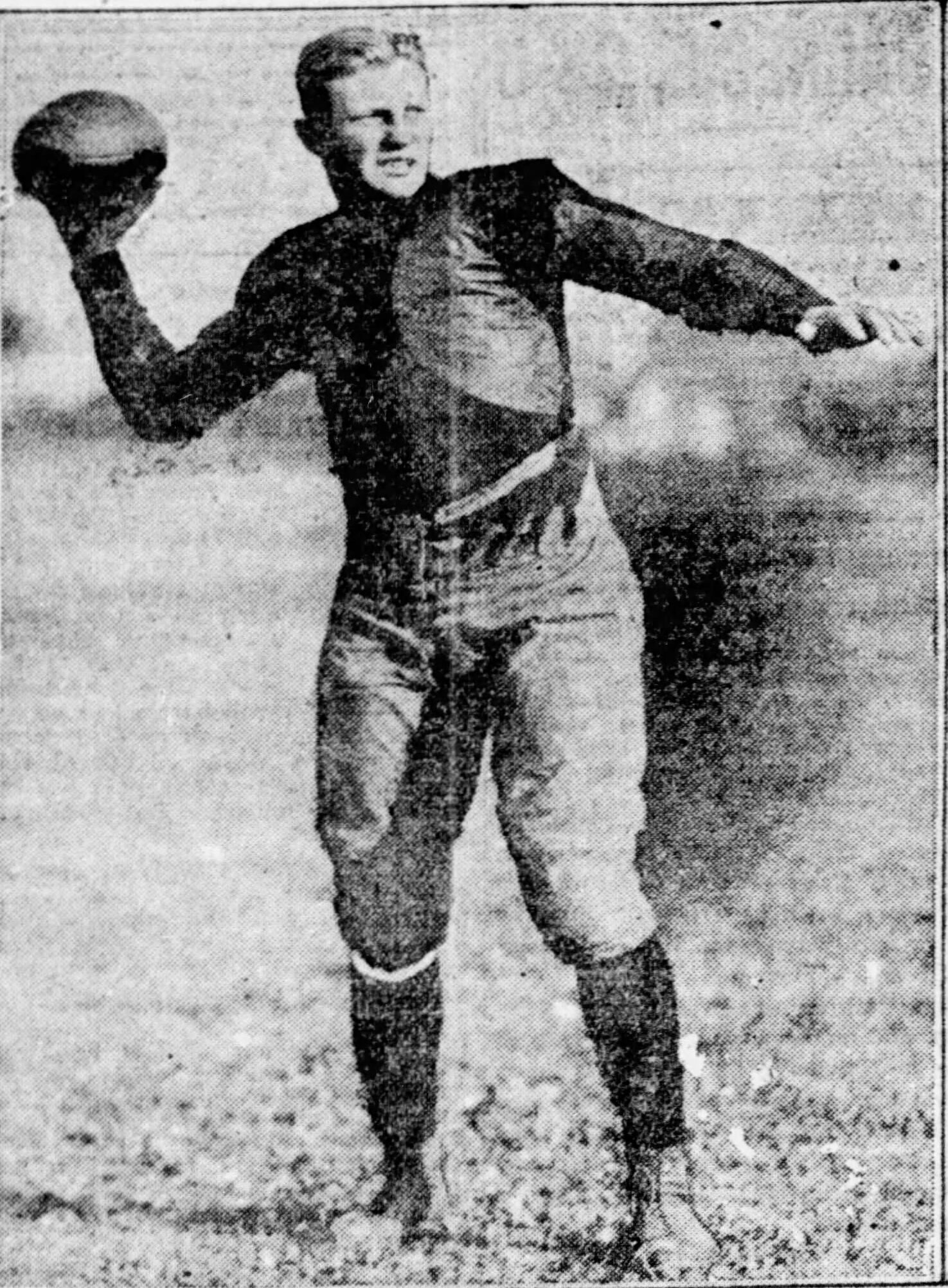

Profile
- Position: Fullback

Personal information
- Born: September 29, 1902; Jackson, Michigan, US
- Died: December 28, 1973 (aged 71); Indianapolis, Indiana, US
- Listed height: 5 ft 11 in (1.80 m)
- Listed weight: 190 lb (86 kg)

Career information
- High school: Racine (WI)
- College: Wisconsin

Career history
- Green Bay Packers (1925–1926)

Career statistics
- Games played: 21
- Games started: 12
- Rushing TDs: 3
- Stats at Pro Football Reference

Welton John "Jack" Harris (September 29, 1902 – December 28, 1973) was a player in the National Football League.

Harris was born on September 29, 1902, in Jackson, Michigan. He attended high school in Racine, Wisconsin and played at the collegiate level at the University of Wisconsin.

Harris played with the Green Bay Packers for two seasons. He was captain of the 1924 Wisconsin team. In his final game for Wisconsin, against Chicago, he gained more yards rushing, 193, than the whole Chicago team.
