= Norm Derringer =

American softball player and manager

- Manager
- Born: February 4, 1914; Racine, Wisconsin, U.S.
- Died: October 5, 1997 (aged 83)
- Batted: N/A Threw: N/A

Teams
- Racine Belles (1950)

Norman "Nummy" W. Dieringer, surname more commonly spelled Derringer (February 4, 1914 – October 5, 1997), was an American softball player and a baseball manager.

== Career ==
Born in Racine, Wisconsin, Derringer played on ten state championship softball teams from 1934 through 1946. A seven-time All-Star shortstop between 1934 and 1942, he was named Most Valuable Player in the 1934 ASA National Tournament while playing for the Ke-Nash-A's team.

As a member of Racine, Derringer helped his team to clinch the 1948 championship title of the National Fast Pitch League. He also was chosen All-Star shortstop of the league in 1948 and 1949.

Derringer joined the All-American Girls Professional Baseball League in 1950, scouting for the league and managing the Racine Belles in their final year of existence.

== Legacy ==
In 1986, Derringer was inducted in the Wisconsin ASA Hall of Fame. He is also part of Women in Baseball, a permanent display at the Baseball Hall of Fame and Museum at Cooperstown, New York. This exhibition was unveiled in 1988 to honor the entire AAGPBL rather than individual baseball personalities.

== See also ==
- USA Softball
