= Gene Rose (American football back) =

American football player (1904–1979)

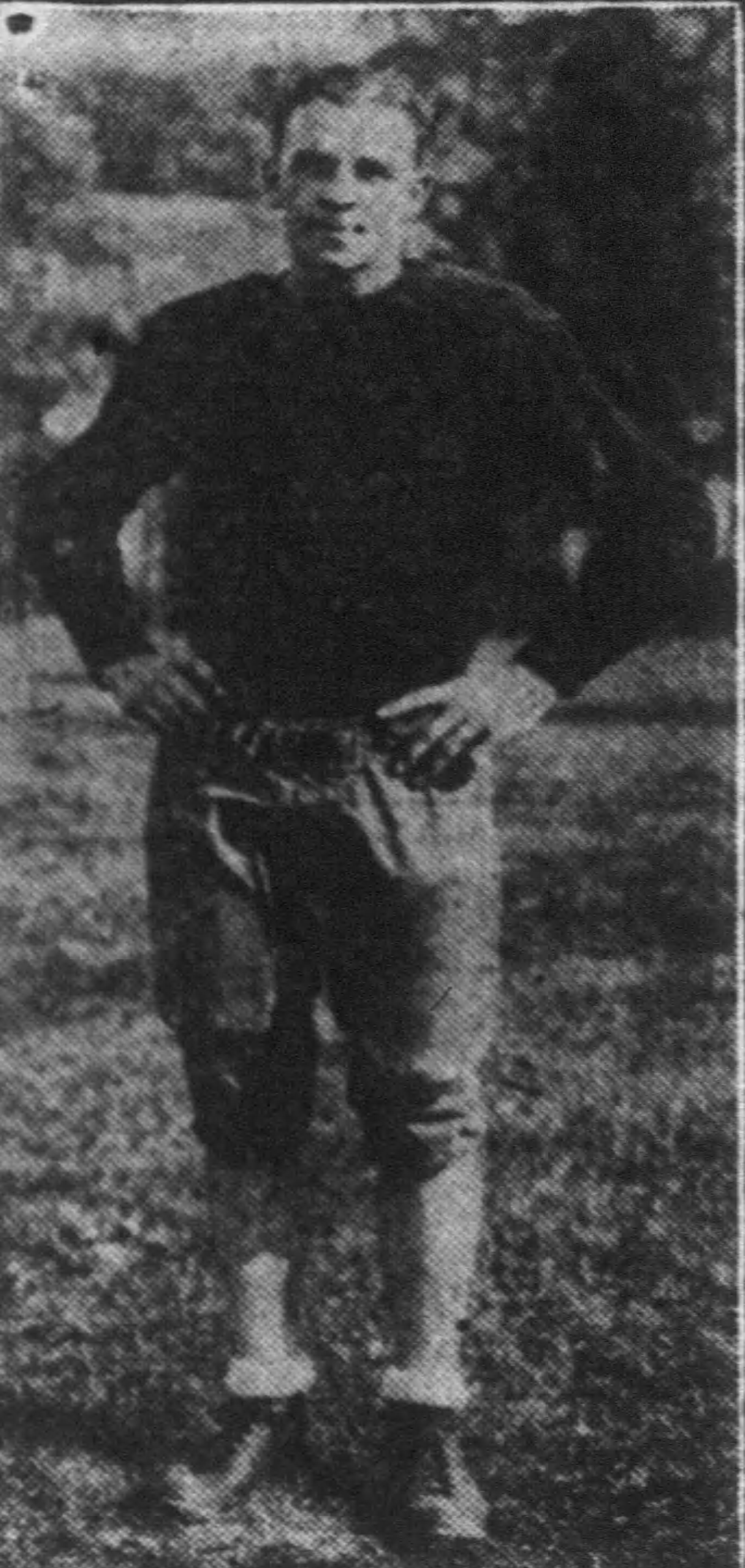

No. 22, 37
- Positions: Halfback, quarterback

Personal information
- Born: July 11, 1904; Racine, Wisconsin, U.S.
- Died: February 1, 1979 (aged 74); Torrance, California, U.S.
- Listed height: 5 ft 8 in (1.73 m)
- Listed weight: 172 lb (78 kg)

Career information
- High school: Racine (WI)
- College: Wisconsin

Career history
- Chicago Cardinals (1929–1932)

Career statistics
- Games played: 34
- Points scored: 37
- Stats at Pro Football Reference

Eugene Harry Rose (July 11, 1904 – February 1, 1979) was an American football halfback and quarterback. He played college football for the Wisconsin Badgers (1925–1928) and professional football in the National Football League (NFL) for the Chicago Cardinals from 1929 to 1932.

Rose was born in 1904 at Racine, Wisconsin, and attended Racine High School. He enrolled at the University of Wisconsin in 1925 and played for the Wisconsin Badgers football team from 1925 to 1928. He developed a reputation in 1926 as both a passer and open field runner.

Rose also played professional football for the Chicago Cardinals from 1929 to 1932. He appeared in 34 games (18 as a starter) and scored 37 points on six touchdowns and one extra point. His playing career was plagued by problems with the law, including a 1931 charge of stealing an automobile, a 1930 charge of aiding in the theft of fur coats from a furrier, and an assault and battery charge while playing for Wisconsin.
