= Dorothy Damaschke =

American baseball and badminton player

- Outfielder
- Born: August 26, 1917; Racine, Wisconsin, U.S.
- Died: January 7, 2000 (aged 82); Racine, Wisconsin, U.S.
- Batted: Right Threw: Right

Teams
- Racine Belles (1945)

Career highlights and awards
- Women in Baseball – AAGPBL Permanent Display at Baseball Hall of Fame and Museum (since 1988)

Dorothy Damaschke (August 26, 1917 – January 7, 2000) was an American outfielder who played in the All-American Girls Professional Baseball League (AAGPBL). Listed at 5' 3", 135 lb., she batted and threw right handed.

Born in Racine, Wisconsin, Damaschke was a prominent softball pitcher during eight years before her marriage in 1938.

Filling in during her college years, Damaschke broke into the league at age 27 with her hometown Racine Belles in its 1945 season. She went hitless in two at bats during her only game in the league.

After baseball, Damaschke developed as a badminton player and claimed a champion title in Racine.

The All-American Girls Professional Baseball League folded in 1954, but there is a permanent display at the Baseball Hall of Fame and Museum at Cooperstown, New York, since November 5, 1988, that honors the entire league rather than any individual figure.
