= Harriet Persis Hurlbut =

American painter

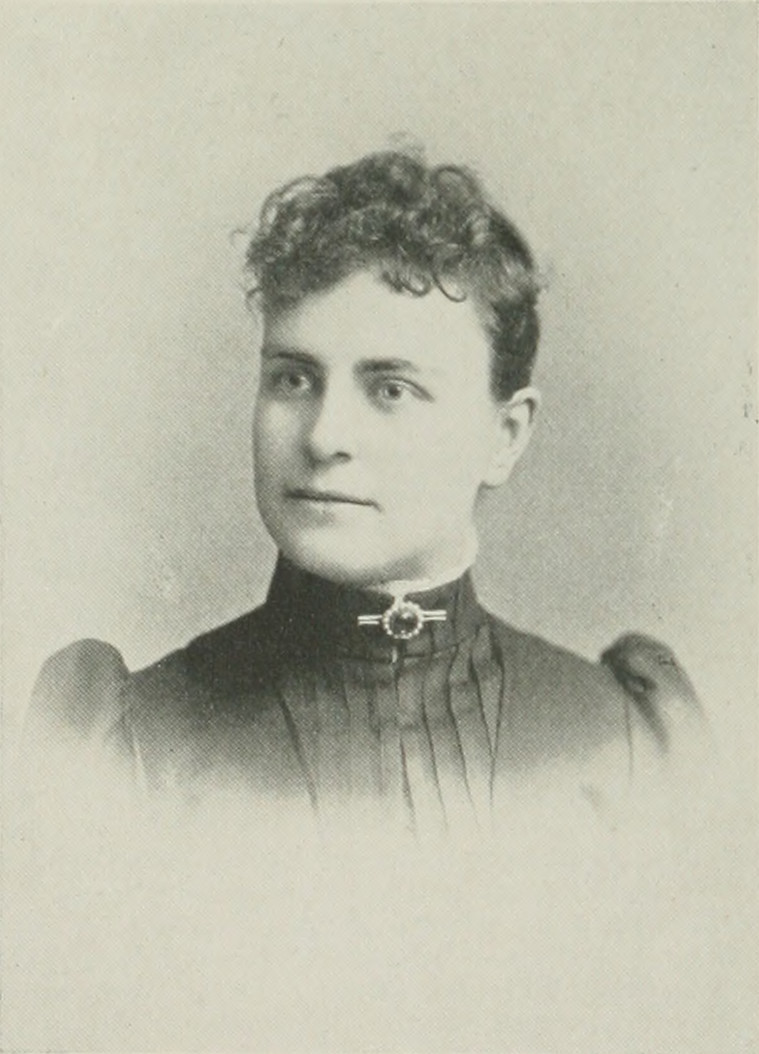
Harriet Persis Hurlbut, "A woman of the century"

Hurlbut's signature

Harriet Persis Hurlbut (February 26, 1862 – March 20, 1932) was an American artist. Like her father, she was fond of historical and genealogical matters. One of her paintings hangs in the rooms of the Chicago Historical Society, being a portrait of the early explorer Samuel de Champlain.

== Early years and education ==
Harriet Persis Hurlbut was born in Racine, Wisconsin, February 26, 1862. She was the youngest child and only daughter of Henry Higgins Hurlbut, the author of several works, among them Chicago Antiquities and Hurlbut Genealogy. Through her mother, Harriet Elizabeth Sykes Hurlbut, she traced her ancestry back to four of the Mayflower pilgrims, among them Priscilla Mullins and her husband, John Alden. The line of descent through their daughter, Ruth, included the names of Deacon Samuel Bass, his daughter, Mary Bass Bowditch, Abigail Bowditch, Jeremiah Pratt, and Harriette Partridge Pratt, who married Dr. Royal S. Sykes, of Dorset, Vermont, and was the grandmother of Miss Hurlbut. She had two brothers, Sidney Sykes Hurlbut and Jonathan Henry Hurlbut (died 1871).

With her family, she moved to Chicago in the winter of 1873, and resided in that city until her death there in 1932. She was graduated from Park Institute, Chicago, it June, 1880. An early fondness for drawing turned her attention to art, and she entered the studio of Professor Peter Baumgras, with whom she pursued her studies in sketching and oil painting almost continuously for eight years.

== Career ==
Her first venture was in connection with Mrs. Mary B. Baumgras. Together, they opened a studio in Chicago. Hurlbut's best known picture was the life-size portrait of Samuel de Champlain, which forms part of the Chicago Historical Society's collection. Always of a serious cast of mind, Hurlbut passed her later years in retirement, with her brother, in the paternal home in Chicago, where she devoted herself to the completion of a family record book, which her father began long before.
