= John L. Sieb =

American politician and barber

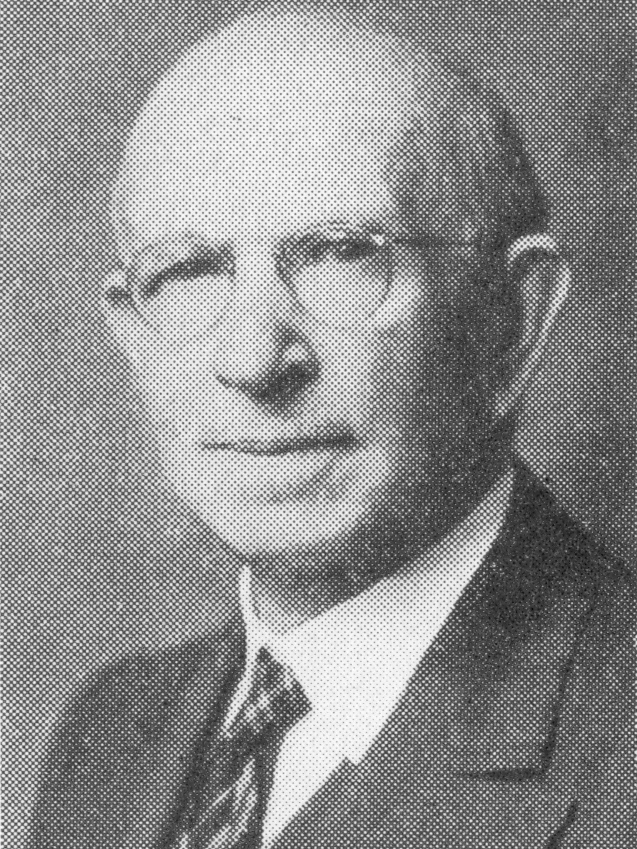
Sieb circa 1940

John L. Sieb (November 6, 1864 – October 24, 1941) was an American politician and barber.

Born in Michigan City, Indiana, Sieb moved to Racine, Wisconsin with his mother after his father died. He went to public and Lutheran schools. Sieb became a barber and open his shop in Racine. He served on the board of education from 1900 to 1902 and was president of the board. Then from 1915 until 1923, Sieb served on the Racine Common Council and was president of the council. Sieb was on the Racine Water Commission and the Racine Board of Health. He was also as Wisconsin Deputy Oil Inspector. Sieb served in the Wisconsin State Assembly during the 1931 session as a Republican and again from 1935 until 1941 as a Progressive. In the 1940 election Thomas P. Corbett defeated Sieb. Later, in 1941, Sieb sold the barber shop and retired. He died in Racine, Wisconsin.
