= Racine Belles =

- 1943–1950; Racine, Wisconsin
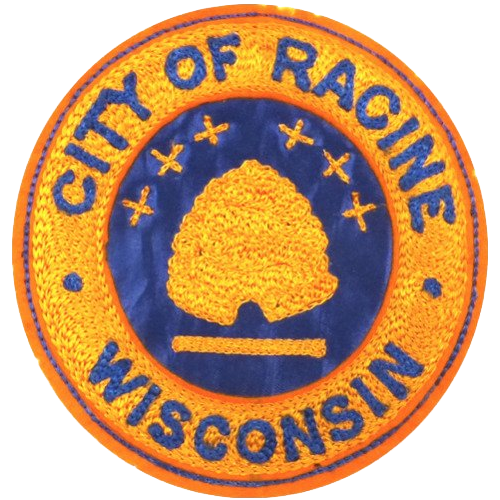
Team logo
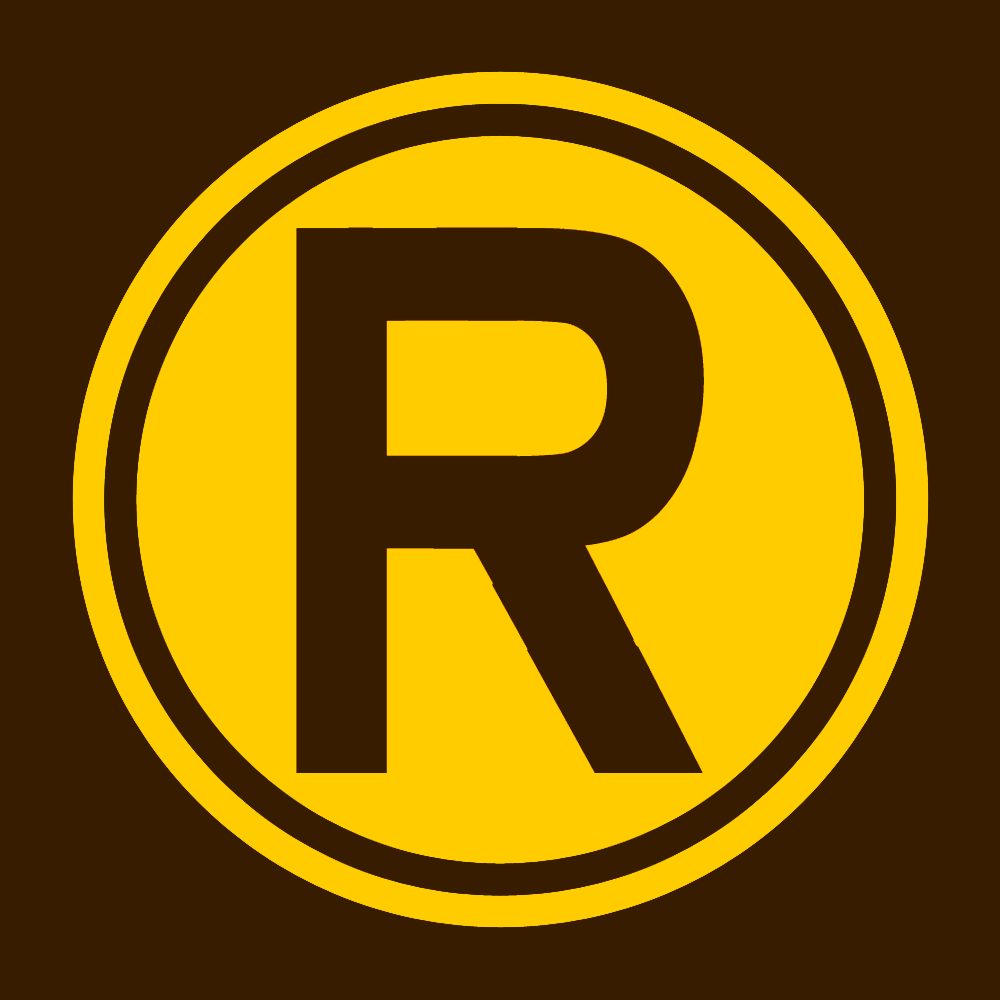
Cap insignia

Minor league affiliations
- Previous leagues: All-American Girls Professional Baseball League

Minor league titles
- League titles: 1943, 1946

Team data
- Colors: Brown, gold
- Previous parks: Horlick Field
- Owner/ Operator: AAGPBL

The Racine Belles were one of the original teams of the All-American Girls Professional Baseball League (AAGPBL) playing from 1943 through 1950 out of Racine, Wisconsin. The Belles won the league's first championship. The team played its home games at Horlick Field.

== History ==
In 1943, the Belles claimed the first Championship Title in the league's history. This team was characterized by strong pitching, solid defense, timely hitting and speed on the bases.

Racine won the first half with a 33–10 mark, and finished the regular season with an overall record of 55 wins and 38 losses. Mary Nesbitt led the pitching staff with a 26–13 record for a .667 winning percentage (fifth-best of the league), including 308 innings of work in 47 appearances. She also hit .280, scored 34 runs, and drove in 29 more in 73 games. At a time of the season, Nesbitt put together an 11-game winning streak. Besides Nesbitt, the Belles also counted on the talents of Joanne Winter, who posted an 11–11 record, to give the team a strong one-two pitching staff. Slugger right fielder Eleanor Dapkus hit a league-lead 10 home runs, while Sophie Kurys stole a league-best 44 bases and scored 60 runs. Margaret Danhauser, Maddy English, Edythe Perlick and Claire Schillace could be counted on for their bats and solid defense.

The first AAGPBL Championship Series pitted first-half winner Racine against the Kenosha Comets, second-half champ. In the best-of-five series, Racine swept Kenosha to clinch the championship. Nesbitt claimed complete-game victories in Games 1 and 3, and saved Game 2 after Winter ran into trouble in the eighth inning. Irene Hickson, who shared the catching duties with Dorothy Maguire, led all-hitters with a .417 average and five RBI in the three games.

In 1946, Anna Mae Hutchison posted a 26–14 record with 102 strikeouts in 51 games, setting an all-time, single-season record for games pitched, and also hurled the first nine-inning no-hitter in Belles history, a 1–0 victory over the Kenosha Comets. Winter finished with a 33–9 record, including 17 shutouts and 183 strikeouts in 46 pitching appearances. The Belles claimed first place with a league-best 74–38 record, and won the semifinal round of playoffs by defeating the South Bend Blue Sox in four games. In Game 1, English drove in the winning run by hitting a double in the bottom half of the 14th inning. Then, in decisive Game 5 she knocked the winning run with a single in the bottom half of the 17th inning. In this first round series she went 11-for-31 for a .353 average, including her two game-winning RBI. After that, the Belles beat the 1945 champions, the Rockford Peaches, four games to two in the final best-of-seven series to clinch the Championship Title. Throughout the playoffs, Kurys led all players in average, stolen bases and runs. On the other hand, Winter collected four wins in the playoffs, including a 14-inning, 1–0 shutout victory over the Peaches in decisive Game Six. The winning run was scored by Kurys on an RBI-single by Betty Trezza, while Danhauser handled 22 chances flawlessly. During the regular season, the Belles again showed a great defense, notably by infielders Danhauser (1B), Kurys (2B) and English (3B), while Perlick (LF), Schillace (CF) and Dapkus (RF) patrolled the outfield. And moreover, fielding ability and speed on the bases were immensely more crucial and challenging in a dominant pitching league.

Racine's biggest newspaper, The Racine Journal Times, covered every Belles game, which contributed to community interest in the team. Many local businesses closed during games to encourage their workers and customers to attend.

After eight successful seasons the Belles lacked the financial resources to keep the club playing in Racine and decided to move to Battle Creek, Michigan, at the end of the 1950 season. Some founding team members, including Danhauser, Dapkus, English, Kurys, Perlick, Schillace and Winter, were disappointed with the new location and would not make the move. During eight years, the Belles were a close-knit team, always like a family away from home. They thought that all would be different, like a new team, maybe a new manager and, especially, a new location.

After moving, the team was renamed the Battle Creek Belles and played from 1951 to 1952. For their final season, they moved to Muskegon, Michigan, and played as the Muskegon Belles.

== Season-by-season records ==
| Year | Manager | W | L | W-L% | End | GB | Details |
|---|---|---|---|---|---|---|---|
| 1943 | Johnny Gottselig | 34; 25 | 20; 23 | .630.521 | 1st 3rd | – 13.0 | First half Second half Playoff champion |
| 1944 | Johnny Gottselig | 28; 26 | 32; 31 | .467.456 | 4th 4th | 6 1/2; 13.0 | First half Second half |
| 1945 | Charley Stis; Leo Murphy | 50 | 60 | .455 | 4th | 17.0 | |
| 1946 | Leo Murphy | 74 | 38 | .661 | 1st | – | League and Playoff champion |
| 1947 | Leo Murphy | 65 | 47 | .580 | 3rd | 4.0 | |
| 1948 | Leo Murphy | 76 | 49 | .608 | 1st | – | Western Division Champion |
| 1949 | Leo Murphy | 45 | 65 | .409 | 7th | 29 1/2 | |
| 1950 | Norm Derringer | 50 | 60 | .455 | 6th | 15 1/2 | |

== All-time players roster ==
Bold denotes members of the inaugural roster

- Beatrice Arbour
- Doris Barr
- Annastasia Batikis
- Barbara Berger
- Erma Bergmann
- Rita Briggs
- **Leola Brody**
- Geraldine Bureker
- Clara Chiano
- Gloria Cordes
- **Rita Corrigan**
- Dorothy Damaschke
- **Margaret Danhauser**
- Shirley Danz
- **Eleanor Dapkus**
- Barbara Anne Davis
- Irene DeLaby
- Julie Dusanko
- Elizabeth Emry
- **Madeline English**
- Louise Erickson
- Fern Ferguson
- Josephine Figlo
- Mary Flaherty
- Edna Frank
- Philomena Gianfrancisco
- Beverly Hatzell
- Ruby Heafner
- **Irene Hickson**
- Joyce Hill
- Marjorie Hood
- **Dorothy Hunter**
- Anna Mae Hutchison
- Jane Jacobs
- Janet Jacobs
- Marie Kazmierczak
- Mary Ellen Kimball
- **Ruby Knezovich**
- Phyllis Koehn
- Irene Kotowicz
- Ruth Kramer
- **Sophie Kurys**
- Laurie Ann Lee
- Sarah Lonetto
- Shirley Luhtala
- **Dorothy Maguire**
- **Gloria Marks**
- Mildred Meacham
- Naomi Meier
- Marie Menheer
- Norma Metrolis
- Dorothy Montgomery
- **Glenora Moss**
- **Mary Nesbitt**
- Marjorie Nossek
- Anna Mae O'Dowd
- Dorothy Ortman
- Lavonne Paire
- Shirley Palesh
- Marguerite Pearson
- June Peppas
- **Edythe Perlick**
- Marjorie Pieper
- Grace Piskula
- Jenny Romatowski
- Betty Russell
- **Claire Schillace**
- Doris Shero
- **Charlotte Smith**
- Ruby Stephens
- Dorothy Stolze
- Lucille Stone
- Beverly Stuhr
- Virginia Tezak
- **Annebelle Thompson**
- Betty Trezza
- Georgette Vincent
- Frances Vukovich
- **Martha Walker**
- Thelma Walmsley
- Rossey Weeks
- Margaret Wenzell
- **Dorothy Wind**
- **Joanne Winter**
- Agnes Zurowski

== Chaperones ==
- Virginia Carrigy
- Irene Hickson
- Mildred Wilson

== Notable achievements ==
- In 1945 the team won the attendance trophy for having the largest audience on opening night, May 23, with 4,019 fans.
- The Belles were the first team in the AAGPBL to sponsor a junior team. The Junior Belles were local high school girls who played on four teams, the Golds, the Greens, the Reds, and the Grays. Their coaches, uniforms, and equipment were provided by Western Publishing, the sponsor for the professional Belles.
- Although the 1992 film A League of Their Own features the Racine Belles, all of the characters playing on the team were fictional, and ballpark scenes were filmed in Evansville, Indiana. Nonetheless, the Belles did win the league championship in 1943, but over the Kenosha Comets, not the Rockford Peaches as the movie depicts.

== Fastpitch ==
Previously, a minor league team also named Racine Belles played in the Wisconsin–Illinois League from 1909 through 1913, and then in the Bi-State League in 1915. It was a Class D team in 1909 and 1915, and a Class C team from 1910 to 1913.

The name Racine Belles now refers to a non-profit organization dedicated to the development of girls' fastpitch softball in southeastern Wisconsin.

== Sources ==
- Berlage, Gai Ingham. Charley Gerard. Women in Baseball: The Forgotten History. Greenwood Publishing Group, 1994. ISBN 0-275-94735-1
- Brown, Patricia I. A League of My Own: Memoir of a Pitcher for the All-American Girls. Macfarland & Company, 2003. ISBN 978-0-7864-1474-1
- Heaphy, Leslie A.; Mel Anthony May. Encyclopedia of Women and Baseball. McFarland & Company, 2006. ISBN 0-7864-2100-2
- Johnson, Susan. When Women Played Hardball. Seal Press, 1994. ISBN 1-878067-43-5
- Karls, Alan R. Racine's Horlick Athletic Field: Drums Along the Foundries. The History Press, 2014. ISBN 978-1-62619-444-1
- Macy, Sue. A Whole New Ball Game: The Story of the All-American Girls Professional Baseball League. Puffin, 1995. ISBN 0-14-037423-X
- Madden, W. C. All-American Girls Professional Baseball League Record Book. McFarland & Company, 2000. ISBN 0-7864-3747-2
- Madden, W. C. The Women of the All-American Girls Professional Baseball League: A Biographical Dictionary. McFarland & Company, 2005. ISBN 0-7864-3747-2
- Porter, David L. Biographical Dictionary of American Sports. Greenwood Press, 2000. ISBN 978-0-313-29884-4
