= Margaret Danhauser =

- First base
- Born: June 9, 1921; Racine, Wisconsin, U.S.
- Died: January 6, 1987 (aged 65); Racine, Wisconsin, U.S.
- Batted: Right Threw: Right

Teams
- Racine Belles (1943–1950)

Career highlights and awards
- Two Playoff Championships (1943, 1946); Four playoff appearances (1943, 1946-'48)

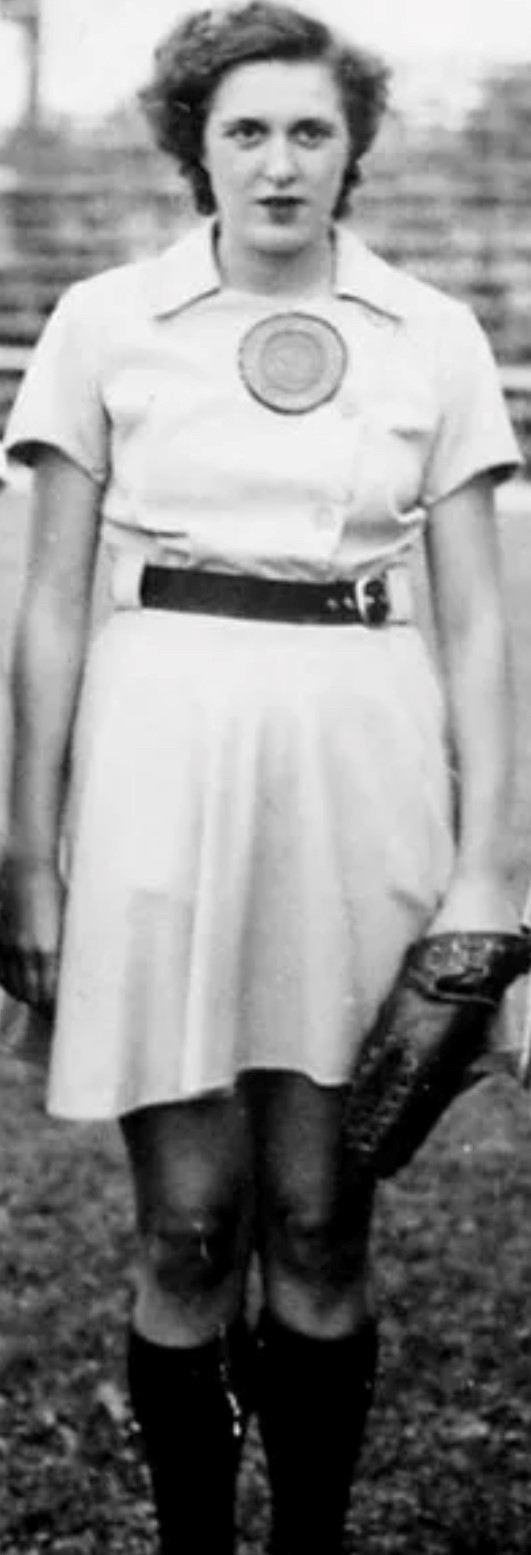
Marnie Danhauser

Margaret L. "Marnie" Danhauser (June 9, 1921 – January 6, 1987) was an American first basewoman who played from 1943 through 1948 in the All-American Girls Professional Baseball League (AAGPBL). She batted and threw right-handed.

== Career ==
A native of Racine, Wisconsin, Danhauser became the first hometown girl to join the All-American Girls Professional Baseball League. Basically a line-drive hitter, she was an accomplished defender at first base during eight seasons and a member of two Championship teams.

The All-American Girls Professional Baseball League was a circuit that began to operate in 1943 in cities located on or near Lake Michigan. The main promoter was Philip K. Wrigley, owner of the Chicago Cubs, who worried about the viability of Major League Baseball players during World War II decided to establish an alternate attraction. The All-American Girls Professional Baseball League was a circuit that began to operate in 1943 in cities located on or near Lake Michigan. Play in 1943 was a weird hybrid of softball and baseball, and the circuit was initially called the All-American Girls Softball League, though early in the first season the name was changed to All American Girls Baseball League. The new league started with four teams, the Kenosha Comets, Racine Belles, Rockford Peaches and South Bend Blue Sox. Danhauser was invited to a tryout at Wrigley Field in Chicago, and immediately was assigned to the Belles.

In addition to baseball and softball, Danhauser had played basketball, bowling and golf as a youth near Racine. She attended St. Joseph School and St. Catherine's High School, and played with the local Pugh Coal girls softball team for three years, winning the Wisconsin State Championship in 1936 and 1937. She also worked for Western Printing and Lithographing as a book binder before joining the AAGPBL in its inaugural season.

In 1943 the Belles won both the first half of the season and AAGPBL championship. In the best-of-five Series, Racine defeated the Kenosha Comets, winners of the second half, 3 games to 0. The attack was led by slugging right fielder Eleanor Dapkus, who hit a league-lead 10 home runs, while Sophie Kurys, well known for her stunning speed, stole 44 bases and scored 60 runs. The pitching staff was led by Mary Nesbitt (26–11) and Joanne Winter (11–11), while Danhauser, Maddy English, Edythe Perlick and Claire Schillace could be counted on for their bats and solid defense.

In 1946, Winter earned 33 victories for only nine losses while pitching 17 shutouts with 183 strikeouts in 46 appearances. The Belles finished first place with a league-best 74–38 record, won the semifinal round of playoffs by defeating the South Bend Blue Sox in four games, and clinched the AAGPBL crown by defeating the 1945 champions, the Rockford Peaches, four games to two. Throughout the playoffs, Kurys led all players in average, stolen bases and runs. On the other hand, Winter collected four wins in the playoffs, including a 14-inning, 1–0 shutout victory over the Peaches in decisive Game Six. The winning run was scored by Kurys on an RBI-single by Betty Trezza, while Danhauser handled 22 chances flawlessly. During the season, the Belles again showed a great defense, notably by Danhauser at first, Kurys at second, English at third and Trezza at shortstop, while Irene Hickson caught and Perlick (LF), Schillace (CF) and Dapkus (RF) patrolled the outfield. And moreover, fielding ability and speed on the bases were immensely more crucial and challenging in a dominant pitching league.

In 1947 Racine defeated the Muskegon Lassies in the playoffs, three games to one, but lost to the Grand Rapids Chicks in the final Series four games to three. In the 1948 season the team lost the semifinal playoff to the Rockford Peaches, the eventually Championship Team.

But after eight successful seasons the Belles lacked the financial resources to keep the club playing in Racine and decided to move to Battle Creek, Michigan for the 1951 season. Then Danhauser, along with Dapkus, English, Hickson, Kurys, Perlick, Schillace and Winter, founding team members, were disappointment with the new location and would not make the move. During eight years, the eight girls were a close-knit unit, always like a family away from home, as they thought that all would be different.

Danhauser was a .144 hitter in 728 games. At first base, she committed only 179 errors in 7794 chances for an outstanding .982 fielding average.

Following her playing retirement, Danhauser returned to her home town of Racine and married, changing her name to Margaret Danhauser Brown. She died at the age of 65.

== Statistics ==
=== Batting ===
GP	AB	R	H	2B	3B	HR	RBI	SB	BB	SO	BA
728	2257	167	325	16	10	3	176	94	166	189	.144

=== Fielding ===
PO	A	E	TC	DP	FA
7409	243	142	7794	179	.982

== Sources ==
- A League Of My Own: Memoir of a Pitcher for the All-American Girls – Patricia I. Brown. Publisher: Macfarland & Company, 2003. Format: Paperback, 216pp. Language: English. ISBN 978-0-7864-1474-1
- Biographical Dictionary of American Sports – David L. Porter. Publisher: Greenwood Press, 2000. Format: Hardcover, 2064pp. Language: English. ISBN 978-0-313-29884-4
- Dirt on Their Skirts: The Story of the Young Women who Won the World Championship – Doreen Rappaport, Lyndall Callan, E. B. Lewis. Publisher: Penguin Group, 2000. Format: Hardcover, 32pp. Language: English. ISBN 978-0-8037-2042-8 *Encyclopedia of Women and Baseball' – Leslie A. Heaphy, Mel Anthony May. Publisher: McFarland & Company, 2006. Format: Paperback, 438pp. Language: English. ISBN 0-7864-2100-2
- Women in Baseball: The Forgotten History – Gai Ingham Berlage, Charley Gerard. Publisher: Greenwood Publishing Group, 1994. Format: Hardcover, 224pp. Language: English. ISBN 0-275-94735-1
- The Women of the All-American Girls Professional Baseball League: A Biographical Dictionary – W. C. Madden. Publisher: McFarland & Company, 2005. Format: Paperback, 295 pp. Language: English. ISBN 0-7864-3747-2
- When Women Played Hardball – Susan Johnson. Publisher: Seal Press, 1994. Format: Paperback, 320pp. Language: Language: English. ISBN 1-878067-43-5
- All-American Girls Professional Baseball League History. Retrieved 2019-03-29.
- Baseball Historian
