= Laurie Ann Lee =

American baseball player

- Pitcher
- Born: January 3, 1931 (age 94); Racine, Wisconsin, U.S.
- Bats: Right Throws: Right

Teams
- Racine Belles (1948)

Career highlights and awards
- Women in Baseball – AAGPBL Permanent Display at the Baseball Hall of Fame and Museum (unveiled in 1988)

Laurie Ann Lee (born January 3, 1931) is a former pitcher who played in the All-American Girls Professional Baseball League (AAGPBL). Listed at 5' 7", 130 lb., she batted and threw right handed.

Born in Racine, Wisconsin, Laurie Ann Lee only played during one season in the All American League for her home team in 1949.

When Lee was 19, she received an invitation to the league's spring training camp in Racine. Eventually she materialized her dream and was assigned to the Racine Belles before the 1948 season. However, she suffered a broken finger while training and did not pitch much after that.

Afterwards, Lee was called into active military service during the Korean War conflict and served for twelve years. She later managed an electronic manufacturing company for 30 years, and then owned and operated a manufacturing business in the swimming pool industry.

The All American League folded in 1954, but there is a permanent display at the Baseball Hall of Fame and Museum at Cooperstown, New York, since 1988 that honors the entire league rather than any individual figure.
