= Al Zupek =

American football player (1922–1980)

Profile
- Position: Fullback

Personal information
- Born: January 12, 1922; Racine, Wisconsin
- Died: June 16, 1980 (aged 61)
- Listed height: 6 ft 1 in (1.85 m)
- Listed weight: 205 lb (93 kg)

Career information
- High school: Racine (WI)
- College: Lawrence

Career history
- Green Bay Packers (1946)

Career statistics
- Rushing att-yards: 0
- Receptions-yards: 0
- Touchdowns: 0

Albert Ernest Zupek (January 12, 1922 – June 16, 1980) was a fullback in the National Football League who played for the Green Bay Packers. Zupek played collegiate ball for Lawrence College, (now Lawrence University) before playing professionally for one season in 1946. He retired that same season.
