= Modine Manufacturing =

American thermal management company

- Traded as: NYSE: MOD; Russell 2000 Component
- Founded: 1916

Modine Manufacturing is a thermal management company established in 1916 in the United States. The company started as Modine Manufacturing Company by Arthur B Modine who patented the Spirex radiator for tractors. The Modine company manufactured the Turbotube radiator for Ford Model T cars. The company built the world's first vehicular wind tunnel in Racine, Wisconsin in 1941. During WWII, Modine manufactured aftercoolers for the P-51 Mustang fighter plane. After WWII, Modine introduced the Airditioner HVAC unit for both residential and non-residential applications. The company expanded with a European operation, Modine Schnappling Europe, in 1990 and in 1993 acquired Längerer & Reich, a German heat transfer company founded in 1913. Today, the company employs around 11,000 people.

In November 2026, reports suggested Samsung Electronics was in advanced talks to buy the company.

== Structure ==
Modine Manufacturing is the parent of 44 subsidiaries. The most prominent subsidiaries are listed below.

Subsidiary	Business
Modine HVAC	HVAC systems for commercial, industrial, and data center applications
Climate by Design International (CDI)	Desiccant dehumidifiers and critical process air handlers for indoor air quality
L.B. White	Heating and cooling solutions for agriculture, industrial, construction, and greenhouse use
AbsolutAire	Direct-fired make-up air and heating ventilation systems

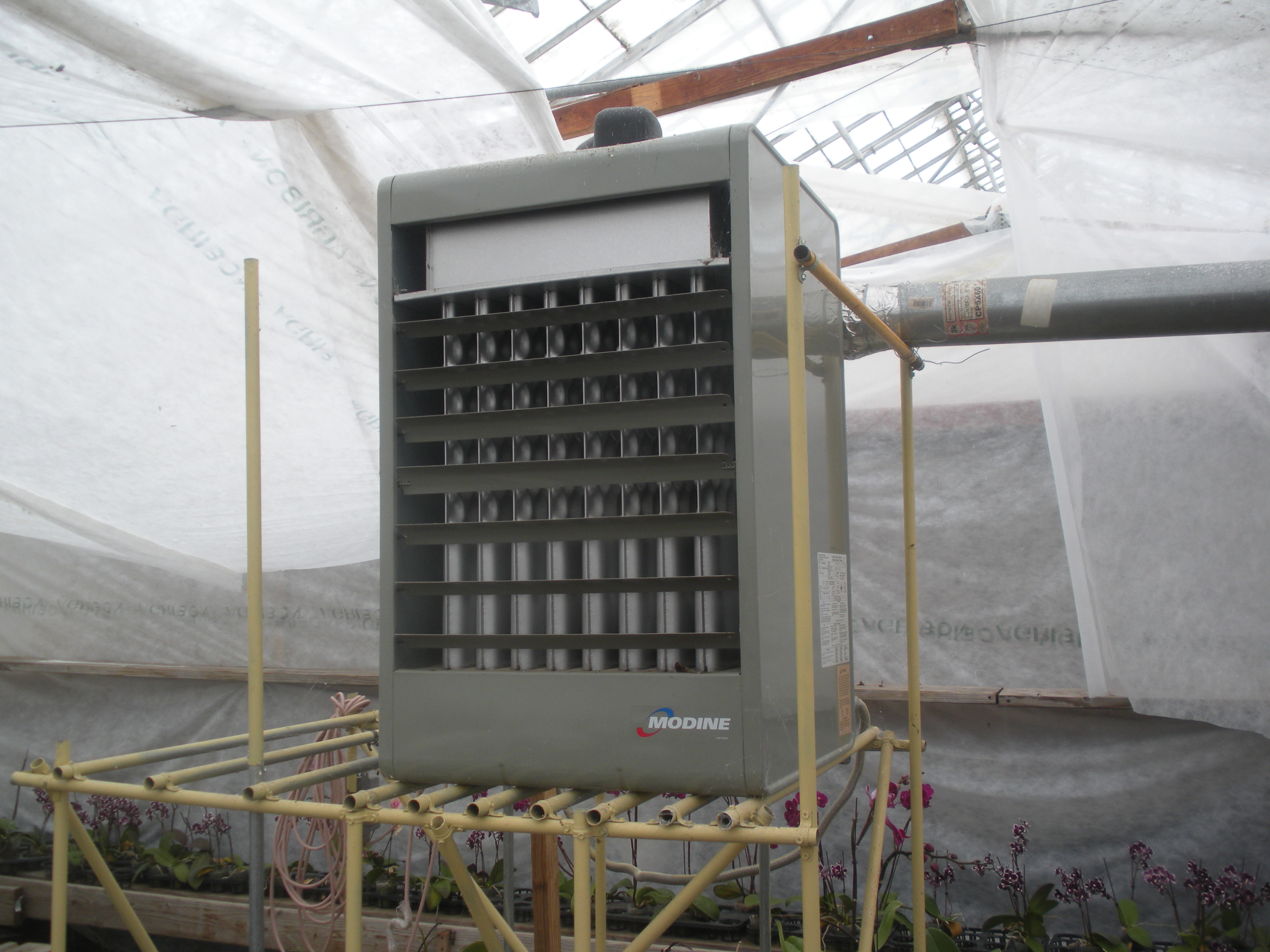
A Modine unit heater at a nursery

== Superfund Site ==
Modine Mfg Co is a superfund site located at 2047 Ireland Grove Rd, Bloomington, IL 61701 by the US Environmental Protection Agency (EPA). This Modine location manufactured tractor radiators and oil coolers and is now closed. Modine Mfg Co is currently registered as an Archived superfund site by the EPA and does not require any clean up action or further investigation at this time.
