= Annastasia Batikis =

American baseball player

- Center fielder
- Born: March 15, 1927; Kaukauna, Wisconsin, U.S.
- Died: March 12, 2016 (aged 88); Racine, Wisconsin, U.S.
- Batted: Left Threw: Left

Teams
- Racine Belles (1945)

Annastasia Batikis (née Stash) (March 15, 1927 – March 12, 2016) was an American center fielder who played for the Racine Belles of the All-American Girls Professional Baseball League (AAGPBL) during the 1945 season. Listed at 4 ft 11 in (1.50 m), 125 lb., she batted and threw left-handed.

== Career ==
Born in Kaukauna, Wisconsin to Greek-American parents, Batikis was one of three descendants of Greek migrants to play in the All-American Girls Professional Baseball League, the others being Kay Lionikas and Vickie Panos. She had two brothers – Alex (who served in the United States Navy from 1943 to 1946) and John. She was first intrigued with playing baseball as a young girl in third grade while watching men play baseball on the playgrounds. When she got older, she joined the Recreation Department League and played softball. She and her high school friends would go out to games where the Racine Belles played and watch in awe the women who played so well.

At 18 years of age and in her senior year in high school, Batikis tried out at the Historic Horlick Field where the Belles played and made the cut. She was then sent to spring training in Chicago, where she got a contract with the Racine team of her home town. At that time only one other woman in the league played for her home town. She believed that playing ball gave her the opportunity to travel, meet all kinds of neat people - helped with self-confidence.

Batikis played for one season because she left the following year to attend college at La Crosse, Wisconsin. She appeared in five games and went hitless in 11 at-bat opportunities.

After her career as a professional baseball player ended, Batikis went on to get a teaching position, working in the educational department for 35 years. She did a significant amount of volunteer work for clubs, churches, ballteams, civic groups to give talks about the League she played in. She also attended Northwestern University.

The AAGPBL folded in 1954, but there is now a permanent display at the Baseball Hall of Fame and Museum at Cooperstown, New York, since November 5, 1988 that honors those who were part of this unique experience. Batikis, along with the rest of the league's girls, is now enshrined in the Hall.

In 2002, Batikis was added to Milwaukee's Walls of Honor, which salutes Wisconsin's baseball history greats. She is also in the Hall of Fame at her old college University of Wisconsin–LaCrosse for being a pioneer for women in professional baseball. In addition, she was inducted into the Hall of Fame at the Washington Park Hall High School in 1987, joining her brother John, who was inducted in 1976.

== See also ==
- List of Greek Americans

== Sources ==
- All-American Girls Professional Baseball League Record Book – W. C. Madden. Publisher: McFarland & Company. Format: Paperback, 294pp. Language: English. ISBN 0-7864-3747-2 ISBN 9780786437474
