= Otto Divosta =

Otto "Buz" Divosta
- Born: June 11, 1934

Otto Divosta (born June 11, 1934) was a principal partner of a major home development company based in South Florida. In the 1970s, he developed a process for building multi-family homes in an assembly line fashion. DiVosta and Clifford F. Burg formed Burg & DiVosta Corp. to combine Burg's construction experience with DiVosta's development company. Since the 1960s, DiVosta has built 40,000 homes in Florida. DiVosta sold his company to Pulte Homes in 1998.

He developed a quick-setting cement used in 1981 to build a three-bedroom, two-bath home, with a two-car garage, in seven hours and 35 minutes. The house was auctioned off with proceeds to be donated to the City of Palm Beach Gardens for a municipal swimming pool. This was believed to be a world record-breaking construction, beating a previous record of 19 hours.

DiVosta introduced a construction method in 1974, unique to South Florida.

In 1996, Divosta bought the Jupiter Theatre from previous owner Burt Reynolds, with plans to reopen with new management.
