= Thomas P. Corbett =

20th century American politician and judge

The Honorable Thomas P. Corbett

Wisconsin Circuit Court Judge for the Racine Circuit, Branch 2
- In office August 1, 1978 – July 31, 1979
- Preceded by: Transitioned from 21st Circ.
- Succeeded by: Stephen A. Simanek

Wisconsin Circuit Court Judge for the 21st Circuit, Branch 2
- In office July 1969 – July 31, 1978
- Preceded by: Position Established
- Succeeded by: Transitioned to Racine Circ.

Member of the Wisconsin State Assembly from the Racine 1st district
- In office January 6, 1941 – January 4, 1943
- Preceded by: John L. Sieb
- Succeeded by: Carl C. Christensen

Personal details
- Born: Thomas Patrick Corbett; September 13, 1914 Marinette, Wisconsin
- Died: May 10, 1995 (aged 80) King, Wisconsin
- Resting place: Calvary Catholic Cemetery; Racine, Wisconsin
- Party: Republican
- Spouses: Lucille K. Tarro; (m. 1942; died 1996)
- Children: 2
- Education: Marquette University Ph.B.; Marquette University Law School LL.B.
- Profession: Lawyer, judge

Military service
- Allegiance: United States
- Branch/service: United States Navy
- Years of service: 1943–1945
- Rank: Lieutenant
- Battles/wars: World War II

Thomas Patrick Corbett (September 15, 1914 – May 10, 1995) was an American lawyer, politician, and judge. He was a Wisconsin Circuit Court Judge for ten years in Racine County. He also served one term in the Wisconsin State Assembly.

== Biography ==
Born in Marinette, Wisconsin, Corbett and his family moved to Racine, Wisconsin, in 1918. Corbett graduated from St. Catherine's High School and then received his bachelor's degree from Marquette University and his law degree from Marquette University Law School. He briefly practiced law, but was elected to the Wisconsin State Assembly in his first year out of law school, representing the city of Racine, Wisconsin, as a Republican. He served in the legislature for two years, then, in 1943, enlisted with the United States Navy for service in World War II.

He returned from the war in 1945 and resumed his law practice. In 1949, the Racine city council appointed him City Attorney, where he remained for the next thirteen years. In 1961, he was elected to one of the newly created branches of the Racine County court and was instrumental in establishing the court in Burlington, Wisconsin, in the far western part of the county. He served there until his election as a judge of the Racine-based 21st circuit in 1969. His service bridged the 1978 reorganization of Wisconsin trial courts, which saw the circuit and county courts merged, and finished his judicial service in 1979 as a judge of the Racine circuit.

After his retirement, Corbett served as a reserve judge in Racine and Waushara counties.

Corbett died at the Veteran's Home in King, Wisconsin.

== Family ==
Corbett married Lucille K. "Terry" Tarro in 1942. They had two children.

== Electoral history ==
Wisconsin Assembly, Racine 1st District Election, 1940
Party	Candidate	Votes	%	±%
Primary Election, September 1940
Republican	Thomas P. Corbett	2,681	46.96%	
Democratic	Adolphe L. Pezanoski	1,747	30.60%	
Progressive	John L. Sieb (incumbent)	1,281	22.44%	
Total votes		'5,709'	'100.0%'	
General Election, November 1940
Republican	Thomas P. Corbett	5,314	43.27%	
Progressive	John L. Sieb (incumbent)	4,102	33.40%	
Democratic	Adolphe L. Pezanoski	2,864	23.32%	
Total votes		'12,280'	'100.0%'	
Republican gain from Progressive				

== Notes ==
Legal offices
Preceded by New branch	Judge for the Racine County Court, Branch 3; 1961 – 1969	Succeeded by Richard G. Harvey, Jr.
Preceded by New branch	Wisconsin Circuit Court Judge for the 21st Circuit, Branch 2; 1969 – 1978	Succeeded by Circuit abolished
Preceded by New circuit	Wisconsin Circuit Court Judge for the Racine Circuit, Branch 2; 1978 – 1979	Succeeded by Stephen A. Simanek
