= Betty Trezza =

- Utility
- Born: August 4, 1925; Brooklyn, New York, U.S.
- Died: January 16, 2007 (aged 81); Brooklyn, New York, U.S.
- Batted: Right Threw: Right

Career statistics
- Batting average: .173
- On-base percentage: .256
- Slugging average: .211

Teams
- Minneapolis Millerettes (1946); Fort Wayne Daisies (1945); South Bend Blue Sox (1945); Racine Belles (1946–1950)

Career highlights and awards
- Two league titles (1946, 1948)

Betty "Moe" Trezza (August 4, 1925 – January 16, 2007) was an American professional baseball player. An infield and outfield utility, she played from 1944 through 1950 for four different teams of the All-American Girls Professional Baseball League (AAGPBL).

Trezza was one of 25 players who made the All-American Girls Professional Baseball League clubs hailed from New York City and State, including Muriel Bevis, Gloria Cordes, Mildred Deegan, Nancy Mudge and Margaret Wigiser. Born in Brooklyn, New York to Italian parents, she was a versatile defensive player with a light bat, being able to play all positions except pitcher and catcher. She entered the league in 1944 with the expansion Minneapolis Millerettes, playing for them one year before joining the Fort Wayne Daisies (1945), South Bend Blue Sox (1946) and Racine Belles (1946–50).

Her most productive season came in the 1946 Series for Racine, when she hit a single to drove in Sophie Kurys with the winning run to give the Belles their second Championship Title. Through the eyes of a fictional young girl, the children's book Dirt on Their Skirts tells the experiences of watching the 1946 championship game of the All-American Girls Professional Baseball League as it goes into extra innings.

Following her baseball career, Trezza worked as a supervisor for data entry at Pfizer, Inc. she was one of the female baseball players popularized in the 1992 film A League of Their Own.

Trezza, who never married, died of a heart attack in her native Brooklyn, New York, aged 81.

== Sources ==
- Dirt on Their Skirts: The Story of the Young Women who Won the World Championship – Doreen Rappaport, Lyndall Callan, E. B. Lewis. Publisher: Penguin Group, 2000. Format: Hardcover, 32pp. Language: English. ISBN 978-0-8037-2042-8
- Superwomen: 100 Women-100 Sports – Jodi Buren, Donna A. Lopiano, Billie Jean King. Publisher: Bulfinch Press, 2004. Format: Paperback, 192pp. Language: English. ISBN 978-0-8212-2896-8
- The Women of the All-American Girls Professional Baseball League: A Biographical Dictionary - W. C. Madden. Publisher: McFarland & Company, 2005. Format: Paperback, 295pp. Language: English. ISBN 0-7864-3747-2
