= Leo Murphy (baseball) =

American baseball player (1889–1960)

- Catcher
- Born: January 7, 1889; Terre Haute, Indiana, U.S.
- Died: August 12, 1960 (aged 71); Racine, Wisconsin, U.S.
- Batted: Right Threw: Right

MLB debut
- May 2, 1915, for the Pittsburgh Pirates

Last MLB appearance
- September 25, 1915, for the Pittsburgh Pirates

MLB statistics
- Games played: 31
- At bats: 41
- Hits: 4
- Stats at Baseball Reference

Teams
- Pittsburgh Pirates (1915)

Leo Joseph "Red" Murphy (January 7, 1889 – August 12, 1960) was an American catcher in Major League Baseball who played for the Pittsburgh Pirates during the 1915 season. Listed at 6 ft 1 in (1.85 m), 179 lb, Murphy batted and threw right-handed. He was born in Terre Haute, Indiana.

Murphy started his professional career in 1912 with Double-A Columbus Senators of the American Association. He spent three years in the Minor leagues before joining the Pirates early in the 1915 season. While in Pittsburgh, he served as a backup for regular catcher George Gibson. He hit .098 (4-for-41) in 31 games, including four RBI and four runs scored.

Following his majors career, Murphy returned to minor league action for five more years between 1916 and 1927. In a nine-season career, he was a .255 hitter with 15 home runs in 801 games. He later coached in the minors and also managed during five years in the All-American Girls Professional Baseball League for the Racine Belles, leading them to three consecutive playoff appearances, including the Championship Title in 1946. He posted a combined 310–259 record for a .554 winning percentage.

Murphy was a longtime resident of Racine, Wisconsin, where he died at the age of 71.

== Fact ==
- The All-American Girls Professional Baseball League folded in 1954, but there is now a permanent display at the Baseball Hall of Fame and Museum at Cooperstown, New York, since November 5, 1988, that honors those who were part of this unique experience. Murphy, along with the rest of the league, is now enshrined in the Hall.

== Sources ==
- All-American Girls Professional Baseball League entry
- Baseball.Reference.com – major league statistics
- Baseball.Reference.com – minor league statistics
