= 2003 in baseball =

The following are the baseball events of the year 2003 throughout the world.

== Headline events of the year ==
- The Florida Marlins become World Series champions, beating the New York Yankees, 4-2.
- The Detroit Tigers had one of the worst records in baseball history, going 43-119, a .265 winning percentage.
- The Chicago Cubs just missed advancing to their first World Series since 1945, as they blew a 3-1 series lead against the Marlins in the 2003 NLCS.
- The Oakland Athletics blew a 2-0 series lead against the Boston Red Sox in the 2003 ALDS, making it four straight years they lost the ALDS in five games, including an 0-9 mark in games in which they could have clinched the series.
- The Yankees beat the Red Sox in a thrilling ALCS, highlighted by Aaron Boone's walk-off home run in the 11th inning in Game 7 off Tim Wakefield.

== Champions ==
=== Major League Baseball ===
- Regular Season Champions

| League | Eastern Division Champion | Central Division Champion | Western Division Champion | Wild Card Qualifier |
|---|---|---|---|---|
| American League | New York Yankees | Minnesota Twins | Oakland Athletics | Boston Red Sox |
| National League | Atlanta Braves | Chicago Cubs | San Francisco Giants | Florida Marlins |

- World Series Champion – Florida Marlins
- Postseason – September 30 to October 25

Division Series; TV: ESPN/FOX
1 | New York Yankees | 3
3 | Minnesota Twins | 1
American League
2 | Oakland Athletics | 2
4 | Boston Red Sox | 3
1 | Atlanta Braves | 2
3 | Chicago Cubs | 3
National League
2 | San Francisco Giants | 1
4 | Florida Marlins | 3

League Championship Series; TV: FOX
1 | New York Yankees | 4
4 | Boston Red Sox | 3
3 | Chicago Cubs | 3
4 | Florida Marlins | 4

World Series; TV: FOX
AL1 | New York Yankees | 2
NL4 | Florida Marlins | 4

Click on any series score to link to that series' page.
Higher seed has home field advantage during Division Series and League Championship Series.
American League has home field advantage during World Series as a result of the American League victory in the 2003 All-Star Game.
American League is seeded 1-3/2-4 as a result of AL regular season champion (New York Yankees) and AL wild card (Boston Red Sox) coming from the same division.
National League is seeded 1-3/2-4 as a result of NL regular season champion (Atlanta Braves) and NL wild card (Florida Marlins) coming from the same division.

- Postseason MVPs
  - World Series MVP – Josh Beckett
  - ALCS MVP – Mariano Rivera
  - NLCS MVP – Iván Rodríguez
- All-Star Game, July 15 at U.S. Cellular Field – American League, 7-6; Garret Anderson, MVP
  - Home Run Derby, July 14 – Garret Anderson, Anaheim Angels

=== Other champions ===
- Canadian Baseball League: Calgary Outlaws by virtue of having best record at the All-Star break (truncated season)
- Caribbean World Series: Águilas Cibaeñas (Dominican Republic)
- College World Series: Rice
- Cuban National Series: Industriales def. Villa Clara
- European Championship: Netherlands over Greece (2-0)
- European Cup: Neptunus (Netherlands) over Rimini (Italy)
- Japan Series: Fukuoka Daiei Hawks over Hanshin Tigers (4-3)
- Korean Series: Hyundai Unicorns over SK Wyverns (4-3)
- Big League World Series: Easley, South Carolina
- Junior League World Series: La Mirada, California
- Little League World Series: Musashi-Fuchu, Tokyo, Japan
- Senior League World Series: Hilo, Hawaii
- Mexican League: Diablos Rojos del México
- Pan American Games: Cuba over USA (3-1)
- Taiwan Series: Brother Elephants over Sinon Bulls (4-2)

== Awards and honors ==
- Baseball Hall of Fame
  - Gary Carter
  - Eddie Murray
- Most Valuable Player
  - Alex Rodríguez, Texas Rangers, SS (AL)
  - Barry Bonds, San Francisco Giants, OF (NL)
- Cy Young Award
  - Roy Halladay, Toronto Blue Jays (AL)
  - Éric Gagné, Los Angeles Dodgers (NL)
- Rookie of the Year
  - Ángel Berroa, Kansas City Royals, SS (AL)
  - Dontrelle Willis, Florida Marlins, P (NL)
- Manager of the Year Award
  - Tony Peña, Kansas City Royals (AL)
  - Jack McKeon, Florida Marlins (NL)
- Woman Executive of the Year (major or minor league): Luchy Guerra, Los Angeles Dodgers, National League

== Statistical leaders ==
| | American League | | National League |
| Type | Name | Stat | Name | Stat |
| AVG | Bill Mueller BOS | .326 | Albert Pujols STL | .359 |
| HR | Alex Rodriguez TEX | 47 | Jim Thome PHI | 47 |
| RBI | Carlos Delgado TOR | 145 | Preston Wilson COL | 141 |
| Wins | Roy Halladay TOR | 22 | Russ Ortiz ATL | 21 |
| ERA | Pedro Martínez BOS | 2.22 | Jason Schmidt SF | 2.34 |
| SO | Esteban Loaiza CWS | 207 | Kerry Wood CHC | 266 |
| SV | Keith Foulke OAK | 43 | Éric Gagné LAD | 55 |
| SB | Carl Crawford TB | 55 | Juan Pierre FLA | 65 |

== Major League Baseball final standings ==
American League
| Rank | Club | Wins | Losses | Win % | GB |
East Division
| 1st | New York Yankees | 101 | 61 | .623 | -- |
| 2nd | Boston Red Sox * | 95 | 67 | .586 | 6.0 |
| 3rd | Toronto Blue Jays | 86 | 76 | .531 | 15.0 |
| 4th | Baltimore Orioles | 71 | 91 | .438 | 30.0 |
| 5th | Tampa Bay Devil Rays | 63 | 99 | .389 | 38.0 |
Central Division
| 1st | Minnesota Twins | 90 | 72 | .556 | -- |
| 2nd | Chicago White Sox | 86 | 76 | .531 | 4.0 |
| 3rd | Kansas City Royals | 83 | 79 | .512 | 7.0 |
| 4th | Cleveland Indians | 68 | 94 | .420 | 22.0 |
| 5th | Detroit Tigers | 43 | 119 | .265 | 47.0 |
West Division
| 1st | Oakland Athletics | 96 | 66 | .593 | -- |
| 2nd | Seattle Mariners | 93 | 69 | .574 | 3.0 |
| 3rd | Anaheim Angels | 77 | 85 | .475 | 19.0 |
| 4th | Texas Rangers | 71 | 91 | .438 | 25.0 |

National League
| Rank | Club | Wins | Losses | Win % | GB |
East Division
| 1st | Atlanta Braves | 101 | 61 | .623 | -- |
| 2nd | Florida Marlins * | 91 | 71 | .562 | 10.0 |
| 3rd | Philadelphia Phillies | 86 | 76 | .531 | 15.0 |
| 4th | Montreal Expos | 83 | 79 | .512 | 18.0 |
| 5th | New York Mets | 66 | 95 | .410 | 34.5 |
Central Division
| 1st | Chicago Cubs | 88 | 74 | .543 | -- |
| 2nd | Houston Astros | 87 | 75 | .537 | 1.0 |
| 3rd | St. Louis Cardinals | 85 | 77 | .525 | 3.0 |
| 4th | Pittsburgh Pirates | 75 | 87 | .463 | 13.0 |
| 5th | Cincinnati Reds | 69 | 93 | .426 | 19.0 |
| 6th | Milwaukee Brewers | 68 | 94 | .420 | 20.0 |
West Division
| 1st | San Francisco Giants | 100 | 61 | .621 | -- |
| 2nd | Los Angeles Dodgers | 85 | 77 | .525 | 15.5 |
| 3rd | Arizona Diamondbacks | 84 | 78 | .519 | 16.5 |
| 4th | Colorado Rockies | 74 | 88 | .457 | 26.5 |
| 5th | San Diego Padres | 64 | 98 | .395 | 36.5 |

- The asterisk denotes the club that won the wild card for its respective league.

== Events ==
=== January ===
- January 7 – Gary Carter and Eddie Murray are elected into the Major League Baseball Hall of Fame.
- January 22 – After having been released by the Minnesota Twins at the close of the 2002 season, David Ortiz signs with the Boston Red Sox.

=== February ===
- February 17 – Baltimore Orioles pitcher Steve Bechler dies at the age of 23 of a heat stroke during spring training in Fort Lauderdale, Florida. A medical examiner found that Bechler's use of ephedra as a weight-loss supplement contributed to his death. Following this revelation, the Food and Drug Administration opened an inquiry, which resulted in the banning of ephedra products in the United States.

=== March ===
- March 31 – In the first-ever game at the Great American Ball Park the visiting Pittsburgh Pirates defeat the Cincinnati Reds 10-1. Ken Griffey Jr. collects the first hit in the stadium's history.

=== April ===
- April 3 – At 27 years, 249 days of age, Alex Rodriguez becomes the youngest player in major league history to hit 300 home runs. The Texas Rangers shortstop's fifth inning, three-run blast surpasses Hall of Famer Jimmie Foxx's mark, who accomplished the feat at 27 years, 328 days of age.
- April 4 – Sammy Sosa hits his 500th career home run, off Cincinnati Reds pitcher Scott Sullivan in the seventh inning at Great American Ball Park, becoming only the 18th player in major league history to hit 500 or more home runs, as well as the first Hispanic to do so.
- April 11 – The Montreal Expos defeat the New York Mets‚ 10–0‚ in their first of 22 home games they play in Puerto Rico this season.
- April 27 – Kevin Millwood of the Philadelphia Phillies pitches a no-hitter against the San Francisco Giants, striking out ten while walking three. Ricky Ledée's first-inning solo home run provides the game's only scoring.

=== May ===
- May 5 – Matt Stairs' home run off Houston Astros pitcher Wade Miller is estimated at 461 feet, making it the longest home run in the history of Minute Maid Park.
- May 10 – Jeff Torborg is fired as manager of the Florida Marlins after a 16-22 start. Jack McKeon is hired as his replacement.
- May 11 – Rafael Palmeiro hits his 500th career home run, off Cleveland Indians pitcher Dave Elder, becoming only the 19th player in major league history to reach the 500 mark.
- May 18 – The Texas Rangers defeat the New York Yankees 5-1 to complete their first-ever three-game sweep of the Yankees at Yankee Stadium. John Thomson goes the distance for the victory, giving up only three hits and striking out nine.
- May 23 – Geremi González earns his first major league victory in nearly five years as the Tampa Bay Devil Rays beat the Anaheim Angels 3-1. González wins for the first time since June 28, 1998, while with the Chicago Cubs. He had elbow surgery in 1998 and 1999 before the Cubs released him in 2001.
- May 25 – The Toronto Blue Jays completed their first four-game sweep ever against the New York Yankees, winning 5–3 at Yankee Stadium and sending New York to its seventh consecutive home loss. The Yankees also dropped their season-high fourth in a row overall, a skid that thus dropped them out of the American League East lead, while their slump at Yankee Stadium was their worst since they lost 10 straight in the 1986 season. Now New York has lost 11 of their last 12 at home.
- May 26 – The Gary SouthShore RailCats play their inaugural home opener at the U.S. Steel Yard versus the Schaumburg Flyers.
- May 28 – Rafael Furcal, Mark DeRosa and Gary Sheffield hit home runs off Cincinnati Reds pitcher Jeff Austin in the bottom of the first inning, as the Atlanta Braves become only the second team in big league history to begin a game with three consecutive home runs. On April 13, 1987, the San Diego Padres' Marvell Wynne, Tony Gwynn and John Kruk did the same in the bottom of the first inning off San Francisco Giants starter Roger Mason.

=== June ===
- June 3 – Sammy Sosa is ejected from a game against the Tampa Bay Devil Rays for using a corked bat.
- June 11 – The Houston Astros set a major league record for combined pitchers in a no-hitter with six, against the New York Yankees. The pitchers are Roy Oswalt, Pete Munro, Kirk Saarloos, Brad Lidge, Octavio Dotel and Billy Wagner.
- June 13 – New York Yankees pitcher Roger Clemens becomes the 21st pitcher in major league history to win 300 games and only the third pitcher to record 4,000 career strikeouts as he defeats the St. Louis Cardinals 5-2.
- June 23 – At AT&T Park, Barry Bonds of the San Francisco Giants becomes the first Major Leaguer with 500 career home runs and 500 career steals. After drawing a base on balls leading off the 11th inning, Bonds steals second, then eventually scores on Benito Santiago's single for the winning run in a 3-2 victory over the Los Angeles Dodgers.
- June 27 – The Boston Red Sox score a record-setting 10 runs in the first inning against the Florida Marlins before recording an out. Two Marlins pitchers, starter Carl Pavano and reliever Michael Tejera, pitch to a combined 11 batters and would not record an out. The Red Sox score 14 runs in the first inning, which ties the American League record. Johnny Damon ties the modern-day record for hits in an inning with three.

=== July ===
- July 15 – At U.S. Cellular Field, the American League wins the All-Star Game, beating the National League 7-6. Hank Blalock connects for a two-run, pinch-hit home run off Éric Gagné in the eighth inning to lead the rally. Garret Anderson is named the MVP, coming just one triple shy of hitting for the cycle in going 3-for-4 with a home run and two RBI. Brendan Donnelly is the winning pitcher, while Keith Foulke gets the save.
- July 27 – Gary Carter and Eddie Murray are inducted into the National Baseball Hall of Fame.
- July 29 – Against the Texas Rangers at The Ballpark in Arlington, Bill Mueller of the Boston Red Sox, in hitting three home runs, becomes the first player to hit a grand slam from each side of the plate in the same game. After hitting a solo home run off starter R. A. Dickey in the third, Mueller homers in the seventh with the bases loaded against left-hander Aaron Fultz. One inning later he hits his second grand slam, this time against right-hander Jay Powell. With the three home runs, Mueller drives in nine runs; the Red Sox defeat the Rangers 14-7.

=== August ===
- August 10 – Atlanta Braves shortstop Rafael Furcal becomes the twelfth player to turn an unassisted triple play in the fifth inning of a 3-2 loss to the St. Louis Cardinals.
- August 14 – The Northeast blackout of 2003 forces the cancellation of the game between the San Francisco Giants and New York Mets scheduled to be played that night at Shea Stadium. The game was ultimately not made up. Earlier that day, Giants left fielder Barry Bonds left the team to spend time with his ailing father Bobby Bonds and was placed on baseball's bereavement list which was created earlier that year.
- August 23 – Ron Guidry has his number 49 retired by the New York Yankees.
- August 30 – Barry Bonds of the San Francisco Giants homers against Randy Johnson of the Arizona Diamondbacks in his first game back since the death of his father Bobby Bonds one week prior. Bonds would later leave the game with an accelerated heart rate as the Giants would go on to win the game 2-1.

=== September ===
- September 5 – The Detroit Tigers' Mike Maroth becomes the first major league pitcher in 23 years to lose 20 games in a season when Detroit loses to the Toronto Blue Jays 8-6. Maroth (6-20) allows eight runs and nine hits in three-plus innings. The Oakland Athletics' Brian Kingman goes 8-20 in 1980.
- September 10 – The St. Louis Cardinals' Tony La Russa becomes the eighth manager in major league history to reach 2,000 wins as the Cardinals beat the Colorado Rockies 10–2. The 58-year-old La Russa posts a 2,000-1,782 record in 25 seasons with the Chicago White Sox, Oakland Athletics and St. Louis.
- September 14 – At Comerica Park, the Detroit Tigers set a franchise record for losses as they drop their 110th defeat, to the Kansas City Royals, 7-2.
- September 17 – In the Boston Red Sox' 7-0 loss to the Tampa Bay Devil Rays, Todd Walker's ninth-inning double is the Red Sox's 608th extra base hit of the season, breaking the major league record set by the 1996 Seattle Mariners.
- September 20 – Unlike this season, when the Montreal Expos play 25% of their home games in San Juan, Puerto Rico, the players vote to play their entire 2004 home schedule in Montreal. MLB owners, who collectively own the franchise, are still considering moving the Expos permanently to Washington, D.C., Portland, Oregon or Monterrey, Mexico, or continuing the present format by having the team split home games between different locations (Puerto Rico or Mexico and Montreal).
- September 21 – Second baseman Marcus Giles hits a home run off Brad Penny's 3-2 pitch, as the Atlanta Braves tie the NL record by having six players hit at least 20 home runs in a season. Along with Giles, Javy López, Gary Sheffield, Andruw Jones, Chipper Jones and Vinny Castilla equal the mark established by Eddie Mathews (32), Hank Aaron (32), Joe Torre (27), Felipe Alou (23), Mack Jones (31) and Gene Oliver (21) of the 1965 Milwaukee Braves.
- September 22:
  - The Detroit Tigers set an AL record with their 118th loss, falling 12-6 to the Kansas City Royals. The Philadelphia Athletics (36-117) had held the record. The Tigers finish the season with a 43-119 record. The 1962 Mets are the only team in history with a record worse than the 2003 Tigers.
  - Second baseman Alfonso Soriano breaks a major league season record by hitting his 13th leadoff home run of the year in the New York Yankees' 10-inning loss to the Chicago White Sox.
- September 25 – First baseman Carlos Delgado of the Toronto Blue Jays becomes the fifteenth player in Major League history to hit four home runs, including his 300th career home run, in one game helping Toronto beat the Tampa Bay Devil Rays, 10-8.
- September 28
  - The Atlanta Braves defeat the Philadelphia Phillies, 5-2, in the last game played at Philadelphia's Veterans Stadium.
  - The Colorado Rockies defeat the San Diego Padres, 10-8, in the final Padres game played at Qualcomm Stadium.

=== October ===
- October 14 – In Game 6 of the NLCS, with the Chicago Cubs just five outs away from eliminating the Florida Marlins, Cubs fan Steve Bartman deflects a foul fly ball away from Cubs left fielder Moisés Alou, allowing Florida's Luis Castillo to continue batting. The Cubs then proceed to fall apart, allowing eight runs in the inning to lose Game 6; they go on to lose Game 7, to continue the "Curse of the Billy Goat". The Marlins go on to win the World Series, and Bartman becomes a pariah in Chicago.
- October 16 – In Game 7 of the ALCS, Aaron Boone's walk-off home run off Tim Wakefield in the 11th inning ends a thrilling series between the New York Yankees and Boston Red Sox. Boston blows a three-run, eighth inning lead when Grady Little keeps ace Pedro Martínez in the game arguably too long instead of going to relief help from Alan Embree or Mike Timlin. The loss, which turns out to be the last manifestation of the "Curse of the Bambino", costs Little his job.
- October 22 – Roger Clemens of the New York Yankees starts Game 4 of the World Series and pitches seven strong innings before exiting the game to a standing ovation from both the crowd in attendance and the Florida Marlins (who left their dugout to join in), presumably because it was to be his final career start, having announced his retirement at the start of the season. The ovation would prove premature as Clemens came out of the retirement to sign with the Houston Astros before the 2004 season. The Marlins would eventually win the game, 4–3, on a 12th inning walk-off home run by Álex González to even the series at two games apiece.
- October 25 – In Game 6 of the World Series at Yankee Stadium, Josh Beckett, on three days' rest, pitches a 2–0, five-hit shutout over the favored New York Yankees, to give the Florida Marlins their second championship in 11 seasons. Beckett receives Series MVP honors.

=== November ===
- November 22 – 46–year old relief pitcher Jesse Orosco agrees to a minor league contract with the Arizona Diamondbacks and earns an $800,000 salary if he is added to the big league roster. He retires before the start of the 2004 season.
- November 26 – Hoping to add punch to their lineup, the Oakland Athletics trade catcher Ramón Hernández and disgruntled outfielder Terrence Long to the San Diego Padres in exchange for outfielder Mark Kotsay.
- November 28 – The Boston Red Sox send pitchers Casey Fossum, Brandon Lyon, Jorge de la Rosa, and a minor leaguer (Michel Goss) to the Arizona Diamondbacks in exchange for starter Curt Schilling.

== Books ==
- Moneyball: The Art of Winning an Unfair Game, written by Michael Lewis, is an examination of the present-day Oakland Athletics as run by their general manager Billy Beane, and how the application of sabermetric principles has allowed the A's to be competitive despite having one of the lowest payrolls in baseball.
- Perfect I'm Not: Boomer on Beer, Brawls, Backaches, and Baseball, written by David Wells

== Births ==
=== January ===
- January 1 – Yanquiel Fernández
- January 6 – Andry Lara
- January 16 – Chase Burns
- January 20 – Carson Benge
- January 27 – Lucas Spence
- January 29 – James Triantos
- January 31 – Joshua Kuroda-Grauer

=== February ===
- February 3 – Hao-Yu Lee
- February 6 – Sam Antonacci
- February 6 – Cameron Cauley
- February 7 – Jasson Domínguez
- February 9 – Jac Caglianone
- February 10 – Jackson Kent
- February 21 – Harry Ford
- February 22 – Cam Smith
- February 28 – Emmanuel Rodríguez

=== March ===
- March 2 – Tommy White
- March 12 – Nick Kurtz

=== April ===
- April 4 – Chase Petty
- April 6 – Edgar Quero
- April 9 – Tanner McDougal
- April 10 – Andrew Painter
- April 11 – Nacho Alvarez Jr.
- April 11 – Adael Amador
- April 12 – Gage Jump
- April 14 – Luis De León
- April 14 – Luis Perales
- April 15 – Eury Pérez
- April 16 – Braden Montgomery
- April 16 – Kahlil Watson
- April 19 – Jackson Merrill

=== May ===
- May 3 – Alimber Santa
- May 7 – Nick Morabito
- May 26 – Sean Keys

=== June ===
- June 4 – Brady House
- June 13 – Eduardo Rivera
- June 19 – Jonah Tong
- June 21 – Deyvison De Los Santos
- June 22 – José Corniell
- June 25 – Carson Williams
- June 26 – JR Ritchie
- June 28 – Joshua Báez

=== July ===
- July 3 – Mitch Bratt
- July 3 – Carter Jensen
- July 5 – Junior Caminero
- July 28 – Trey Yesavage
- July 29 – Cole Young

=== August ===
- August 4 – Henry Bolte
- August 5 – Noah Schultz
- August 9 – Yunior Marte
- August 18 – Elmer Rodríguez
- August 19 – Hagen Smith
- August 25 – Edwin Arroyo

=== September ===
- September 1 – Antwone Kelly
- September 22 – José Fernández
- September 22 – Carlos Jorge
- September 27 – Owen Murphy

=== November ===
- November 8 – Moisés Ballesteros
- November 16 – Bradgley Rodriguez

=== December ===
- December 4 – Jackson Holliday
- December 7 – Sal Stewart
- December 17 – Caden Dana
- December 19 – Robby Snelling

== Deaths ==
=== January ===
- January 2 – Bud Metheny, 87, World War II-era New York Yankees' outfielder who played all but three of his 376 big-league games during the wartime seasons of 1943–1945; member of 1943 World Series champions.
- January 3 – Joe Ostrowski, 86, pitcher for the St. Louis Browns and New York Yankees in five seasons from 1948 to 1952, who was also a part of three Yankees World Series champion teams between 1950 and 1952.
- January 3 – Jim Westlake, 72, pinch-hitter for the 1955 Philadelphia Phillies.
- January 6 – Jarvis Tatum, 56, center fielder who played from 1968 to 1970 for the California Angels.
- January 7 – Ed Albosta, 84, pitcher who appeared in 19 career games for the Brooklyn Dodgers (1941) and Pittsburgh Pirates (1946), posting an 0–8 record and 6.15 earned run average.
- January 9 – Don Landrum, 66, speedy center fielder who played for the Philadelphia Phillies, St. Louis Cardinals, Chicago Cubs and San Francisco Giants in part of eight seasons spanning 1957–1966.
- January 11 – Durwood Merrill, 64, American League umpire from 1977 to 1999 who worked in the 1988 World Series, five ALCS, and two All-Star games.
- January 13 – Ernie Rudolph, 93, relief pitcher for the 1945 Brooklyn Dodgers.
- January 14 – Earl Lawson, 79, sportswriter who covered the Cincinnati Reds from 1949 to 1985, often drawing criticism for his harsh commentary on players.
- January 14 – Johnny Ritchey, 80, catcher who is recognized as the first African American man to play organized baseball in the twentieth century, as he won batting titles in both the Negro leagues and the Minor Leagues.
- January 16 – Phil McCullough, 85, pitcher who appeared in one game for the Washington Senators during the 1942 season.
- January 17 – Claire Schillace, 76, All-Star center fielder for the Racine Belles of the All-American Girls Professional Baseball League.
- January 19 – Dutch Meyer, 87, second baseman who played with the Chicago Cubs, Detroit Tigers and Cleveland Indians in a span of six seasons from 1937 to 1946.
- January 25 – Toby Atwell, 78, catcher who played from 1952 through 1956 for the Chicago Cubs, Pittsburgh Pirates and Milwaukee Braves.
- January 27 – Bob Kammeyer, 52, pitcher for the New York Yankees from 1978 to 1979, who later was named the Pitcher of the Year for the International League while pitching for the Syracuse Chiefs.

=== February ===
- February 4 – Marie Menheer, 78, AAGPBL pitcher.
- February 4 – Jim Mertz, 86, pitcher for the 1943 Washington Senators.
- February 9 – Billy Parker, 56, second baseman who played from 1971 to 1973 with the California Angels.
- February 10 – Chuck Aleno, 85, third baseman for the Cincinnati Reds from 1941 to 1944, who set the Major League record for the longest hitting streak to start a career by hitting in 17 consecutive games.
- February 10 – Ralph Beard, 73, pitcher for the 1954 St. Louis Cardinals.
- February 12 – Wally Burnette, 73, pitcher who played from 1956 through 1958 for the Kansas City Athletics.
- February 12 – Haywood Sullivan, 72, general partner/co-owner of the Boston Red Sox from May 23, 1978 through November 23, 1993 and general manager from October 24, 1977 through June 5, 1984, when he became CEO; previously a catcher in 312 games over seven seasons for the Red Sox and Kansas City Athletics between 1955 and 1963; manager of the Athletics from May 16, 1965 through the end of that season, when he joined the Red Sox front office as vice president, player personnel on November 28.
- February 12 – Dick Whitman, 82, outfielder who played from 1946 to 1956 for the Brooklyn Dodgers and Philadelphia Phillies, as well as a member of the Dodgers and Phillies teams that clinched the National League pennant in 1949 and 1950, respectively.
- February 17 – Steve Bechler, 23, pitching prospect who made three relief appearances for the 2002 Baltimore Orioles.
- February 21 – Rusty Peters, 88, middle infielder and third baseman who played for the Philadelphia Athletics, Cleveland Indians and St. Louis Browns in a span of ten seasons from 1936 to 1947.
- February 27 – Edythe Perlick, 80, three-time AAGPBL All-Star outfielder.
- February 28 – Jim Fridley, 78, outfielder for the Cleveland Indians, Baltimore Orioles and Cincinnati Redlegs between 1952 and 1958, as well as one of 13 players involved in one of the largest transactions in major league history, which was made between Baltimore and the New York Yankees in December 1954.

=== March ===
- March 2 – Joe Decker, 55, pitcher who played for the Chicago Cubs, Minnesota Twins and Seattle Mariners in a span of nine seasons between 1969 and 1979.
- March 6 – Mickey Kreitner, 80, catcher who played for the Chicago Cubs during the 1943 and 1944 seasons.
- March 7 – Al Libke, 84, outfielder who played from 1945 to 1946 for the Cincinnati Reds.
- March 8 – Mickey McGowan, 81, pitcher for the 1948 New York Giants.
- March 11 – Alta Cohen, 94, outfielder who played with the Brooklyn Robins/Dodgers in the 1931 and 1932 seasons, and for the Philadelphia Phillies in 1933.
- March 14 – Al Gionfriddo, 81, Brooklyn Dodgers outfielder forever remembered for his heroic post-season play in the 1947 World Series against the New York Yankees, when he caught Joe DiMaggio's long drive to left field in Game 6, saving an 8–6 win for the Dodgers at Yankee Stadium in what was Gionfriddo's last major-league game; he appeared in 228 MLB regular-season games over four years, 191 of them for the Pittsburgh Pirates (1944–1947), and 37 for the Dodgers (May 3 through the end of the 1947 campaign).
- March 14 – Ron Shoop, 71, catcher for the 1959 Detroit Tigers.
- March 19 – Joe Buzas, 84, reserve shortstop for the 1945 New York Yankees, who later operated 82 minor league franchises in his 47 years as an owner.
- March 21 – Harry Eisenstat, 87, pitcher who played from 1935 through 1942 for the Brooklyn Dodgers, Detroit Tigers and Cleveland Indians.
- March 28 – Sam Bowens, 64, outfielder who played from 1963 through 1969 for the Baltimore Orioles and Washington Senators.

=== April ===
- April 2 – Hilly Flitcraft, 79, pitcher for the 1942 Philadelphia Phillies.
- April 9 – Ray Murray, 85, catcher who played for the Cleveland Indians, Philadelphia Athletics and Baltimore Orioles in part of five seasons spanning 1948–1954.
- April 14 – Al Epperly, 84, pitcher who worked in 14 total games for the Chicago Cubs (1938) and Brooklyn Dodgers (1950).
- April 18 – Lefty Sloat, 84, pitcher who appeared in nine games from 1948 to 1949 for the Brooklyn Dodgers and Chicago Cubs.
- April 19 – Chris Zachary, 59, relief pitcher who played for the Houston Colt .45s/Astros, Kansas City Royals, St. Louis Cardinals, Detroit Tigers and Pittsburgh Pirates over nine seasons between 1963 and 1973.
- April 23 – Sidney Shlenker, 66, sports executive and entrepreneur; president of the Houston Astros in 1975 and 1976.
- April 24 – Fuzz White, 86, center fielder who played with the St. Louis Browns in the 1940 season and for the New York Giants in 1947.
- April 26 – Danny Napoleon, 61, outfielder who played from 1965 to 1966 with the New York Mets.

=== May ===
- May 6 – Art Houtteman, 75, pitcher who went 87–91 (4.14) in 325 games for the Detroit Tigers (1945–1950 and 1952–1953), Cleveland Indians (1953–1957) and Baltimore Orioles (1957); 1950 American League All-Star.
- May 8 – Slick Coffman, 92, pitcher who spent 18 years in baseball, including four seasons with the Detroit Tigers and St. Louis Browns from 1937 to 1940, whose career highlight came in his major league debut, defeating the Boston Red Sox in an 11-inning, 4–2 victory, and winning a pitching duel with Lefty Grove.
- May 8 – Dorothy Ferguson, 80, Canadian infielder and outfielder in the AAGPBL from 1945 to 1954.
- May 8 – Sam Lacy, 99, sportswriter for several decades in Washington, Chicago and Baltimore, who championed the sport's integration and was one of the BBWAA's first black members.
- May 14 – Dave DeBusschere, 62, pitcher for the Chicago White Sox from 1962 to 1963, who is one of only 13 athletes to have played in both Major League Baseball and the National Basketball Association, being inducted to the Basketball Hall of Fame as player and the College Basketball Hall of Fame as coach.

=== June ===
- June 1 – Johnny Hopp, 86, All-Star outfielder and first baseman who batted .300 or higher five times, while winning World Series rings with the St. Louis Cardinals in 1942 and 1944 and with the New York Yankees in 1950 and 1951.
- June 1 – Pete Sivess, 89, pitcher who appeared in 62 career games for the 1936–1938 Philadelphia Phillies.
- June 2 – Makoto Kozuru, 80, Hall of Fame outfielder and infielder that played for five teams across 17 seasons in the Japanese Baseball League and NPB
- June 6 – Ray Medeiros, 77, pinch runner who appeared in one game for the Cincinnati Reds in 1945.
- June 7 – Greg Garrett, 56, pitcher who played for the California Angels and Cincinnati Reds in a span of two seasons from 1970 to 1971.
- June 13 – Gene Hayden, 68, relief pitcher who appeared in three games for the Cincinnati Redlegs in 1958.
- June 18 – Larry Doby, 79, Hall of Fame center fielder and a seven-time All-Star, and the first black player in American League history, debuting July 5, 1947; posted a career .283 batting average with 253 home runs and 970 RBI in 13 seasons, leading the AL in home runs twice and collecting 100 or more RBI five times; member of two Cleveland Indians pennant-winning teams (1948, 1954) and 1948 World Series champion; became second African-American manager in MLB annals (after Frank Robinson) when he was named pilot of the Chicago White Sox on July 1, 1978; Cleveland retired his uniform #14 in 1994; also played for White Sox and Detroit Tigers, and coached in MLB for the Indians, White Sox and Montreal Expos.
- June 22 – Harry Kinzy, 92, pitcher for the 1934 Chicago White Sox.
- June 22 – Leonard Koppett, 79, sportswriter and author who worked both in New York and on the West Coast.
- June 23 – Bob "Riverboat" Smith, 75, left-handed pitcher who appeared in 30 games over parts of 1958 and 1959 for the Boston Red Sox, Chicago Cubs and Cleveland Indians.
- June 24 – Jack Bruner, 78, pitcher for the Chicago White Sox and St. Louis Browns between the 1949 and 1950 seasons.

=== July ===
- July 1 – Bill Miller, 75, who pitched from 1952 through 1955 for the New York Yankees and Baltimore Orioles.
- July 3 – Vince Lloyd, 76, Chicago sportscaster; member of Cubs or White Sox radio/TV broadcast teams between 1954 and 1986.
- July 6 – Ed Chandler, 81, pitcher for the 1947 Brooklyn Dodgers.
- July 7 – Ribs Raney, 80, pitcher who played from 1949 to 1950 for the St. Louis Browns.
- July 12 – Patricia Courtney, 71, infielder for the Grand Rapids Chicks and the Chicago Colleens of the All-American Girls Professional Baseball League.
- July 19 – Dorothy Stolze, 80, one of the most versatile utility players in All-American Girls Professional Baseball League history.
- July 23 – Juan Delis, 75, Cuban third baseman and outfielder who appeared in 54 games for the 1955 Washington Senators.
- July 23 – Grady Wilson, 80, shortstop who appeared in 12 games for the Pittsburgh Pirates in 1948.
- July 25 – Norm McRae, 55, pitcher who played from 1969 to 1970 for the Detroit Tigers.
- July 27 – Bob Hope, 100, comedian and movie star who was part-owner of the Cleveland Indians in the 1950s, as he performed his signature song Thanks for the Memory in 1993 as the Indians ended 60 years of games played at Municipal Stadium.
- July 27 – Rinty Monahan, 75, relief pitcher for the 1953 Philadelphia Athletics.
- July 29 – George Maloney, 75, American League umpire who worked 2,159 regular-season games, the 1975 World Series, and three All-Star games over his 15-season (1969–1983) career.
- July 29 – Jim Pruett, 85, catcher who played from 1944 to 1945 with the Philadelphia Athletics.
- July 30 – Gene Hasson, 88, first baseman for the Philadelphia Athletics in two seasons from 1937 to 1938.

=== August ===
- August 7 – Mickey McDermott, 74, pitcher who won 18 games for the 1953 Boston Red Sox, but whose colorful personal life overshadowed his play; compiled 69–69 record for six MLB teams over 12 seasons spanning 1948–1961.
- August 9 – Billy Rogell, 98, shortstop who played 1,482 games for three MLB clubs over 14 seasons between 1925 and 1940, principally for the 1930–1939 Detroit Tigers; started at short for Detroit's back-to-back AL champions of 1934–1935, including franchise's first-ever World Series champs of 1935.
- August 13 – Charlie Devens, 93, pitcher for the New York Yankees in three seasons from 1932 to 1934, who at the time of his death was the oldest surviving member of the famed 1932 World Championship Yankees team and recalled with great detail the now famous Babe Ruth's Called Shot.
- August 15 – Red Hardy, 80, pitcher for the 1951 New York Giants.
- August 21 – Ken Coleman, 78, sportscaster; Cleveland Indians' television play-by-play announcer from 1954 to 1963; radio or TV voice of the Boston Red Sox for 20 seasons between 1966 and 1989, initially replacing legendary Curt Gowdy; TV voice of the Cincinnati Reds, 1975–1978; also called NFL games for the Cleveland Browns during the Jim Brown era.
- August 21 – Maddy English, 79, three-time All-Star in the All-American Girls Professional Baseball League, while playing third base for the Racine Belles championship team in 1943 and 1946.
- August 22 – Julie Dusanko, 81, infielder who played for the Minneapolis Millerettes and Racine Belles of the All-American Girls Professional Baseball League.
- August 23 – Bobby Bonds, 57, three-time All-Star right fielder and three-time Gold Glove Award winner, who played for eight teams, most prominently with the San Francisco Giants, while recording five of the first ten instances of hitting 30 home runs and stealing 30 bases in a season, ending his career with 332 homers and 461 steals, being also part of one of the most prolific father-son duos in any sport, along with his son Barry.
- August 26 – James Keelty, 81, Baltimore real-estate developer who from 1953 to 1959 was a key member of the Orioles' ownership syndicate that returned MLB to his city in 1954.
- August 30 – Claude Passeau, 94, five-time All-Star pitcher for the Philadelphia Phillies and Chicago Cubs, who led the National League in strikeouts in 1939, and also pitched a one-hitter in Game 3 of the 1945 World Series.

=== September ===
- September 1 – Héctor Rodríguez, 83, Cuban infielder who had a long career in the Mexican League and Negro leagues prior to the integration of organized baseball, until finally becoming the regular third baseman for the Chicago White Sox in 1952 as a 32-year rookie.
- September 5 – Harley Grossman, 73, pitcher who played for the Washington Senators in its 1952 season.
- September 13 – Johnny Welaj, 89, outfielder who played for the Washington Senators and Philadelphia Athletics in part of four seasons spanning 1939–1943.
- September 14 – Allen Lewis, 86, sportswriter for The Philadelphia Inquirer for thirty years who also served twelve years as chairman of baseball's scoring rules committee.
- September 18 – Pauline Crawley, 79, outfielder who played in the All-American Girls Professional Baseball League.
- September 25 – Walt Dixon, 82, converted pitcher who became a feared batsman in lower minor leagues of the 1950s; longtime manager and scout in Chicago Cubs organization, and a member of the Cubs' "College of Coaches" in 1964 and 1965.
- September 25 – George Plimpton, 76, author whose forays into sports included pitching against the NL team prior to the second 1960 All-Star Game, who also wrote a fictitious story for Sports Illustrated in 1985 based on "Sidd Finch", a phenomenal pitching prospect.
- September 27 – Red Barbary, 83, pinch-hitter in one game for the 1943 Washington Senators.

=== October ===
- October 1 – Lillian DeCambra, 77, All-American Girls Professional Baseball League player.
- October 3 – Greg Biagini, 51, Baltimore Orioles' MLB hitting coach from 1992 to 1994; former minor league first baseman and manager.
- October 10 – Johnny Klippstein, 75, pitcher who had an 18-year career in the Major Leagues with eight teams, winning a World Series ring with the Los Angeles Dodgers in 1959 and leading the American League in saves while playing with the Cleveland Indians in 1960.
- October 12 – Joan B. Kroc, 75, owner of the San Diego Padres from 1984 to 1990 following the death of her husband, McDonald's founder Ray Kroc.
- October 14 – Wil Culmer, 45, Bahamian outfielder who played for the Cleveland Indians in its 1983 season.
- October 23 – Al Corwin, 76, pitcher who played for the New York Giants from 1951 through 1955, including the 1951 National League Champion Giants, and the squad that swept the highly favored Cleveland Indians in the 1954 World Series.
- October 30 – Lillian Jackson, 84, outfielder, one of the original founding members of the All-American Girls Professional Baseball League in its 1943 inaugural season.

=== November ===
- November 1 – Sonny Senerchia, 72, third baseman for the 1952 Pittsburgh Pirates; also an accomplished professional musician.
- November 5 – Dernell Stenson, 25, promising young outfielder who had played 37 games in 2003 with the Cincinnati Reds.
- November 6 – Spider Jorgensen, 84, third baseman who debuted with the Brooklyn Dodgers on the same day that teammate Jackie Robinson broke baseball's color barrier; played 267 games for Dodgers and New York Giants through 1951, then became a longtime scout.
- November 11 – Lloyd Pettit, 76, Chicago sportscaster who was a member of the Cubs' and White Sox' television announcing teams during the late 1960s.
- November 15 – Earl Battey, 68, All-Star catcher and three-time Gold Glove winner for the Chicago White Sox, Washington Senators and Minnesota Twins, appearing in 1,141 games between 1955 and 1967; batted a career-high .302 in 1961.
- November 17 – Pete Taylor, 75, pitcher who played for the St. Louis Browns in 1952.
- November 18 – Ken Brett, 55, well-traveled All-Star pitcher who played for ten teams between 1967 and 1981; at age 19 became the youngest hurler to appear in a World Series game as member of the 1967 "Impossible Dream" Red Sox; excellent hitting pitcher who batted .262 with ten home runs and 44 RBI in 347 career at bats; elder brother of Hall of Famer George Brett; member of California Angels' TV broadcast team for eight years.
- November 22 – Joe Just, 87, Cincinnati Reds catcher in the 1944 and 1945 seasons.
- November 24 – Warren Spahn, 82, Hall of Fame pitcher for the Boston/Milwaukee Braves (1942, 1946–1964), New York Mets (1965) and San Francisco Giants (1965), whose 363 career victories made him the fifth-winningest pitcher – and the winningest left-hander – in MLB history; compiled thirteen 20-win seasons, including Cy Young Award campaign in 1957 World Series championship season, 14 All-Star Game appearances and two no-hitters; led National League in wins eight times, in strikeouts, shutouts and innings four times each, and in ERA three times; his career 2,583 strikeouts were the record for left-handers until 1975, while his 5,244 innings pitched remained top mark among southpaws.
- November 29 – Jim Carlin, 85, outfielder who played with the Philadelphia Phillies in the 1941 season.
- November 29 – Jim Duffy, 83, American League umpire who officiated in 449 games from 1951 through 1953.
- November 30 – Jack Brewer, 85, pitcher who played from 1944 to 1946 for the New York Giants.

=== December ===
- December 1 – Barbara Galdonik, 69, All-American Girls Professional Baseball League player.
- December 3 – Jay Difani, 80, second baseman for the Washington Senators in the 1948 and 1949 seasons.
- December 5 – Paul Busby, 85, outfielder who played for the Philadelphia Phillies in 1941 and 1943.
- December 10 – Don Wheeler, 81, catcher who played for the Chicago White Sox in its 1949 season.
- December 12 – Earl Gillespie, 81, radio voice of the Milwaukee Braves from 1953 through 1963.
- December 15 – Garvin Hamner, 79, middle infielder for the 1945 Philadelphia Phillies; brother of Granny Hamner.
- December 19 – Carmen Mauro, 77, outfielder who played for the Chicago Cubs, Brooklyn Dodgers, Washington Senators and Philadelphia Athletics in part of four seasons spanning 1948–1953.
- December 23 – Charlie Bowles, 86, pitcher who played for the Philadelphia Athletics in the 1943 and 1945 seasons.
- December 26 – Paul Owens, 79, general manager of the Philadelphia Phillies from June 1972 through 1984 and architect of the team's 1980 World Series champions; also field manager of Phils (July 10, 1972 to end of season, then July 18, 1983 through end of 1984), leading them to 1983 National League pennant during his later term.
- December 27 – Iván Calderón, 41, Puerto Rican All-Star outfielder for four teams, who had three multi-home run games with the 1987 Chicago White Sox and batted .300 for the 1991 Montreal Expos.
- December 31 – Max West, 87, All-Star outfielder (1940) who played for the Boston Bees and Braves, Cincinnati Reds and Pittsburgh Pirates in a span of seven seasons from 1938 to 1948; batted .254 lifetime in 824 career games.
