= Cam Martin =

American basketball player (born 1998)

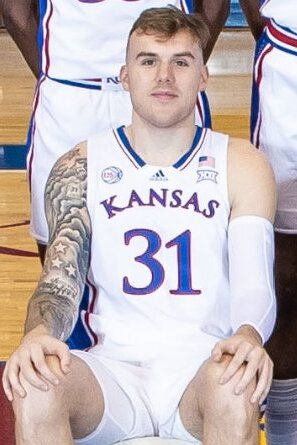
- Martin in 2022

No. 77 – Iowa Wolves
- Position: Power forward
- League: NBA G League

Personal information
- Born: March 24, 1998 (age 28) Pampa, Texas, U.S.
- Listed height: 6 ft 9 in (2.06 m)
- Listed weight: 230 lb (104 kg)

Career information
- High school: Norman North (Norman, Oklahoma); Yukon (Yukon, Oklahoma)
- College: Jacksonville State (2017–2018); Missouri Southern (2018–2021); Kansas (2022–2023); Boise State (2023–2024)
- NBA draft: 2024: undrafted
- Playing career: 2024–present

Career history
- 2024–2025: Motor City Cruise
- 2025–2026: Wisconsin Herd
- 2026–present: Iowa Wolves

Career highlights
- 3× First-team All-MIAA (2019–2021)

Cameron Martin (born March 24, 1998) is an American professional basketball player for the Iowa Wolves of the NBA G League. He played college basketball for the Jacksonville State Gamecocks, Missouri Southern Lions, Kansas Jayhawks and the Boise State Broncos. Martin is known for his extended seven-year college career in which he utilized his extra year of COVID eligibility, a redshirt season as a fifth-year senior, and an additional medical redshirt season granted by the NCAA.

== High school career ==
Martin initially attended Norman North at Norman, Oklahoma, leading them to a state runner-up title during his junior year while averaging 25 points and 13 rebounds. Afterwards, he transferred to Yukon High School at Yukon, Oklahoma and as a senior, he averaged 18 points and 13 rebounds, helping the team to the OSSAA state finals.

== College career ==
Martin began his college career at Jacksonville State, where he played in 28 games, averaging 4.1 points and 2.6 rebounds in 9.8 minutes.

Martin later transferred to Missouri Southern where he appeared in 86 games and averaged 23.7 points, 9.3 rebounds, 2.1 assists and 1.2 blocks while shooting 38.8% from beyond the arc and 58.9% from the field while being a three-time Division II All-American as well as a 3-time All-MIAA performer. Due to the impact of the COVID-19 pandemic during his time at Missouri Southern, Martin gained a fifth year of NCAA eligibility.

Martin transferred up to Division I Kansas in 2021 as a super senior grad transfer, but in November decided to redshirt due to lack of available playing time behind David McCormack and other big men on the roster. Martin earned a national championship ring as a member of the 2021–22 Kansas Jayhawks men's basketball team, winners of the 2022 NCAA Division I men's basketball championship game. Martin separated his shoulder in practice prior to the 2022 season. At Kansas he played four games.

After two season at Kansas, in 2023 Martin entered the transfer portal and enrolled at Boise State for his final, seventh year of NCAA eligibility. Due to his extended eligibility Cam was able to play with his younger brother, Alex Martin, a walk-on guard for the Broncos. At Boise State he appeared in 32 games, averaging 5.3 points, 4.4 rebounds and 2.4 assists.

== Professional career ==
After going undrafted in the 2024 NBA draft, Martin joined the Motor City Cruise.

== Personal life ==
The son of Jeff and Mandi Martin, he earned a degree in kinesiology.
