= Steve Heller =

Steve, Steven or Stephen Heller may refer to:

- Steve Heller (fiction), American author of The Automotive History of Lucky Kellerman
- Steven Heller (composer-producer), American producer-composer who has won two Grammy Awards
- Steven Heller (design writer) (born 1950), American art director, journalist, critic, author, and editor on graphic design
- Stephen Heller (1813–1888), Hungarian pianist and composer
- Stephen Heller (whistleblower), whistleblower on illegal and uncertified Californian voting machines at Diebold Election Systems
