= Yukon High School =

Coordinates: 35°29′55″N 97°45′33″W

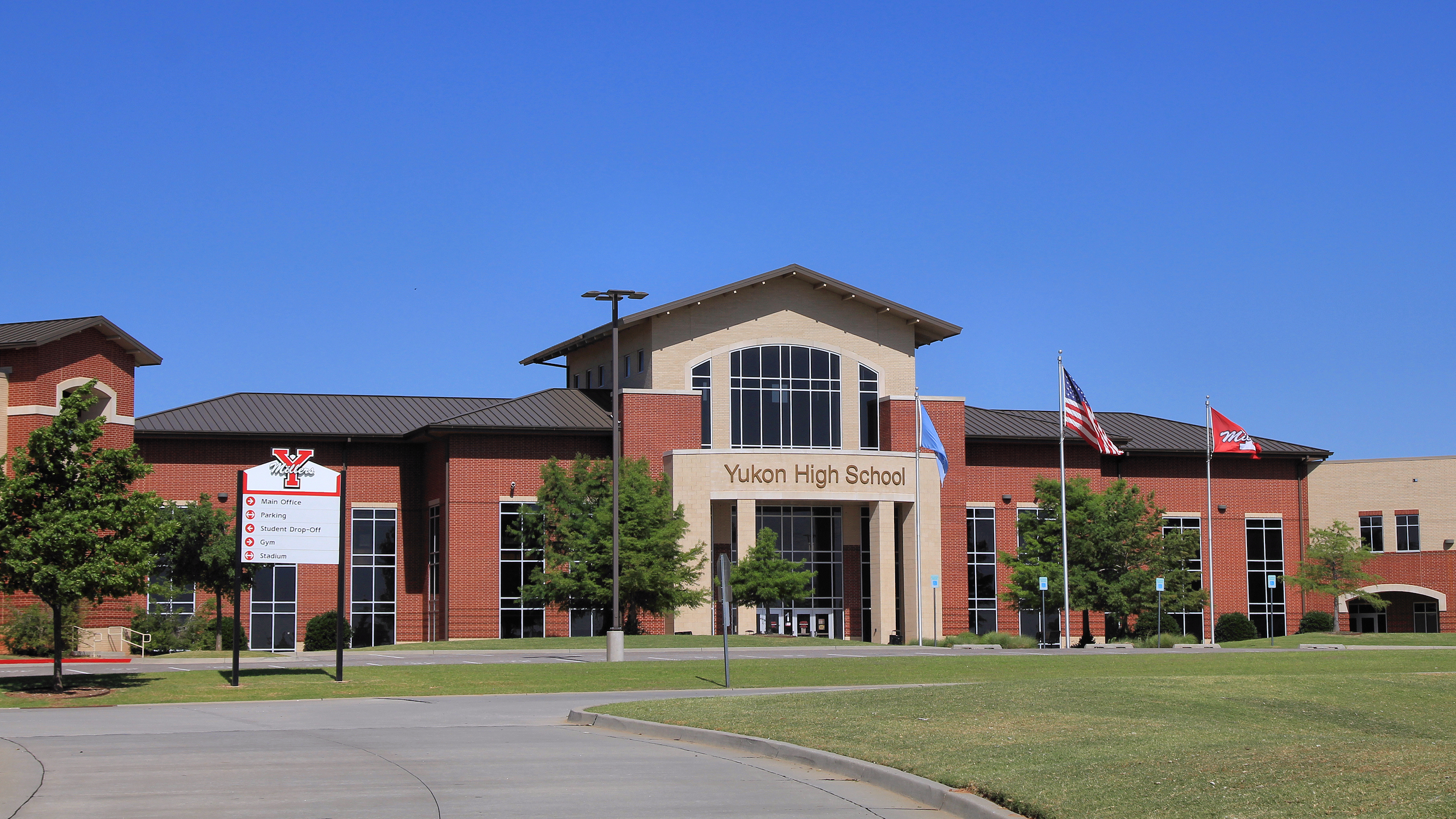

Location
- 1777 S. Yukon Parkway; Canadian County; Yukon, Oklahoma 73099; United States

Information
- Type: Co-educational, public, secondary
- Established: 1891
- School district: Yukon Public Schools
- NCES District ID: 4033480
- Authority: OSDE
- CEEB code: 374020
- NCES School ID: 403348001849
- Principal: Melissa Barlow
- Teaching staff: 140.75 (FTE)
- Grades: 9–12
- Enrollment: 2,914 (2023-2024)
- Student to teacher ratio: 20.70
- Colors: Red and white
- Athletics conference: OSSAA Class 6A District 1
- Sports: Baseball, basketball, cheer, cross country, football, golf, pom, rugby, soccer, softball, tennis, track, wrestling
- Mascot: The Millerman
- Rivals: Mustang High School "Broncos"
- USNWR ranking: 7,849
- Newspaper: The Insight
- Yearbook: The Miller
- Website: yhs.yukonschools.org/o/yukonhs

Yukon High School is a secondary school located within Canadian County in Yukon, Oklahoma, United States.

== Clubs and organizations ==
Yukon has won state titles in softball (1986, 1991, 1997, 2000, 2010), boys' basketball (1974, 1979), baseball (1982, 1996, 1997), boys' bowling (2012, 2014), cheerleading (2002), and pom (2004, 2012, 2014, 2018, 2019, 2020).

== Notable alumni ==
- Phil Ball (1943), college football coach
- Carson Benge (2021), MLB outfielder
- Garth Brooks (1980), Grammy award winning country singer
- Cam Martin (2017), NBA G League basketball player
- Vernon Turner (2017), Olympic high jumper
