= Anna Meyer =

- Shortstop
- Born: November 17, 1928 (age 97); Aurora, Indiana, U.S.
- Bats: Right Throws: Right

Teams
- Kenosha Comets (1944); Minneapolis Millerettes (1944)

Anna L. "Pee Wee" Meyer (later Petrovic; born November 17, 1928) is a former shortstop who played in the All-American Girls Professional Baseball League (AAGPBL) during the 1944 season. Born in Aurora, Indiana, she was one of the youngest players to sign a contract with the league at age 15.

== Career ==
In 1942, chewing gum magnate and Chicago Cubs owner Philip K. Wrigley decided to start a women's pro softball league, concerned that the 1943 major-league season might be canceled because of World War II. Play in 1943 was a hybrid of softball and baseball, and the circuit initially called the All-American Girls Softball League, though early in the first season the name was changed to All American Girls Baseball League.

Meyer was one of the youngest players to sign a contract with the newly founded All-American Girls Professional Baseball League at age 15. She batted and threw right-handed and was invited to a tryout in the 1944 spring training and immediately was assigned to the Kenosha Comets. Meyer earned the promotion only after her father lied about her age: The league minimum was 16, as she was eight months short of becoming eligible.

During the 1944 mid-season, she was traded by Kenosha to the Minneapolis Millerettes in the same transaction that brought Elizabeth Mahon to the Comets. Meyer hit a combined .192 batting average in 142 games. Considering the league was using underhand pitching and a softball with a twelve-inch diameter, her average was acceptable for a middle infielder, especially with sharp defensive skills. In fact, All-Star outfielder Betsy Jochum clinched the batting title that year with a .296 mark.

At the end of the season, Meyer moved to a rival Chicago-based National Girls Baseball League to get more playing time and nearly as much money. She played for the Chicago Bluebirds for five years, and enjoyed being on the new team more because it required less travel and she also could hold down a job.

== Personal life ==
In 1950, she married photographer George Petrovic. They raised two sons, David and George Jr.. As of 2008, she was living in Tucson, Arizona. The National Baseball Hall of Fame and Museum recognized the AAGPBL with a permanent Women in Baseball exhibit in 1988.

== Statistics ==
=== Batting ===
GP	AB	R	H	2B	3B	HR	RBI	SB	BB	SO	BA	OBP
141	365	38	79	8	2	1	11	33	50	43	.192	.311

=== Fielding ===
PO	A	E	DP	TC	FA
346	63	17	11	426	.953
