= Elizabeth Farrow =

American baseball player

- Pitcher
- Born: August 10, 1926; Peoria, Illinois, U.S.
- Died: March 9, 2010 (aged 83); Metamora, Illinois, U.S.
- Batted: Right Threw: Right

Teams
- Minneapolis Millerettes (1944); Rockford Peaches (1944)

Career highlights and awards
- Women in Baseball – AAGPBL Permanent Display at Baseball Hall of Fame and Museum (since 1988)

Mary Elizabeth Farrow (later Rapp; August 10, 1926 – March 9, 2010) was a pitcher who played in the All-American Girls Professional Baseball League (AAGPBL). Listed at 5' 7", 130 lb., she batted and threw right handed.

Born in Peoria, Illinois, Farrow was a below average pitcher in her only season in the league. She joined the Minneapolis Millerettes in its 1944 season and then was traded to the Rockford Peaches during the midseason.

In 19 pitching appearances, Farrow posted a 1–12 record with a 5.64 ERA, allowing 72 hits and 85 walks, while striking out only 16 batters in 99.0 innings of work. Afterwards, Farrow returned to Peoria and married Gerald Rapp in 1945 and raised two sons together, Jerry and Bob. During her leisure time, she enjoyed bowling and followed Chicago Cubs games. Farrow was a long time resident of Metamora, Illinois, where she died in 2010 at the age of 83.

The All-American Girls Professional Baseball League folded in 1954, but there is now a permanent display at the Baseball Hall of Fame and Museum at Cooperstown, New York since November 5, 1988 that honors those who were part of this unique experience. Elizabeth, along with the rest of the league's girls and staff, is included at the display/exhibit.
