= Loretta Dwojak =

American baseball player (born 1925)

- Third base / Right field
- Born: December 19, 1925; Chicago, Illinois, U.S.
- Bats: Right Throws: Right

Teams
- Minneapolis Millerettes (1944); South Bend Blue Sox (1944)

Career highlights and awards
- Women in Baseball – AAGPBL Permanent Display at Baseball Hall of Fame and Museum (1988)

Loretta Dwojak (born December 19, 1925) was an infielder and outfielder who played in the All-American Girls Professional Baseball League (AAGPBL). Listed at 5' 5", 135 lb., she batted and threw right handed.

Born in Chicago, Illinois, Loretta Dwojak played with two teams during the 1944 season.

A classic line drive hitter, Dwojak was also a skillful bunter and a fast and smart runner. She started the season with the Minneapolis Millerettes, playing mainly at third base, but also appeared at shortstop and was often used in pinch-running duties.

Traded to the South Bend Blue Sox during the midseason, she eventually replaced Rose Gacioch at right field when Gacioch was pitching. She posted a combined .201 batting average with 18 stolen bases in 63 games.

She was not located after leaving the league in 1944.

Dwojak received further recognition when she became part of Women in Baseball, a permanent display based at the Baseball Hall of Fame and Museum in Cooperstown, New York, which was unveiled in 1988 to honor the entire All-American Girls Professional Baseball League.

== Career statistics ==
Batting

GP	AB	R	H	2B	3B	HR	RBI	SB	TB	BB	SO	BA	OBP	SLG
76	174	21	35	4	2	0	19	29	43	18	17	.201	.276	.247

Fielding

GP	PO	A	E	TC	DP	FA
39	52	24	7	83	10	.916
