= Yukon Public Schools =

School district in Oklahoma

Coordinates: 35.505768°N 97.752207°W

Location
- 600 Maple Drive; Yukon, Oklahoma 73099 Canadian County United States of America

District information
- Type: Public, Primary, Secondary, Co-Educational
- Grades: Elementary Pre-K-3; Intermediate 4-6; Middle School 7-8; High School 9-12
- Established: 1891
- Superintendent: Keith Sinor
- Schools: 14

Students and staff
- Students: 8,800
- Teachers: 550
- Student–teacher ratio: 32:1
- Athletic conference: 6A

Other information
- Website: www.yukonschools.org

Yukon Public Schools is a public school district located in the city of Yukon, in Canadian County, Oklahoma.

Located in Canadian County, the district includes most of Yukon and sections of Oklahoma City.

== Geography and demographics ==
The district includes 10 schools, serves a community of 36,938 people, and encompasses 68.28 square miles. The district offers pre-school through secondary school education. The school served 7,209 students in the 2009–2010 school year.

== Schools ==
=== Elementary schools ===
- Central Elementary (PK-3)
- Myers Elementary (PK-3)
- Parkland Elementary (PK-3)
- Ranchwood Elementary (PK-3)
- Shedeck Elementary (PK-3)
- Skyview Elementary (PK-3)
- Surrey Hills Elementary (PK-3)

=== Intermediate schools ===
- Independence Intermediate (4-6)
- Lakeview Intermediate (4-6)
- Redstone Intermediate (4-6)

=== Middle school ===
- Yukon Middle School (7-8)

=== High school ===
- Yukon High School (9-12)

=== Alternative and Virtual programs ===
- Yukon Alternative Learning Experience
- Yukon Virtual School
- BRIDGES of Yukon

== History ==
In 1891, Yukon's first school opened in a one-room school building.

== Sources ==
4. BRIDGES Program Locations of Operation
