= Czech Hall =

- U.S. National Register of Historic Places
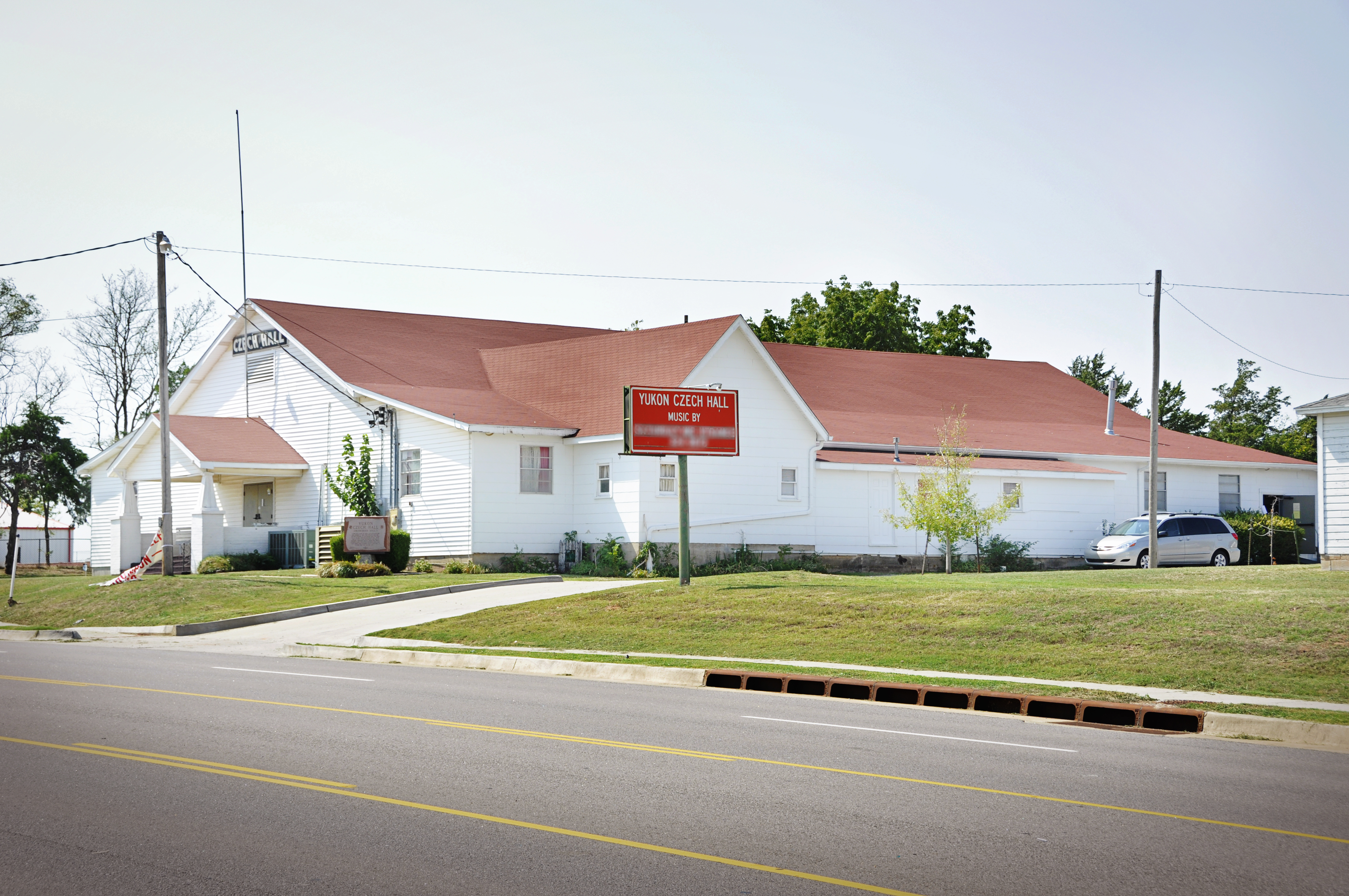

- Location within Oklahoma Location within the United States
- Nearest city: Yukon, Oklahoma
- Coordinates: 35°28′7″N 97°44′33″W
- Area: 2 acres (0.81 ha)
- Built: 1925
- Architect: Morava, George
- NRHP reference No.: 80003258
- Added to NRHP: November 25, 1980

Yukon, Oklahoma's original Czech Hall was built in 1899 by early Czech settlers who were members of Sokol Karel Havliček Lodge and ZCBJ Lodge Jan Žižka No. 67. That building was rebuilt using the materials from the original building in order to have a larger building in 1925. That structure is standing today. It was originally known as the Bohemian Hall, with its name later changed to Yukon Czech Hall.

The Hall (as so many commonly refer to it) was and continues to be the focal point of Czech social and musical functions in Oklahoma. It was, and is, the site of traditional weddings, reunions, and family gatherings. Until 1940, it was also a performance site for Czech plays. The Hall has a museum in one part of the building preserving the history of the Hall, the Czech heritage and arts, and the surrounding community and its Czech-American people.

It is best known for its Saturday night Czech dances which have taken place every Saturday night since 1925. Dances are open to the public and to both Czechs and non-Czechs of all ages. The majority of music at the Saturday night dances is Czech polkas, waltzes, and group folk dances. The dances are easy to learn and someone is always ready to help teach a newcomer. The Hall is still operated today by the voluntary efforts of its members (members of Sokol Lodge and Better Life, which is the current name of the former ZCBJ association). The members of Yukon Czech Hall started the Oklahoma Czech Festival and the evening events of the Festival are held at The Hall on the first Saturday of each October.

The building is a National and State historic site, having been listed on the National Register of Historic Places in 1980.

It is located at 205 N. Czech Hall Road, which is approximately a half mile south of I-40.

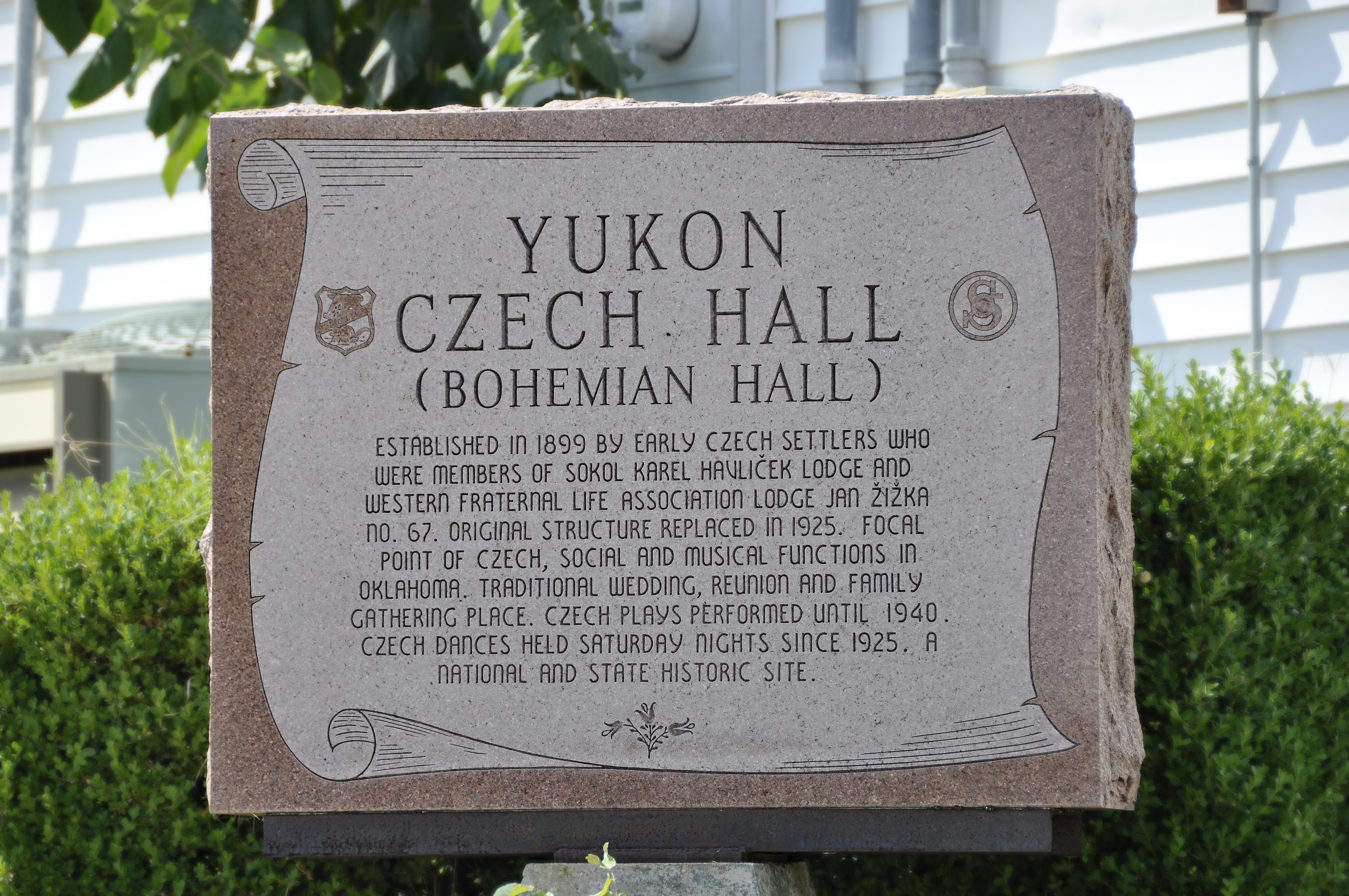
The monument outside of Czech Hall

== See also ==
- ZCBJ Lodge No. 46
