= Edna Dummerth =

American baseball player

Edna Frank Dummerth
- Born: June 15, 1924; St. Louis, Missouri, U.S.
- Died: October 8, 2017 (aged 93); St. Louis, Missouri, U.S.
- Batted: Right Threw: Right

Teams
- Minneapolis Millerettes (1944); Racine Belles (1944)

Edna Dummerth (née Frank; June 15, 1924 – October 8, 2017) played in the All-American Girls Professional Baseball League (AAGPBL) in 1944. She was born in St. Louis, Missouri and known by her nickname "Frankie".

Dummerth got into the game during her high school years where she earned a reputation for being a good catcher. Thereafter, when she was 20 she started playing for the Minneapolis Millerettes and then, in the same year, for the Racine Belles. She both threw and batted right-handed. After playing just 16 games, she left the League and joined the United States Navy. After leaving the navy she married Robert A. Dummerth and had eight children.

In 1989 Dummerth was honored by the St. Louis Cardinals.

Dummerth died on October 8, 2017.

== Career statistics ==
Batting

| GP | AB | R | H | 2B | 3B | HR | RBI | SB | TB | BB | SO | BA | OBP | SLG | OPS |
|---|---|---|---|---|---|---|---|---|---|---|---|---|---|---|---|
| 16 | 46 | 1 | 5 | 0 | 0 | 0 | 2 | 1 | 5 | 1 | 4 | .109 | .128 | .109 | .236 |

Fielding

| GP | PO | A | E | TC | DP | FA |
|---|---|---|---|---|---|---|
| 15 | 53 | 10 | 6 | 69 | 2 | .913 |
