= Lorraine Borg =

American baseball player

- Catcher
- Born: July 18, 1923; Minneapolis, Minnesota, U.S.
- Died: April 16, 2006 (aged 82); Baxter, Minnesota, U.S.
- Batted: Right Threw: Right

Teams
- Minneapolis Millerettes (1944)

Career highlights and awards
- Women in Baseball – AAGPBL Permanent Display at Baseball Hall of Fame and Museum (1988)

Lorraine Borg (July 18, 1923 – April 16, 2006) was a catcher who played in the All-American Girls Professional Baseball League (AAGPBL). Listed at 5' 9", 145 lb., she batted and threw right-handed.

Born in Minneapolis, Minnesota, Lorraine Borg attended Southwest High School in Minneapolis and played sports in the local city league since the school had none for female athletes. She had her first contact with baseball at age nine while serving as a batgirl for a team. She began playing organized softball at thirteen and two years later was promoted to the top park league. Though she started playing at outfield, she switched to catching and made a lasting impression.

In 1944, she attended an AAGPBL tryout in Minneapolis and made the final cut. After that, she was invited to the spring training camp at Peru, Illinois, and was assigned to her hometown team, the Minneapolis Millerettes, where she was managed by former big leaguer Bubber Jonnard and split the catching duties with Ruth Lessing.

″Borge″, as her teammates dubbed her, enjoyed the league at first while meeting new people and ballplayers, although she did not like the long rides for road trips. She became homesick and felt tired and stressed, more so than she would ever expected to have dealt with. Just after the second trip, she left the club and never returned to the league. Her softball league did not exclude her because she had turned professional, and she was able to play locally and later coached for a few years.

Borg married Eric Erickson in 1946 and they fostered two children. After being widowed, she remarried to Lou Aplin in 1954. The couple had three children. She then managed a restaurant and raised her five children. Widowed for a second time in 1989, she moved to Baxter, Minnesota, while enjoying her nine grandchildren and traveling more frequently.

In 1988, Borg received further recognition when she became part of Women in Baseball, a permanent display based at the Baseball Hall of Fame and Museum in Cooperstown, New York, which was unveiled to honor the entire All-American Girls Professional Baseball League.

== Career statistics ==
Batting

GP	AB	R	H	2B	3B	HR	RBI	SB	TB	BB	SO	BA	OBP	SLG
23	83	7	11	0	0	0	2	2	11	7	5	.133	.200	.133

Fielding

GP	PO	A	E	TC	DP	FA
23	157	12	10	179	1	.944
