= 2003 Big League World Series =

Tournament details
- Country: United States
- City: Easley, South Carolina
- Dates: 2–9 August 2003
- Teams: 10

Final positions
- Champions: Easley, South Carolina
- Runner-up: Thousand Oaks, California

The 2003 Big League World Series took place from August 2–9 in Easley, South Carolina, United States. Host Easley, South Carolina defeated Thousand Oaks, California in the championship game.

== Teams ==
United States	International
(South Carolina) Easley, South Carolina; District 1 Host	(Guam) Yona, Guam; Southern Guam; Asia–Pacific
(Illinois) Burbank, Illinois; District 15; Central	(British Columbia) Fraser Valley, British Columbia; Fraser Valley; Canada
(Pennsylvania) Williamsport, Pennsylvania; District 12; East	(South Africa) South Africa; District 1 Europe
(Florida) Dunedin, Florida; District 12; Southeast	(Mexico) Guadalupe, Mexico; Linda Vista; Latin America
(Texas) Brenham, Texas; Washington County; Southwest	
(California) Thousand Oaks, California; Thousand Oaks; West

== Results ==
Group A

Team	W	L	Rs	Ra
South Carolina	4	0	36	5
Florida	3	1	29	8
Illinois	2	2	26	17
South Africa	1	3	13	36
Guam	0	4	5	43

	(Florida)	(Guam)	(Illinois)	(South Africa)	(South Carolina)
Florida	–	13–0	2–1	14–4	0–3
Guam	0–13	–	1–14	4–5	0–11
Illinois	1–2	14–1	–	7–3	4–11
South Africa	4–14	5–4	3–7	–	1–11
South Carolina	3–0	11–0	11–4	11–1	–

Group B

Team	W	L	Rs	Ra
California	4	0	35	20
Texas	3	1	38	29
Mexico	2	2	26	21
Canada	1	3	12	28
Pennsylvania	0	4	13	27

	(California)	(Canada)	(Mexico)	(Pennsylvania)	(Texas)
California	–	11–3	8–6	6–3	10–8
Canada	3–11	–	1–5	2–1	6–10
Mexico	6–8	5–1	–	9–2	6–10
Pennsylvania	3–6	1–2	2–9	–	7–10
Texas	8–10	10–6	10–6	10–7	–

Elimination Round

Semifinals
4–0	South Carolina	18
3–1	Texas	0
4–0	California	13
3–1	Florida	5

World Championship
5–0	South Carolina	6
5–0	California	3

2003 Big League World Series Champions
District 1
Easley, South Carolina
