= Minneapolis Millerettes =

- (1944); Minneapolis, Minnesota
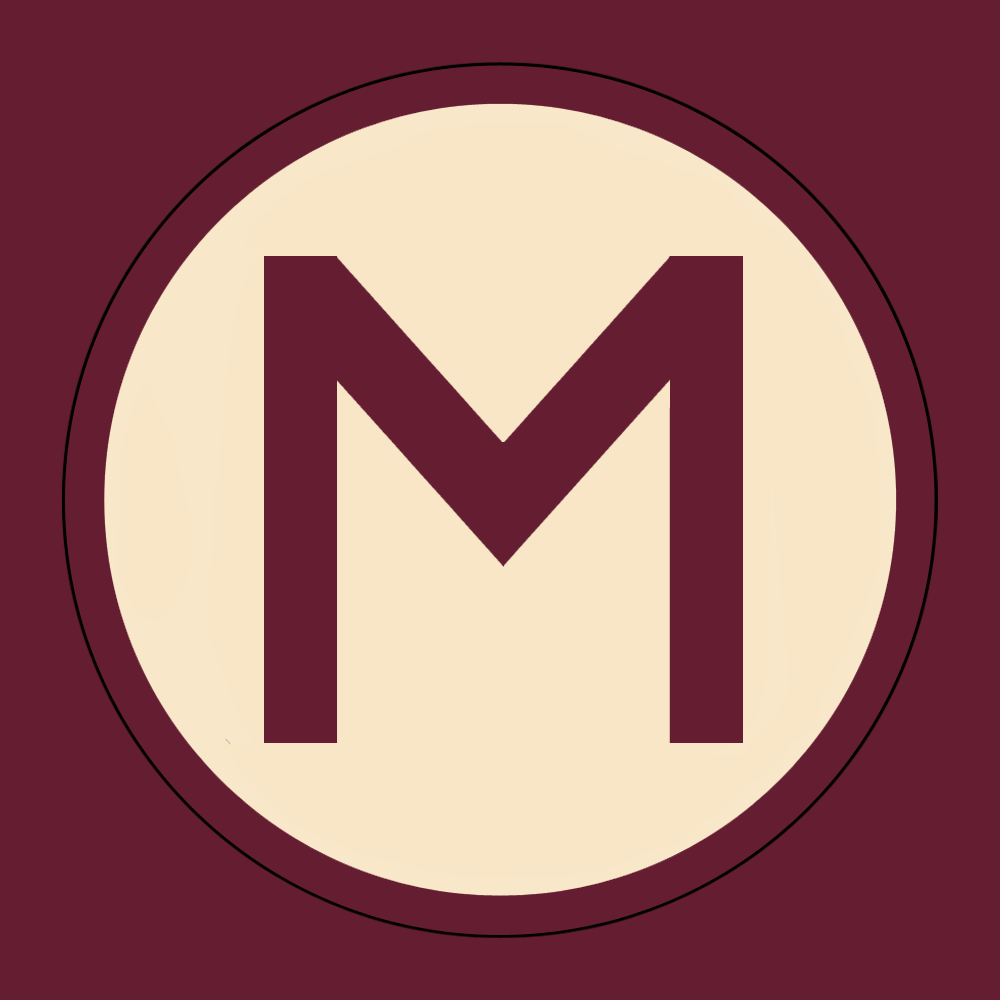

Minor league affiliations
- Previous leagues: All-American Girls Professional Baseball League

Team data
- Name: Lakers, Orphans
- Colors: Maroon, pink, white
- Previous parks: Nicollet Park
- Owner/ Operator: AAGPBL

The Minneapolis Millerettes were an expansion All-American Girls Professional Baseball League team that played for one season in 1944 based in Minneapolis, Minnesota. The Millerettes played home games at Nicollet Park, home of the men's minor league baseball team the Minneapolis Millers.

== History ==
The Millerettes were part of the expansion of professional women's baseball during World War II, as over 1,000 professional male ballplayers were recruited into service. The cities that were selected to have teams were chosen due to their important wartime manufacturing production, and baseball was meant to provide entertainment. Originally, fourteams made up the All-American Girls Professional Baseball League, and the Millerettes were added along with the Milwaukee Chicks two years after the league began.

Like their expansion counterparts the Milwaukee Chicks, the team did not have an official nickname. They were alternately known as "Millerettes", after the city's American Association ballclub, and "Lakers" from Minnesota's nickname, "Land of 10,000 Lakes". That nickname would be adopted by the city's professional basketball team three years later.

The Millerettes played their first game on May 27, 1944, against the Rockford Peaches. They had been honored the day before at a luncheon of the Minneapolis Aquatennial Association. During the opener, they blew a 3-0 lead to lose 5-4.

Halfway through the season, the league gave up on the Minneapolis market, which also featured a semi-pro men's baseball team in the Northern League. Many other teams complained of the travel distance to Nicollete Park, and their nearest competitors were 400 miles away. The Millerettes became a traveling team playing all games on the road, earning another nickname, the "Orphans".

The Millerettes' uniform consisted of a maroon cap and socks and a pink dress uniform with the circular Minneapolis city seal at the center of the chest.

The team was managed by Claude "Bubber" Jonnard, although the manager has often been incorrectly identified as Claude's brother Clarence Bubber Jonnard. Claude was a pitcher for the New York Giants in the 1920s.

The most significant players were pitcher Dorothy Wiltse, who posted a 20–16 record and a 1.88 ERA in 38 appearances, and outfielder Helen Callaghan, who finished second in the league in average (.287) and third in runs (81), hits (114), home runs (3), and total bases (136). Pitcher Annabelle Lee threw the first perfect game in AAGPBL history on July 29, 1944, against the Kenosha Comets. Two players were from Minneapolis: Lorraine Borg and Peggy Torrison.

In 1945, the Millerettes moved to Fort Wayne, Indiana, where they became the Fort Wayne Daisies.

In 1987, Helen Callaghan's son Kelly Candaele and friend Kim Wilson helped to produce the documentary film A League of Their Own, which then inspired the feature film of the same name.

== All-time players roster ==
1944 Minneapolis Millerettes Back, L-R: Bubber Jonnard (Manager), Dorothy Wiltse (P), Vivian Kellogg (1B), Audrey Haine (P), Lavonne Paire (C), Kay Blumetta (P/1B), Lillian Jackson (OF), Ada Ryan (Chaperone). Middle, L-R: Faye Dancer (OF), Elizabeth Farrow (P), Margaret Callaghan (3B), Audrey Kissel (2B), Margaret Wigiser (OF). Front, L-R: Ruth Lessing (C), Annabelle Lee (P), Helen Callaghan (OF), Betty Trezza (IF/OF).

- Kay Blumetta
- Lorraine Borg
- Helen Callaghan
- Margaret Callaghan
- Faye Dancer
- Julie Dusanko
- Loretta Dwojak
- Elizabeth Farrow
- Edna Frank
- Audrey Haine
- Lillian Jackson
- Marguerite Jones
- Vivian Kellogg
- Audrey Kissel
- Annabelle Lee
- Ruth Lessing
- Elizabeth Mahon
- Anna Meyer
- Lavonne Paire
- Irene Ruhnke
- Lorraine Torrison
- Betty Trezza
- Margaret Wigiser
- Dorothy Wiltse
