= Jim Duffy (umpire) =

American baseball umpire and basketball referee

- Born: James Francis Duffy; August 9, 1920; Pawtucket, Rhode Island, U.S.
- Died: November 29, 2003 (aged 83); Newport, Rhode Island, U.S.
- Occupation: Umpire
- Years active: 1951–1953
- Employer: American League

James Francis Duffy (August 9, 1920 – November 29, 2003) was an American professional baseball umpire and a professional basketball referee. He worked in the American League from 1951 to 1953. Duffy umpired 448 major league games in his three-year career.

In 1954, Duffy was sent from Major League Baseball to the International League. He retired from baseball in early 1955, when he found out that he would not be brought back up to the major league level. Upon his retirement, Duffy publicly asserted that his demotion had resulted simply from pressure applied to league president Will Harridge by officials from the Red Sox and White Sox. Harridge responded that those allegations were "utterly ridiculous and completely untrue." Harridge said that Duffy "did not measure up to the standards of the American League."

Duffy also spent several seasons as an NBA referee. He worked as an auto salesman in the offseason.
