= Carson Benge =

American baseball player (born 2003)

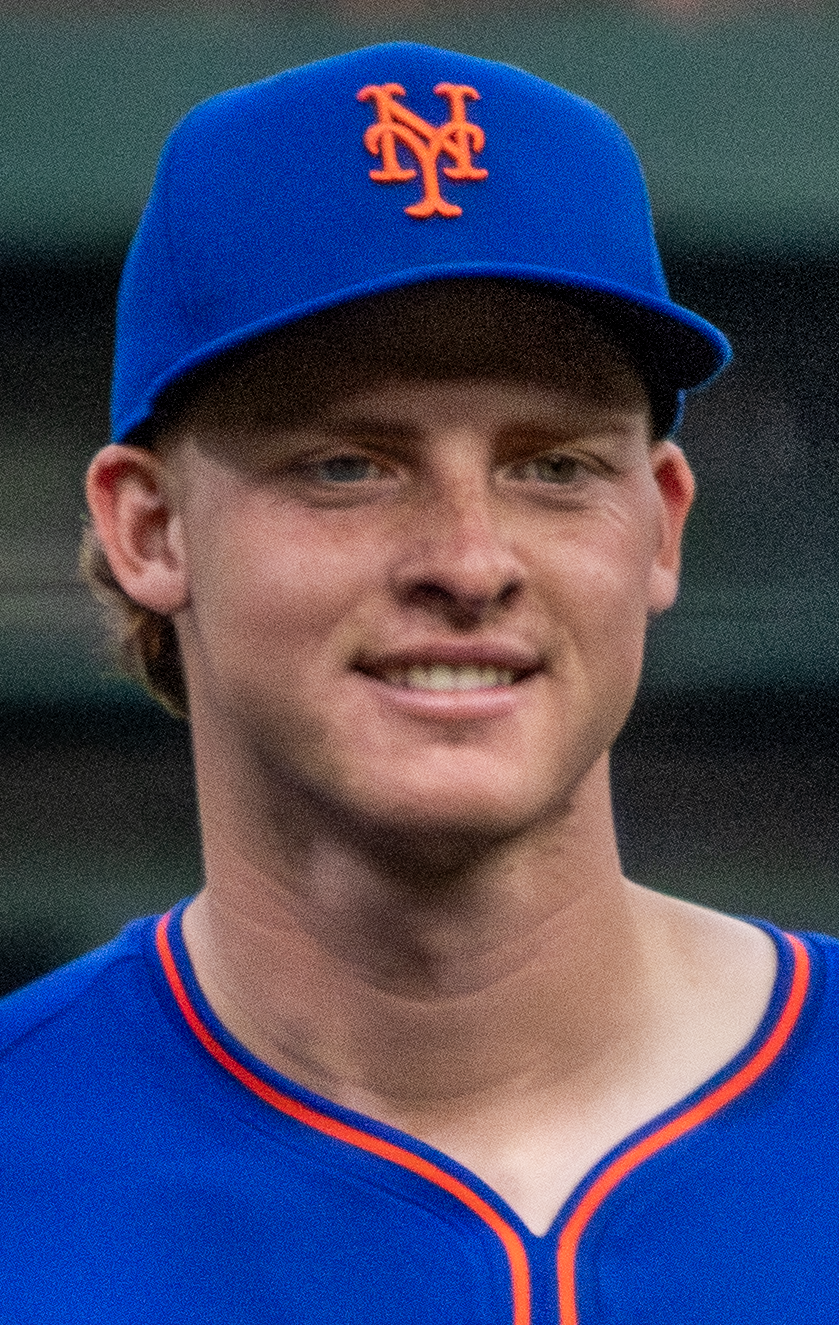
- Benge with the Mets in 2026

New York Mets – No. 3
- Outfielder
- Born: January 20, 2003 (age 23); Oklahoma City, Oklahoma, U.S.
- Bats: Left Throws: Right

MLB debut
- March 26, 2026, for the New York Mets

MLB statistics (through 2026 season)
- Batting average: .282
- Home runs: 20
- Runs batted in: 65
- Stats at Baseball Reference

Teams
- New York Mets (2026–present)

Carson Grant Benge (/bɛndʒ/ BENJ; born January 20, 2003) is an American professional baseball outfielder for the New York Mets of Major League Baseball (MLB). He played college baseball as an outfielder and pitcher for the Oklahoma State Cowboys. He was selected by the Mets in the first round of the 2024 MLB draft and made his MLB debut in 2026.

== Amateur career ==
Benge attended Yukon High School in Yukon, Oklahoma, where he played baseball. He committed to play college baseball at Oklahoma State University prior to his senior year. As a senior in 2021, Benge pitched to an 8–1 record with 124 strikeouts alongside batting .490. He went unselected in the 2021 Major League Baseball draft and enrolled at Oklahoma State.

Benge redshirted and did not appear in a game in 2022 after undergoing Tommy John surgery. He made his collegiate debut in 2023, pitching to a 6.69 ERA over 35 innings and appearing in 59 games primarily in right field. He batted .345 with seven home runs and 43 RBIs. That summer, he briefly played for the Chatham Anglers of the Cape Cod Baseball League. Benge entered the 2024 season as a top prospect for the upcoming draft. Over 61 games, he hit .335 with 18 home runs and 64 RBIs alongside posting a 3.16 ERA over 37 innings.

== Professional career ==
=== Minor leagues ===
The New York Mets selected Benge in the first round with the 19th overall pick of the 2024 Major League Baseball draft. He signed with the Mets on July 23 for $4 million, and confirmed that he would focus solely on playing outfield as opposed to continuing to be a two-way player.

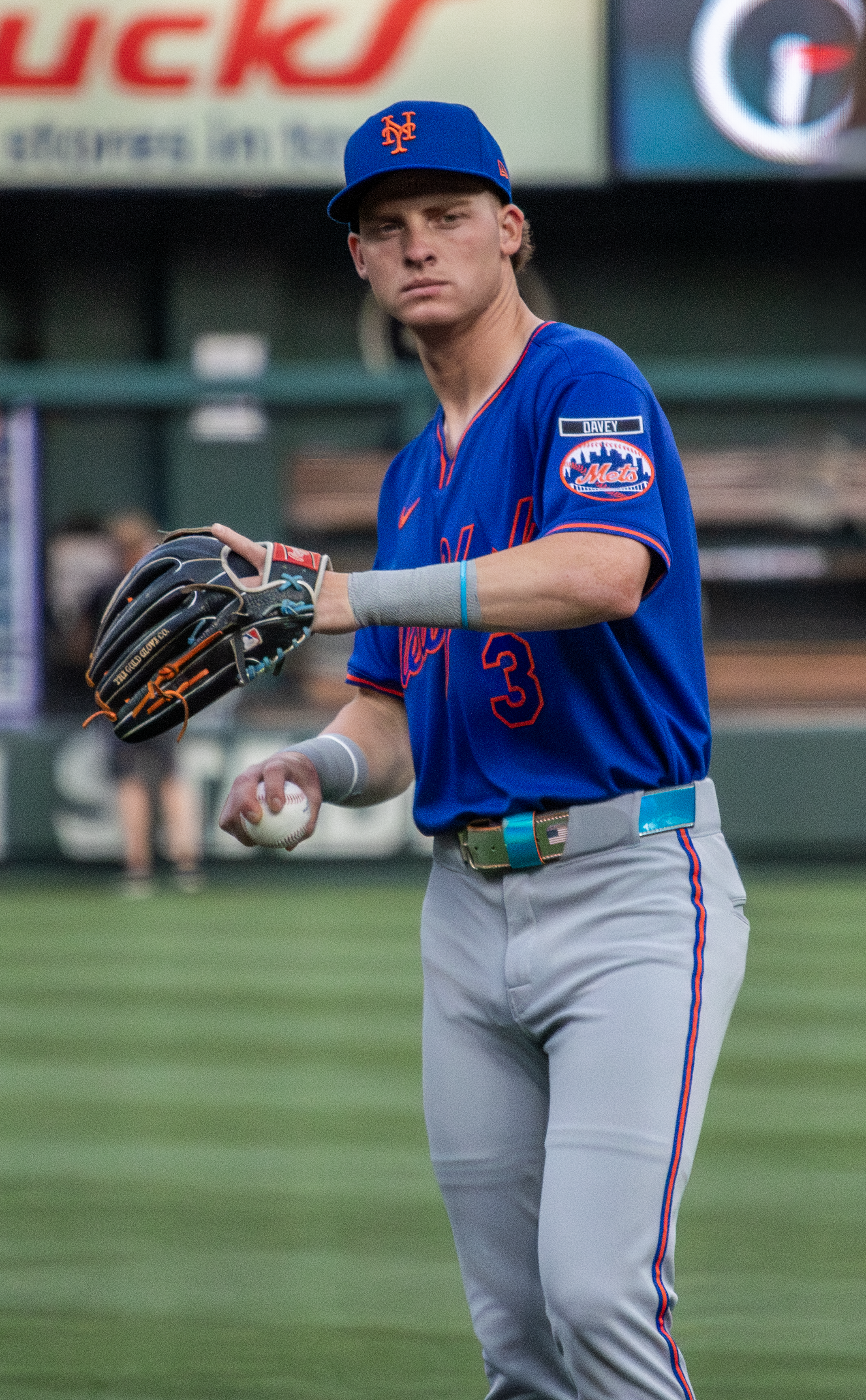
Benge with the Mets in 2026

After signing, Benge made his professional debut with the Single-A St. Lucie Mets, hitting .273 with two home runs over 15 games. He was assigned to the High-A Brooklyn Cyclones to open the 2025 season. In June, Benge was promoted to the Double-A Binghamton Rumble Ponies. He was also selected to represent the Mets (alongside Jonah Tong) at the 2025 All-Star Futures Game at Truist Park. In August, he was promoted to the Triple-A Syracuse Mets. After four games with Syracuse, he was placed on the injured list but returned to play shortly. Over 116 games between the three affiliates, Benge hit .281 with 15 home runs, 73 RBI and 22 stolen bases. He was named the Mets Minor League Player of the Year.

=== Major leagues ===
On March 23, 2026, the Mets announced that Benge had made the team's Opening Day roster. He made his Major League debut on March 26 against the Pittsburgh Pirates during the Mets' home opener, hitting a home run off Justin Lawrence for his first major league hit. On May 13, Benge hit his first career walk-off RBI off of Detroit Tigers pitcher Drew Anderson in the 10th inning, giving the Mets a 3–2 victory. Against the San Diego Padres on June 7, he tallied five hits, which included a home run and his first career triple. On September 19, during a 10–3 victory over the Philadelphia Phillies, Benge recorded his 156th hit of the season, surpassing Pete Alonso for the most hits by a Met in their rookie season. Benge hit his 20th home run of the season off of Andrew Alvarez on September 25 against the Washington Nationals, becoming the first rookie in Mets history to have a 20–20 season and the 18th overall in MLB history.

Benge played in 156 games for the Mets in 2026, slashing .282/.346/.430 with 20 home runs, 22 stolen bases, 86 runs scored, and 65 RBI. After the season, he was named a finalist for the Gold Glove Award for National League right fielders. He finished second in National League Rookie of the Year voting behind winner Sal Stewart.

== Personal life ==
Benge is a Cherokee Nation citizen. Benge's older brother, Garrett, was drafted in the 2017 Major League Baseball draft in the 13th round by the Boston Red Sox.
