= Julie Dusanko =

Canadian baseball player

- Third base
- Born: February 22, 1922; Regina, Saskatchewan, Canada
- Died: August 22, 2003 (aged 81); Scottsdale, Arizona, United States
- Batted: Right Threw: Right

Teams
- Minneapolis Millerettes (1944); Racine Belles (1944)

Career highlights and awards
- Canadian Baseball Hall of Fame and Museum Honorary Induction (1998); Women in Baseball – AAGPBL Permanent Display at Baseball Hall of Fame and Museum (1988)

Julie Dusanko [Sabo] (February 22, 1922 – August 22, 2003) was a Canadian infielder who played in the All-American Girls Professional Baseball League (AAGPBL). Listed at 5' 5", 122 lb., Dusanko batted and threw right-handed. She was born as Julianna Rita Sabo in Regina, Saskatchewan. Dusanko was one of 68 girls from Canada who played in the All-American Girls Professional Baseball League during its 12-year history.

Dusanko joined the league during the 1944 season, dividing her playing time with the Minneapolis Millerettes and the Racine Belles.

After that, she remained in the United States to play in the National Girls Baseball League of Chicago with the Parichy Bloomer Girls. She then returned to Canada to play fastpitch softball and was a member of two championship teams.

She moved to Arizona in 1963 with her husband Eugene Dusanko, an air force man she had married two months before joining the league in 1944. The couple had a son, named Richard, who died in 1991 at the age of 28. Her husband died the same year at 67 years old.

In 1988, Dusanko received further recognition when she became part of Women in Baseball, a permanent display based at the Baseball Hall of Fame and Museum in Cooperstown, New York, which was unveiled to honor the entire All-American Girls Professional Baseball League. She also gained honorary induction into the Canadian Baseball Hall of Fame in 1998.

Dusanko died in 2003 at her home in Scottsdale, Arizona at the age of 81.

== Career statistics ==
Batting

GP	AB	R	H	2B	3B	HR	RBI	SB	TB	BB	SO	BA	OBP	SLG
76	246	21	41	3	2	0	16	29	48	21	26	.167	.232	.195

Fielding

GP	PO	A	E	TC	DP	FA
58	123	150	38	311	10	.878
