= Yukon, Oklahoma =

City in Oklahoma, US

- City
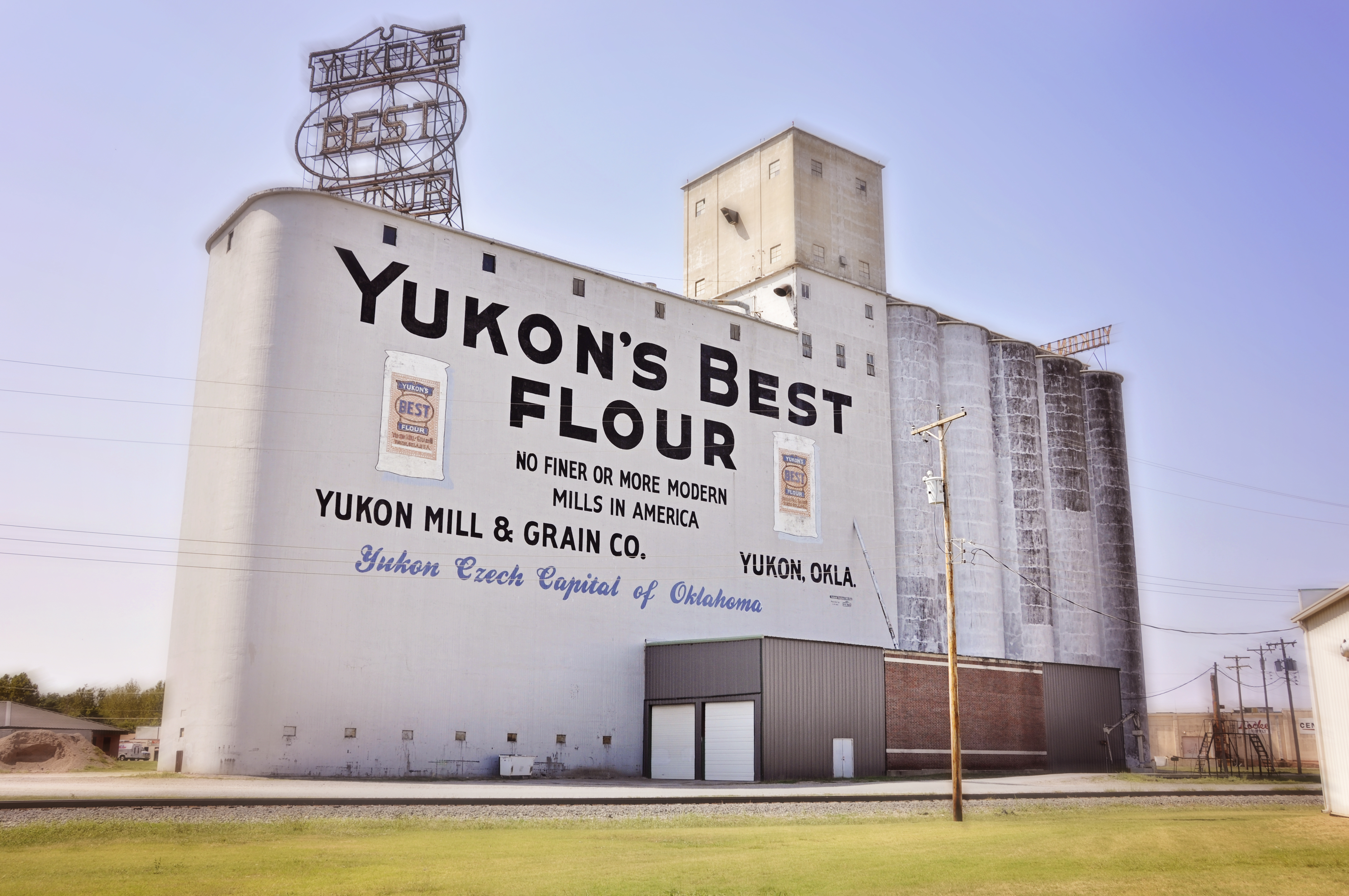
- Yukon's Best Flour mill, located on U.S. Route 66

- Logo

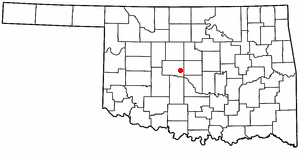
- Location of Yukon, Oklahoma
- Coordinates: 35°31′12″N 97°45′50″W
- Country: United States
- State: Oklahoma
- County: Canadian
- Established: 1901

Government
  - Type: Council-Manager Government
  - Mayor: Brian Pillmore (as of 2024)
  - Vice Mayor: Jeff Wootton (as of 2024)

Area
  - Total: 26.60 sq mi (68.89 km^{2})
  - Land: 26.54 sq mi (68.74 km^{2})
  - Water: 0.058 sq mi (0.15 km^{2})
- Elevation: 1,273 ft (388 m)

Population (2020)
  - Total: 23,630
  - Density: 890.3/sq mi (343.76/km^{2})
- Time zone: UTC−6 (Central (CST))
  - Summer (DST): UTC−5 (CDT)
- ZIP codes: 73085, 73099
- Area code: 405
- FIPS code: 40-82950
- GNIS feature ID: 2412327
- Website: www.cityofyukonok.gov

Yukon is a city in eastern Canadian County, Oklahoma, United States. The population was 23,630 at the 2020 census. Founded in the 1890s, the town was named in reference to a gold rush in Yukon Territory, Canada, at the time. Historically, Yukon served as an urban center for area farmers and the site of a milling operation. Currently, it is primarily a residential community for people who work in the Oklahoma City Metropolitan Area.

== History ==
Yukon was founded by A.N. Spencer in 1891 and was named for the Yukon River which flows from British Columbia, across the Yukon, and into Alaska.

Spencer, a cattleman from Texas turned railroad builder, was working on a line from El Reno to Arkansas when he decided to build the town. Spencer filed the plat on the townsite on February 14, 1891. He had agreed to do so and lay the train tracks through the town in exchange for half of the lots, which were owned by Minnie Taylor and Luther S. Morrison. Taylor and Morrison had acquired the land in the 1889 land run. Spencer also bought two quarter sections south of Main Street from Joseph Carson and his sister, Josephine. Spencer and his brother, Lewis, named the town after the Yukon Territory of Canada, where a gold rush was booming at the time.

The first houses and businesses were located on the north side of Spencer Avenue (now Main Street) and present Fourth and Fifth streets. The Canadian County Courier reported on April 1, 1891, that the city had 25 homes, one bank, two real estate offices, two restaurants, a lumber yard, a hardware store, a grocery, a livery stable, two saloons, a blacksmith shop, a printing office, a barber shop, and a second barber shop "about completed."

The Choctaw, Oklahoma and Gulf Railway Company laid its track, causing the abandonment of Frisco, which had a population of 1,000 at the time. Beginning in about 1898, Yukon began to attract immigrants from Bohemia. Following World War I and the dissolution of Bohemia into Czechoslovakia and Moravia, the immigrants became known as "Czechs." Yukon is known as the "Czech Capital of Oklahoma".

The town voted to incorporate in 1901 and voted to add water works, sewer, and electricity from the mill in 1910. Businesses remained clustered on Main Street between Fourth and Fifth, until the 1920s, when they began to locate in other parts of the town. The interurban was built from Oklahoma City to El Reno in 1911. It closed in 1940. Paved roads didn't arrive until the construction of State Highway 66 in 1926.

Yukon thrived as the urban center for area farmers and had an organized library by 1905 and a dedicated library building in 1927. A small milling operation, the Yukon Mill and Grain Company, opened in 1893 and grew to shipping flour and feeds throughout the south and exporting them overseas by 1915. The milling operation was owned by the Kroutil and Dobry families, but the Dobry family built their own mill and parted ways with the Kroutils in the 1930s. The mills were sold to larger corporations; Shawnee Mills purchased the Yukon Mill and Grain Company and Mid-Continent purchased the Dobry Mills. Paying homage to that history, the students of Yukon High School are known as "Millers", and their mascot is "The Miller Man".

In 1949, Yukon garnered national media attention because of the plight of Grady the Cow, who was stuck inside a silo for four days.

From a population of 830 in 1907, Yukon grew to 1,990 by 1950. By 1960, the population registered at 3,076. Oklahoma City annexed nearly all of the land around Yukon during the 1960s. This brought a boom in residential construction and commercial development. The town had grown to approximately 22,000 residents in 2005.

== Geography ==
Yukon is located in east central Canadian County. The western boundary of Oklahoma City is at the county line 3.5 miles east of the center of Yukon. The town is traversed by Route 66 and state highways 4 and 92. It lies just north of Interstate 40. Downtown Oklahoma City is 16 miles (26 km) to the east.

According to the United States Census Bureau, the city has a total area of 26.3 square miles (68.1 km^{2}), of which 26.2 square miles (67.9 km^{2}) is land and 0.04 square miles (0.1 km^{2}), or 0.21%, is water.

== Demographics ==
Historical population
Census	Pop.	Note	%±
1910	1,018		—
1920	1,016		−0.2%
1930	1,455		43.2%
1940	1,660		14.1%
1950	1,990		19.9%
1960	3,076		54.6%
1970	8,411		173.4%
1980	17,112		103.4%
1990	20,935		22.3%
2000	21,043		0.5%
2010	22,709		7.9%
2020	23,630		4.1%
2022 (est.)	25,556		8.2%
U.S. Decennial Census

=== 2020 census ===
As of the 2020 census, Yukon had a population of 23,630. The median age was 39.0 years. 24.5% of residents were under the age of 18 and 19.1% of residents were 65 years of age or older. For every 100 females there were 90.6 males, and for every 100 females age 18 and over there were 87.6 males age 18 and over.

98.2% of residents lived in urban areas, while 1.8% lived in rural areas.

There were 9,258 households in Yukon, of which 33.6% had children under the age of 18 living in them. Of all households, 52.4% were married-couple households, 15.0% were households with a male householder and no spouse or partner present, and 26.7% were households with a female householder and no spouse or partner present. About 25.1% of all households were made up of individuals and 12.7% had someone living alone who was 65 years of age or older.

There were 9,792 housing units, of which 5.5% were vacant. Among occupied housing units, 71.1% were owner-occupied and 28.9% were renter-occupied. The homeowner vacancy rate was 0.9% and the rental vacancy rate was 9.7%.

Racial composition as of the 2020 census
Race	Percent
White	77.7%
Black or African American	2.2%
American Indian and Alaska Native	3.9%
Asian	2.4%
Native Hawaiian and Other Pacific Islander	0.1%
Some other race	2.6%
Two or more races	11.1%
Hispanic or Latino (of any race)	8.0%

=== 2010 census ===
As of the 2010 census, there were 22,709 people, 8,744 households, and 6,390 families residing in the city. The population density was 880 inhabitants per square mile (340/km^{2}). There were 9,231 housing units at an average density of 315.8 per square mile (121.9/km^{2}). The racial makeup of the city was 87.8% white, 1.2% African American, 3.7% Native American, 2% Asian, 0.1% Pacific Islander, 1.5% from other races, and 3.7% from two or more races. Hispanic or Latino of any race made up 4.9% of the population.

There were 8,744 households, out of which 38.2% had children under the age of 18 living with them, 59.6% were married couples living together, 10.9% had a female householder with no husband present, and 26.4% were non-families. Single individuals living alone accounted for 21% of households and individuals 65 years of age or older living alone accounted for 9.2% of households. The average household size was 2.57 and the average family size was 2.97.

In the city, the population was spread out, with 26.2% under the age of 18, 59.9% from 18 to 64, and 13.9% who were 65 years of age or older. The median age was 37.7 years. The population was 52.8% female and 47.2% male.

The median income for a household in the city was $59,803, and the median income for a family was $66,635. Males had a median income of $49,836 versus $34,717 for females. About 6.5% of families and 8.5% of the population were below the poverty line.

== Arts and culture ==
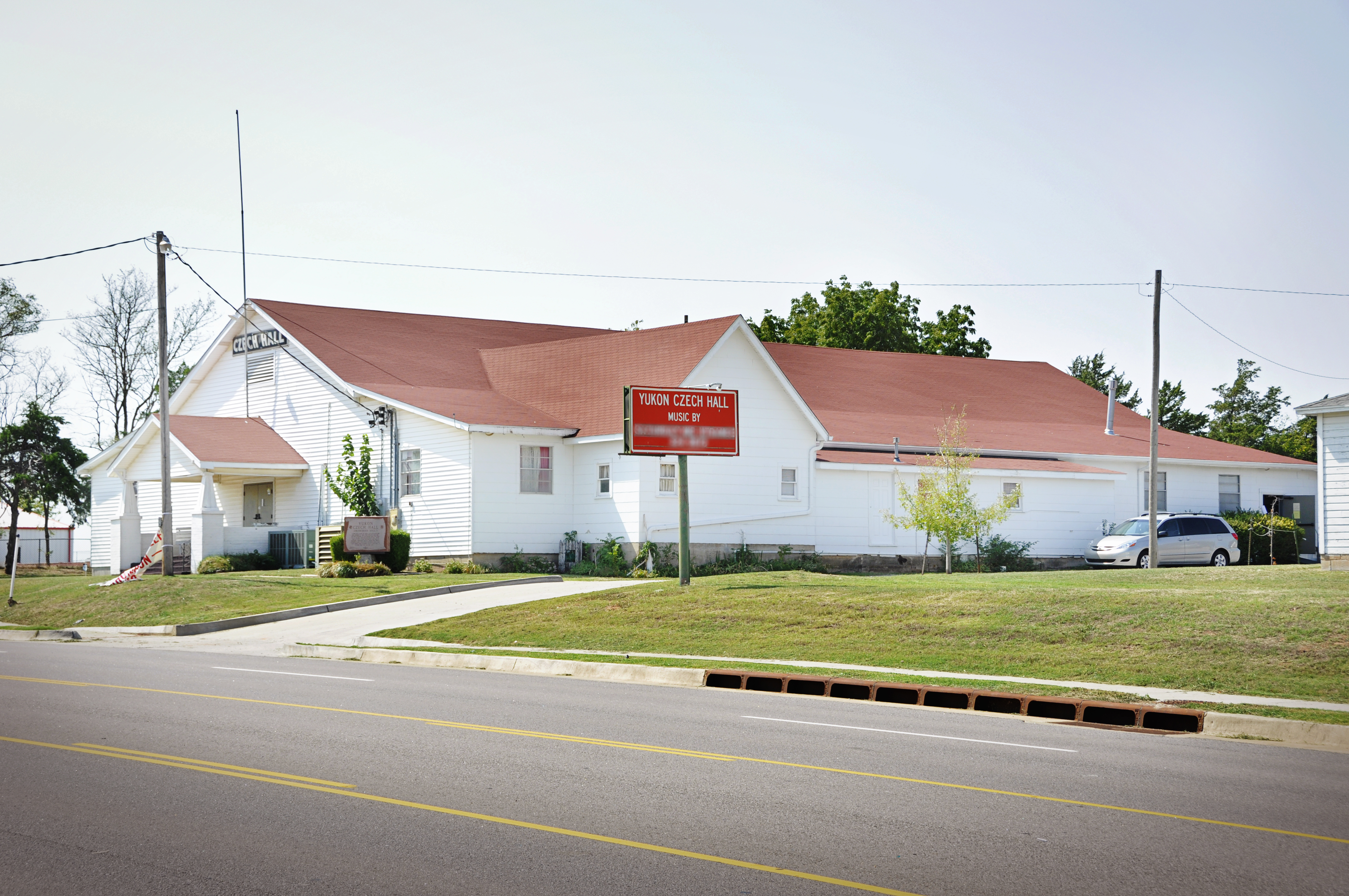
Czech Hall in Yukon

The Czech Hall, a national and state historic site, is devoted to preserving Czech customs, heritage, and culture. Community events include the Czech Festival, which takes place on the first Saturday of October, and the Chisholm Trail and Crawfish Festival, which takes place on the first Saturday of June. In late August Yukon also holds a country music festival, called "Rock the Route."

== Government ==
Yukon has a Council-Manager government. This form of government combines elected officials with an appointed manager. All authority to set policy rests with a nonpartisan Mayor and City Council. The governing body in turn hires a nonpartisan manager who has broad authority to run the organization. Yukon is divided into four geographical wards and one at-large ward. A representative from each Ward are the five members of the City Council. They are elected to four-year terms. The voters of each Ward elect a council member to represent them and the Mayor is elected yearly by council. The Mayor and Council appoint a City Manager to serve as the city's chief administrative official. The Mayor and Council also appoint the City Attorney and Municipal Court judges.

== Education ==
The Yukon Public Schools district covers most of Yukon. It includes 11 schools, served a community of 36,938 people, and encompasses 66.10 square miles of land and 2.18 square miles of water. The school district offers pre-school through secondary school education. The school served 8,781 students in the 2017–2018 school year.

Parts of Yukon are zoned to Banner Public School and some other parts are zoned to Riverside Public School .

The high school has won state titles in softball in 1986, 1991, 1997, 2000, and 2010; in boys basketball in 1974 and 1979; in baseball in 1982, 1996, and 1997; and cheerleading in 2002.

== Notable people ==
- Joe Albertson, founder of the Albertsons chain of grocery stores and a notable philanthropist; born in Yukon
- Dan Bailey, kicker for Oklahoma State University and Dallas Cowboys

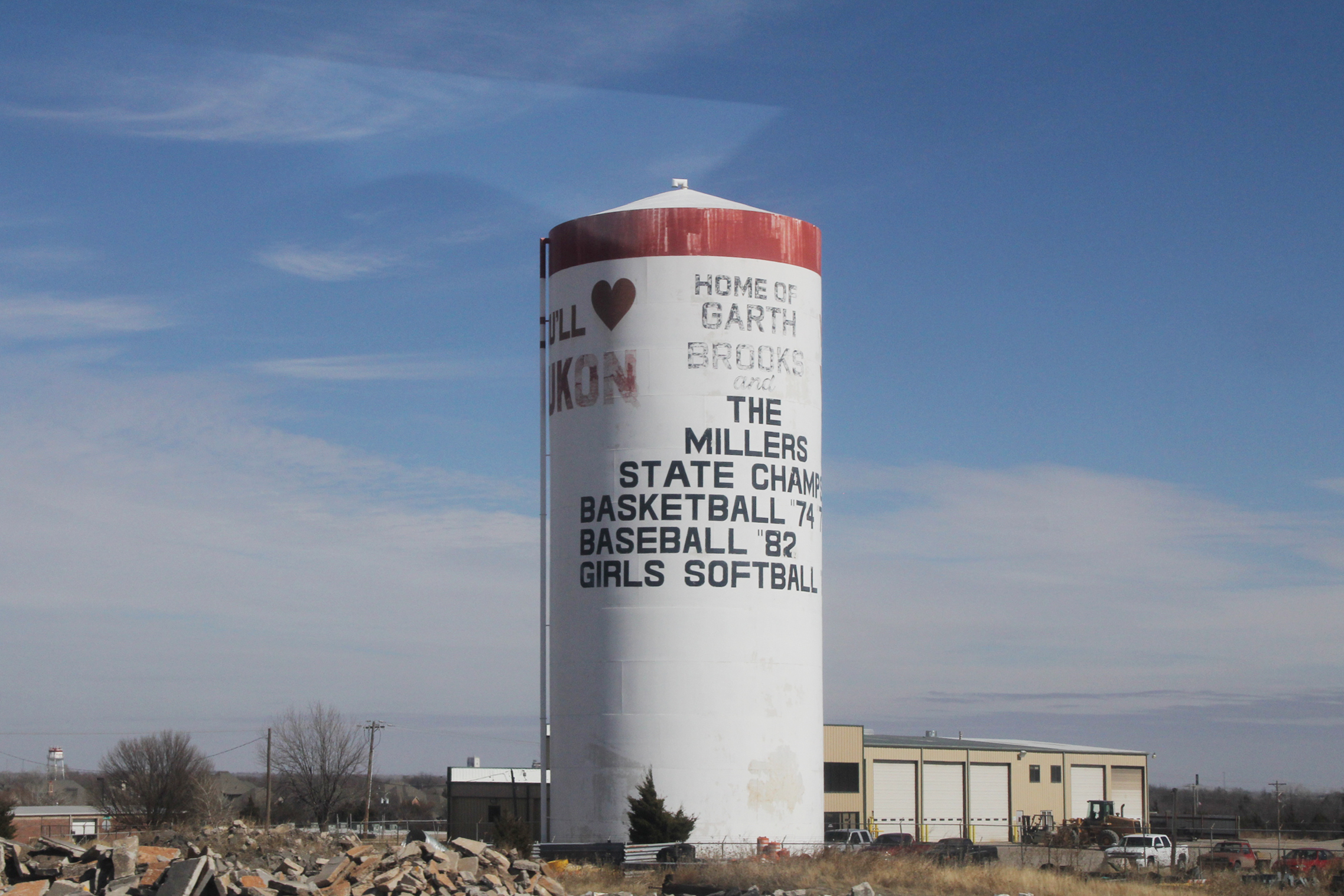
Garth Brooks water tower

- Phil Ball, former UCO football coach.
- Garth Brooks, country music singer; grew up in Yukon
- Josh Shipp, motivational speaker: grew up in Yukon
- Brad Dalke, golfer; born in Yukon
- Max Gleason, a cappella YouTube musician "Smooth McGroove"
- Steve Heller, writer; raised near Yukon
- Daniel Lewis Lee, convicted murderer; born in Yukon
- Cross Canadian Ragweed, band founded in Yukon
- Ed Roberts, poet and author; born in Yukon
- Dale Robertson, actor in films and television's Tales of Wells Fargo, The Iron Horse and ABC's 1981 hit Dynasty
- Carson Benge, outfielder for the New York Mets

== See also ==
- Yukon Public Schools
