= Lillian Jackson =

American baseball player (1919–2003)

- Outfield
- Born: August 4, 1919; Nashville, Tennessee, U.S.
- Died: October 30, 2003 (aged 84); Tucson, Arizona, U.S.
- Batted: Right Threw: Right

Teams
- Rockford Peaches (1943); Minneapolis Millerettes (1944); Fort Wayne Daisies (1945)

Career highlights and awards
- Women in Baseball – AAGPBL Permanent Display at Baseball Hall of Fame and Museum (1988)

Lillian Jackson (August 4, 1919 – October 30, 2003), nicknamed "Bird Dog", was an American outfielder who played in the All-American Girls Professional Baseball League (AAGPBL). Listed at 5 ft 6 in (1.68 m), 125 lb, she batted and threw right-handed.

Lillian Jackson was one of the original founding members of the All-American Girls Professional Baseball League in its 1943 inaugural season.

Born in Nashville, Tennessee, Jackson was not involved in sport as a child. She began playing basketball and softball at age 18, while attending Isaac Litton High School. She later took classes at Nashville Business College and played on their softball team, where she was spotted by a AAGPBL scout who invited her to the final tryouts of the league at Wrigley Field. Once the final cut was made, Jackson and another 59 of the 280 girls who tried out were chosen to become the first women to ever play professional baseball. She was relocated to the Rockford Peaches.

Jackson saw little action during her rookie year. She was traded to the expansion Minneapolis Millerettes before the 1944 season. One of her teammates, Faye Dancer, gained notoriety by her practical jokes on and off the ball field, especially on the chaperones. One day, Dancer said Jackson ran the bases and the outfield like a ״Bird Dog״, and it stuck throughout her career. That season Jackson posted a .201 average, a pretty good performance considering it was a dominant pitching league and no batters surpassed .300 on the year. She also scored 23 runs and stole 24 bases in just 58 games.

The Minneapolis franchise folded before the 1945 season and was replaced by the Fort Wayne Daisies. In her final game for the Daisies, Jackson chased a foul ball into the left field bleachers and caught the ball for the final out of the game, falling in the bleachers and splitting her upper lip. Fort Wayne won the game, but she paid the price with four stitches to close the lip.

In 1946, Jackson moved to Chicago to play in the rival National Girls Baseball League during five seasons before giving up the game. She stayed in Chicago and went to work for Sunbeam Corporation, where she became a manager before retiring after 31 years of service.

The All-American Girls Professional Baseball League suspended operations after the 1954 season. Then in 1980, former pitcher June Peppas launched a newsletter project to get in touch with friends, teammates and opponents, that resulted in the league's first-ever reunion in Chicago in 1982. Starting from that reunion, the AAGPBL Players Association was formed five years later and many former players of the defunct league continued to enjoy reunions. Jackson volunteered to help and was elected to the board of directors.

The association was largely responsible for the opening of Women in Baseball, a permanent display at the Baseball Hall of Fame and Museum in Cooperstown, New York, which was unveiled in 1988 to honor the entire All-American Girls Professional Baseball League. It was not really a well known fact until filmmaker Penny Marshall premiered her 1992 film A League of Their Own, which was a fictionalized account of activities in the AAGPBL during its first season. Starring Geena Davis, Tom Hanks, Madonna, Lori Petty and Rosie O'Donnell, this film brought many of the real AAGPBL former players a rebirth of celebrity. Jackson provided advice and assistance to Marshall and the production team before and during the filming process.

Lillian Jackson was a longtime resident of Green Valley, Arizona, where she lived with her friend and companion Ruth Heiden. She died in 2003 in Tucson following a brief illness at the age of 84.

== Career statistics ==
Batting

GP	AB	R	H	2B	3B	HR	RBI	SB	TB	BB	SO	BA	OBP	SLG
120	367	47	59	2	3	1	31	31	70	27	39	.161	.224	.191

Fielding

GP	PO	A	E	TC	DP	FA
108	110	13	11	134	2	.918
