= Steve Heller (fiction) =

American author

Steve Heller is an American author. His novel The Automotive History of Lucky Kellerman was a selection of the Book-of-the-Month Club. His writings have earned a National Endowment for the Arts Fellowship and two O. Henry Awards. He was the chair, Master of Fine Arts in Creative Writing Program at Antioch University Los Angeles.

Heller grew up near Yukon, Oklahoma. He has a B.A. in English, M.S. in English Education from Oklahoma State University, and M.F.A. in creative writing from Bowling Green State University. Heller began teaching as an English instructor at Ponca City High School. In 1990 he received the Kansas Literary Artists Fellowship in Fiction, and in 1996 the Kansas Governor's Arts Award.

== Works ==
- The Man Who Drank A Thousand Beers, a collection, Chariton Review Press, 1984 ISBN 0-933428-03-0
- The Automotive History of Lucky Kellerman, Chelsea Green, 1987 ISBN 0-930031-09-1
- Father's Mechanical Universe, BkMk Press, 2001 ISBN 1-886157-32-4
- What We Choose to Remember, Serving House Books, 2009, ISBN 0-982546-26-2
- Walking Through the Moon: A Family Memoir, (in progress)

== Reviews ==
Although criticizing the ending, The New York Times called Lucky Kellerman a "quiet and often beautiful book". The Los Angeles Times described it as "mesmerizing but relentlessly grim".
