= List of people from Illinois =

List of notable people from Illinois

State flag of Illinois

Location of Illinois in the United States

This is a list of notable individuals who come from the state of Illinois, a state within the larger United States of America.

== A ==
Aa–Ag

- Emma Abbott (1850–91), opera soprano; born and raised in Illinois until age 16; funeral held in Illinois, but interred in Massachusetts
- Margaret Abbott (1878–1955), first modern-era Olympic United States female champion; lived during her teens and learned her Olympic sport of golf in Illinois
- Robert Sengstacke Abbott (1868–1940), African-American lawyer, newspaper publisher and editor; studied law and had his newspaper career in Chicago
- Jessica Abel (born 1969), comic book writer and artist; born and educated in Illinois
- Gertrude Abercrombie (1909–77), surrealist painter; lived most of her life in Chicago and known for her association with the city
- David Abidor (born 1992), soccer player
- Max Abramovitz (1908–2004), architect; born and college-educated in Illinois
- Ben Abruzzo (1930–85), balloonist; born and college-educated in Illinois
- Tony Accardo (1906–1992), organized crime figure; born and lived entire life in Chicago metropolitan area
- Barbara Acklin (1943–98), singer; came to Illinois aged five and resided there until her death
- Ron Acks (1944–2023), NFL linebacker 1968–76; born, attended high school and college in Illinois
- Valdas Adamkus (born 1926), president of Lithuania 1998–2009; lived in Illinois for a number of years after emigrating to the United States from Lithuania, getting a college degree and entering Chicago politics
- Mike Adamle, NFL and Northwestern running back, TV personality
- Berle Adams (1917–2009), founder of Mercury Records; born and lived first 30 years in Illinois
- Franklin P. Adams (1881–1960), writer, member of Algonquin Round Table; described as "a native of Chicago", found fame and lived most of his life in New York
- John Hicks Adams (1820–78), gunslinger, Wild West lawman; born and attended college in Illinois
- Katrina Adams (born 1968), president of United States Tennis Association; born and educated in Illinois
- Robert McCormick Adams Jr., anthropologist, secretary of Smithsonian Institution
- Brett Adcock (born 1986), founder of Figure AI, a robotics company
- Jane Addams, social worker, teacher, Nobel Peace Prize recipient
- George Ade, author and cartoonist (born in Indiana)
- Paul Adelstein, actor, Prison Break, Private Practice
- Victor Adeyanju, NFL defensive end 2006–10
- Dankmar Adler, architect (born in Germany)
- David Adler, architect (born in Wisconsin)
- Lou Adler, music producer in Rock and Roll Hall of Fame
- Max Adler, founder of Adler Planetarium
- Scott Adsit, actor, writer, improvisational comedian, 30 Rock, Big Hero 6
- John Agar, actor, Sands of Iwo Jima, She Wore a Yellow Ribbon, husband of Shirley Temple
- Alex Agase, football player for Cleveland Browns; head coach of Northwestern, Purdue
- Lou Agase, football player for Illinois, coach of CFL's Toronto Argonauts
- Milton Ager, composer, "Ain't She Sweet", "Happy Days Are Here Again"
- Benjamin Agosto, ice dancer, 2006 Turin Olympics silver medalist
- Mark Aguirre, forward for DePaul, NBA's Dallas Mavericks and Detroit Pistons; top pick of 1981 NBA draft

Ah–Am

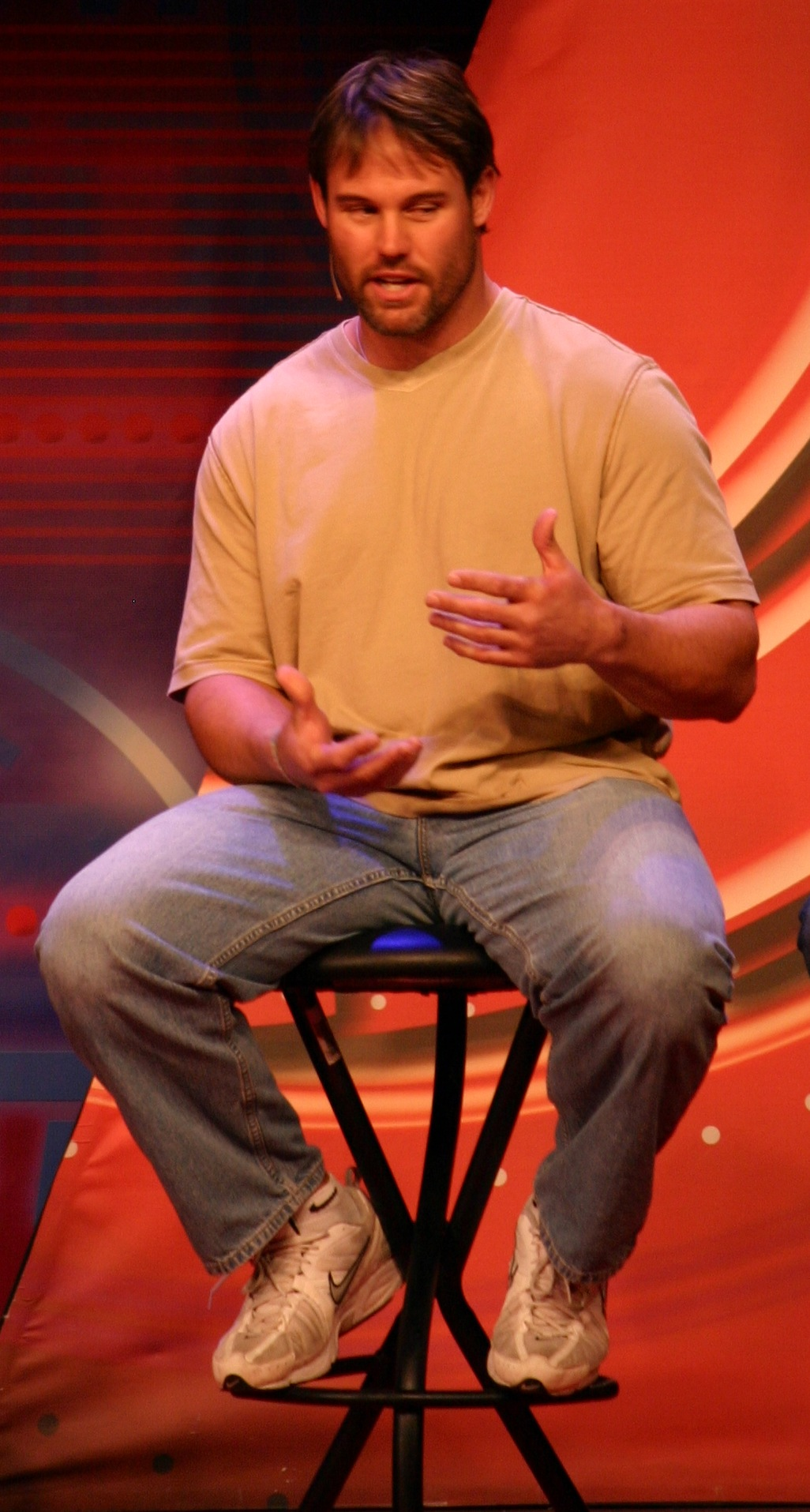
Mike Alstott

- Gene Ahern, cartoonist
- Joe Aiello, organized crime figure (born in Sicily)
- Joseph Aiuppa, organized crime figure
- Stan Albeck, basketball head coach, Bradley, Cleveland Cavaliers, San Antonio Spurs, Chicago Bulls
- Abraham Adrian Albert, mathematician
- Eddie Albert, Oscar-nominated actor, Green Acres, Switch, Oklahoma!, Roman Holiday, The Heartbreak Kid, The Longest Yard
- Frankie Albert, quarterback and head coach for San Francisco 49ers, College Football Hall of Famer
- Bruce Alberts, biochemist, original author of Molecular Biology of the Cell
- Steve Albini, musician, producer
- Ted Albrecht, offensive tackle for Purdue and Chicago Bears
- Ivan Albright, painter
- James L. Alcorn, governor and U.S. senator of Mississippi
- Jody Alderson, swimmer, 1952 Olympic bronze medalist
- Dorothy Aldis, children's author
- J. Frank Aldrich, 19th-century U.S. representative (born in Wisconsin)
- Gus Alex, organized crime figure
- Dan Alexander, football player, 2000 Alamo Bowl MVP
- Houston Alexander, mixed martial artist
- Linsey Alexander, blues musician (born in Mississippi)
- Lorez Alexandria, jazz and gospel singer
- Nelson Algren, author, The Man with the Golden Arm, A Walk on the Wild Side (born in Michigan)
- Rita Ali, mayor of Peoria
- Saul Alinsky, founder of modern community organizing and writer
- Paul Alivisatos, president, University of Chicago
- Brian Allard, MLB pitcher 1979–81
- Jeff Allen, NFL offensive guard 2012–19
- Joan Allen, Oscar-nominated actress, The Bourne Ultimatum, The Contender, The Upside of Anger, Nixon, Face/Off
- Karen Allen, actress, Indiana Jones and the Kingdom of the Crystal Skull, Raiders of the Lost Ark, Animal House, Scrooged
- Leo E. Allen, 14-term U.S. representative
- Leslie Allen, auto racer, ninth in 1930 Indianapolis 500
- Rex Allen Jr., country singer, narrator of film Me, Myself and Irene
- Ronnie Allen, professional pool player
- Sandy Allen, tallest U.S. woman
- Steve Allen, TV personality, actor, author, songwriter, first host of The Tonight Show (born in New York)
- Tony Allen, NBA forward 2004–18, member of 2008 champion Boston Celtics
- William J. Allen, judge, U.S. representative (born in Tennessee)
- Justin Allgaier, auto racer, 2008 ARCA RE/MAX Series champion
- Fran Allison, radio-TV personality, Kukla, Fran and Ollie (born in Iowa)
- Luther Allison, blues musician (born in Arkansas)
- Samuel Allison, prominent physicist who worked on Manhattan Project
- Arthur Allyn Jr., co-owner of Chicago White Sox in 1960s
- John Allyn, owner of White Sox 1961–75
- Alfred S. Alschuler, architect
- Mike Alstott, fullback for Tampa Bay Buccaneers 1996–2007, Super Bowl XXXVII champion
- Jonathan Alter, journalist and author
- Michael J. Alter, real estate developer, owner of WNBA's Chicago Sky
- John Peter Altgeld, governor of Illinois 1893–97 (born in Germany)
- Dave Altizer, MLB infielder 1906–11
- Scott Altman, astronaut, four Space Shuttle missions
- John Altschuler, screenwriter, Blades of Glory, Silicon Valley
- Anita Alvarez, Cook County state's attorney 2008–16
- John Alvin, actor, The Beast with Five Fingers, Objective, Burma!
- Stephen E. Ambrose, author, historian, Band of Brothers
- Kiran Amegadjie, lineman for Yale, third-round pick in 2024 NFL draft
- The American Breed, band, "Bend Me, Shape Me"
- A.A. Ames, four-term mayor of Minneapolis
- Edward Ames, founder, McKendree University (born in Ohio)
- Julia A. Ames, 19th-century journalist
- Knowlton Ames, college football player and coach
- Rosemary Ames, actress, Our Little Girl, Pursued
- Warren Amling, Ohio State athlete in College Football Hall of Fame
- Albert Ammons, jazz musician
- Gene Ammons, jazz musician
- Morey Amsterdam, actor and comedian, The Dick Van Dyke Show

An–Ar

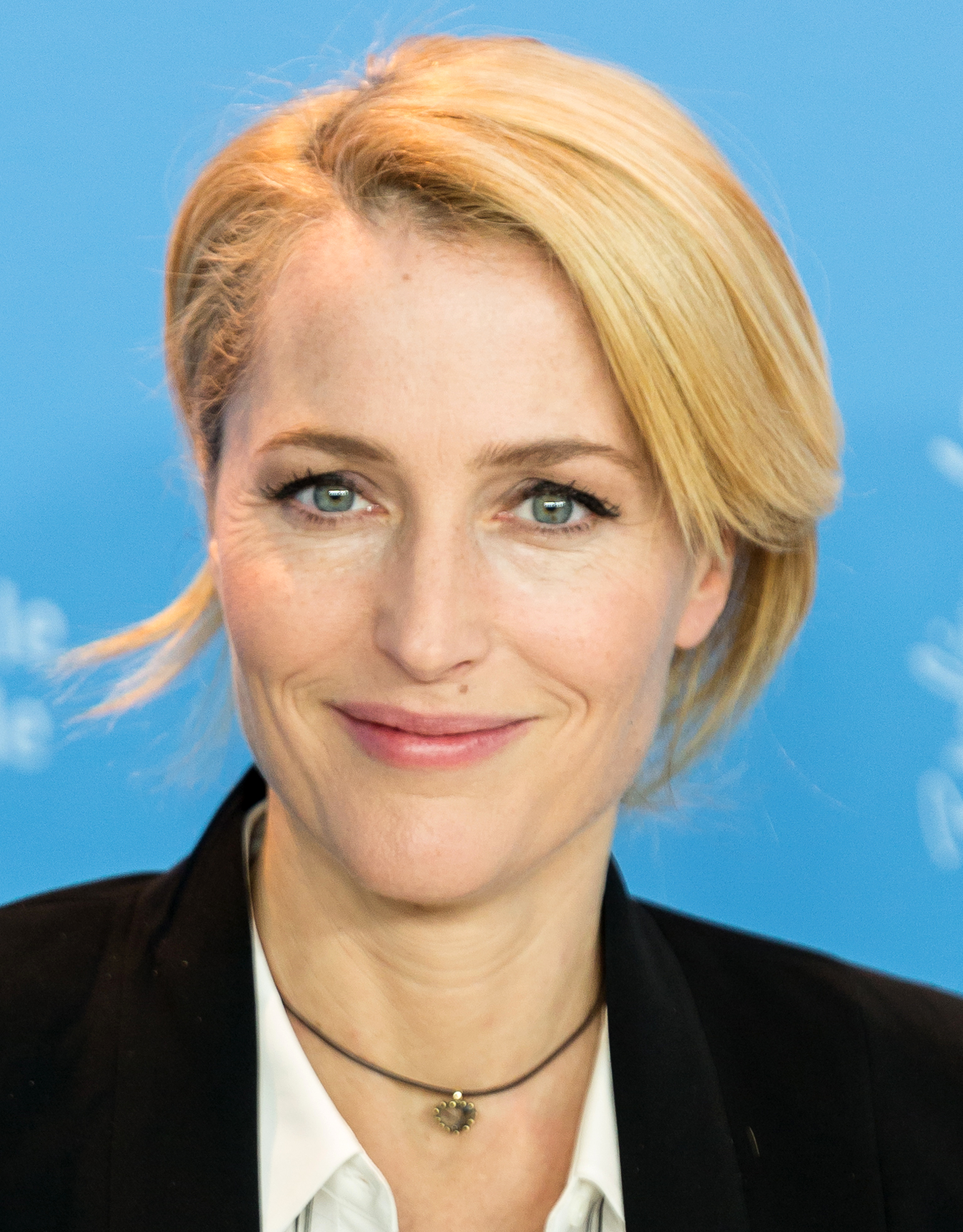
Gillian Anderson

Ann-Margret

- Merry Anders, actress, The Dalton Girls, Hear Me Good, Tickle Me
- Arthur E. Andersen, founder of accounting firm
- Alexandria Anderson, NCAA champion sprinter
- Andree Anderson, ice dancer, member of Figure Skating Hall of Fame
- Craig Anderson, NHL goaltender 2002–23
- Gillian Anderson, Emmy Award-winning actress, The X-Files, The House of Mirth, Bleak House, Hannibal
- J. J. Anderson, forward for Bradley and Utah Jazz
- John Anderson, actor, Ride the High Country, Psycho
- John B. Anderson, politician, U.S. representative 1961–81, U.S. presidential candidate
- Ken Anderson, NFL quarterback 1971–86, four-time Pro Bowl selection
- Kevin Anderson, actor, Sleeping with the Enemy, Miles from Home, Hoffa
- Kurt Anderson, football player and coach
- Laurie Anderson, performance artist and musician
- Les Anderson, auto racer, 11th in 1947 Indy 500
- Margaret C. Anderson, editor and publisher (born in Indiana)
- Nick Anderson, NBA and Illinois guard, first Orlando Magic draft pick
- Peggy Anderson, author and journalist
- Philip Warren Anderson, Nobel Prize-winning physicist
- Ray Anderson, musician
- Robert Orville Anderson, founder of ARCO oil company
- Sherwood Anderson, novelist (born in Ohio)
- Walter Stratton Anderson, naval vice admiral, battleship commander
- Fern Andra, circus performer, actress, director
- Emil Andres, auto racer, drove in nine Indianapolis 500s
- Bruce Andrews, poet
- Stanley Andrews, actor, Death Valley Days
- Ethel Percy Andrus, founder of AARP
- Elmer Angsman, running back for Notre Dame, Chicago Cardinals
- John Ankerberg, Christian evangelist, TV presenter
- Morris Ankrum, actor
- Ann-Margret, Oscar-nominated actress, Bye Bye Birdie, Viva Las Vegas, Carnal Knowledge, The Cincinnati Kid, Tommy (born in Sweden)
- Beulah Annan, inspiration for "Roxie Hart" in play and film Chicago
- Moses Annenberg, newspaper publisher (born in Prussia)
- Frank Annunzio, politician (Democrat), 13-term U.S. representative
- Cap Anson, Hall of Fame infielder for Chicago White Stockings (born in Iowa)
- Bessie Anthony, golfer, U.S. Women's Amateur champion
- Luis Aparicio, Hall of Fame infielder for Chicago White Sox (born in Venezuela)
- Clarence Applegran, basketball coach, Kentucky 1924–25
- Amy Applegren, pro baseball player
- Arthur I. Appleton, businessman, thoroughbred owner
- Luke Appling, Hall of Fame infielder for White Sox (born in North Carolina)
- Lee Archambault, astronaut
- Jim Ardis, mayor of Peoria 2005–21
- Robert Ardrey, playwright and screenwriter, Khartoum, The Three Musketeers
- Leslie C. Arends, politician (Republican), U.S. representative 1943–74, majority and minority whip
- Mark Arie, two gold medals in shooting at 1920 Olympics
- Hub Arkush, publisher of Pro Football Weekly
- Alice Arlen, screenwriter, Silkwood, Alamo Bay
- Andrew Watson Armour III, meat-packing executive, philanthropist
- Philip Danforth Armour, businessman, founder of Armour and Company (born in New York)
- Terron Armstead, NFL offensive lineman
- Matthew John Armstrong, actor, Heroes
- Otis Armstrong, running back for Denver Broncos 1973–80
- Scot Armstrong, screenwriter, Old School, Starsky & Hutch
- Billy Arnold, auto racer, won 1930 Indianapolis 500
- Billy Boy Arnold, blues musician
- Isaac N. Arnold, U.S. representative, author (born in New York)
- Cliff Arquette, comedian and actor (born in Ohio)
- Lewis Arquette, actor, Sherlock Hound, Camp Candy, The Waltons
- Patricia Arquette, Oscar and Emmy-winning actress, Boyhood, Medium, True Romance, CSI: Cyber
- Gerry Arrigo, MLB pitcher 1961–70

As–Az

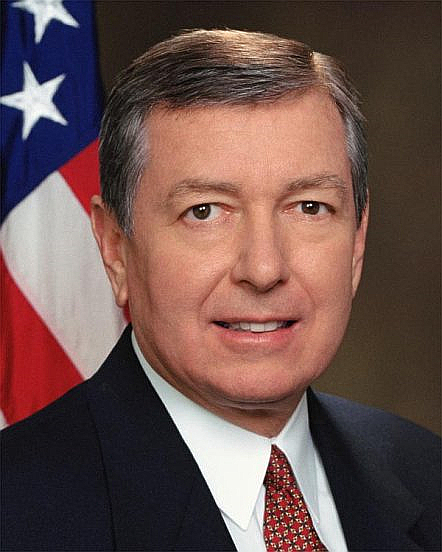
John Ashcroft

- Jon Asamoah, NFL offensive lineman 2010–15
- Diandra Asbaty, bowler
- Tom Ashbrook, NPR personality
- John Ashcroft, politician (Republican), U.S. attorney general 2001–05, Missouri senator and governor
- Darryl Ashmore, NFL tackle 1992–2002
- James N. Ashmore, basketball coach, North Carolina, Iowa, Washington State, DePauw
- Ed Asner, Emmy-winning actor, The Mary Tyler Moore Show, Up, Elf (born in Missouri)
- Mary Astor, Oscar-winning actress, The Maltese Falcon, Dodsworth, Meet Me in St. Louis, The Great Lie
- Joe Astroth, MLB catcher 1945–56
- Ira Aten, lawman, Texas Ranger
- Doug Atkins, defensive end for Chicago Bears 1955–66, Hall of Fame (born in Tennessee)
- Smith D. Atkins, editor, Civil War colonel (born in New York)
- Edith Atwater, actress, True Grit, Family Plot, The Body Snatcher
- Richard and Florence Atwater, co-authors of Mr. Popper's Penguins
- Steve Atwater, NFL safety 1989–99, twice Super Bowl champion with Denver Broncos
- James T. Aubrey Jr., television executive, president of CBS
- David Auburn, playwright, Proof
- Jean M. Auel, author, The Clan of the Cave Bear
- James Augustine, center for Illinois' 2005 NCAA basketball runners-up
- Jeff Austin, mandolinist, singer
- Lovie Austin, jazz musician (born in Tennessee)
- Jason Avant, NFL wide receiver
- Charles Avery, silent film actor, Keystone Cops
- Sewell Avery, chairman of Montgomery Ward, first president of Museum of Science and Industry (born in Michigan)
- John Avildsen, Oscar-winning film director, Rocky, Save the Tiger, Lean on Me, The Karate Kid
- David Axelrod, political advisor to Presidents Bill Clinton and Barack Obama, author, TV commentator
- Brendon Ayanbadejo, NFL linebacker 1999–2012
- Marion Aye, silent-film actress
- David Ayer, screenwriter and director, Training Day, End of Watch, Fury
- Edward E. Ayer, benefactor and first president of Field Museum of Natural History (born in Massachusetts)
- Harriet Hubbard Ayer, 19th-century cosmetics maven, journalist
- Bill Ayers, founder and member of Weather Underground
- Reiko Aylesworth, actress, Michelle Dessler on 24
- Agnes Ayres, silent-film actress
- Irving Azoff, music executive, head of Ticketmaster, Live Nation Entertainment

== B ==
Ba–Bd

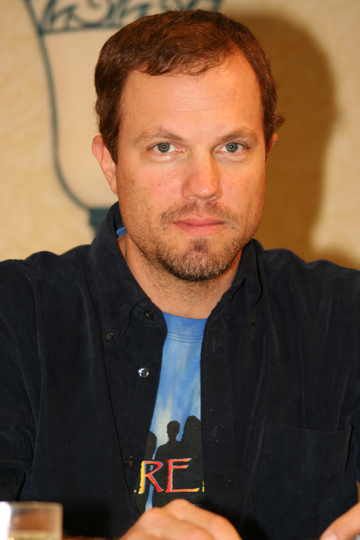
Adam Baldwin

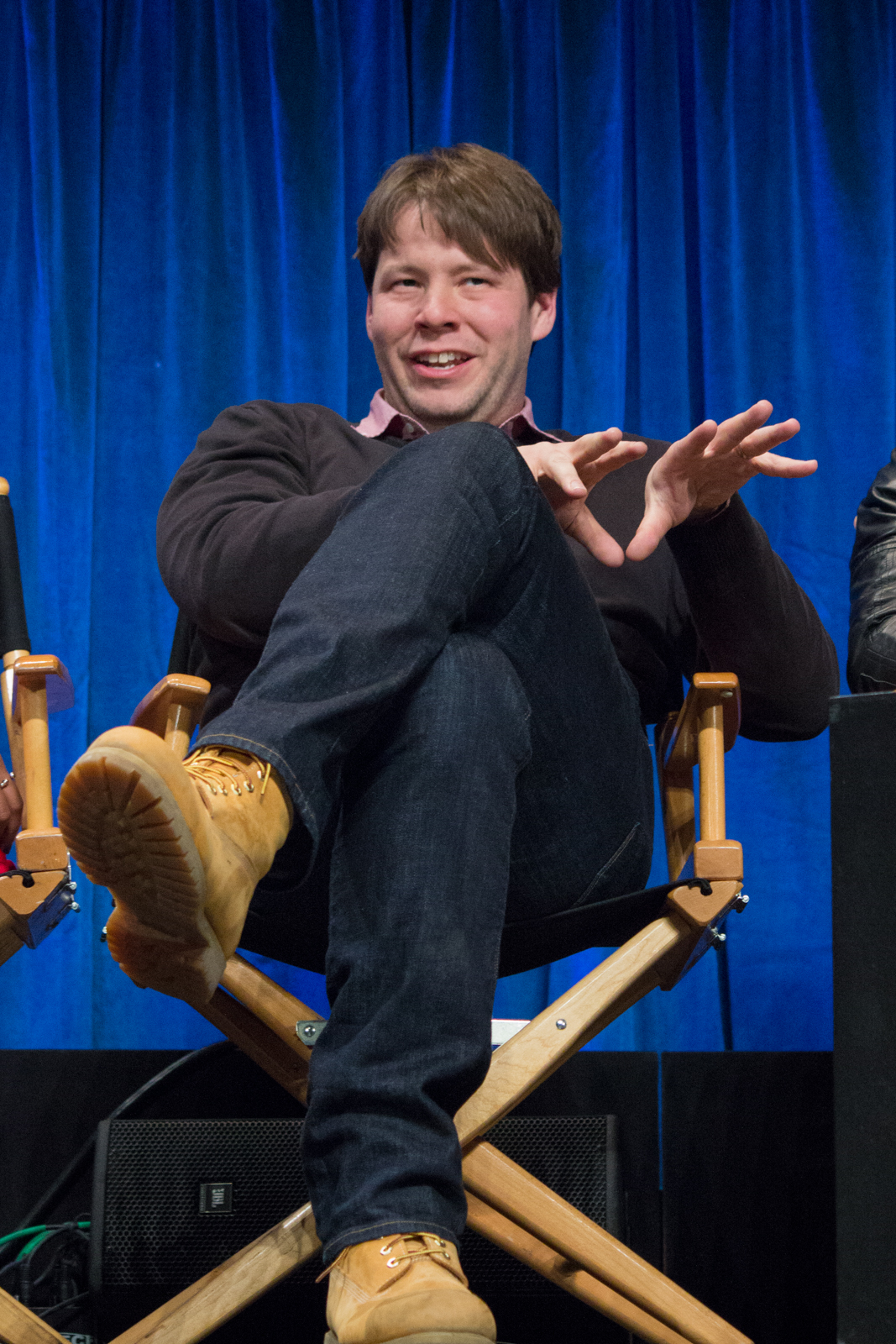
Ike Barinholtz

- Richard Bach, author, Jonathan Livingston Seagull
- Charlie Bachman, football coach, Kansas State, Florida, Michigan State in College Football Hall of Fame
- Bill Bachrach, Olympic swim coach
- Henry Bacon, architect of the Lincoln Memorial
- Mary Bacon, jockey
- Benjamin F. Bailar, United States postmaster general 1975–78
- Amari Bailey, NBA and Israeli Basketball Premier League basketball player
- Chantal Bailey, Olympic speed skater
- Cory Bailey, MLB pitcher 1993–2002
- Willis J. Bailey, governor of Kansas 1903–05
- Barbara Bain, actress, Mission: Impossible
- Harold Baines, Hall of Fame outfielder, coach for Chicago White Sox (born in Maryland)
- Butch Baird, pro golfer
- Leah Baird, silent-film actress
- David J. Baker, judge, U.S. senator for 29 days (born in Connecticut)
- David J. Baker Jr., 19th-century judge
- Edward Dickinson Baker, U.S. representative of Illinois, U.S. senator of Oregon (born in England)
- Jehu Baker, 19th-century politician, U.S. representative (born in Kentucky)
- LaVern Baker, singer in Rock and Roll Hall of Fame
- Ralph Baker, Northwestern halfback in College Football Hall of Fame
- Two Ton Baker, entertainer, radio-TV personality
- A. J. Balaban, theater owner and showman
- Barney Balaban, Hollywood studio chief
- Bob Balaban, actor, Gosford Park, Close Encounters of the Third Kind, Catch-22, Waiting for Guffman
- Frank Balasz, NFL running back 1939–45
- Marcelo Balboa, pro soccer player
- H.C. Baldridge, governor of Idaho 1927–31
- Adam Baldwin, actor, voice actor, blogger, Chuck, Full Metal Jacket, Serenity, My Bodyguard
- Kate Baldwin, actress, singer
- Rosecrans Baldwin, novelist, essayist
- George Ball, diplomat, adviser to JFK and LBJ, U.S. ambassador to United Nations
- Carl Ballantine, magician, comedian, actor, McHale's Navy
- Edwin Balmer, editor of Redbook magazine
- Dan Balz, journalist for Washington Post
- Eddie Bane, MLB pitcher and executive
- Ted Banker, NFL lineman 1983–91
- Ernie Banks, 19-year infielder for Chicago Cubs, in Baseball Hall of Fame (born in Texas)
- Kelcie Banks, boxer, 1987 Pan American Games champion
- Jerry Barber, golfer, winner of 1961 PGA Championship
- Curt Barclay, MLB pitcher 1957–59
- Dave Barclay, golfer, winner of 1947 NCAA championship
- Paris Barclay, Emmy-winning TV director and producer, In Treatment, NYPD Blue, Cold Case
- John Bardeen, winner of two Nobel Prizes in Physics (born in Wisconsin)
- Jesse Barfield, outfielder for Toronto Blue Jays and New York Yankees 1981–92
- Ike Barinholtz, actor, comedian, voice actor, Mad TV, The Mindy Project, The Awesomes
- Al Barlick, Hall of Fame baseball umpire
- Brandon Barnes, rock musician in band Rise Against
- Brenda C. Barnes, CEO of Sara Lee and PepsiCo
- Edward Larrabee Barnes, architect
- Josie Barnes, professional bowler
- Margaret Ayer Barnes, Pulitzer Prize-winning novelist
- Charlene Barnett, pro baseball player
- Robert Barnett, attorney
- Carol Ross Barney, architect
- Dale Barnstable, basketball player for Kentucky, banned by NBA
- Tony Barone, basketball coach, Creighton, Texas A&M and NBA's Memphis Grizzlies
- Joan Barr, mayor of Evanston 1985–93
- Bea Barrett, golfer
- The Barrett Sisters, gospel singers
- Barbara Barrie, Oscar-nominated, Tony Award-winning actress, Barney Miller, Breaking Away
- George Barris, auto customizer, created TV's Batmobile
- Robert Barron, Catholic bishop
- Ed Barrow, baseball manager, executive
- John Barrowman, actor, singer, dancer (born in Scotland)
- Jimmy Barry, 19th-century boxing champion
- Norman Barry, head coach of 1925 NFL champion Chicago Cardinals, judge
- Viola Barry, silent-film actress
- Dick Bartell, shortstop, played in three World Series
- William Bartholomay, owned baseball's Milwaukee and Atlanta Braves
- Bonnie Bartlett, actress, St. Elsewhere (born in Wisconsin)
- Peter Bartlett, actor, One Life to Live
- Dan Barton, actor
- Dick Barwegan, MLB outfielder 1947–54
- Burt Baskin, co-founder of Baskin-Robbins
- Mary Bass, editor of Ladies' Home Journal 1936–63
- Granville Bates, actor
- Bates Battaglia, NHL winger 1997–2008
- Sam Battaglia, organized crime figure
- Kenny Battle, player for four NBA teams
- Lloyd Batts, pro basketball player
- Hank Bauer, outfielder and manager, New York Yankees, Kansas City A's; decorated World War II U.S. Marine
- Sybil Bauer, swimmer, gold medalist at 1924 Summer Olympics
- Tom Baugh, center for Southern Illinois and Kansas City Chiefs
- H. R. Baukhage, news broadcaster
- Harry Neal Baum, ad executive, author (born in South Dakota)
- L. Frank Baum, creator of The Wonderful Wizard of Oz, Chicago journalist (born in New York)
- Ross Baumgarten, MLB pitcher 1978–82
- Stan Baumgartner, MLB pitcher 1914–26 (born in Texas)
- Harry Bay, baseball player and bandleader
- Nora Bayes, actress, singer and songwriter, "Shine On, Harvest Moon"
- Rick Bayless, chef and Chicago restaurateur (born in Oklahoma)
- Beverly Bayne, silent-film actress (born in Minnesota)

Be–Bg

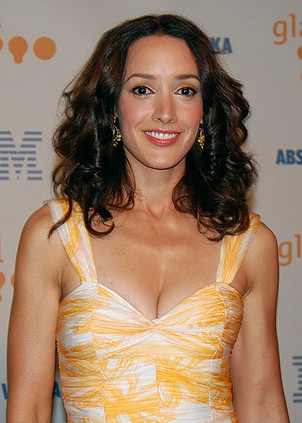
Jennifer Beals

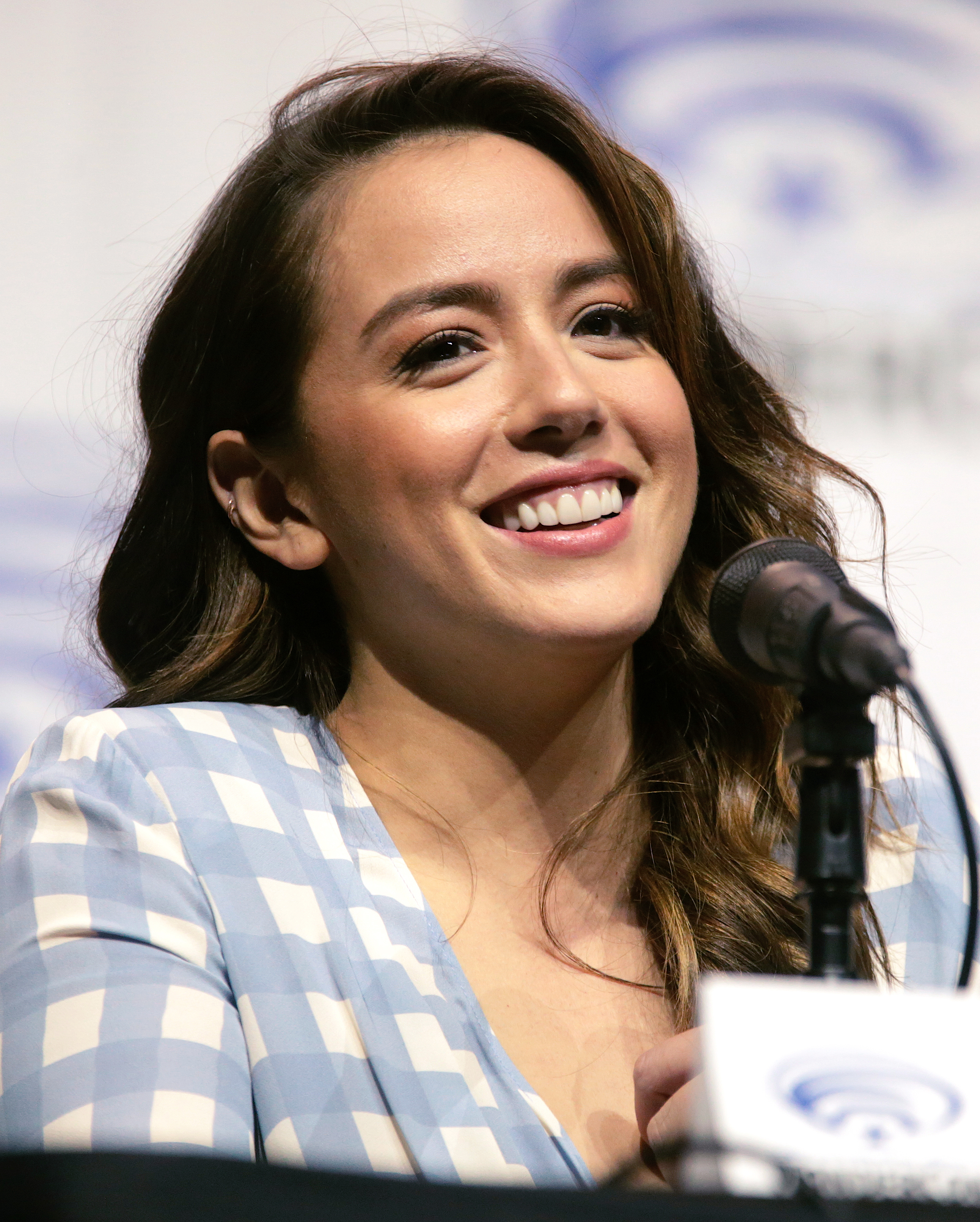
Chloe Bennet

- Brea Beal, three-time Illinois Miss Basketball, 2022 NCAA champion with South Carolina
- Jennifer Beals, actress, Flashdance, The L Word, Devil in a Blue Dress, The Book of Eli
- Harry P. Beam, U.S. representative 1931–42
- Todd Beamer, heroic passenger on United 93 on 9/11 (born in Michigan)
- Melissa Bean, U.S. representative 2005–11
- Arthur M. Beaupre, ambassador
- Warren A. Bechtel, founder of Bechtel
- Boom-Boom Beck, MLB pitcher 1924–45
- Fred Beck, MLB player 1909–15
- John Beck, actor, The Other Side of Midnight, Rollerball, Dallas
- Marilyn Beck, syndicated columnist
- George Becker, labor leader
- Kurt Becker, lineman for Michigan and Chicago Bears
- Rich Becker, MLB outfielder 1993–2000
- Aldo Beckman, journalist for Chicago Tribune
- Arnold Orville Beckman, chemist and inventor
- Robert Todd Lincoln Beckwith, great-grandson of Abraham Lincoln
- Hal Bedsole, tight end, College Football Hall of Fame
- Don Beebe, wide receiver for Buffalo Bills and Super Bowl XXXI champion Green Bay Packers
- Fred Beebe, MLB pitcher (born in Nebraska)
- June Beebe, golfer
- Edward Beecher, theologian and abolitionist (born in New York)
- Chad Beguelin, Broadway lyricist, Aladdin, The Prom
- Ken Behring, real-estate developer, owned NFL's Seattle Seahawks
- Ed Beinor, NFL tackle 1939–42
- Bob Bell, star of Bozo's Circus (born in Michigan)
- Darryl M. Bell, actor, A Different World, Homeboys in Outer Space
- Edward Price Bell, foreign correspondent
- Josh Bell, third baseman for Baltimore Orioles 2010–11
- Lee Phillip Bell, television personality, creator of The Young and the Restless
- Rex Bell, actor, lieutenant governor of Nevada, husband of Clara Bow
- William J. Bell, television producer, creator of The Bold and the Beautiful
- Mal Bellairs, television personality (born in Wyoming)
- Ralph Bellamy, Oscar-nominated actor, His Girl Friday, Sunrise at Campobello, Rosemary's Baby, Trading Places
- Harry Bellaver, actor, Naked City, From Here to Eternity, Love Me or Leave Me
- Dan Bellino, MLB umpire
- Saul Bellow, Nobel Prize and Pulitzer Prize-winning writer, Humboldt's Gift, Seize the Day (born in Canada)
- Louis Bellson, jazz drummer, bandleader and musician
- James Belushi, actor, comedian, According to Jim, Saturday Night Live, Taking Care of Business, K-9
- John Belushi, actor, comedian, Saturday Night Live, Animal House, 1941, The Blues Brothers
- Robert Belushi, actor
- Solon Spencer Beman, architect (born in New York)
- Albert Benbrook, guard for Michigan, member of College Football Hall of Fame (born in Texas)
- Bob Bender, basketball player, Indiana and Duke; head coach, Illinois State, Washington
- Riley A. Bender, politician
- Vincent Hugo Bendix, automotive and aviation pioneer
- Jason Benetti, sportscaster
- Cora Agnes Benneson, attorney, lecturer, and writer
- Chloe Bennet, actress, Agents of S.H.I.E.L.D.
- Beck Bennett, comedian, Saturday Night Live
- Doc Bennett, baseball manager and scout
- Gary Bennett, MLB catcher 1995–2008
- Harve Bennett, producer, The Six Million Dollar Man, Star Trek II: The Wrath of Khan
- John W. F. Bennett, athlete and engineer
- Paris Bennett, singer, American Idol
- Rhona Bennett, singer, En Vogue
- Jack Benny, iconic comedian, radio and TV personality and actor, The Jack Benny Program
- Al Benson, music promoter in Blues Hall of Fame (born in Mississippi)
- Jodi Benson, actress, voice actress, singer, The Little Mermaid
- Jack Berch, singer and radio personality
- Pete Bercich, linebacker for Notre Dame and Minnesota Vikings
- Tom Berenger, Oscar-nominated actor, Platoon, Major League, The Big Chill, Sniper, Inception
- Edgar Bergen, actor and ventriloquist, You Can't Cheat an Honest Man, father of Candice Bergen
- Heinie Berger, MLB pitcher 1907–10
- Norma Berger, pro baseball player
- Wally Berger, MLB outfielder 1930–40, four-time All-Star
- Emily Bergl, actress, Men in Trees, Good Night, Oscar (born in England)
- Dave Bergman, MLB first baseman 1975–92, played for 1984 World Series champion Detroit Tigers
- Sean Bergman, MLB pitcher 1993–2000
- Nate Berkus, designer, television personality
- Shelley Berman, comedian, actor, Curb Your Enthusiasm, The Best Man, Meet the Fockers
- Carlos Bernard, actor, 24
- Dwight Bernard, MLB pitcher 1978–82
- Jason Bernard, actor, All of Me, While You Were Sleeping, Liar Liar
- Ernani Bernardi, musician and politician
- Joseph Bernardin, cardinal archbishop of Archdiocese of Chicago 1982–96
- Edward Bernds, director, Return of the Fly, Queen of Outer Space
- Edward Allen Bernero, TV writer, director, co-creator of Third Watch
- Ken Berry, actor, F Troop, Mayberry, R.F.D., Mama's Family
- Dick Bertell, catcher for Cubs 1960–67
- Marcheline Bertrand, actress, mother of Angelina Jolie
- Jay Berwanger, football star for University of Chicago, first winner of Heisman Trophy (born in Iowa)
- Michael Beschloss, historian and author
- William P. Bettendorf, inventor, Bettendorf, Iowa named for him
- Gary Bettenhausen, auto racer, third place in 1980 Indianapolis 500
- Tony Bettenhausen, auto racer, five top-10 finishes in Indy 500
- Tony Bettenhausen Jr., auto racer, seventh place in 1981 Indy 500
- Tom Bettis, NFL linebacker, coach
- John Lourie Beveridge, Civil War officer and 16th governor of Illinois (born in New York)
- Patrick Beverley, NBA guard
- Kamal Bey, Greco-Roman wrestler, won Junior World Title

Bh–Bm

- Kapri Bibbs, NFL running back
- Bill Bidwill, owner of NFL's Arizona Cardinals 1962–2019
- Charles Bidwill, owner of Chicago Cardinals 1933–47
- Bret Bielema, football coach, Illinois, Arkansas, Wisconsin
- Judy Biggert, U.S. representative 1999–2013
- Michael Bilandic, mayor of Chicago 1976–79, chief justice of Illinois Supreme Court
- Tom Billeter, basketball coach
- George Binks, MLB outfielder 1944–48
- Claude Binyon, journalist, screenwriter and film director
- William Morris Bioff, organized crime figure
- Dick Biondi, radio personality (born in New York)
- Andrew Bird, musician
- Chris Bisaillon, college football player
- Frank Biscan, MLB pitcher 1942–48
- Jerry G. Bishop, radio and TV personality
- Joan Biskupic, journalist and author
- William Bissell, doctor, governor of Illinois 1857–60 (born in New York)
- Uwe Blab, basketball player (born in Germany)
- Black Bart, stagecoach bandit
- Black Beaver, 19th-century scout
- Edwin Black, columnist, author of IBM and the Holocaust
- Black Hawk, Sauk Indian Chief
- John Charles Black, Civil War general, district attorney (born in Mississippi)
- Jordan Black, comedy writer, actor, Halfway Home
- Karen Black, Oscar-nominated actress, The Great Gatsby, Five Easy Pieces, Airport 1975, Family Plot
- Quincy Black, NFL linebacker 2007–12
- Harry Blackmun, Supreme Court justice 1970–94
- Harry Blackstone Sr., stage magician and illusionist
- Timothy Blackstone, railroad mogul, founder of Union Stock Yards, mayor of LaSalle, Illinois
- Ray Blades, MLB outfielder and manager
- Rod Blagojevich, politician (Democrat), governor of Illinois 2003–09, imprisoned in 2012
- Bonnie Blair, speed skater, five-time Winter Olympics gold medalist (born in New York)
- William M. Blair, financier
- Zach Blair, musician, Rise Against
- John Blake, football player and head coach for Oklahoma
- Rosa Blasi, actress, Strong Medicine, Make It or Break It, Hitz
- Neil Blatchford, two-time Olympian speed skater
- Tony Blazine, football player for Illinois Wesleyan and Chicago Cardinals, College Football Hall of Fame
- Tempestt Bledsoe, actress, Vanessa Huxtable on The Cosby Show
- Tyler Blevins, better known as "Ninja", professional gamer, Twitch streamer and YouTuber
- Herbert Blitzstein, organized crime figure
- Robert Bloch, writer, author of Psycho
- John Rusling Block, U.S. secretary of agriculture 1981–86
- Mary A. Blood, co-founder, Columbia College (born in New York)
- Ike Bloom, nightclub owner during Prohibition
- Sol Bloom, impresario, 14-term U.S. representative of New York
- Ossie Bluege, MLB player and manager
- Deborah Blum, journalist and author
- Sidney Blumenthal, journalist, aide to President Bill Clinton
- Jimmy Blythe, musician and composer

Bn–Bo

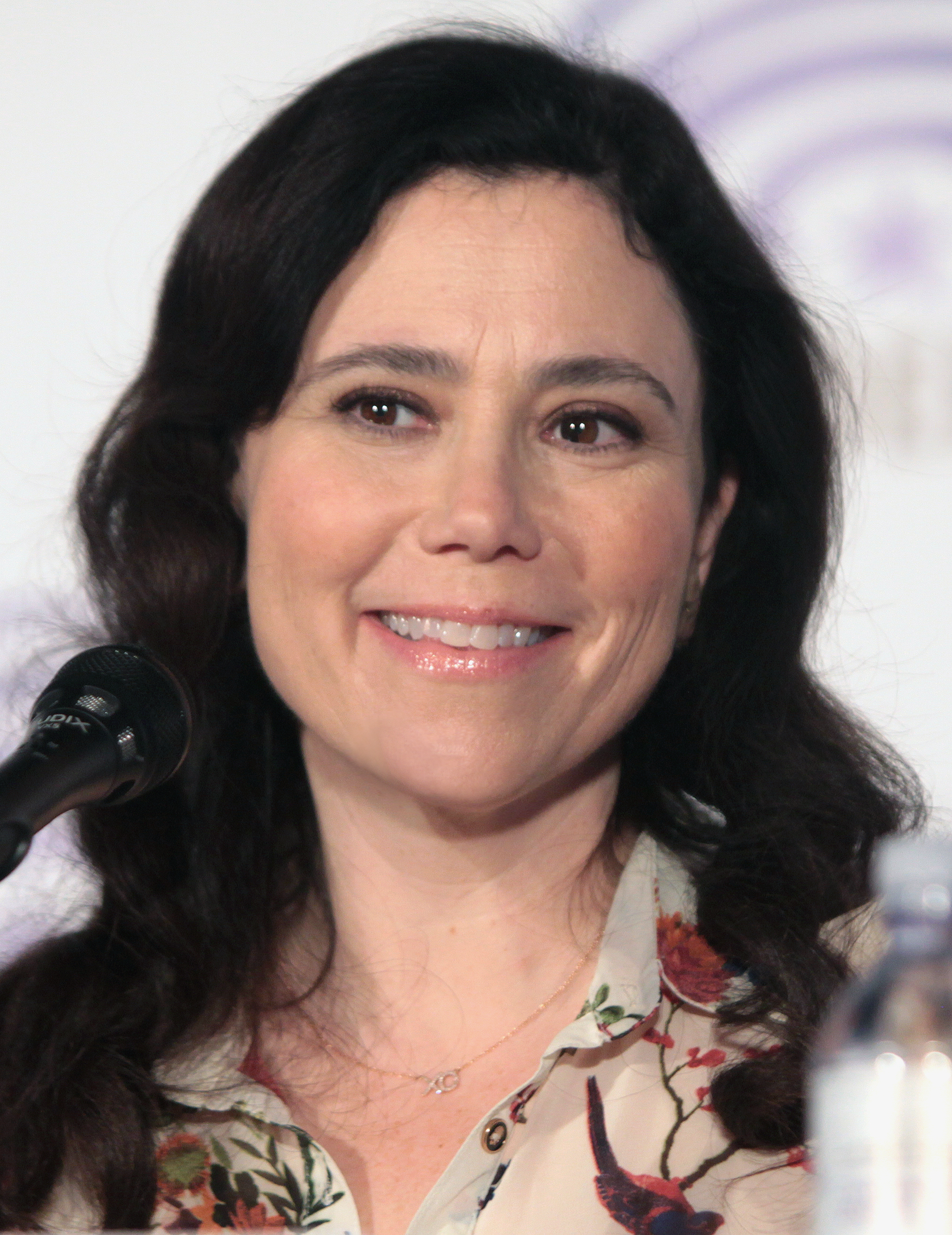
Alex Borstein

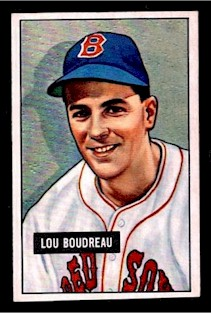
Lou Boudreau

- Harold P. Boas, mathematician
- Michael Boatman, actor, writer, Spin City, China Beach, Arliss
- Ryan Boatright, basketball player
- Nicole Bobek, figure skater, 1995 national champion
- Bucky Bockhorn, basketball player and broadcaster
- Tom Bodett, ad spokesman for Motel 6
- Samuel Bodman, politician (Republican), U.S. secretary of energy 2005–09
- Tom Boerwinkle, center for Chicago Bulls 1968–78, broadcaster (born in Ohio)
- Budd Boetticher, film director, The Tall T, The Killer Is Loose, Seven Men from Now
- Clarence John Boettiger, journalist, son-in-law of FDR
- Tim Bogar, MLB infielder 1993–2001 (born in Indiana)
- Bill Bogash, pioneer of Roller Derby
- Benedict Bogeaus, film producer, Captain Kidd, Dark Waters, The Macomber Affair
- Suzy Bogguss, country singer
- David Boies, attorney
- Bob Boken, MLB infielder 1933–34
- John Boles, MLB manager and executive
- Jared Boll, NHL wing 2007–18 (born in North Carolina)
- Eric Bolling, anchor at Fox Business Network, co-host of The Five
- Don Bollweg, first baseman for 1953 World Series champion Yankees
- Shadrach Bond, first governor of Illinois (born in Maryland)
- Beulah Bondi, Oscar-nominated actress, Mr. Smith Goes to Washington, It's a Wonderful Life (born in Indiana)
- Winifred Bonfils, early 20th-century journalist (born in Wisconsin)
- Mildred A. Bonham, journalist
- Skeeter Bonn, country musician
- Bonnie Lou, singer
- Ron Bontemps, captain of 1952 Olympic gold-medal basketball team
- Ed Boon, creator of Mortal Kombat video game
- Levi Boone, former mayor of Chicago of Know-Nothing Party (born in Kentucky)
- William Borah, 33-year U.S. senator of Idaho
- George Bork, Northern Illinois quarterback, Hall of Fame
- Bruce Borland, golf course designer
- Alex Borstein, actress, Family Guy, The Marvelous Mrs. Maisel
- Tom Bosley, actor, Happy Days, Father Dowling Mysteries, Murder, She Wrote
- Roger Bossard, groundskeeper
- Cathy Boswell, basketball player
- Jim Bottomley, Hall of Fame first baseman, 1928 MVP, two-time World Series champion
- Chesa Boudin, lawyer, district attorney of San Francisco 2020–22 (born in New York)
- Lou Boudreau, Hall of Fame shortstop, manager, broadcaster, 1948 MVP and World Series champion
- Peter Bourjos, MLB outfielder 2010–19
- Mel Bourne, Oscar-nominated art designer
- Dick Boushka, 1956 Olympic basketball gold medalist
- Henry S. Boutell, U.S. representative 1897–1911 (born in Massachusetts)
- Charles Bowden, non-fiction author, journalist, essayist
- Michael Bowden, pitcher for Boston Red Sox 2008–12
- Louise DeKoven Bowen, suffragist, philanthropist
- Matt Bowen, safety for four NFL teams
- Roger Bowen, actor, M*A*S*H, charter member of Second City (born in Rhode Island)
- Jon Bowermaster, adventurer, National Geographic oceans expert
- Ken Bowman, center for Super Bowl I and II champion Green Bay Packers
- Charles Box, first African-American mayor of Rockford
- Bruce Boxleitner, actor, science fiction novelist, Babylon 5, Scarecrow and Mrs. King, the Tron films
- Charles Boyce, syndicated cartoonist (born in Mississippi)
- William D. Boyce, founder of Boy Scouts of America (born in Pennsylvania)
- Guy Boyd, actor, Streamers, Body Double
- William W. Boyington, architect of Chicago Water Tower, mayor of Highland Park (born in Massachusetts)
- Miles Boykin, NFL wide receiver
- Ronnie Boykins, jazz musician
- Lara Flynn Boyle, actress, The Practice, Twin Peaks, The Temp, Men in Black II (born in Iowa)
- Walter J. Boyne, Air Force pilot, author, historian, director of National Air and Space Museum
- Megan Bozek, hockey player, 2014 Winter Olympics silver medalist

Br–Bt

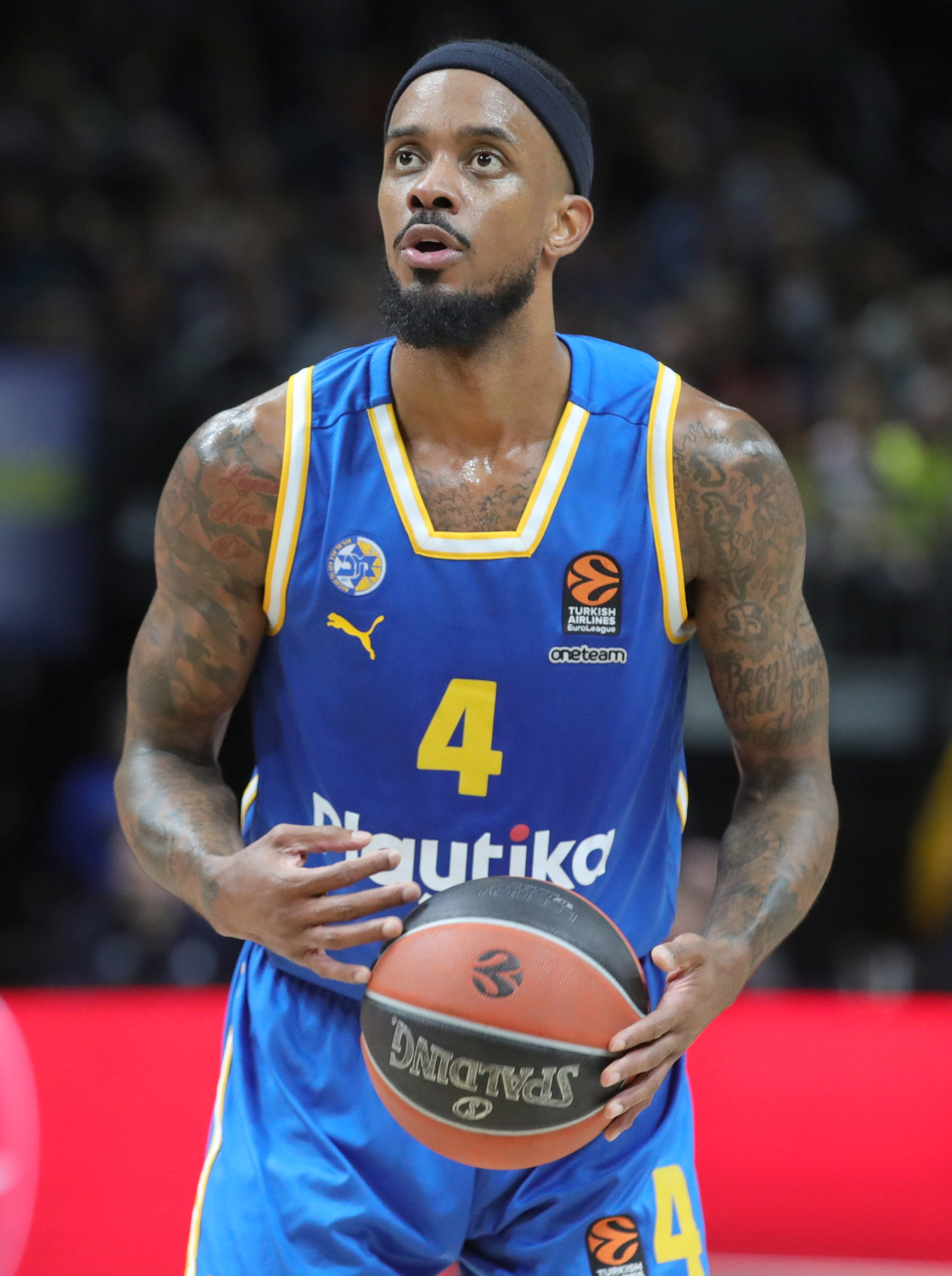
Lorenzo Brown

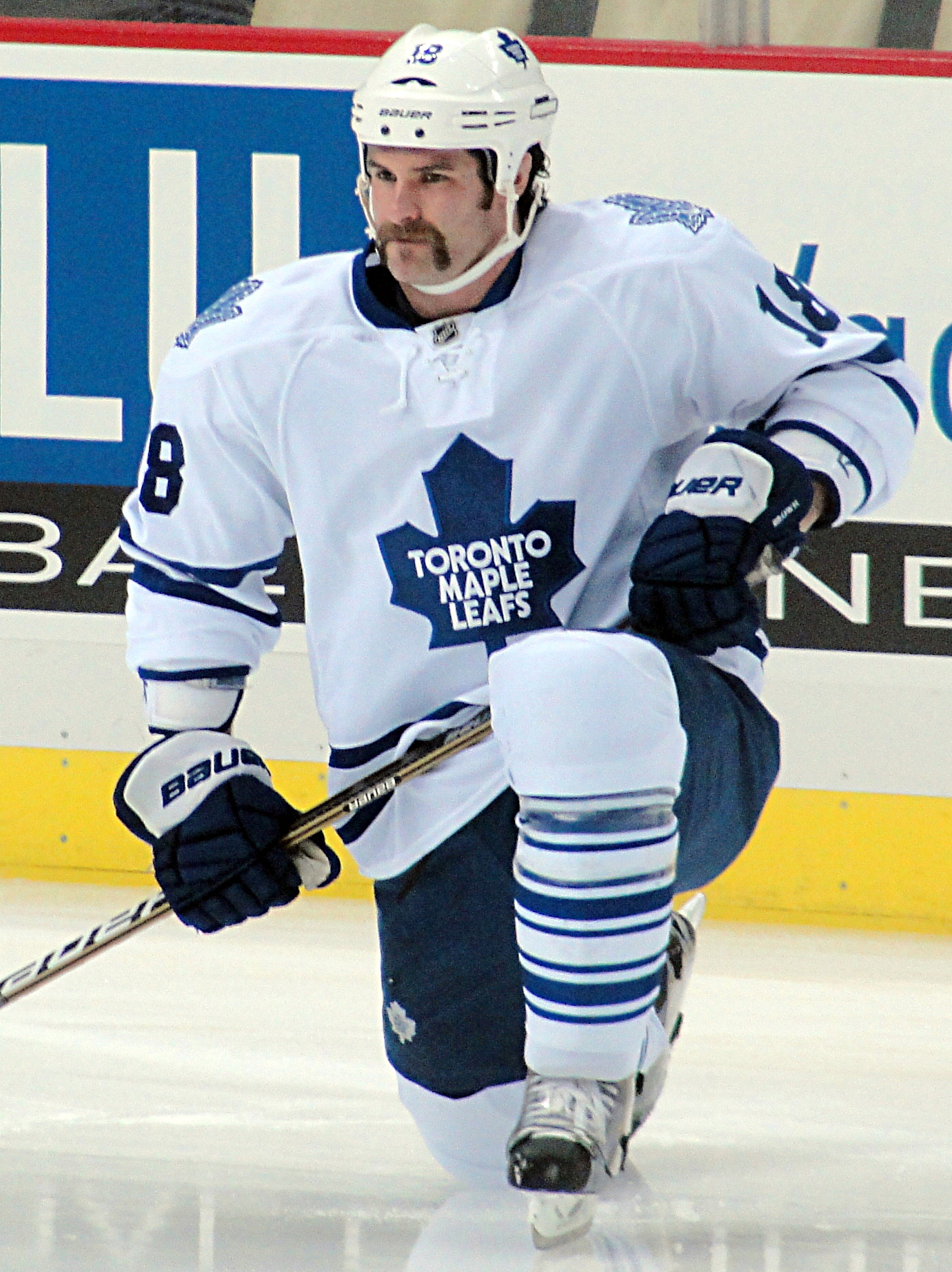
Mike Brown

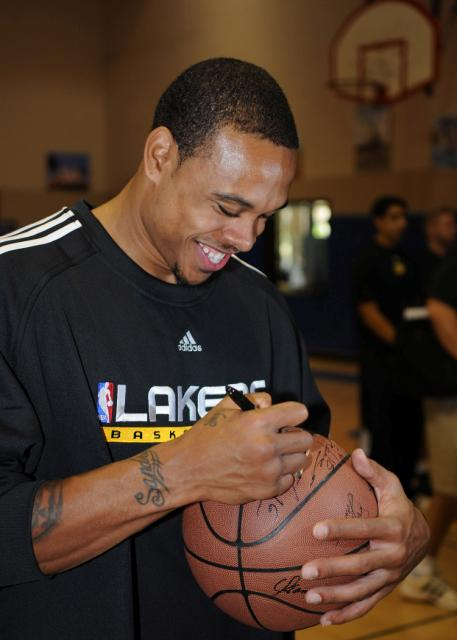
Shannon Brown

- Emil J. Brach, candy mogul
- Helen Brach, candy heiress, presumed murder victim (born in Ohio)
- Ray Bradbury, science-fiction author, Fahrenheit 451, The Illustrated Man, Something Wicked This Way Comes
- Harold Bradley Jr., football player and actor
- Lydia Moss Bradley, philanthropist, founder of Bradley University (born in Indiana)
- Phil Bradley, college football and pro baseball player (born in Indiana)
- Morris Bradshaw, wide receiver for Oakland Raiders 1974–81
- Sufe Bradshaw, actress, Veep
- James B. Bradwell, judge (born in England)
- Myra Bradwell, state's first female lawyer (born in Vermont)
- Ed Brady, linebacker for three NFL teams
- James Brady, advisor and White House press secretary to Ronald Reagan
- Daniel Brainard, surgeon
- Neville Brand, actor, D.O.A., Love Me Tender, The Untouchables, Birdman of Alcatraz
- Mark Staff Brandl, art critic, reviewer for Art in America
- Jonathon Brandmeier, radio personality (born in Wisconsin)
- Marlon Brando, Oscar-winning actor, The Godfather, Last Tango in Paris, Apocalypse Now (born in Nebraska)
- Mac Brandt, actor, Prison Break
- Erik Brann, guitarist with Iron Butterfly
- Hugh Brannum, TV personality, Captain Kangaroo
- Oscar Brashear, jazz musician
- Cameron Brate, tight end for Tampa Bay Buccaneers
- Zeke Bratkowski, NFL quarterback and coach
- Andre Braugher, actor, Homicide: Life on the Street, Hack, Men of a Certain Age, Brooklyn Nine-Nine
- Ben Braun, basketball coach, Rice, Cal, Eastern Michigan
- Carol Moseley Braun, first African-American female U.S. senator
- Tamara Braun, soap opera actress
- Anthony Braxton, jazz musician
- Henry Skillman Breckinridge, attorney in Charles Lindbergh kidnap case, Olympic fencer
- Brent Brede, MLB outfielder 1996–98
- Richard L. Breen, Oscar-winning screenwriter, Titanic, Niagara, PT 109
- Sidney Breese, judge, U.S. senator, advocate of Illinois Central railroad
- Buddy Bregman, music arranger
- Edward A. Brennan, president and CEO of Sears, Roebuck & Co. 1980–95
- Kathleen Brennan, songwriter, producer, wife of Tom Waits
- Josh Brent, nose tackle for Dallas Cowboys
- Jerry Bresler, songwriter, "Five Guys Named Moe"
- Carl Brettschneider, NFL linebacker 1956–63
- Jim Brewer, basketball player, 1972 Olympics and Cleveland Cavaliers
- Ralph Breyer, swimmer, 1924 Olympic gold medalist
- Jack Brickhouse, Hall of Fame baseball broadcaster
- Paul Brickman, writer-director, Risky Business, Men Don't Leave
- Donald Briggs, actor
- Nancy Brinker, ambassador, winner of Presidential Medal of Freedom
- John Briscoe, pitcher for Oakland A's 1991–96
- Nicole Briscoe, sportscaster, Miss Teen Illinois 1998 (born in Wisconsin)
- Frank Brisko, auto racer, 12 times in Indianapolis 500
- Paul Brittain, actor, comedian, cast member on Saturday Night Live
- Frederick A. Britten, 22-year U.S. representative
- David Broder, journalist, author, 1973 Pulitzer Prize-winning Washington Post columnist
- Jayne Brook, actress, Chicago Hope, The District
- Charles W. Brooks, World War I veteran, U.S. senator of Illinois 1940–49
- Gwendolyn Brooks, poet and author (born in Kansas)
- Phil Brooks, professional wrestler and WWE Champion under ring name "CM Punk"
- Rachel Brosnahan, Emmy-winning actress, The Marvelous Mrs. Maisel (born in Wisconsin)
- Maya-Camille Broussard, chef and television personality
- Bill Brown, fullback for Minnesota Vikings, four-time Pro Bowl selection
- Bobbi Brown, CEO of Bobbi Brown Cosmetics
- Buck Brown, cartoonist
- Chelsea Brown, actress, Rowan & Martin's Laugh-In
- Chris Brown, NFL running back 2003–09
- Corwin Brown, defensive back, coach for New England Patriots
- Dee Brown, guard for Illinois 2005 NCAA runners-up, Big Ten Player of the Year
- Dee Brown, author, Bury My Heart at Wounded Knee, librarian and alumnus of Illinois (born in Louisiana)
- Emil Brown, MLB outfielder 1997–2009
- Jason Brown, figure skater, 2015 U.S. champion
- Jesse Brown, U.S. secretary of Veterans' Affairs 1993–97 (born in Michigan)
- Lorenzo Brown, player in Israeli Basketball Premier League
- Mike Brown, NHL wing 2007–16
- Nancy Elizabeth Brown, highly decorated U.S. Navy vice admiral
- Oscar Brown, songwriter
- Patrick Brown, NFL offensive tackle 2009–13
- Peter Brown, songwriter, "Material Girl"
- Roy Brown, children's entertainer, The Bozo Show, Garfield Goose and Friends (born in Arizona)
- Sergio Brown, NFL safety 2010–16
- Shannon Brown, guard for eight NBA teams
- Theotis Brown, NFL running back 1979–83
- Tony Brown, NBA player and coach
- Warren Brown, early 20th-century sportswriter
- Orville Hickman Browning, completed U.S. Senate term of Stephen A. Douglas, U.S. secretary of interior (born in Kentucky)
- David Bruce, actor, The Mad Ghoul, Lady on a Train
- Hank Bruder, NFL guard 1931–39, Green Bay Packers Hall of Fame
- Don Brumm, NFL defensive tackle 1963–72
- Avery Brundage, athlete, decathlon and pentathlon, president of International Olympic Committee 1952–72
- Liz Brunner, television journalist, 1979 Miss Illinois
- Doug Bruno, women's basketball coach, DePaul University, 2012 U.S. Olympic team
- Hal Bruno, political journalist
- Jalen Brunson, NBA player, two-time NCAA champion with Villanova
- Milton Brunson, gospel musician
- Stephen L. Brusatte, paleontologist
- Charles W. Bryan, mayor of Lincoln, Nebraska 1915–17 and two-term governor of Nebraska
- Johnny Bryan, pro football player and team owner
- Mary Baird Bryan, attorney and suffragist
- William Jennings Bryan, politician (Democrat), U.S. secretary of state 1913–15, presidential candidate 1896, 1900, 1908
- Corbin Bryant, NFL player for Buffalo Bills
- Em Bryant, guard for 1969 NBA champion Boston Celtics
- Kelci Bryant, diver, silver medalist at 2012 London Olympics
- Rosalyn Bryant, sprinter, silver medalist at 1976 Summer Olympics
- Bob Bryar, musician, My Chemical Romance drummer

Bu–Bz

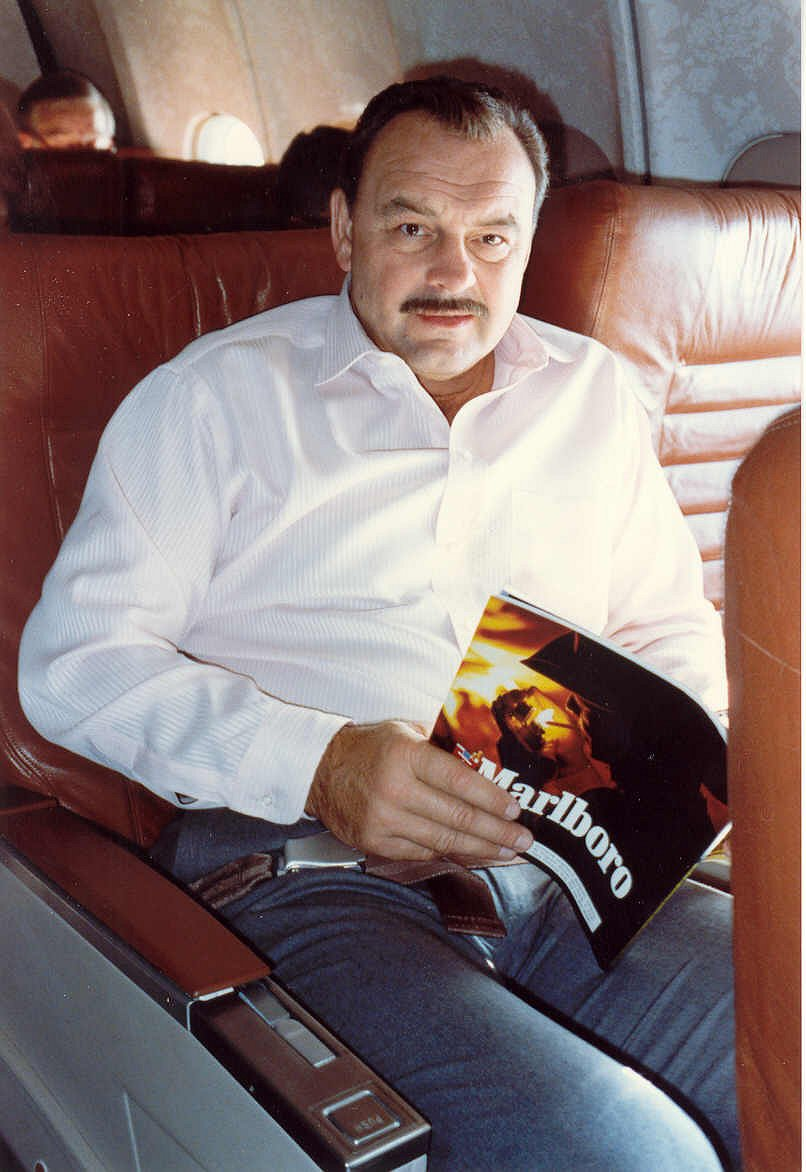
Dick Butkus

- Ray Buchanan, NFL defensive back 1993–2004
- Marisa Buchheit, singer, 2014 Miss Illinois
- Ellsworth B. Buck, U.S. representative 1944–49
- Frank Buck, hunter, zookeeper, actor (born in Texas)
- Bob Buckhorn, mayor of Tampa, Florida 2011–19
- Tom Buckingham, film director
- The Buckinghams, pop group, "Kind of a Drag"
- Quinn Buckner, basketball player, winner of high school, NCAA, Olympic and NBA championships
- John Carl Buechler, horror movie writer/director, special effects artist
- Doug Buffone, linebacker for Chicago Bears, sportscaster (born in Pennsylvania)
- John Buford, Civil War general (born in Kentucky)
- Napoleon Bonaparte Buford, Civil War general (born in Kentucky)
- Kathleen Buhle, executive, ex-wife of Hunter Biden
- Bryan Bulaga, offensive tackle for Green Bay Packers
- Richard Bull, actor, Little House on the Prairie, Voyage to the Bottom of the Sea
- John Whitfield Bunn, financier, treasurer of Abe Lincoln campaign (born in New Jersey)
- Elbridge Ayer Burbank, artist
- Horatio C. Burchard, director of U.S. Mint 1879–85, U.S. representative 1869–79 (born in New York)
- Jacob Burck, cartoonist for Chicago Sun-Times 1938–1982 (born in Poland)
- Nick Burdi, MLB pitcher
- Hannibal Buress, stand-up comedian, actor, The Eric Andre Show, Broad City
- Anne M. Burke, Illinois Supreme Court justice, co-founder of Special Olympics
- Bobby Burke, MLB pitcher 1927–37
- Edward M. Burke, politician (Democrat), Chicago alderman 1969–2023
- Johnny Burke, lyricist in Songwriters Hall of Fame (born in California)
- Kathleen Burke, actress, Island of Lost Souls, The Lives of a Bengal Lancer
- Leo Burnett, advertising executive
- W. R. Burnett, novelist, screenwriter, Little Caesar, Nobody Lives Forever, High Sierra (born in Ohio)
- Smiley Burnette, country singer and musician, Western actor
- Daniel H. Burnham, architect, Chicago city planner (born in New York)
- Ben Burns, newspaper and magazine editor
- Heather Burns, actress, Bored to Death, Miss Congeniality and its sequel
- Ronnie Burns, actor, Burns and Allen
- Pete Burnside, pitcher for six MLB teams
- Hedy Burress, actress, Foxfire, Boston Common
- Roland Burris, U.S. Senate appointee to succeed Barack Obama 2009–10, Illinois attorney general
- Edgar Rice Burroughs, author, creator of Tarzan
- Cheryl Burton, television journalist
- Ed Busch, MLB infielder 1943–45
- Misty Buscher, 57th mayor of Springfield
- Samuel T. Busey, Civil War general, politician (born in Indiana)
- Homer Bush, MLB infielder 1997–2004, member of 1998 World Series champion New York Yankees
- Fred A. Busse, postmaster, mayor of Chicago 1907–11
- Cheri Bustos, U.S. representative 2013–23
- Fanny Butcher, influential critic and editor
- Mike Butcher, MLB pitching coach
- Drew Butera, catcher for 2015 World Series champion Kansas City Royals
- Dick Butkus, Hall of Fame football player for Illinois and Chicago Bears, actor
- Luke Butkus, NFL assistant coach
- Brett Butler, MLB outfielder 1981–97 (born in California)
- Daws Butler, voice of Yogi Bear, other cartoon characters (born in Ohio)
- Jerry Butler, singer in Rock and Roll Hall of Fame
- Michael Butler, theatrical producer
- Paul Butler, polo champion, founder of Oak Brook and Butler National Golf Club
- Robert L. Butler, 50-year mayor of Marion, Illinois
- Paul Butterfield, musician in Blues Hall of Fame and Rock and Roll Hall of Fame
- Dave Butz, defensive lineman for Washington Redskins, St. Louis Cardinals, two-time Super Bowl champion
- Ernie Byfield, hotelier, founder of The Pump Room
- Will Bynum, NBA point guard 2006–15
- John Byrum, screenwriter and director, Heart Beat, Duets, The Razor's Edge
- Tim Byrdak, pitcher for five MLB teams
- Jane Byrne, first female mayor of Chicago
- Jeff Bzdelik, head coach, Denver Nuggets, Air Force, Colorado, Wake Forest

== C ==
Ca–Cd

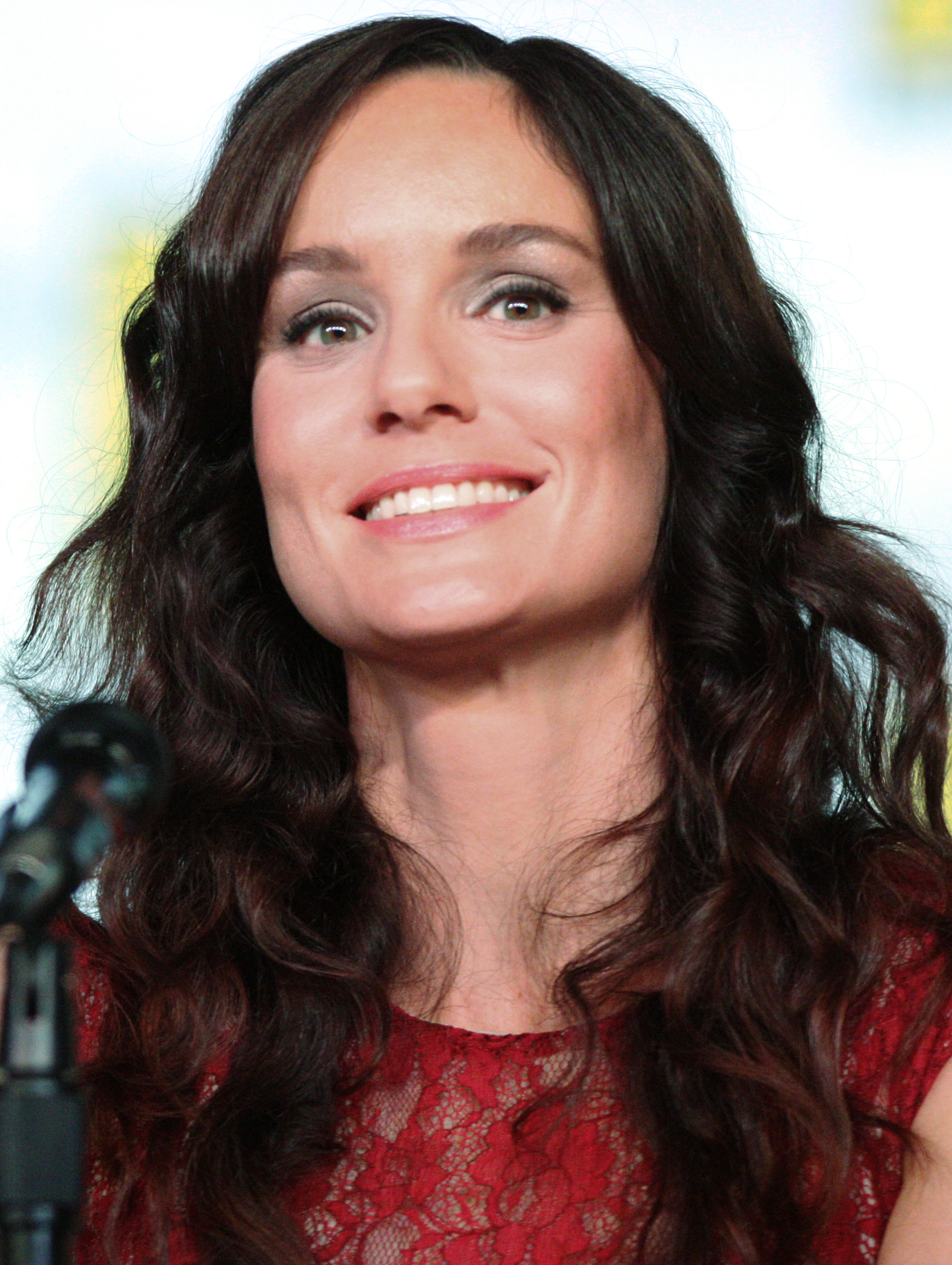
Sarah Wayne Callies

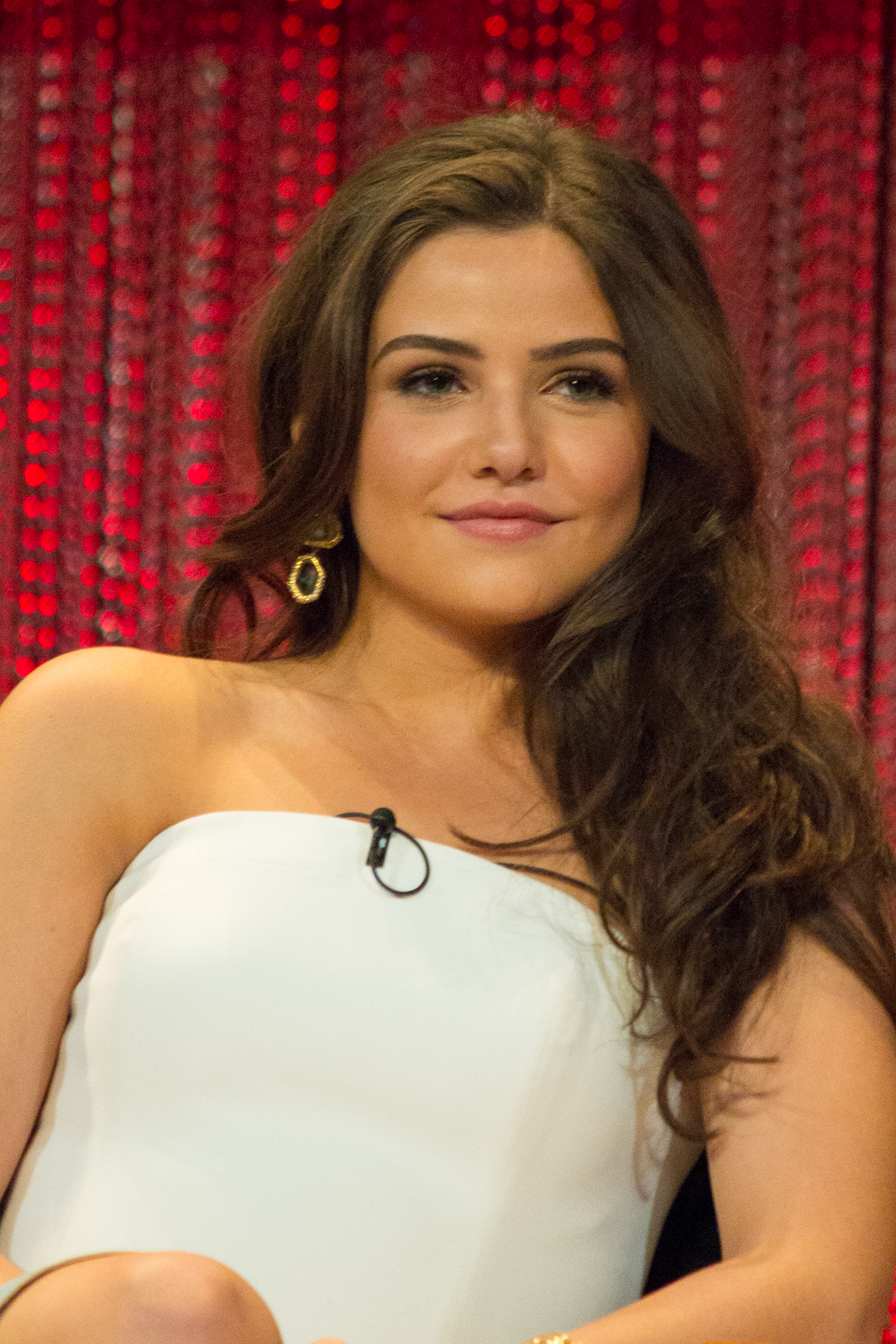
Danielle Campbell

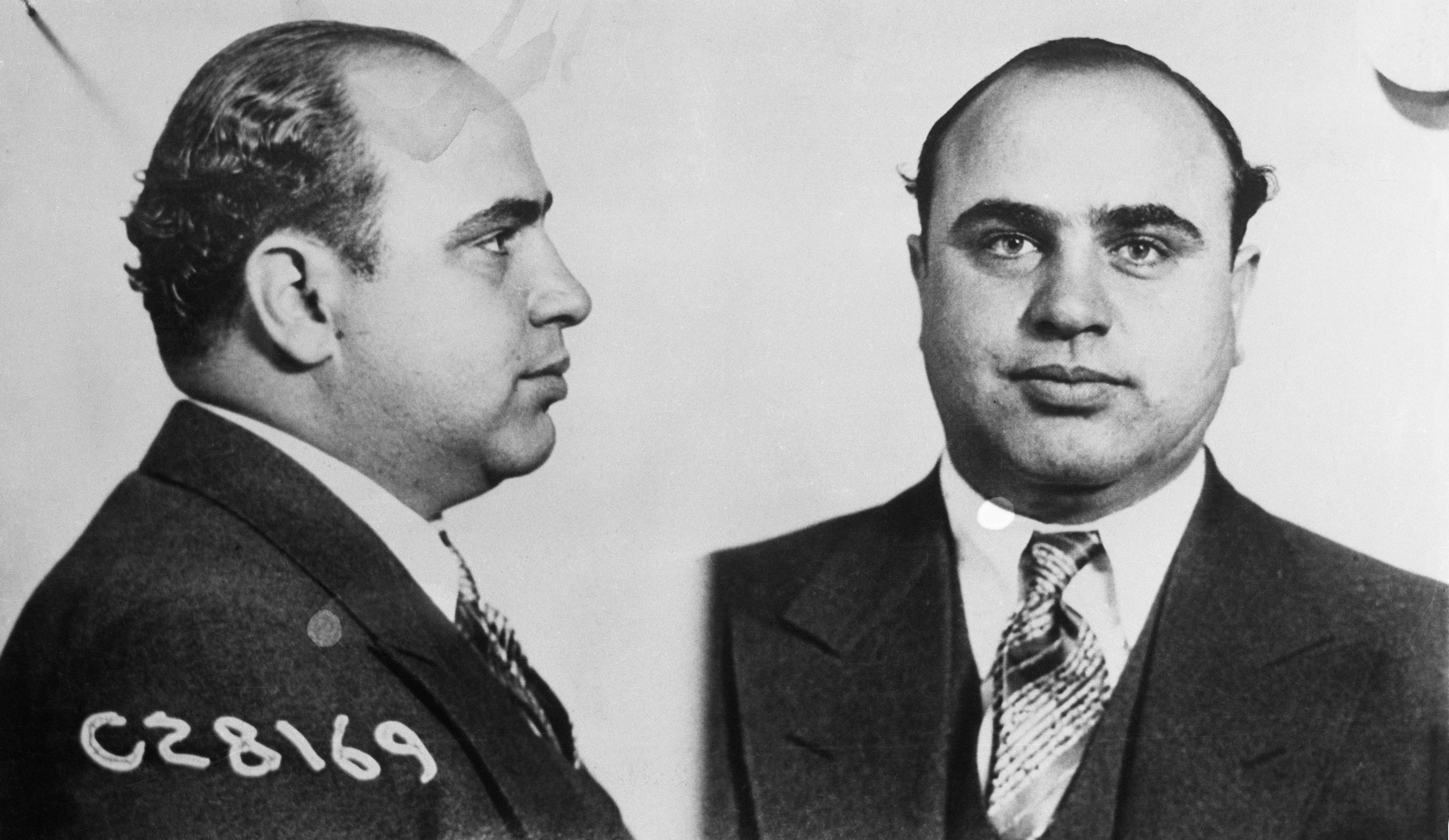
Al Capone

- Frances Xavier Cabrini, nun, missionary, canonized saint (born in Austria)
- Devontae Cacok, Israeli Basketball Premier League and former NBA basketball player
- Leon Cadore, MLB player 1915–24, pitched a record 26 innings in one game
- Calvin Brainerd Cady, musician and professor
- Jack Cafferty, political commentator for CNN 2005–12
- Beth Cahill, comedian
- Leo Cahill, CFL coach and executive
- Jonathan Cain, musician with Rock and Roll Hall of Fame band Journey
- Frank Calabrese Sr., organized crime figure
- Nicholas Calabrese, organized crime figure
- Jessica Calalang, figure skater
- Ben F. Caldwell, banker, U.S. representative 1899–1905
- L. Scott Caldwell, actress, Lost, Queens Supreme
- Corky Calhoun, NBA forward 1972–80
- Frank Caliendo, comedian
- Earnest Elmo Calkins, advertising executive
- Bill Callahan, head coach of Oakland Raiders 2002–03 and Nebraska Cornhuskers 2004–07
- Ann Hampton Callaway, singer and actress
- John Callaway, public television journalist
- Liz Callaway, singer and actress
- Frances Callier, actress, comedian, Hannah Montana
- Sarah Wayne Callies, actress, The Walking Dead, Prison Break, Colony
- Chris Calloway, NFL wide receiver 1990–2000
- George H. Cameron, World War I general
- Julia Cameron, writer, second wife of Martin Scorsese
- Bruce Campbell, MLB outfielder 1930–42
- Danielle Campbell, actress, The Originals, Tell Me a Story
- Heather Anne Campbell, comedian
- Louise Campbell, actress, The Star Maker, Night Club Scandal
- Tom Campbell, U.S. representative in California 1989–2001
- Marvin Camras, inventor
- Larry Canada, NFL running back 1978–81
- Tony Canadeo, halfback for Green Bay Packers 1941–52, Pro Football Hall of Fame
- Vincent Canby, film critic, New York Times
- Glenn Canfield Jr., metallurgist and businessman
- Joe Cannon, politician (Republican), speaker of the House 1903–11 (born in North Carolina)
- Kay Cannon, screenwriter and director, Pitch Perfect, Blockers, Cinderella
- Jim Cantalupo, CEO of McDonald's Corporation 1991–2004
- Shorty Cantlon, runner-up in 1930 Indianapolis 500, killed in 1947 race
- Homaro Cantu, restaurateur (born in Washington)
- Dominique Canty, pro WNBA basketball player
- Al Capone, gangster, bootlegger, boss of Chicago Outfit, subject of Capone, The Untouchables (born in New York)
- Frank Capone, organized crime figure, brother of Al (born in New York)
- John Caponera, comedian, actor, The Good Life
- Antonio "Tony Bananas" Caponigro, consigliere of Angelo Bruno in Philadelphia crime family
- Buzz Capra, MLB pitcher 1971–77
- The Caravans, gospel singers
- Perry Caravello, comedian, skateboarder, star of Windy City Heat
- Harry Caray, Hall of Fame broadcaster for Chicago White Sox and Chicago Cubs (born in Missouri)
- Brian Cardinal, forward for six NBA teams
- Steve Carell, actor and comedian, Second City alumnus (born in Massachusetts)
- Gabe Carimi, All-American and NFL football player
- Thomas Carlin, governor of Illinois 1838–42; Carlinville named for him (born in Kentucky)
- Amy Carlson, actress, Third Watch, Blue Bloods
- Hal Carlson, MLB pitcher 1917–30
- Mark Carlson, MLB umpire
- John P. Carmichael, sportswriter
- Chuck Carney, football and basketball All-American
- Sue Carol, talent agent, wife of Alan Ladd
- J. C. Caroline, halfback for Illinois, defensive back for Chicago Bears
- Ed Carpenter, auto racer, runner-up in 2018 Indianapolis 500, pole sitter 2013, 2014, 2018
- John Alden Carpenter, composer
- Philo Carpenter, pharmacist
- John Carpino, president of MLB's Los Angeles Angels
- Allan Carr, producer, Grease, Saturday Night Fever
- Charmian Carr, actress, The Sound of Music
- Darleen Carr, actress, The Smith Family, The Beguiled
- Marian Carr, actress, San Quentin, Ring of Fear
- Chico Carrasquel, shortstop for White Sox, first Latin starter in All-Star Game (born in Venezuela)
- Mark Carreon, MLB player 1987–96
- Connor Carrick, NHL defenseman
- Janet Carroll, actress, Risky Business, Family Business
- Lucille Carroll, Hollywood studio executive
- Jenny Lou Carson, sharpshooter, country music singer, in Nashville Songwriters Hall of Fame
- Terrence C. Carson, actor, voice actor, Living Single, Star Wars: Clone Wars
- Bryan Carter, musician, 2023 Tony Award winner for Some Like It Hot (born in Missouri)
- Johnny Carter, singer, The Flamingos
- Myra Carter, stage actress
- Maurice Carthon, NFL running back and coach
- James Cartwright, USMC general, vice chairman of the Joint Chiefs of Staff
- Peter Cartwright, revivalist (born in Virginia)
- William Frank Carver, Wild West sharpshooter and showman
- Marty Casey, musician
- Robert J. Casey, decorated soldier and correspondent
- Zadok Casey, founder of Mount Vernon, Illinois, lieutenant governor, U.S. representative (born in Georgia)
- Vera Caspary, author, Laura
- Bill Cassidy, U.S. senator of Louisiana
- Claudia Cassidy, music and drama critic
- Dan Castellaneta, actor, The Simpsons, The Pursuit of Happyness, Happy Feet
- John Castino, MLB infielder 1979–84, 1979 A.L. Rookie of the Year
- Latham Castle, judge, Illinois attorney general 1952–59
- Leonard Caston Jr., musician and songwriter
- Anthony Castonzo, offensive lineman for Indianapolis Colts
- Frank Catalano, saxophonist
- Wayne Catalano, horse racing trainer (born in Louisiana)
- George Catavolos, NFL football coach
- Tamika Catchings, basketball player, winner of NCAA, WNBA and Olympic championships (born in New Jersey)
- Mark Catlin Sr., football coach for Iowa 1906–08
- Helen Tunnicliff Catterall, lawyer, historian
- Phil Cavarretta, player and manager for Chicago Cubs, 1945 National League MVP

Ce–Ch

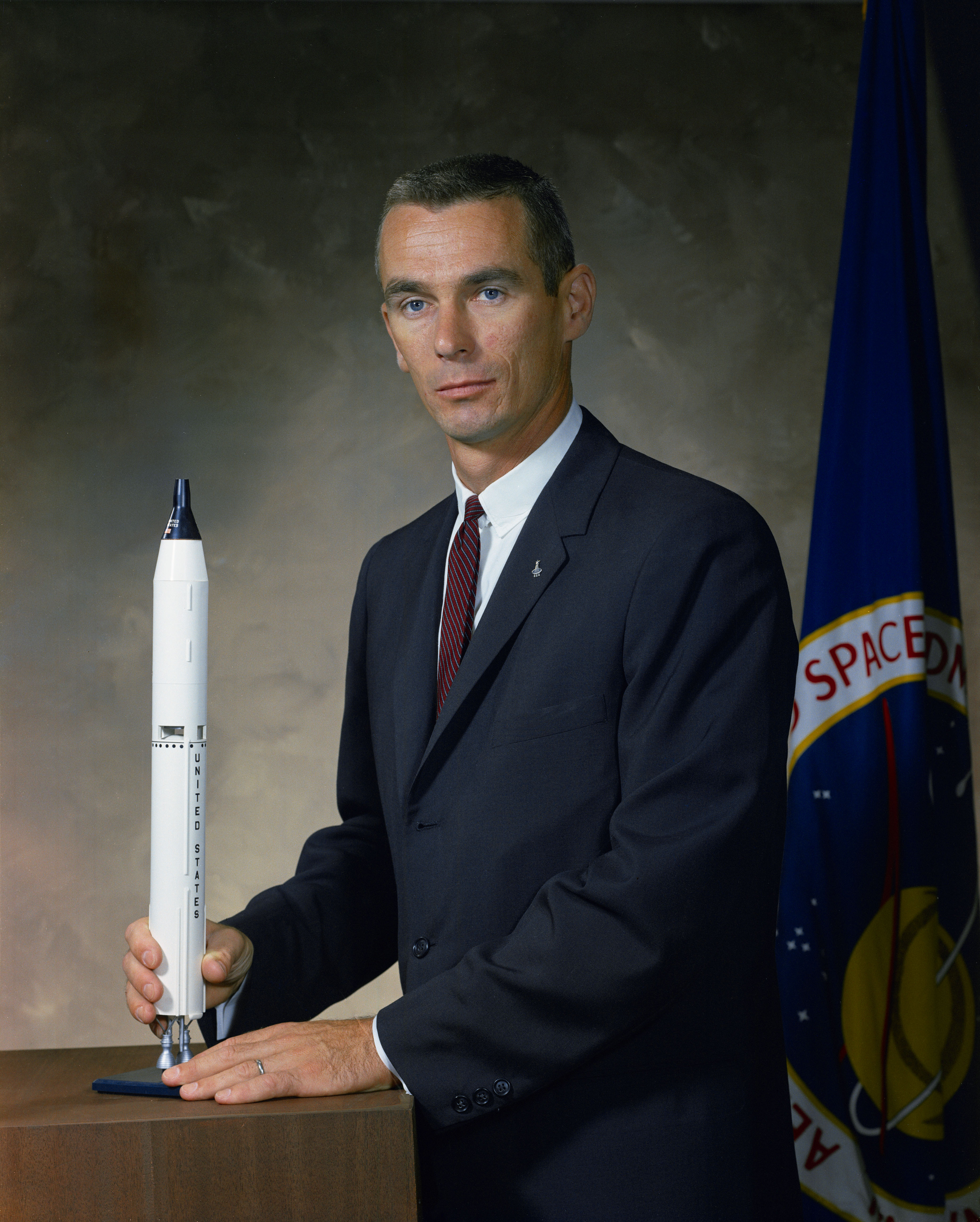
Eugene Cernan

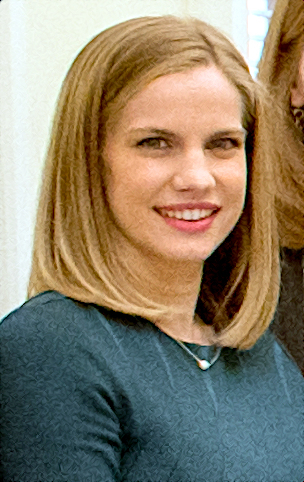
Anna Chlumsky

- Anton Cermak, politician (Democrat), assassinated mayor of Chicago 1931–33 (born in Eastern Europe)
- Eugene Cernan, astronaut, commander of Apollo 17
- JoBe Cerny, actor, voice of Pillsbury Doughboy
- Jackie Cerone, mobster
- Exene Cervenka, singer with punk rock band X
- Peter Cetera, singer and songwriter, "Glory of Love"
- Tom T. Chamales, novelist
- Wes Chamberlain, MLB outfielder 1990–95
- John Chambers, Oscar-winning makeup artist
- Gower Champion, multiple Tony Award-winning dancer, choreographer and actor, Show Boat, Carnival, Hello, Dolly!
- Frank Chance, Hall of Fame first baseman for Cubs (born in California)
- Chance the Rapper, Grammy-winning hip-hop artist
- John Chancellor, television journalist, NBC news anchor
- Bill Chandler, basketball coach for Marquette 1930–51
- Gene Chandler, singer, "The Duke of Earl"
- George Chandler, actor
- Kyle Chandler, Emmy-winning actor, Friday Night Lights, Argo, Carol, The Wolf of Wall Street
- Raymond Chandler, author and screenwriter, The Big Sleep, Double Indemnity, The Long Goodbye, Farewell, My Lovely
- Melanie Chandra, actress, Code Black
- Jay Chandrasekhar, actor, comedian, film director
- Octave Chanute, aviation pioneer
- John Putnam Chapin, mayor of Chicago 1846–47 (born in Vermont)
- Brenda Chapman, animator and film director, The Prince of Egypt, Brave
- Charles Chapman, mayor of Fullerton, California, founder of Chapman College
- Pleasant T. Chapman, educator, lawyer, U.S. representative
- Ray Chapman, infielder for Cleveland Indians 1912–20 (born in Kentucky)
- Joe Charboneau, outfielder with Cleveland Indians 1980–82
- Ezzard Charles, boxing champion (born in Georgia)
- Nick Charles, broadcaster for CNN
- Hobart Chatfield-Taylor, author
- Wayne Chatfield-Taylor, commerce and treasury secretary to FDR
- Cheap Trick, band from Rockford in Rock and Roll Hall of Fame
- Maurice Cheeks, basketball Hall of Famer and NBA coach
- Barry Cheesman, pro golfer
- Chris Chelios, Hall of Fame hockey player for Detroit Red Wings and Chicago Blackhawks
- Erwin Chemerinsky, law professor
- Steve Chen, co-creator of YouTube (born in Taiwan)
- Virginia Cherrill, actress, City Lights, wife of Cary Grant
- Matthew A. Cherry, screenwriter and director
- Steve Cherundolo, head coach, Los Angeles FC soccer club
- Leonard Chess, music executive, founder of Chess Records (born in Poland)
- Lisa Chesson, Olympic hockey player
- Augustus Louis Chetlain, Civil War general (born in Missouri)
- Kelly Cheung, actress, Miss World 2012 contestant (born in Hong Kong)
- Elizabeth Pickett Chevalier, tobacco heiress, silent-film director and writer
- Chicago, musical group, Rock and Roll Hall of Fame
- Judy Chicago, feminist artist and author
- Gery Chico, lawyer, politician, chairman of Illinois State Board of Education
- Brad Childress, head coach of Minnesota Vikings 2006–10
- The Chi-Lites, R & B group, "Have You Seen Her"
- Carl R. Chindblom, Cook County attorney, U.S. representative 1919–33
- Bob Chinn, restaurateur (born in Minnesota)
- Burnett M. Chiperfield, veteran of Spanish–American War, U.S. representative
- Robert B. Chiperfield, veteran of World War I, U.S. representative
- Harry Chiti, catcher for four MLB teams
- Whitney Chitwood, stand-up comedian
- Kim Chizevsky-Nicholls, IFBB pro bodybuilder
- Anna Chlumsky, actress, My Girl, Veep, Inventing Anna
- Clyde L. Choate, politician, World War II Medal of Honor recipient
- Kenneth Choi, actor, Sons of Anarchy, The Wolf of Wall Street
- Richard Christiansen, Chicago theater critic
- Greta Christina, atheist blogger, speaker, and author
- William Christopher, actor, M*A*S*H
- June Christy, big-band singer
- Amy Chua, professor at Yale Law School, author of World on Fire
- Marguerite S. Church, psychologist, six-term U.S. representative, widow of Ralph Church
- Ralph E. Church, lawyer, U.S. representative 1935–49

Ci–Cn

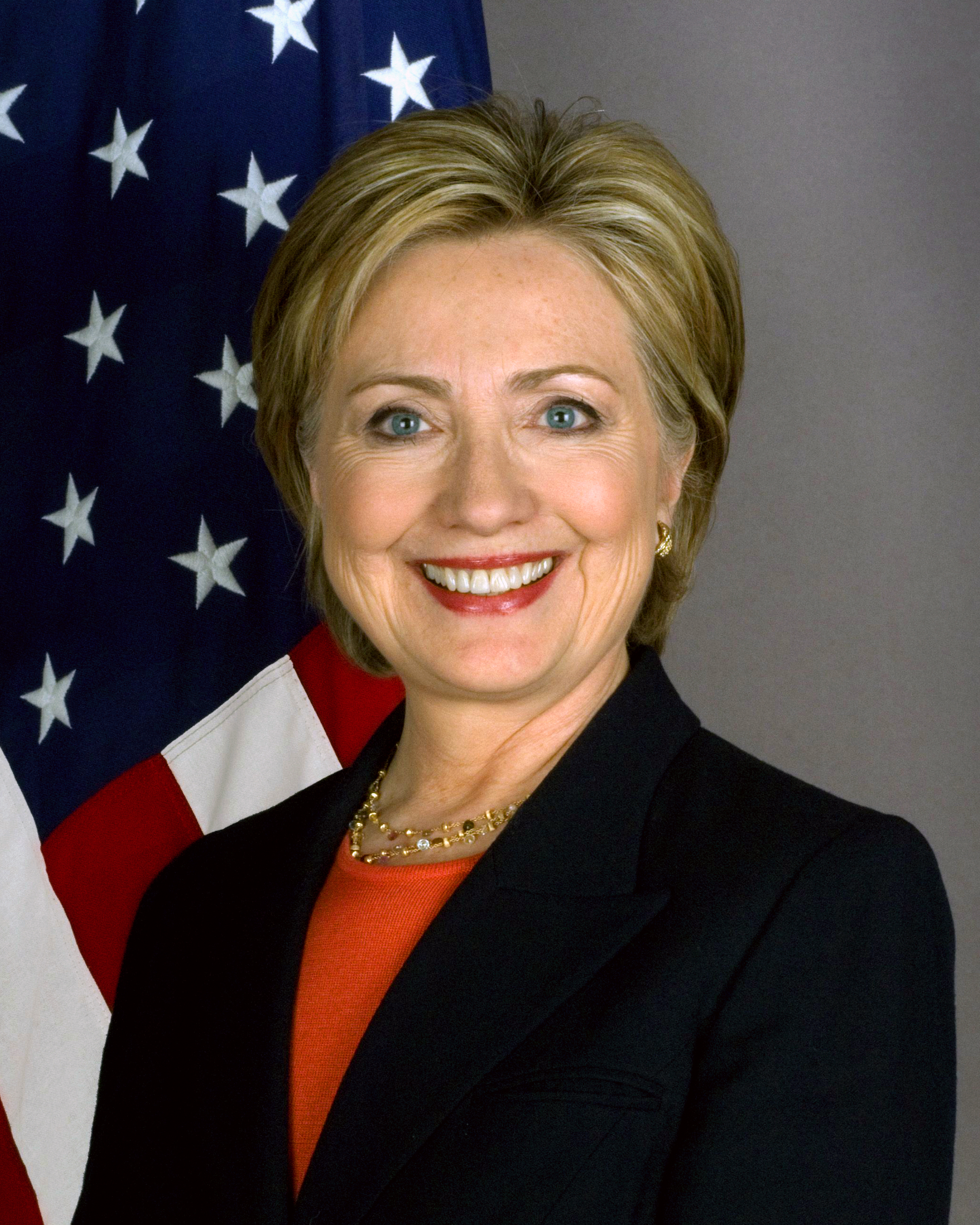
Hillary Clinton

- Tony Cingrani, MLB pitcher 2012–18
- Gertrude Claire, silent-film actress
- Bud Clancy, MLB first baseman 1924–34
- Jim Clancy, pitcher for Toronto Blue Jays and Houston Astros
- Richard Clarida, economist, vice chair of the Federal Reserve 2018–22
- Bridgetta Clark, silent-film actress
- Colbert Clark, screenwriter and director
- Danny Clark, linebacker for five NFL teams
- Dee Clark, singer, "Raindrops"
- George Clark, football coach, Kansas State, Nebraska
- Keon Clark, NBA player 1998–2004
- Mark Clark, pitcher for five MLB teams
- Mark W. Clark, World War II general (born in South Carolina)
- Randy Clark, NFL lineman 1980–87
- Wesley Clark, U.S. Army general, Presidential Medal of Freedom recipient, 2004 presidential candidate
- Wilbur Clark, original owner of Desert Inn hotel in Las Vegas
- Alden W. Clausen, president of World Bank and Bank of America
- Otis Clay, musician in Blues Hall of Fame
- Ethel Clayton, early 20th-century actress
- David Clennon, actor, The Thing, Star 80, Being There
- James Cleveland, Grammy-winning gospel singer
- Nathaniel Clifton, player for New York Knicks, Harlem Globetrotters
- Hillary Clinton, attorney and politician, First Lady (1993–2000), U.S. senator of New York (2000–2009) and U.S. secretary of state; 2016 Democratic presidential nominee
- William H. Clothier, Oscar-nominated cinematographer

Coa–Com

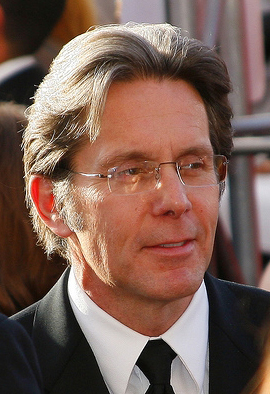
Gary Cole

- Ed Coady, quarterback of first Notre Dame victory, 1888
- Pat Coady, Notre Dame quarterback, 1892
- Henry Ives Cobb Jr., artist and architect
- Junie Cobb, musician and bandleader (born in Arkansas)
- Silas B. Cobb, industrialist (born in Vermont)
- Ali Cobrin, actress, American Reunion, Lap Dance, The Baxters
- Annie Swan Coburn, art collector
- Catherine Amanda Coburn, journalist, editor
- Diablo Cody, Oscar-winning screenwriter, Juno
- Eleanor Coen, artist
- Ryan Cohan, jazz pianist
- Aaron Cohen, judoka
- Irwin Cohen, Olympic judoka
- Paul Cohen, music producer
- Selma Jeanne Cohen, dance teacher, historian
- Steve Cohen, Olympic judoka
- David Cohn, American-Israeli basketball player
- Sonny Cohn, trumpeter
- Mark Cohon, commissioner of Canadian Football League 2007–15
- Bryan Colangelo, NBA executive
- Jerry Colangelo, chairman of USA Basketball, owned Arizona Diamondbacks and Phoenix Suns
- Stephen Colbert, comedian, alumnus of Northwestern and Second City (born in Washington, D.C.)
- Freddy Cole, jazz musician, brother of Nat King Cole
- Gary Cole, actor, The Brady Bunch Movie, Office Space, Midnight Caller, Fatal Vision, NCIS
- Ike Cole, jazz musician, brother of Nat King Cole
- James M. Cole, U.S. deputy attorney general under President Barack Obama
- Nat King Cole, singer, musician and actor, Grammy Lifetime Achievement Award (born in Alabama)
- Robert MacFarlan Cole III, chemical engineer, inventor, and author
- Bessie Coleman, aviator
- Ellis Coleman, Greco-Roman wrestler
- Gary Coleman, actor, Arnold Jackson on Diff'rent Strokes
- Gerald Coleman, NHL ice hockey goalie
- John Coleman, TV weather forecaster (born in Texas)
- Tevin Coleman, running back for Atlanta Falcons (born in Georgia)
- Edward Coles, secretary to James Madison, second governor of Illinois (born in Virginia)
- Michael Colgrass, winner of 1978 Pulitzer Prize for music
- Ned Colletti, general manager for Los Angeles Dodgers 2006–14
- Harold R. Collier, mayor of Berwyn, 18-year U.S. representative
- Joe Collier, wide receiver for Northwestern and NFL coach
- Lou Collier, MLB player 1997–2004
- Bob Collins, radio personality (born in Florida)
- Cardiss Collins, politician (Democrat), U.S. representative 1973–97 (born in Missouri)
- Chris Collins, basketball head coach for Northwestern
- Doug Collins, NBA and Olympic basketball player, head coach of four NBA teams, TV commentator
- Eddie Collins, Hall of Fame infielder, manager for White Sox (born in New York)
- George W. Collins, U.S. representative 1970–72
- Jimmy Collins, NBA player for Chicago Bulls, head coach at Chicago State 1996–2010 (born in New York)
- Julia Collins, 20-time winner on TV's Jeopardy!
- Kreigh Collins, tennis player, 1899 US Open semi-finalist
- Marva Collins, educator (born in Alabama)
- Phil Collins, pitcher for three MLB teams
- Sherron Collins, NBA point guard
- James Colosimo, organized crime figure
- George Radcliffe Colton, U.S. representative from Nebraska, governor of Puerto Rico
- Harvey Doolittle Colvin, city treasurer, mayor of Chicago 1873–75 (born in New York)
- Ruth Johnson Colvin, literacy activist, Presidential Medal of Freedom
- Shawn Colvin, Grammy-winning singer and songwriter (born in South Dakota)
- Harry Combes, 20-year head basketball coach at Illinois
- Charles Comiskey, founding owner of Chicago White Sox, member of baseball Hall of Fame
- Chuck Comiskey, owner of White Sox 1956–61
- Grace Comiskey, owner of White Sox 1939–56
- J. Louis Comiskey, owner of White Sox 1931–39
- Common, Oscar, Emmy and Grammy-winning rap musician, songwriter, producer, actor
- J. T. Compher, NHL center, 2022 Stanley Cup champion with Colorado Avalanche
- Ann Compton, television journalist

Con–Coz

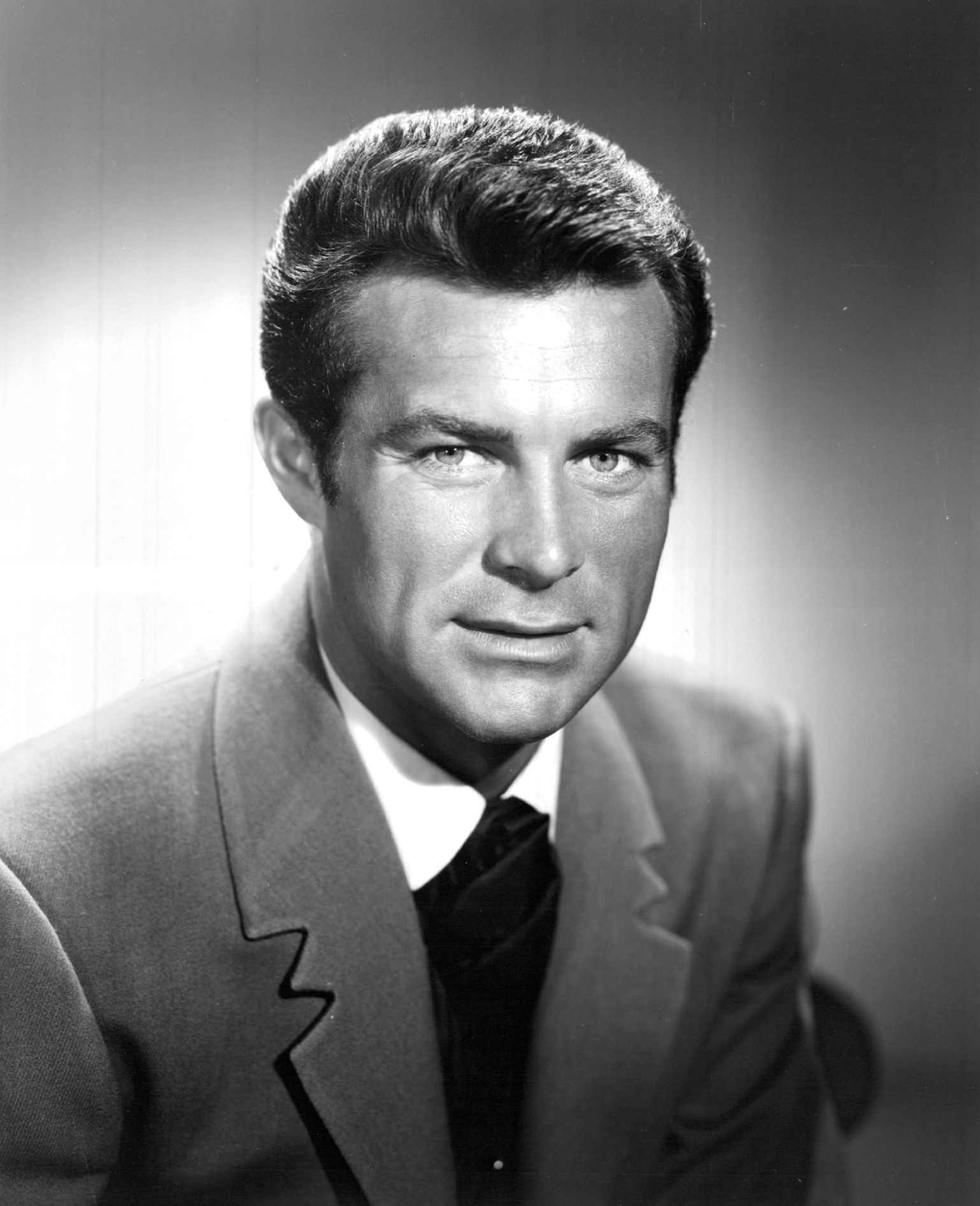
Robert Conrad

- Douglas Conant, CEO of the Campbell's
- Kate Condon, opera singer
- Zez Confrey, musician
- Edwin H. Conger, ambassador, congressman, Civil War officer
- Jocko Conlan, Hall of Fame baseball umpire
- Darlene Conley, actress, The Bold and the Beautiful
- Mike Conley Sr., athlete, gold medalist, triple jump, 1992 Barcelona Olympics
- Bart Conner, gymnast, gold medalist, parallel bars, 1984 Los Angeles Olympics
- Mike Connolly, gossip columnist
- George Connor, Hall of Fame offensive tackle and linebacker for Chicago Bears
- Jimmy Connors, tennis player, five-time US Open champion, twice Wimbledon champion, ranked No. 1 in world
- Robert Conrad, actor, Hawaiian Eye, The Wild Wild West, Baa Baa Black Sheep, Palm Springs Weekend
- Bill Conroy, MLB catcher 1935–44
- Donald Conroy, Marine colonel, father of Pat Conroy
- Sean Considine, safety for five NFL teams
- Hollis Conway, high jumper, two-time Olympic medalist
- Brian Cook, forward for Illinois and five NBA teams, 2003 Big Ten Player of the Year
- Daniel Pope Cook, lawyer, publisher, state's first attorney general; Cook County named for him (born in Kentucky)
- Elisha Cook Jr., character actor, The Maltese Falcon, Shane, The Killing, The Big Sleep
- John Pope Cook, Civil War general, mayor of Springfield
- Toi Cook, NFL defensive back 1987–97, played for Super Bowl XXIX champion San Francisco 49ers
- Sam Cooke, singer, "You Send Me", recipient of Grammy Lifetime Achievement Award (born in Mississippi)
- William F. Coolbaugh, 19th-century banker (born in Pennsylvania)
- Jack Cooley, pro and Notre Dame basketball player
- Ron Coomer, infielder for Minnesota Twins, sportscaster
- Sam Coonrod, MLB pitcher
- Cynthia Cooper, Hall of Fame basketball player and coach, four-time WNBA champion
- D. J. Cooper, player in Israeli Basketball Premier League
- Jerome Cooper, drummer
- Job Adams Cooper, governor of Colorado 1889–91
- Martin Cooper, inventor of modern cell phone
- Maxine Cooper, actress, Kiss Me Deadly
- Wyllis Cooper, radio writer, screenwriter
- Ira C. Copley, publisher, U.S. representative 1911–23
- Chet Coppock, sportscaster
- Ben Corbett, film actor
- George Corbett, running back for Chicago Bears 1932–38
- Virginia Lee Corbin, actress (born in Arizona)
- Tom Corcoran, politician (Republican), four-term U.S. representative
- Kevin Cordes, NCAA champion swimmer
- Billy Corgan, musician for alternative rock band Smashing Pumpkins
- Bartlett Cormack, playwright and screenwriter
- Jim Cornelison, tenor, anthem singer
- Don Cornelius, television host, producer, creator of Soul Train
- Lillian Cornell, singer and actress
- Frank Cornish, NFL lineman 1990–95
- Frank J. Corr, alderman, acting mayor of Chicago, 1933
- Charles Correll, co-creator and star of Amos 'n' Andy
- Lee Corso, football coach, Indiana, Louisville, sportscaster for ESPN
- Eldzier Cortor, artist (born in Virginia)
- Joe Corvo, NHL player 2002–14
- Dave Corzine, center for DePaul and Chicago Bulls
- Jon Corzine, CEO of Goldman Sachs, U.S. senator of New Jersey 2001–06, governor 2006–10
- Pete Cosey, guitarist for Miles Davis
- Jerry F. Costello, politician (Democrat), U.S. representative 1988–2013
- Neal Cotts, pitcher for 2005 World Series champion White Sox
- John Coughlin, politician (Democrat), Chicago alderman 1893–1938
- John Coughlin, television meteorologist
- Johnny Coulon, boxer, bantamweight champion 1910–14 (born in Canada)
- Jim Courtright, Wild West gunfighter, lawman
- Kirk Cousins, quarterback for Minnesota Vikings, Atlanta Falcons
- Robert Covington, NBA forward
- Bryan Cox, linebacker for Miami Dolphins and Super Bowl XXXVI champion New England Patriots
- Jim Cox, MLB player 1973–76
- John H. Cox, businessman, politician
- Sonny Cox, musician, coach (born in Ohio)
- Wally Cox, actor, Mister Peepers, Underdog (born in Michigan)
- Dale Coyne, auto racing driver and executive
- Kendall Coyne, hockey player, silver medalist at 2014 Winter Olympics
- Chief Keef (Keith Cozart), rapper, singer, songwriter and record producer
- James Gould Cozzens, novelist, By Love Possessed

Cr–Cz

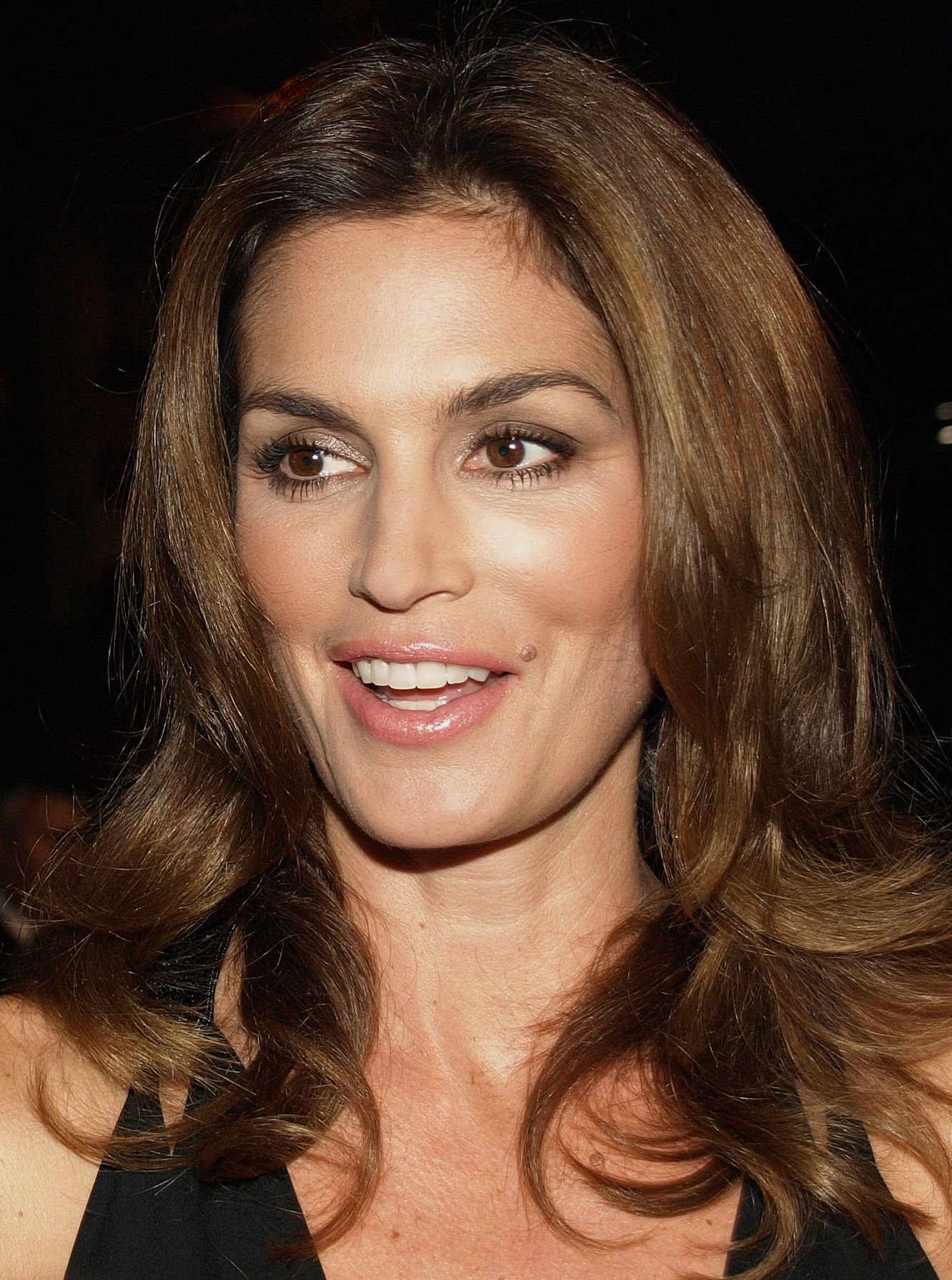
Cindy Crawford

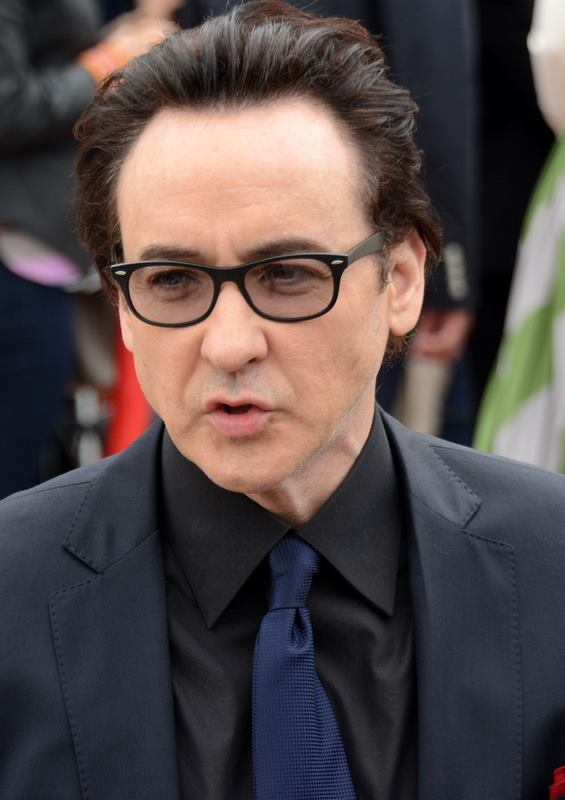
John Cusack

- Wallace Craig, experimental psychologist, behavior scientist (born in Canada)
- Yvonne Craig, actress, Batman, Kissin' Cousins
- Dan Crane, dentist, politician (Republican), U.S. representative 1979–85
- Phil Crane, politician (Republican), U.S. representative 1969–2005
- Cindy Crawford, supermodel, cosmetics entrepreneur, actress and TV personality, House of Style
- Corey Crawford, goaltender for Chicago Blackhawks 2006–20, two-time Stanley Cup champion (born in Canada)
- Danny Crawford, NBA referee
- Drew Crawford, basketball player in the Israeli Basketball Premier League
- Ellen Crawford, actress, ER
- Jim Crawford, MLB pitcher 1973–78
- Oliver Crawford, blacklisted screenwriter
- Dewitt Clinton Cregier, engineer, mason, mayor of Chicago 1889–91 (born in New York)
- John Crerar, industrialist, railroad director (born in New York)
- Jim Crews, basketball player for 1976 NCAA champion Indiana, head coach for Evansville, Army, St. Louis
- Michael Crichton, author, screenwriter, director, Jurassic Park, ER, Westworld, Rising Sun, Coma, Disclosure
- Michele Crider, opera singer
- Fritz Crisler, football head coach for Michigan, Minnesota, Princeton
- John P. Cromwell, submarine commander
- James Cronin, physicist, 1980 Nobel Prize
- Kevin Cronin, lead vocalist for REO Speedwagon
- Shawn Cronin, NHL defenseman 1988–95
- Casey Crosby, pitcher for Detroit Tigers 2012
- Jim Crowley, halfback for Notre Dame, NFL player, Michigan State coach, College Football Hall of Fame
- Henry Crown, businessman, philanthropist
- Lester Crown, businessman, philanthropist
- Arthur Crudup, musician, "That's All Right" (born in Mississippi)
- Dave Cruikshank, speed skater, four-time Olympian
- The Cryan' Shames, rock band
- Bob Cryder, NFL guard 1978–86
- Walt Cudzik, NFL center 1954–64
- Melinda Culea, actress, Brotherly Love, Knots Landing, The A-Team
- John Cullerton, politician
- William J. Cullerton, decorated World War II pilot
- Philip Hart Cullom, admiral
- Shelby Moore Cullom, lawyer, governor of Illinois 1877–1883, U.S. senator 1883–1913 (born in Kentucky)
- Edith Cummings, golfer, 1923 U.S. Women's Amateur champion
- Terry Cummings, player for DePaul and seven NBA teams, 1983 NBA Rookie of the Year
- Lester Cuneo, silent-film actor
- Barbara Flynn Currie, politician (Democrat), state representative 1979–2019
- Betty Currie, personal secretary to President Bill Clinton
- Adrianne Curry, model and America's Next Top Model winner
- Eddy Curry, center for four NBA teams, fourth pick of 2001 NBA draft
- Alan Curtis, actor, High Sierra, Buck Privates
- Charlotte Curtis, journalist, New York Times
- James Curtiss, mayor of Chicago 1847–51 (born in Connecticut)
- Mary Curzon, baroness
- Ann Cusack, actress, The Jeff Foxworthy Show, Maggie
- Joan Cusack, actress, Working Girl, In & Out, Broadcast News, School of Rock, Toys, Toy Story 2, Shameless
- John Cusack, actor, Eight Men Out, Con Air, High Fidelity, The Grifters, Grosse Pointe Blank, 1408, 2012
- Matt Cushing, NFL tight end 1999–2004
- Clive Cussler, best-selling novelist, Raise the Titanic!, Sahara, creator of Dirk Pitt
- Ethan Cutkosky, actor, Shameless
- Slade Cutter, decorated World War II submarine officer
- Mike Cvengros, MLB pitcher 1922–29
- Ziggy Czarobski, Hall of Fame tackle for Notre Dame

== D ==
Da–Dd

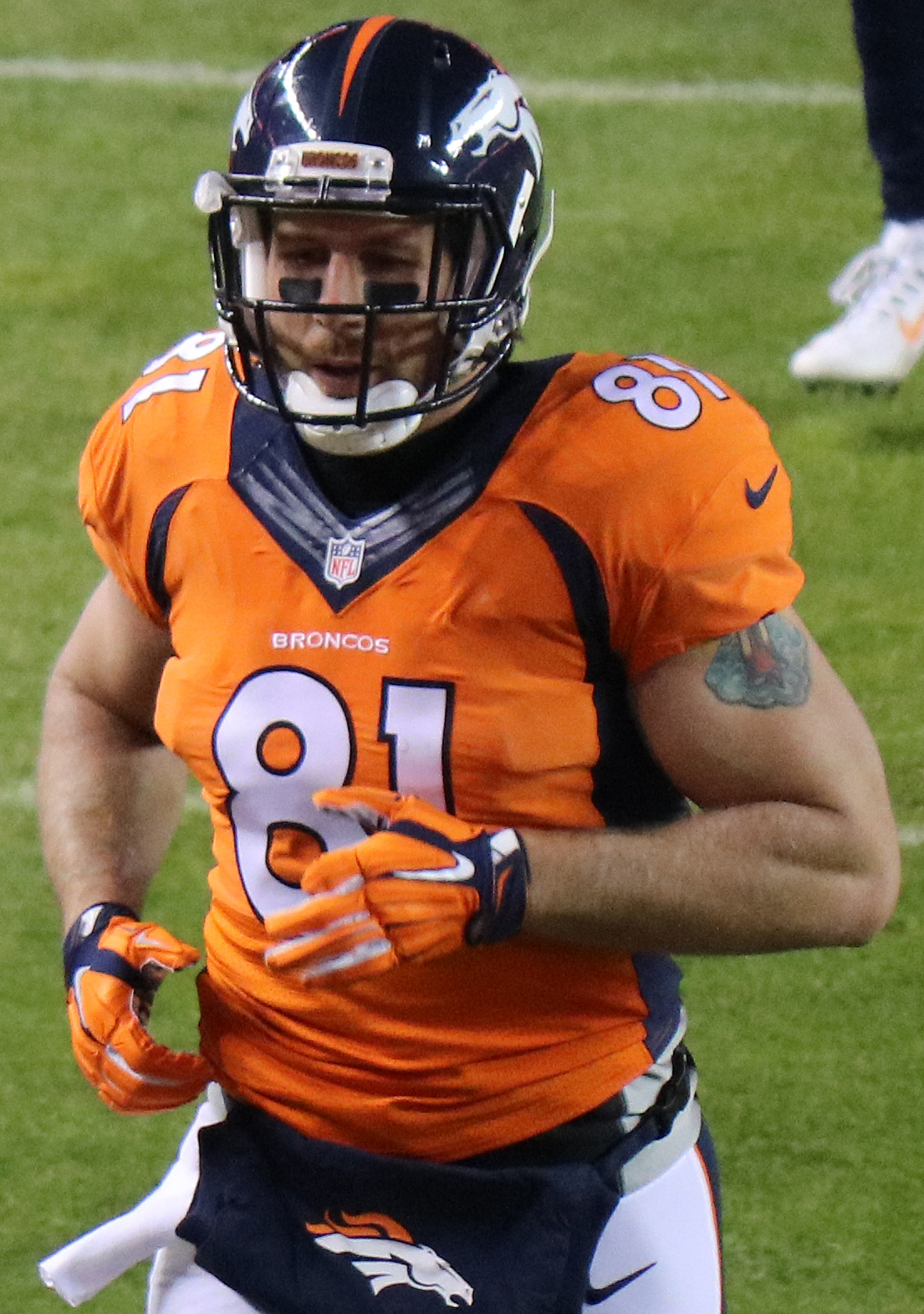
Owen Daniels

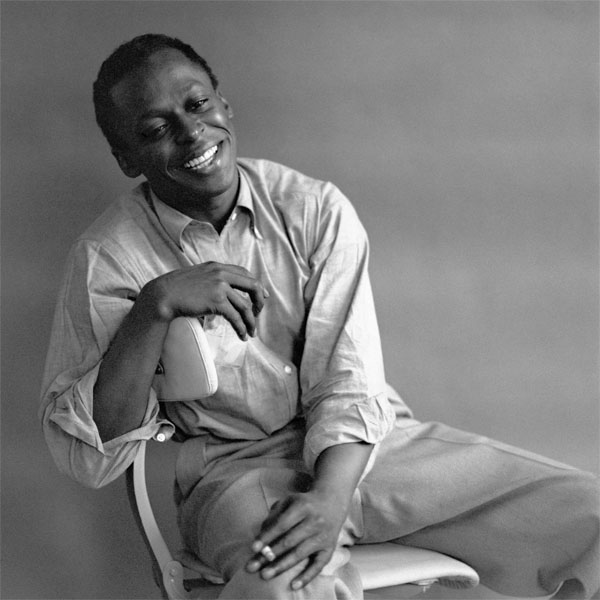
Miles Davis

- Bob Dahl, NFL lineman 1991–97
- Bill Daily, actor, I Dream of Jeannie, The Bob Newhart Show (born in Iowa)
- John Francis Daley, actor, Bones, Freaks and Geeks
- John P. Daley, Cook County commissioner
- Richard J. Daley, politician (Democrat), member of Illinois State Assembly, mayor of Chicago 1955–1976
- Richard M. Daley, politician (Democrat), attorney, Illinois state senator, mayor of Chicago 1989–2011, son of Richard J. Daley
- William M. Daley, 1997–2000 U.S. Secretary of Commerce and 2011–12 White House chief of staff
- Rick Dalpos, pro golfer
- Dorothy Dalton, silent-film actress
- Joel Daly, television journalist (born in Montana)
- Lar Daly, perennial politician
- Bill Damaschke, president of Warner Bros. animation
- Mark Damon, producer and actor
- Anthony D'Andrea, organized crime figure (born in Sicily)
- Ben Daniels, lawman, one of Teddy Roosevelt's Rough Riders
- Bert Daniels, MLB outfielder 1910–14
- Owen Daniels, NFL tight end, played for Super Bowl 50 champion Denver Broncos
- Randy Daniels, politician (Republican), secretary of state of New York, deputy mayor of New York City
- Shirley Danz, pro baseball player
- Eleanor Dapkus, pro baseball player
- Severn Darden, actor, charter member of Second City (born in Louisiana)
- Scott Darling, NHL goaltender, played for 2015 Stanley Cup champion Chicago Blackhawks
- Erik Darnell, NASCAR driver for Roush Fenway Racing
- Lisa Darr, actress, Popular, Life As We Know It, Flesh 'n' Blood
- Frankie Darro, actor
- Clarence Darrow, renowned Chicago-based attorney, Leopold and Loeb case, Scopes Trial (born in Ohio)
- Justin Whitlock Dart Sr., executive of Walgreens, Rexall
- Tom Dart, sheriff of Cook County
- Kristin Dattilo, actress, The Chris Isaak Show, Hitz
- Brian Daubach, MLB outfielder, minor-league manager
- Doris Davenport, actress, The Westerner
- George Davenport, frontiersman, Rock Island settler, Davenport, Iowa named for him (born in England)
- Bob Davidson, baseball umpire
- Andrew Davis, conductor, Lyric Opera of Chicago 2000–21 (born in England)
- Andrew Davis, film director, The Fugitive, Under Siege, A Perfect Murder, The Guardian
- Anthony Davis, 2012 NCAA basketball champion with Kentucky, first pick of 2012 NBA draft, 2020 NBA champion with Los Angeles Lakers
- Carl Davis, boxing cruiserweight champion, 2010
- Carl Davis, music producer
- Clifton Davis, actor and songwriter, "Never Can Say Goodbye"
- Corey Davis, NFL wide receiver
- Danny K. Davis, politician (Democrat), U.S. representative
- David Davis, campaign manager of Abe Lincoln, U.S. senator, Supreme Court justice (born in Maryland)
- Dorothy Salisbury Davis, crime novelist
- Edith Luckett Davis, mother of Nancy Reagan (born in Virginia)
- Floyd Davis, co-winner of 1941 Indianapolis 500
- George Davis, magazine editor
- George R. Davis, Civil War captain, U.S. representative (born in Massachusetts)
- Jessie Bartlett Davis, opera contralto
- Miles Davis, jazz musician, bandleader and composer, Grammy Lifetime Achievement Award
- Orbert Davis, trumpeter
- Rece Davis, television sportscaster
- Richard Davis, jazz musician
- Scott Davis, defensive end for Los Angeles Raiders 1988–94
- Shani Davis, two-time Olympic and world champion speed skater
- Zachary Taylor Davis, architect, Comiskey Park, archbishop Quigley Preparatory Seminary
- Clinton Davisson, Nobel Prize-winning physicist who discovered electron diffraction
- Charles G. Dawes, ambassador, vice president of United States 1925–29, winner of Nobel Peace Prize (born in Ohio)
- Henry M. Dawes, oil executive, Illinois banker, U.S. comptroller (born in Ohio)
- Rufus C. Dawes, president of Commercial Club of Chicago, Museum of Science and Industry (born in Ohio)
- Jimmy Dawkins, blues musician (born in Mississippi)
- Johnny Dawson, golfer, course designer
- William L. Dawson, politician (Democrat), U.S. representative 1943–70 (born in Georgia)
- J. Edward Day, lawyer and United States postmaster general 1961–63
- Todd Day, basketball player, all-time scoring leader for Arkansas

De–Dh

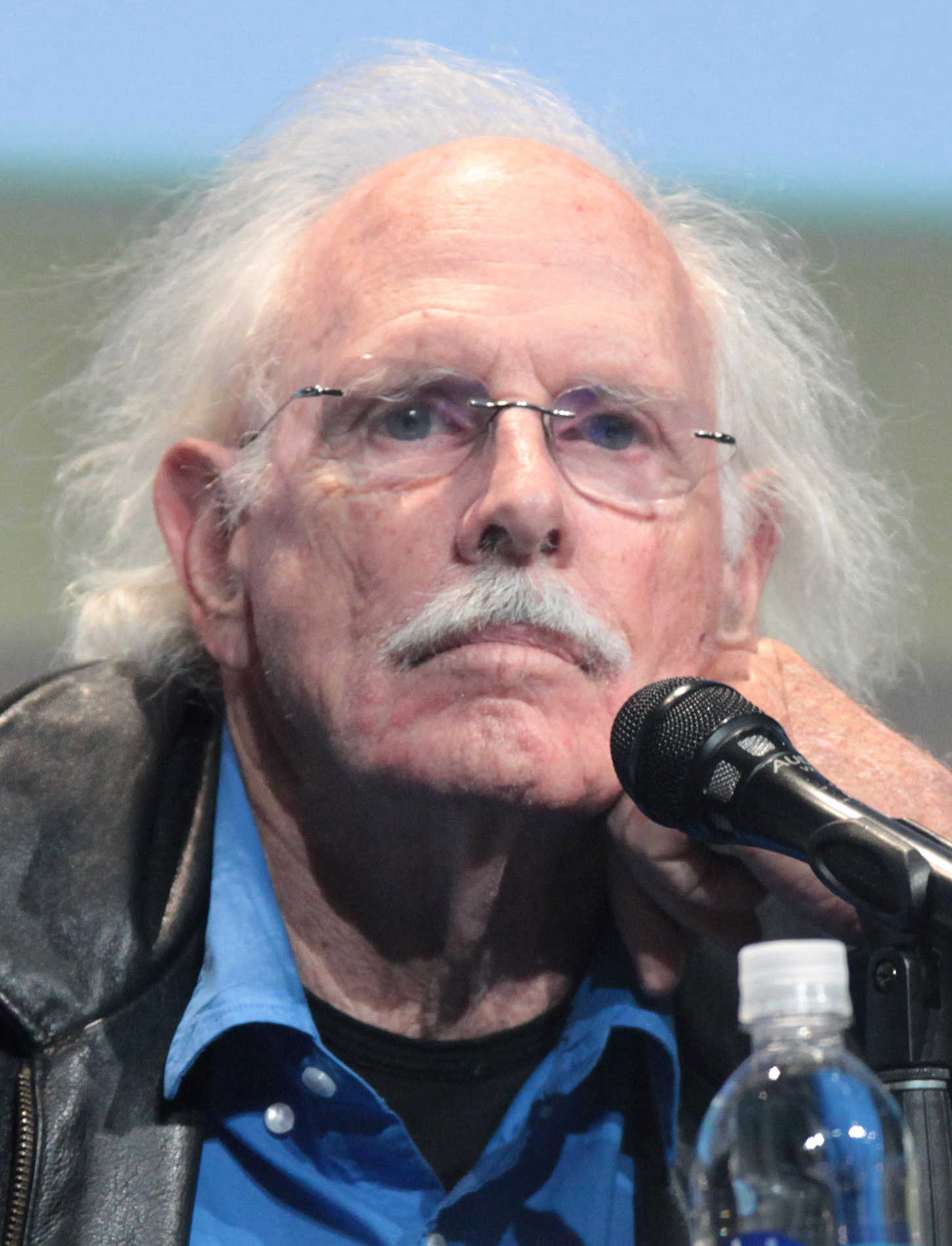
Bruce Dern

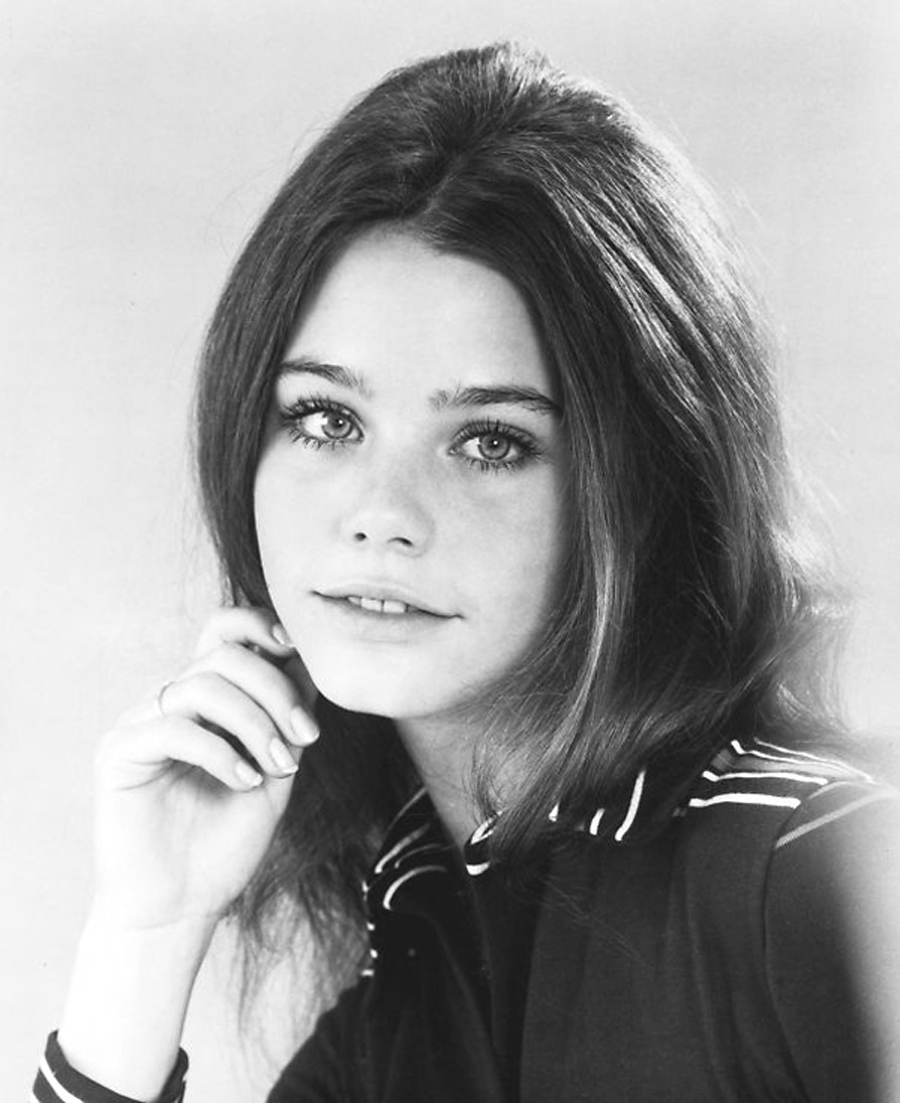
Susan Dey

- Margia Dean, actress and Miss America 1939 runner-up
- William F. Dean, World War II and Korean War general
- Jeffery Deaver, mystery novelist
- Billy DeBeck, cartoonist, creator of Barney Google
- Eugene V. Debs, socialist, IWW union leader, presidential candidate (born in Indiana)
- H. Joel Deckard, U.S. representative for Indiana 1979–83
- Steve Decker, MLB catcher 1990–99
- Bill DeCorrevont, Northwestern and pro football player
- Karen DeCrow, president of National Organization for Women
- Frances Dee, actress, Wells Fargo, Four Faces West (born in California)
- Lola Dee, singer
- Merri Dee, television personality
- John Deere, founder of Deere & Company (born in Vermont)
- Archie Dees, two-time Big Ten basketball MVP (born in Mississippi)
- Dudley DeGroot, coach of Washington Redskins and college teams
- Jack DeJohnette, jazz drummer
- Paul DeJong, MLB player (born in Florida)
- Lois Delander, first Miss America from Illinois (1927)
- Frederic Delano, railroad president, uncle of FDR (born in New York)
- Lea DeLaria, actress, Orange Is the New Black
- Vaughn De Leath, singer
- Floyd Dell, novelist and playwright
- The Dells, singing group, Rock and Roll Hall of Fame
- Al Demaree, MLB pitcher 1912–19
- AnnMaria De Mars, technology executive, author, world champion judoka; mother of Ronda Rousey
- Bruce DeMars, four-star U.S. Navy admiral
- William Dembski, mathematician, philosopher and theologian
- Ray Demmitt, MLB outfielder 1909–19
- Charles S. Deneen, two-term governor of Illinois
- Christopher Denham, actor, Argo, Sound of My Voice
- Edward E. Denison, politician, U.S. representative 1915–31
- Elias Smith Dennis, politician, Civil War general (born in New York)
- Richard Dent, Hall of Fame defensive lineman for Chicago Bears, MVP of Super Bowl XX (born in Georgia)
- Thomas Dent, 19th-sentury attorney
- Justin Dentmon, pro basketball player, 2010 top scorer in Israel Premier League
- Grant DePorter, restaurateur
- Oscar Stanton De Priest, U.S. representative, civil rights advocate, first African American elected to Congress in 20th century (born in Alabama)
- Bruce Dern, Oscar-nominated actor, Black Sunday, The Great Gatsby, Silent Running, Family Plot, Coming Home, Nebraska
- Ed Derwinski, politician, U.S. representative 1959–83 and U.S. secretary of Veterans Affairs 1989–92
- Tony DeSantis, theater owner, Drury Lane
- Jackie DeShannon, singer, "What the World Needs Now Is Love"
- Paul Des Jardien, University of Chicago center, College Football Hall of Fame, MLB pitcher (born in Kansas)
- Sam DeStefano, mobster
- Reid Detmers, MLB pitcher, 2022 no-hitter for Los Angeles Angels
- Armand Deutsch, film producer
- William Emmett Dever, mayor of Chicago 1923–27 (born in Massachusetts)
- Richard A. Devine, lawyer, Cook County state's attorney 1996–2008
- Karla DeVito, singer and actress
- Laura Devon, actress, Red Line 7000, Goodbye Charlie
- Peter De Vries, author, Pete 'n' Tillie, Reuben, Reuben
- James Dewar, baker, creator of Hostess Twinkie
- John Dewey, philosopher (born in Vermont)
- Lee DeWyze, singer, American Idol Season 9 winner
- Susan Dey, Golden Globe-winning actress, The Partridge Family, L.A. Law
- Dennis DeYoung, musician for rock band Styx

Di–Dn

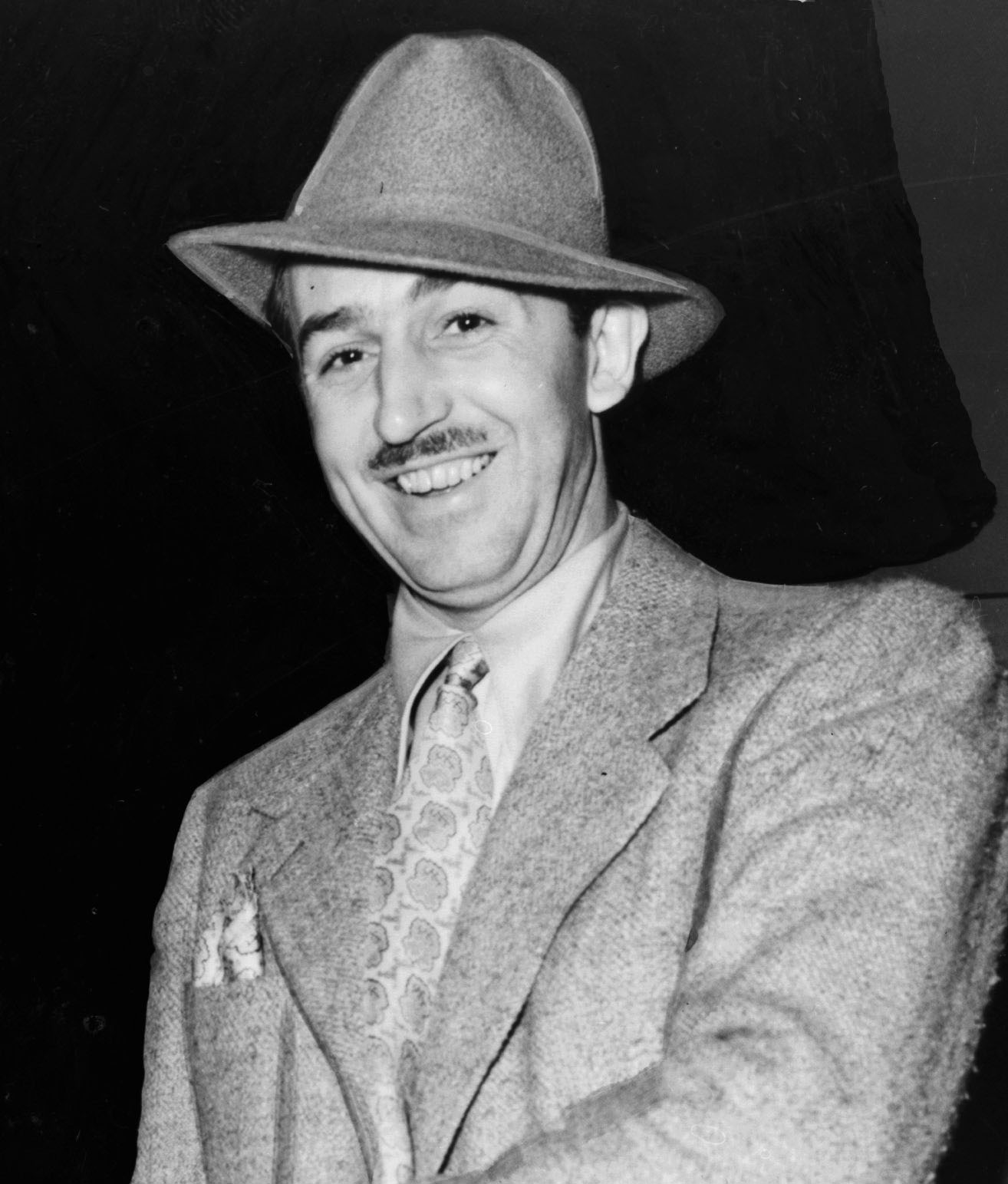
Walt Disney

- Douglas Diamond, economist, 2022 Nobel Prize winner
- David Díaz, lightweight boxing champion 2007–08
- Victor Diaz, baseball player (born in Dominican Republic)
- Andy Dick, comedian, NewsRadio (born in South Carolina)
- Philip K. Dick, science-fiction author, stories became films Blade Runner, Minority Report, Total Recall
- Augustus Dickens, brother of Charles Dickens (born in England)
- Annamary Dickey, opera singer
- Basil Dickey, screenwriter
- Frances Dickinson, physician, clubwoman, writer
- Johnny Dickshot, MLB outfielder 1936–45
- Bo Diddley, rock and blues musician, composer, Rock and Roll Hall of Fame (born in Mississippi)
- Nelson Diebel, swimmer, 1992 Olympic gold medalist
- David Diehl, offensive tackle, two-time Super Bowl champion with New York Giants 2003–13
- Pony Diehl, Wild West outlaw
- Doug Dieken, offensive lineman for Cleveland Browns 1971–84
- Ryan Diem, offensive tackle for Super Bowl XLI champion Indianapolis Colts 2001–11
- Scott Dierking, running back for New York Jets 1977–83
- William H. Dieterich, U.S. senator of Illinois 1933–39
- Charles Henry Dietrich, U.S. senator and governor of Nebraska
- Vince DiFrancesca, football coach, Western Illinois, Iowa State
- Tracy Dildy, basketball coach for Chicago State 2010–18
- John Dillinger, notorious bank robber, lived and died in Chicago, subject of films Dillinger, Public Enemies (born in Indiana)
- Frank Dillon, baseball player, Pacific Coast League Hall of Fame
- Melinda Dillon, Oscar-nominated actress, A Christmas Story, Absence of Malice, Close Encounters of the Third Kind
- Paul Dinello, actor, comedian, The Colbert Report
- Gerald Di Pego, screenwriter, Sharky's Machine, Message in a Bottle
- Everett Dirksen, politician (Republican), United States senator 1951–69, Senate minority leader
- Louis Disbrow, auto racer, drove in first four Indianapolis 500s
- Roy O. Disney, co-founder of Walt Disney Productions
- Walt Disney, iconic film and TV director, producer and animator, Disney studio founder and creator of Disneyland
- Mike Ditka, Hall of Fame pro football player and coach, TV commentator (born in Pennsylvania)
- Michael Diversey, brewer, 19th-century alderman (born in Germany)
- Alan J. Dixon, politician (Democrat), state treasurer, U.S. senator 1981–93
- Jessy Dixon, gospel singer
- Leo Dixon, MLB catcher 1925–29
- Malik Dixon, basketball player, top scorer in 2005 Israel Premier League
- Sherwood Dixon, lieutenant governor under Adlai Stevenson II
- Willie Dixon, blues musician (born in Mississippi)

Do–Dt

- Conrad Dobler, NFL offensive lineman 1972–81
- Larry Doby, baseball pioneer, outfielder, manager for Chicago White Sox (born in South Carolina)
- Townsend F. Dodd, World War I pilot, Distinguished Service Medal
- Katherine Sturges Dodge, illustrator
- Dorothy L. Dodson, U.S. champion in javelin and shot put
- John Doe, actor and musician with band X
- Eddie Doherty, journalist, Oscar-nominated screenwriter
- Edward A. Doisy, biochemist, 1943 Nobel Prize
- Caroline Dolehide, Wimbledon and U.S. Open doubles semi-finalist
- Courtney Dolehide, captain of UCLA's 2014 NCAA tennis champions
- Dave Dombrowski, MLB executive
- Jim Donahue, 19th-century baseball player
- John Donahoe, CEO of Nike, chairman of PayPal
- Mark Donahue, lineman for Michigan and Cincinnati Bengals
- Luke Donald, professional golfer, 1999 NCAA champion for Northwestern (born in England)
- Dorothy Donegan, jazz pianist
- Mike Donlin, baseball player and actor
- George Donner, organizer of Donner Party (born in North Carolina)
- Ral Donner, singer
- Professor Mike Donovan, middleweight boxer of bare-knuckle era
- Jimmy Dore, comedian, political commentator
- Tom Dore, basketball player and broadcaster
- Dolores Dorn, actress, The Bounty Hunter, Underworld U.S.A.
- Thomas A. Dorsey, gospel musician
- John Dos Passos, novelist
- Ayo Dosunmu, basketball player for Illinois and Chicago Bulls
- Emily Taft Douglas, politician, U.S. representative, first female Democrat from state elected to Congress
- Mike Douglas, singer and television talk-show host
- Paul Douglas, professor, politician (Democrat), 18-year U.S. senator of Illinois (born in Massachusetts)
- Stephen A. Douglas, politician (Democrat), U.S. senator 1847–61, presidential candidate vs. Abe Lincoln (born in Vermont)
- John A. Dowie, faith healer, Zion, Illinois founder (born in Scotland)
- Dave Downey, basketball player, holder of University of Illinois single-game scoring record
- Jim Downey, writer, Saturday Night Live
- Mike Downey, Los Angeles and Chicago newspaper columnist
- Susan Downey, film producer, Sherlock Holmes, Iron Man 2, The Judge, wife of Robert Downey Jr.
- Wayne A. Downing, four-star U.S. Army general
- Kathleen Doyle, pro basketball player, 2020 Big Ten Player of the Year
- Patti Solis Doyle, political consultant
- Larry Doyle, infielder, New York Giants, 1912 National League MVP
- Larry Doyle, writer, I Love You, Beth Cooper, The Simpsons
- Betsy Drake, actress, wife of Cary Grant (born in France)
- Francis M. Drake, Civil War general, governor of Iowa
- Frank Drake, astronomer, astrophysicist
- John Drake, co-founder of Drake Hotel
- Johnny Drake, NFL running back 1937–41
- Tracy Drake, co-founder of Drake Hotel
- Yochi Dreazen, journalist
- Jack Drees, television sportscaster
- Tom Dreesen, comedian
- Lance Dreher, 1986 Mr. Universe
- Theodore Dreiser, author, social activist (born in Indiana)
- Chuck Dressen, football quarterback, baseball manager for Brooklyn Dodgers and four more MLB teams
- Paddy Driscoll, Hall of Fame quarterback and head coach for Chicago Cardinals and Chicago Bears
- Robert Drivas, actor, The Illustrated Man, Cool Hand Luke
- Vincent Drucci, mobster
- John Drury, television journalist
- Charles Dryden, early 20th-century sportswriter

Du–Dz

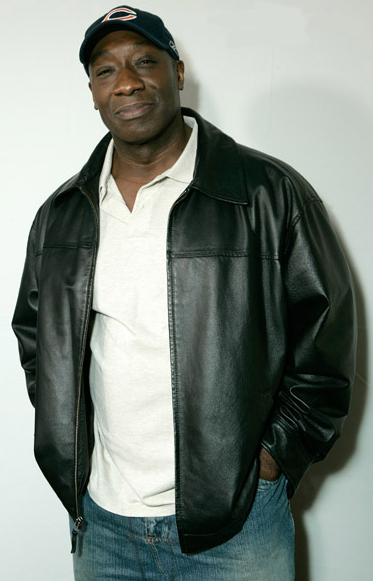
Michael Clarke Duncan

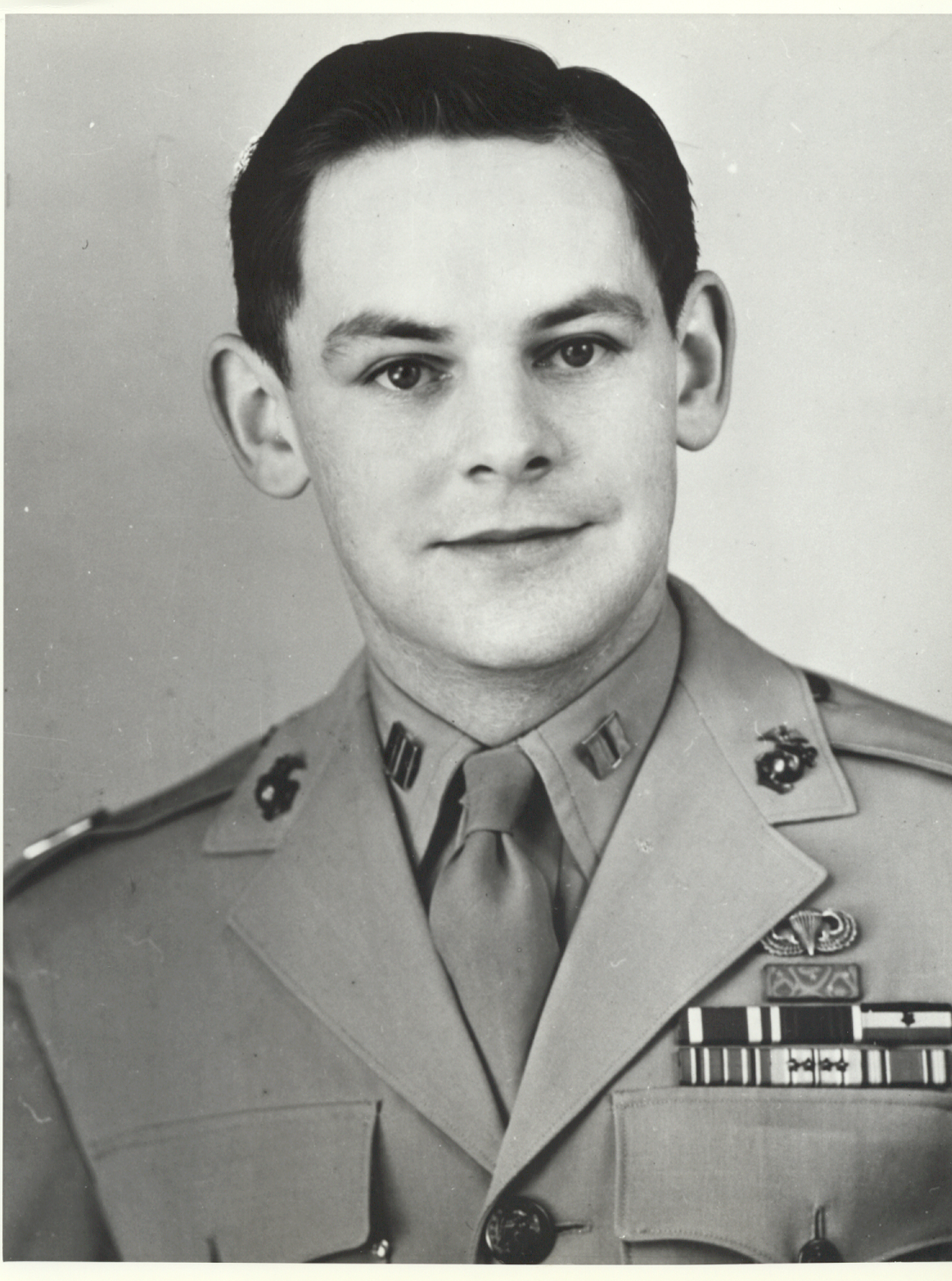
Robert Hugo Dunlap

- Fred Dubois, two-term U.S. senator from Idaho
- Richard L. Duchossois, horse racing executive
- Kevin Duckworth, center for five NBA teams
- Tammy Duckworth, veteran of Iraq War, U.S. representative and U.S. senator (born in Thailand)
- Art Dufelmeier, played for 1947 Rose Bowl champion Illinois, coached Western Illinois 1960–68
- John Duff, counterfeiter, Revolutionary War scout
- Terrence A. Duffy, CEO of Chicago Mercantile Exchange
- Dennis Dugan, director, actor, Big Daddy, Beverly Hills Ninja, Happy Gilmore, Jack and Jill, Grown Ups
- Tom Duggan, television commentator
- Tony Dumas, NBA player 1994–98
- Sharon K.G. Dunbar, U.S. Air Force general
- Arne Duncan, U.S. secretary of education 2009–15
- Joseph Duncan, governor of Illinois 1834–38, four-term U.S. representative (born in Kentucky)
- Michael Clarke Duncan, actor, The Green Mile, Kung Fu Panda, Armageddon, Planet of the Apes
- Thomas Duncan, Civil War general
- Katherine Dunham, dancer and choreographer
- Russell E. Dunham, decorated World War II soldier
- Robert Hugo Dunlap, officer at Iwo Jima, winner of Medal of Honor
- Kevin Dunn, actor, Transformers, Nixon, Unstoppable, Veep
- Nora Dunn, actress, comedian, Saturday Night Live, Sisters, Bruce Almighty, Three Kings
- Edward Joseph Dunne, bishop of Dallas 1894–1910 (born in Ireland)
- Finley Peter Dunne, author and journalist
- Edward Fitzsimmons Dunne, mayor of Chicago 1905–07 and governor of Illinois 1913–17 (born in Connecticut)
- George Dunne, president of Cook County Commissioners 1969–91
- Murphy Dunne, actor, keyboard player for Blues Brothers
- Santiago Durango, musician, attorney (born in Colombia)
- Chad Durbin, pitcher for eight MLB teams
- Dick Durbin, politician (Democrat), senior U.S. senator of Illinois, majority whip, U.S. representative
- Jim Durkin, politician (Republican), state representative
- Lindsey Durlacher, Greco-Roman wrestler, bronze medalist at World Championships
- Charles Duryea, automotive pioneer
- Jean Baptiste Point du Sable, settler, founder of Chicago
- Erv Dusak, player for 1946 World Series champion St. Louis Cardinals
- Charles Dvorak, pole vaulter, 1904 Olympic gold medalist
- Christian Dvorak, NHL forward
- Jim Dwyer, MLB outfielder, played for 1983 World Series champion Baltimore Orioles
- Conor Dwyer, swimmer, gold medalist at 2012 London Olympics
- Thomas Dyer, president of Chicago Board of Trade, mayor of Chicago 1856–57 (born in Connecticut)
- Walter Dyett, musician and educator
- Jimmy Dykes, player and manager for White Sox (born in Pennsylvania)
- Ryan Dzingel, pro hockey player

== E ==
Ea–Em

- Amelia Earhart, pioneer aviator, Chicago Hyde Park High graduate (born in Kansas)
- Glenn Earl, NFL safety 2004–09 (born in Michigan)
- Mary Tracy Earle, writer
- Jug Earp, pro football player
- Wyatt Earp, iconic American West lawman, subject of Tombstone, My Darling Clementine, Gunfight at the O.K. Corral
- Earth, Wind & Fire, band in Rock and Roll Hall of Fame
- John Porter East, U.S. senator for North Carolina 1981–86
- Martin Eberhard, co-founder of Tesla Motors
- Christine Ebersole, two-time Tony Award-winning actress and singer, Saturday Night Live, Ryan's Hope, 42nd Street
- Roger Ebert, film critic, Pulitzer Prize-winning journalist, author, television personality, co-host of Siskel & Ebert
- Buddy Ebsen, actor, The Beverly Hillbillies, Barnaby Jones, Captain January, Davy Crockett, Breakfast at Tiffany's
- Vilma Ebsen, dancer and actress, Broadway Melody of 1936
- Earl Eby, athlete, silver medalist in 1920 Summer Olympics
- Garrett Eckbo, landscape architect
- Walter Eckersall, fullback for Chicago 1905 national champions, Hall of Fame, sportswriter, referee
- William Eckert, Major League Baseball commissioner 1965–68
- James Eckhouse, actor, Beverly Hills, 90210
- Nora Eddington, actress, wife of Errol Flynn
- Dwight Eddleman, three-sport Illinois athlete, NBA All-Star
- J. W. Eddy, politician, lawyer, Angels Flight designer (born in New York)
- John R. Eden, 19th-century U.S. representative (born in Kentucky)
- Jim Edgar, secretary of state and 1991–99 governor of Illinois
- John Edgar, naval commander, land baron, politician (born in Ireland)
- Booker Edgerson, football cornerback (born in Arkansas)
- Robert W. Edgren, cartoonist, 1904 Olympic athlete
- Benjamin S. Edwards, 19th-century lawyer and politician
- Bruce Edwards, MLB catcher 1946–56
- India Edwards, vice-chair of Democratic National Committee 1950–56
- Jon Edwards, MLB pitcher 2014–19
- Ninian Edwards, politician (Democratic-Republican), U.S. senator 1818–26 and governor of Illinois 1826–30 (born in Maryland)
- Ninian Wirt Edwards, educator, married to sister of Mary Todd Lincoln
- Steve Edwards, pro football lineman
- Chandler Egan, NCAA, U.S. Amateur golf champion, course designer
- Edward Egan, cardinal, archbishop of New York 2000–2009
- Jennifer Egan, 2011 Pulitzer Prize-winning novelist
- John Egan, guard for Loyola basketball 1963 national champions
- John Joseph Egan, monsignor, civil rights activist
- Walter Egan, golfer, 1904 Olympic gold medalist
- Dave Eggers, writer, editor, and publisher, author of A Heartbreaking Work of Staggering Genius
- Rube Ehrhardt, MLB pitcher 1924–29
- Tim Ehrhardt, pole vaulter
- David Eigenberg, actor, Steve Brady on Sex and the City
- Deborah Eisenberg, short story writer, actress
- Brett Eldredge, country singer
- Charlie Elgar, bandleader (born in Louisiana)
- Karl Eller, original owner of Phoenix Suns, CEO of Circle K
- Kurt Elling, jazz singer
- Bump Elliott, halfback for Michigan and Purdue, coach at Michigan, athletic director at Iowa, College Football Hall of Fame
- Ezekiel Elliott, running back for Dallas Cowboys, 2015 Big Ten MVP, fourth pick of 2016 NFL draft
- Jake Elliott, kicker for Super Bowl LII champion Philadelphia Eagles
- Pete Elliott, football head coach for Nebraska, Illinois, Cal and Miami, College Football Hall of Fame
- Bo Ellis, basketball player for 1977 NCAA champion Marquette and Denver Nuggets
- Fred Ellis, cartoonist
- LaPhonso Ellis, center for four NBA teams
- Nelsan Ellis, actor, True Blood, Get On Up
- Larry Ellison, CEO of Oracle Corporation, philanthropist, owner of Indian Wells Tennis Garden (born in New York)
- Daniel Ellsberg, activist who released Pentagon Papers
- Elmer E. Ellsworth, first Civil War casualty (born in New York)
- Bob Elson, Hall of Fame baseball broadcaster
- John Ely, pitcher for Los Angeles Dodgers 2010–12
- Melvin Ely, center-forward for five NBA teams
- Ari Emanuel, Hollywood superagent, co-CEO of William Morris Endeavor
- Rahm Emanuel, mayor of Chicago 2011–19, U.S. representative 2003–09, senior advisor to Bill Clinton 1993–98, chief of staff to Barack Obama 2009–10, U.S. ambassador to Japan
- Louis Lincoln Emmerson, merchant, secretary of state and governor of Illinois 1929–33
- The Emotions, singing group, Best of My Love

En–Ez

- Eric Engberg, television journalist
- Larry English, NFL linebacker 2009–15, two-time MAC MVP for Northern Illinois
- Jason Enloe, pro golfer
- Rex Enright, football coach, South Carolina 1938–56
- William Enyart, politician (Democrat), U.S. representative 2013–15
- A. J. Epenesa, defensive lineman for Iowa and Buffalo Bills
- Philip "Phil" Erenberg, gymnast, Olympic silver medalist
- Paul Erickson, pitcher for Cubs 1941–48
- Roger Erickson, MLB pitcher 1978–83
- John Erlenborn, politician (Republican), U.S. representative 1965–85
- Kallen Esperian, opera singer
- Cameron Esposito, comedian
- Joe Esposito, road manager of Elvis Presley, Michael Jackson
- Joe Esposito, organized crime figure (born in Italy)
- Sammy Esposito, infielder for White Sox 1952–63
- Tony Esposito, 15-year goaltender for Chicago Blackhawks, member of Hockey Hall of Fame (born in Canada)
- Bill Essick, MLB pitcher and scout
- Richard Estes, photorealistic painter
- Nick Etten, MLB first baseman 1938–47
- Ruth Etting, singer, subject of Love Me or Leave Me (born in Nebraska)
- Aja Evans, bobsledder, bronze medalist at 2014 Winter Olympics
- Andrea Evans, actress, One Life to Live
- Bergen Evans, television personality, professor (born in Ohio)
- Bill Evans, jazz musician
- Billy Evans, MLB umpire
- Chick Evans, golfer, won U.S. Open as amateur, member of World Golf Hall of Fame
- Dan Evans, baseball executive
- Fred Evans, NFL defensive tackle 2006–13
- John Evans, physician, governor of Colorado territory, co-founder of Northwestern University (born in Ohio)
- Lane Evans, politician (Democrat), U.S. representative 1983–2007
- Marsha J. Evans, admiral, CEO of American Red Cross
- Betty Everett, singer (born in Mississippi)
- Elizabeth Hawley Everett, educator, writer
- Phil Everly, singer with Everly Brothers, Rock and Roll Hall of Fame
- Hoot Evers, MLB outfielder 1941–56 (born in Missouri)
- Johnny Evers, Hall of Fame second baseman, managed Cubs and White Sox (born in New York)
- Lisa Evers, radio-TV personality, former VP of Guardian Angels
- Bryan Eversgerd, MLB pitcher and coach
- Cory Everson, six-time Ms. Olympia (born in Wisconsin)
- Jimmy Evert, tennis player and coach, father of Chris Evert
- Eve Ewing, sociologist and writer, professor at University of Chicago
- Fred Ewing, surgeon, Oklahoma football coach
- Thomas W. Ewing, politician (Republican), U.S. representative 1991–2001
- William Lee D. Ewing, governor (14 days) and U.S. senator 1835–37 (born in Kentucky)

== F ==
Fa–Fh

- Red Faber, Hall of Fame pitcher for White Sox; three wins in 1917 World Series (born in Iowa)
- Janet Fairbank, opera singer
- N.K. Fairbank, soap manufacturer, philanthropist
- Don Fairfield, pro golfer (born in Kansas)
- Ben Falcone, actor, director, Tammy, The Boss
- Rich Falk, basketball player and coach, Northwestern
- Cy Falkenberg, MLB pitcher 1903–17
- Richard Fancy, actor, General Hospital, The District, Seinfeld
- Jim Fanning, MLB player, manager and general manager
- Kay Fanning, newspaper editor and publisher
- Dennis Farina, actor, Chicago police officer, Law & Order, Crime Story, Get Shorty, Manhunter, Saving Private Ryan
- Chris Farley, comedian and actor, Second City and Saturday Night Live (born in Wisconsin)
- Dot Farley, silent-film actress
- Ed Farmer, pitcher for eight MLB teams, sportscaster
- Mimsy Farmer, actress, Spencer's Mountain, Hot Rods to Hell
- Henry Farnam, surveyor, builder and president of Chicago, Rock Island and Pacific Railroad (born in New York)
- Elon J. Farnsworth, Union general in Civil War, killed at Gettysburg
- John F. Farnsworth, Union general in Civil War, seven-term U.S. representative (born in Canada)
- Louis Farrakhan, Nation of Islam leader (born in New York)
- James T. Farrell, author, Studs Lonigan
- Charles B. Farwell, philanthropist, U.S. senator (born in New York)
- John V. Farwell, department store founder (born in New York)
- Sal Fasano, MLB catcher 1996–2008
- Jeff Fassero, pitcher for nine MLB teams
- Nancy Faust, musician, stadium organist
- Harris W. Fawell, politician (Republican), U.S. representative 1985–99
- Meagen Fay, actress, Second City, Dirty Rotten Scoundrels, Malcolm in the Middle
- Kenneth Fearing, poet and novelist
- Carol Feeney, rower, Olympic silver medalist
- Jesse W. Fell, land baron, helped establish Illinois State University (born in Pennsylvania)
- Alfred T. Fellheimer, architect
- John Felske, MLB player and manager
- Gary Fencik, defensive back for Super Bowl XX champion Chicago Bears
- Jean Fenn, opera singer
- Randy Fenoli, fashion designer, Say Yes to the Dress
- Irene Fenwick, silent-film actress, wife of Lionel Barrymore
- Tom Fergus, NHL center 1981–93
- Helen Ferguson, film publicist and actress
- Enrico Fermi, nuclear physicist, University of Chicago professor, 1936 Nobel Prize in Physics winner (born in Italy)
- Joseph Ferriola, mobster
- George Washington Gale Ferris Jr., inventor of Ferris wheel
- Elisha P. Ferry, first governor of Washington (born in Michigan)
- Edwin Feulner, president of The Heritage Foundation 1977–2013
- Tina Fey, actress and comedian, writer-performer for Second City (born in Pennsylvania)

Fi–Fn

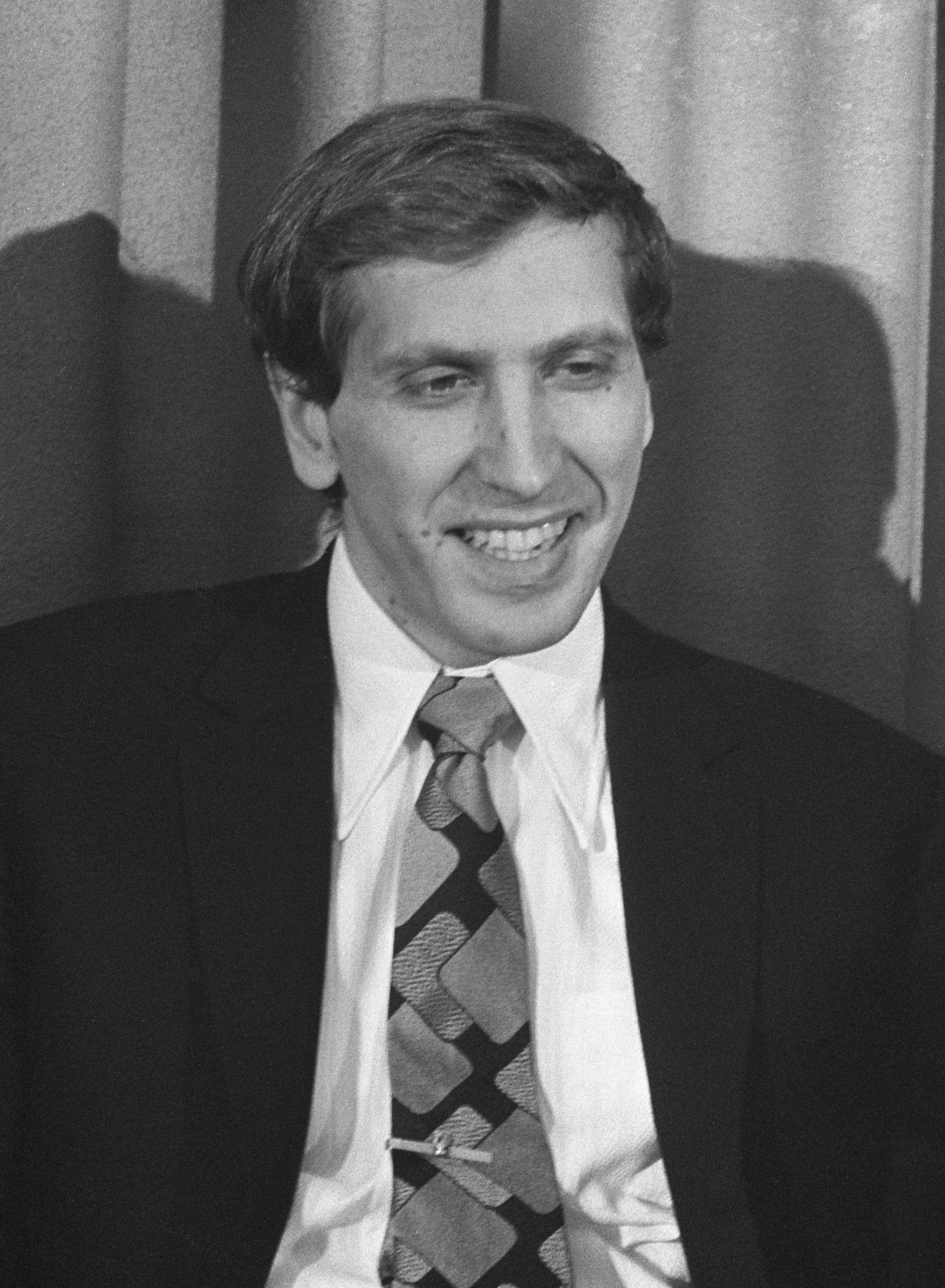
Bobby Fischer

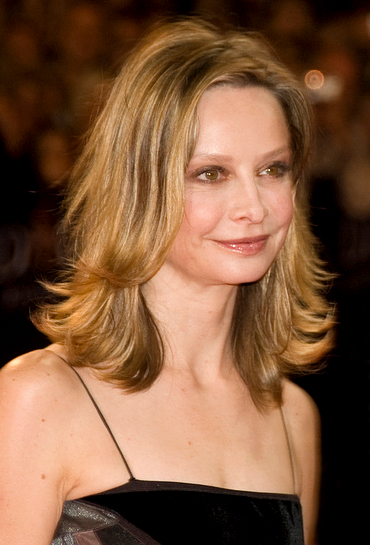
Calista Flockhart

- Lupe Fiasco, rapper, musician
- Carl Fick, filmmaker, novelist
- Orlando B. Ficklin, U.S. representative 1843–49 (born in Kentucky)
- Eugene Field, journalist and author
- Marshall Field, businessman, department store founder and philanthropist (born in Massachusetts)
- Marshall Field III, banker, publisher and philanthropist
- Marshall Field IV, owner of Chicago Sun-Times 1956–65
- Ted Field, entrepreneur, auto racing, film producer, Cocktail, Runaway Bride, Mr. Holland's Opus, Riddick
- Jackie Fields, boxer, Olympic and pro welterweight champ
- Joseph W. Fifer, Civil War officer, city attorney of Bloomington, governor of Illinois (born in Virginia)
- Tim Finchem, commissioner of golf's PGA Tour 1994–2016
- Paul Findley, politician (Republican), U.S. representative 1961–83
- Vivian Fine, composer
- Jim Finigan, MLB infielder 1954–59
- Tom Fink, mayor of Anchorage, Alaska 1987–94
- Jim Finks, pro football player and executive, Hall of Fame (born in Missouri)
- Charles O. Finley, owner of Oakland A's 1960–81 (born in Alabama)
- John Huston Finley, educator, New York Times editor
- Michael Finley, pro basketball player 1995–2010, Dallas Mavericks executive, film producer
- Katie Finneran, actress, two-time Tony Award winner
- Allison Finney, golfer
- Mauro Fiore, Oscar-winning cinematographer (born in Italy)
- Harvey S. Firestone Jr., chairman of Firestone Tire and Rubber Company
- Bill Fischer, lineman for NFL's Chicago Cardinals, member of College Football Hall of Fame
- Bobby Fischer, world chess champion
- Leo Fischer, sports journalist, basketball executive
- John Fischetti, 1969 Pulitzer Prize-winning cartoonist (born in New York)
- Bud Fisher, cartoonist, Mutt and Jeff
- Eileen Fisher, fashion designer (born in New York)
- George M.C. Fisher, CEO of Eastman Kodak and Motorola
- Lester E. Fisher, director of Lincoln Park Zoo 1962–92
- Steve Fisher, basketball coach, San Diego State and 1989 NCAA champion Michigan
- Carlton Fisk, Hall of Fame catcher for Red Sox and White Sox (born in Vermont)
- Jack Fisk, film director, Oscar-nominated art and production designer, husband of Sissy Spacek
- Horatio Fitch, silver medalist in 400 meters at 1924 Summer Olympics
- John Fitzgerald, two-time Olympian in pentathlon
- Pat Fitzgerald, football coach for Northwestern 2006–23
- Patrick Fitzgerald, U.S. Attorney, 2001–12 (born in New York)
- Peter Fitzgerald, politician (Republican), U.S. senator 1999–2005
- Thomas R. Fitzgerald, judge, Supreme Court of Illinois 2000–10
- John Fitzpatrick, catcher, 1,787 hits in minor leagues
- Bob Fitzsimmons, boxing heavyweight champion (born in England)
- Five Stairsteps, singing group, "O-o-h Child"
- Max Flack, outfielder, played in 1918 World Series
- The Flamingos, singing group, "I Only Have Eyes for You"
- Crista Flanagan, comedic actress, MADtv
- Walter Flanigan, co-founder of National Football League
- Michael Flatley, dancer and choreographer, Lord of the Dance
- P. J. Fleck, football head coach, Minnesota
- Coby Fleener, NFL tight end 2012–17
- Darius Fleming, linebacker for Notre Dame and New England Patriots
- Bill Flemming, sportscaster
- Art Fletcher, MLB player, coach and manager
- Darrin Fletcher, MLB catcher 1989–2002
- Calista Flockhart, actress, Ally McBeal, Supergirl, Feud: Capote vs. The Swans, wife of Harrison Ford
- Milton S. Florsheim, founder of Florsheim shoe company
- Paul Flory, Nobel Prize-winning chemist
- Cliff Floyd, MLB outfielder for seven teams, 1997 World Series champion
- Fahey Flynn, Chicago radio-TV journalist (born in Michigan)
- John Flynn, director, screenwriter, Rolling Thunder, The Outfit, Out for Justice, Lock Up
- Neil Flynn, actor, Scrubs, The Middle

Fo–Fp

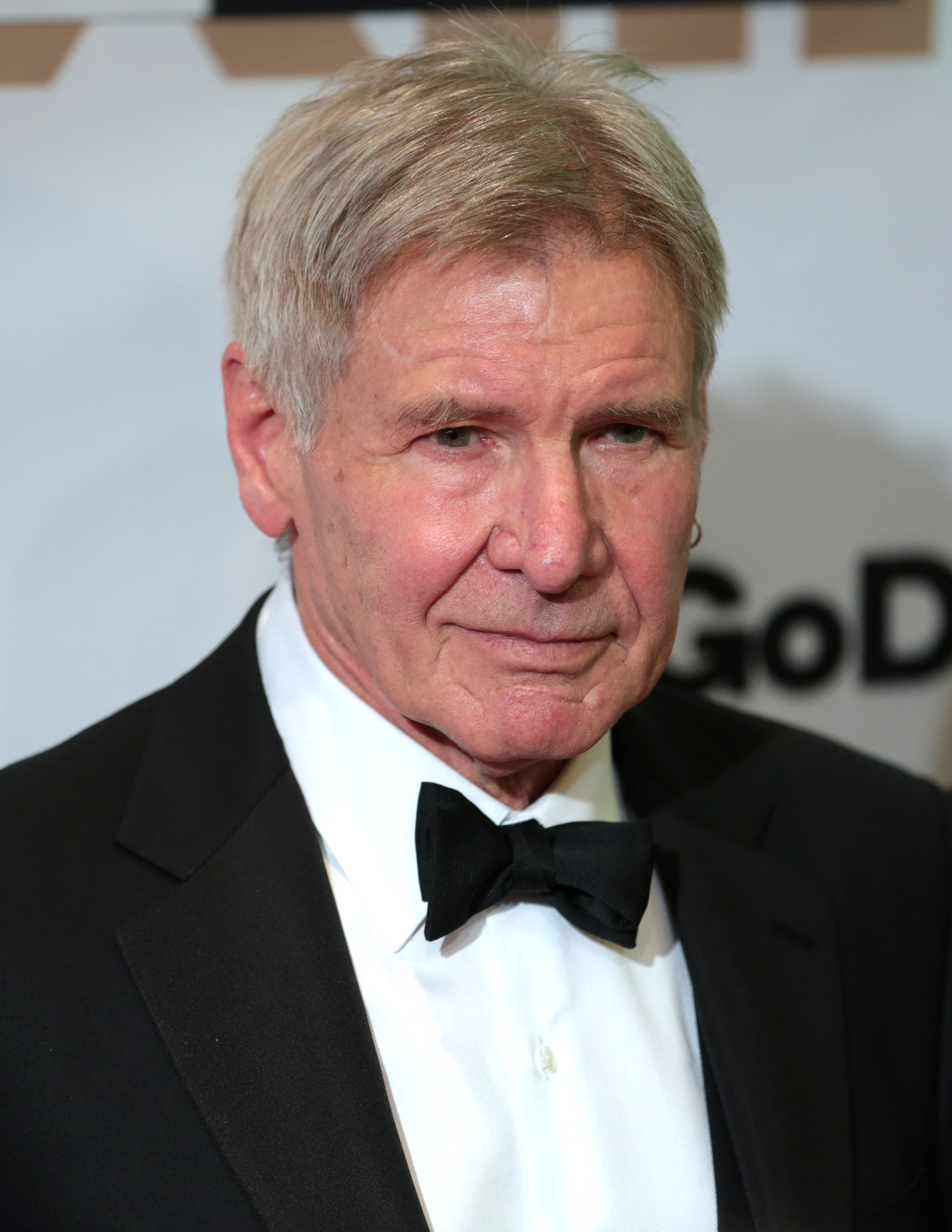
Harrison Ford

- Dan Fogelberg, folk/rock musician and composer
- Lee Fogolin, NHL player 1974–87
- Pat Foley, hockey broadcaster
- Thomas C. Foley, U.S. ambassador to Ireland 2006–09
- Tim Foley, 10-year defensive back for Miami Dolphins
- Mike Foltynewicz, MLB pitcher 2014–21
- Art Folz, banned NFL player
- Ralph Foody, actor, Home Alone, Code of Silence
- Tom Foran, U.S. Attorney, chief prosecutor of Chicago Seven trial
- Betty Ford, 1974–1977 First Lady of the United States, founder of Betty Ford Center
- Dorothy Ayer Gardner Ford, mother of President Gerald Ford
- Harrison Ford, Oscar-nominated actor, Indiana Jones films, original Star Wars trilogy, Blade Runner, Patriot Games, Air Force One, The Fugitive, 42
- Judith Ford, 1969 Miss America
- Percy Ford, auto racer, third in 1921 Indy 500
- Ruth VanSickle Ford, painter, director of Chicago Academy of Fine Arts
- Thomas Ford, eighth governor of Illinois (born in Pennsylvania)
- Carl Foreman, Oscar-winning screenwriter, High Noon, The Bridge on the River Kwai, The Guns of Navarone
- James Forman, civil rights leader
- Harry Forrester, basketball coach
- Josephine Forsberg, improv coach, Second City, Players Workshop
- Aldo Forte, NFL player and coach
- Frank Foss, pole vaulter, 1920 Summer Olympics gold medalist
- George Edmund Foss, U.S. representative 1895–1913
- Bob Fosse, Oscar and Tony-winning choreographer, director, Cabaret, Sweet Charity, Lenny, Chicago, All That Jazz
- Ray Fosse, catcher for five Major League teams
- Steve Fossett, commodities trader, aviator, adventurer (born in Tennessee)
- Bill Foster, politician (Democrat), U.S. representative
- Gloria Foster, actress, The Matrix
- Greg Foster, hurdler, 10-time national champion, three-time world champion, 1984 Olympic silver medalist
- Kevin Foster, MLB pitcher 1993–2001
- Martin D. Foster, surgeon, mayor of Olney, U.S. representative
- Rube Foster, manager of Chicago American Giants, member of Baseball Hall of Fame (born in Texas)
- Scott Michael Foster, actor, Greek, Chasing Life, Crazy Ex-Girlfriend
- Susanna Foster, actress, Phantom of the Opera
- David Foulis, Chicago golf pro and innovator (born in Scotland)
- James Foulis, 1896 U.S. Open golf champion (born in Scotland)
- Albert Fowler, mayor of Rockford 1864–68 (born in Massachusetts)
- Bertha Fowler, educator, preacher, deaconess
- Richard Fowler, radio host, media personality, activist, Fox News contributor
- Carol Fox, opera impresario
- Nellie Fox, Hall of Fame infielder for White Sox (born in Pennsylvania)
- Terry Fox, MLB pitcher 1960–66
- Virgil Fox, organist
- Kim Foxx, politician, Cook County state's attorney
- Redd Foxx, comedian and actor, Sanford and Son, Cotton Comes to Harlem, Harlem Nights (born in Missouri)
- Bryan Foy, film producer

Fr–Fz

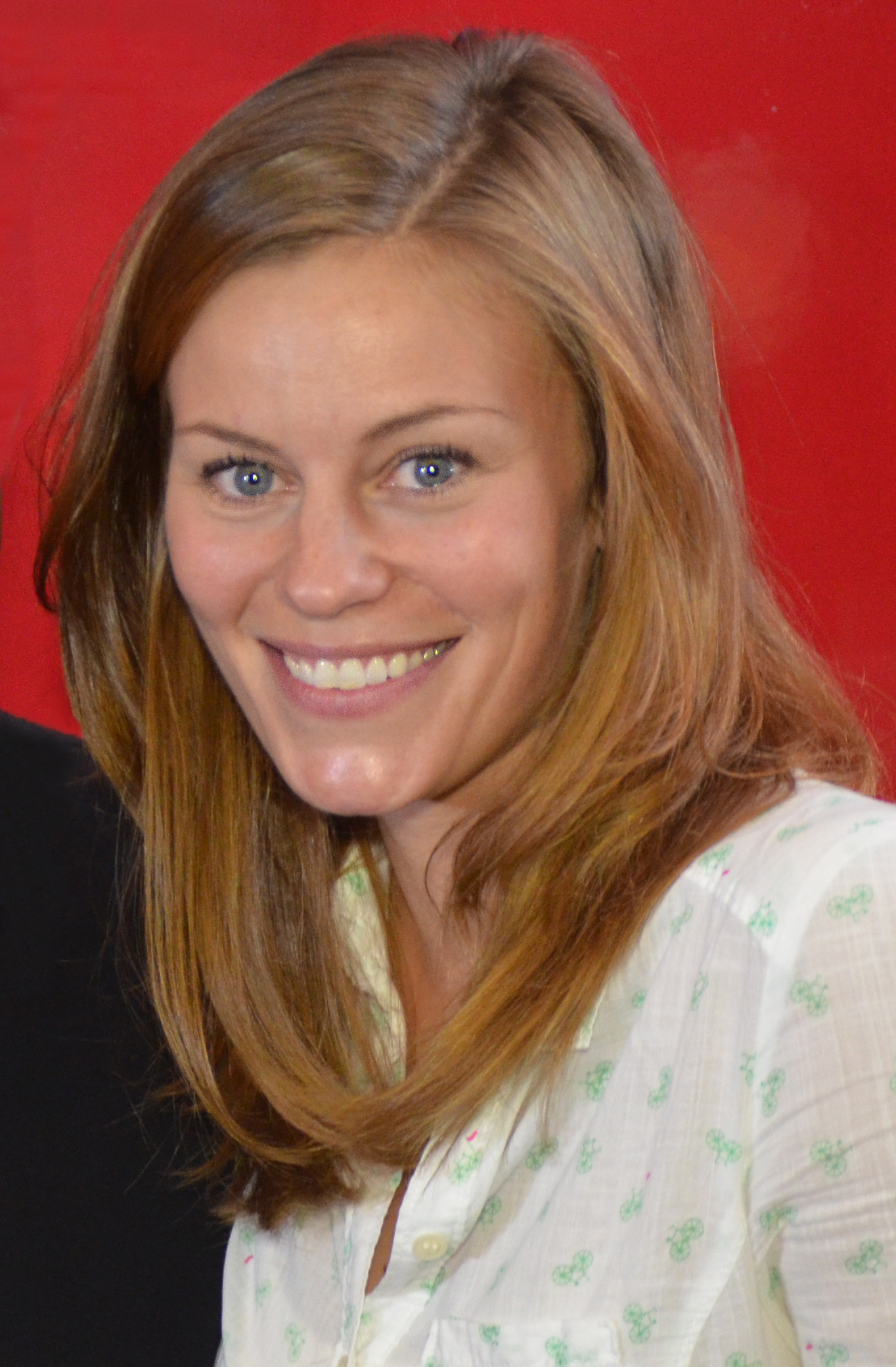
Cassidy Freeman

- Clint Frank, football player for Yale, winner of 1937 Heisman Trophy
- Melvin Frank, director and screenwriter, White Christmas, A Funny Thing Happened on the Way to the Forum
- Pat Frank, journalist and author
- Art Frantz, umpire, crew chief of 1975 World Series
- Frank Frantz, final governor of Oklahoma Territory
- Dennis Franz, Emmy-winning actor, NYPD Blue, Hill Street Blues, Dressed to Kill, American Buffalo, Die Hard 2
- John E. Franz, organic chemist, discovered glyphosate
- Jonathan Franzen, author, 2001 National Book Award winner
- Chick Fraser, pitcher for 1907, 1908 champion Chicago Cubs
- Laura Gardin Fraser, sculptor, coin designer
- Bobby Frasor, basketball player, 2009 NCAA champion North Carolina
- Jason Frasor, MLB relief pitcher 2004–15
- Harry Frazee, owned Boston Red Sox, traded Babe Ruth
- Walt Frazier, Hall of Fame guard for Southern Illinois and New York Knicks (born in Georgia)
- Andy Frederick, offensive lineman for two Super Bowl champions
- John T. Frederick, literary scholar, professor (born in Iowa)
- Bud Freeman, big-band saxophonist
- Cassidy Freeman, actress, musician, Smallville, Longmire
- Charles E. Freeman, judge, Supreme Court of Illinois 1990–2018 (born in Virginia)
- Donnie Freeman, pro basketball player 1967–76
- Kathleen Freeman, actress, The Blues Brothers, The Nutty Professor, North to Alaska, Blues Brothers 2000
- Marvin Freeman, MLB pitcher 1986–96
- Russ Freeman, jazz pianist
- Von Freeman, saxophonist
- Paul Frees, voice actor
- Ashley Freiberg, auto racer
- Augustus C. French, lawyer, governor of Illinois 1846–53 (born in New Hampshire)
- William M. R. French, first director of Art Institute of Chicago (born in New Hampshire)
- Arny Freytag, photographer
- Betty Friedan, writer, activist, feminist, author of The Feminine Mystique
- William Friedkin, Oscar-winning director, The Exorcist, The French Connection, Sorcerer, To Live and Die in L.A.
- Kinky Friedman, musician, novelist, Texas politician
- Leo Friedman, songwriter, "Let Me Call You Sweetheart"
- Milton Friedman, Nobel Prize-winning economist
- Friend & Lover, singing duo, "Reach out of the Darkness"
- Owen Friend, MLB infielder 1949–56
- Johnny Frigo, violinist, bassist and songwriter
- Art Fromme, MLB pitcher 1906–15
- Charles Sumner Frost, architect of Navy Pier Auditorium, LaSalle Street Station (born in Maine)
- Jim Fuchs, two-time Olympic medalist, 1951 Pan Am Games shot put and discus champion
- Nicholas J. Fuentes, paleoconservative political commentator, podcaster, activist
- Francis Fukuyama, philosopher, political economist, author
- Charles Eugene Fuller, U.S. representative 1903–13, 1915–26
- Jack Fuller, editor and publisher of Chicago Tribune
- Loie Fuller, pioneer of modern dance
- Melville Fuller, lawyer, editor, politician, U.S. chief justice 1888–1910 (born in Maine)
- R. Buckminster Fuller, scientist, architect, inventor, author
- Hugh Fullerton, early 20th-century sportswriter, exposed Black Sox scandal
- Xavier Fulton, tackle in Canadian Football League
- Zach Fulton, NFL offensive lineman 2014–21 (born in Michigan)
- Ivan Fuqua, relay gold medalist, 1932 Summer Olympics
- George Furth, playwright, actor, Butch Cassidy and the Sundance Kid, Shampoo, Cannonball Run
- Jules Furthman, Oscar-nominated screenwriter, Mutiny on the Bounty, To Have and Have Not, Rio Bravo

== G ==
Ga–Gd

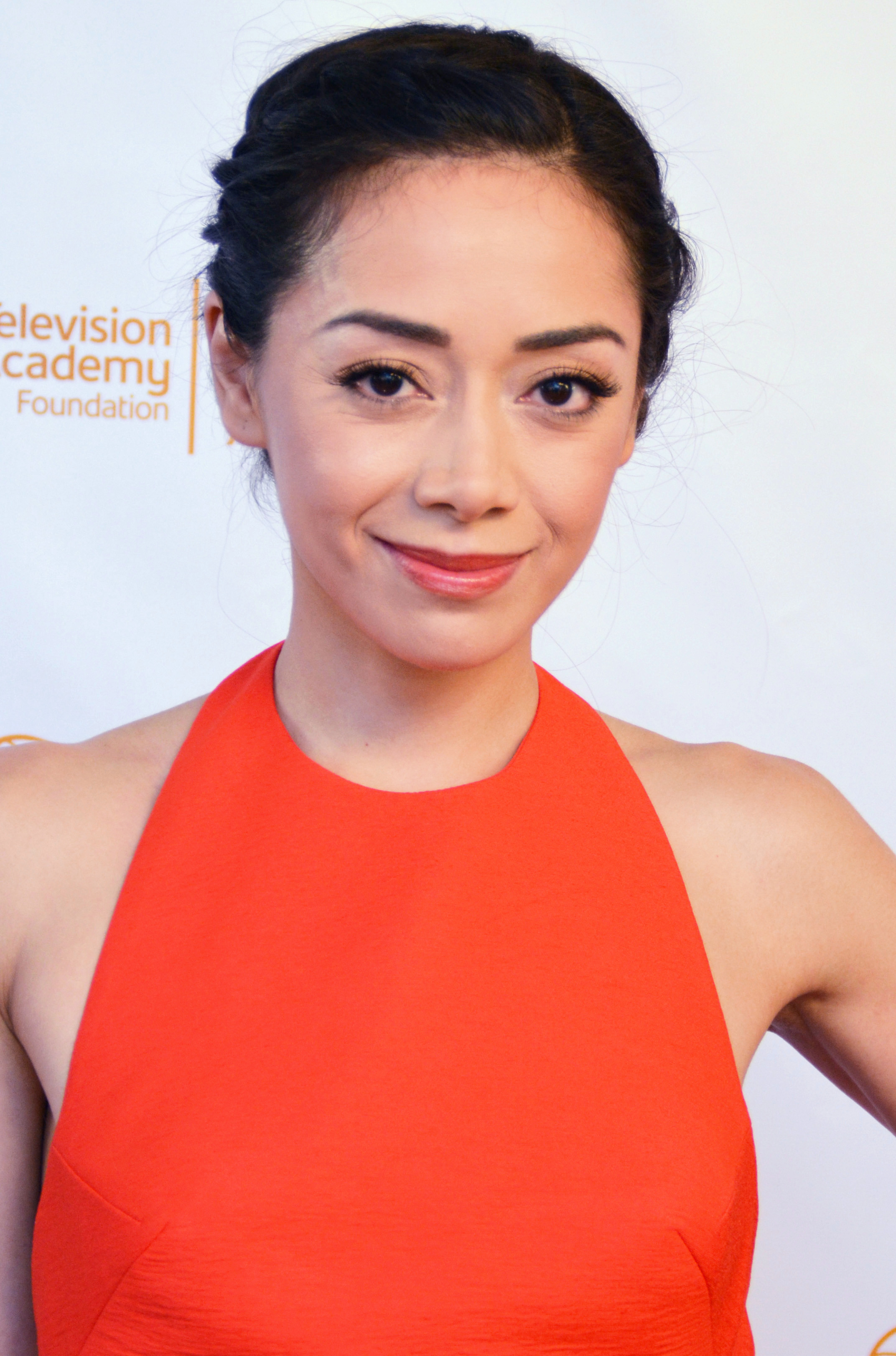
Aimee Garcia

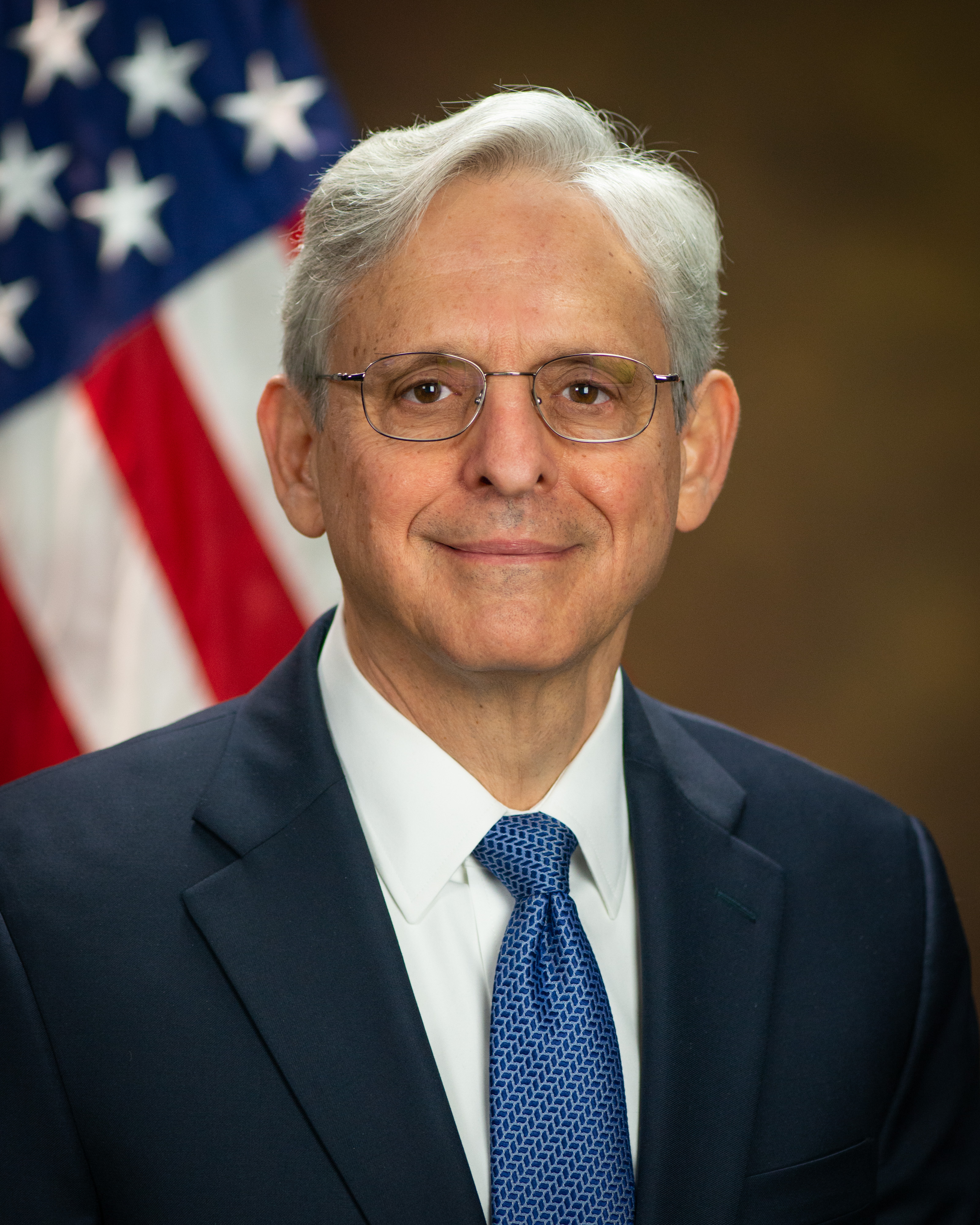
Merrick Garland

- Marianne Gaba, actress, Miss Illinois USA 1957, Playboy Playmate
- Andrew Gabel, speed skater, 1994 Olympic silver medalist
- John Wayne Gacy, serial killer
- Gadabout Gaddis, fly-fishing expert
- Eddie Gaedel, baseball pinch-hitter
- Belva Gaertner, inspiration for "Velma Kelly" in play and film Chicago
- Gary Gaetti, MLB third baseman 1981–2000, won 1987 World Series with Minnesota Twins
- Jim Gaffigan, comedian and actor
- Ben Gage, announcer, husband of Esther Williams
- Lyman J. Gage, politician (Republican), banker and US Secretary of The Treasury (born in New York)
- Frank Galati, screenwriter and playwright
- Milt Galatzer, MLB outfielder 1933–39
- George Washington Gale, namesake of Galesburg, founder of Knox College (born in New York)
- Gladys Gale, singer and actress
- Johnny Galecki, actor, Roseanne, The Big Bang Theory
- Harry Gallatin, forward for New York Knicks, player and coach for Southern Illinois, basketball Hall of Fame
- Mary Onahan Gallery, writer, editor
- Tom Gallery, actor, married to ZaSu Pitts
- Ralph Galloway, pro football player
- Paul Galvin, founder of Motorola
- Harry Gamage, football coach, South Dakota, Kentucky
- Lu Gambino, football player, MVP of 1948 Gator Bowl
- Kevin Gamble, player for four NBA teams
- Mason Gamble, actor, Dennis the Menace, Spy Hard, Rushmore
- James Gammon, actor, Nash Bridges, Revenge, Major League
- Gale Gand, chef, television personality
- Mike Gandy, NFL lineman 2001–09
- Jeanne Gang, architect
- Terry Gannon, sportscaster for NBC, Golf Channel, basketball player for 1983 NCAA champion NC State
- Rudolph Ganz, pianist, music educator (born in Switzerland)
- Alan Garber, provost and president, Harvard University
- Aimee Garcia, actress, Dexter, Greetings from Tucson, George Lopez
- Dave Garcia, MLB manager
- Barry Gardner, NFL player 1999–2006
- Earle Gardner, MLB player 1908–1912
- Robert Gardner, golfer, two-time U.S. Amateur champion
- Wix Garner, football coach, Western Illinois 1942–47
- Merrick Garland, attorney, judge, U.S. attorney general
- Jeff Garlin, actor, comedian, director, Curb Your Enthusiasm, Daddy Day Care, The Goldbergs
- Rita Garman, judge, Supreme Court of Illinois 2001–22
- Lee Garmes, Oscar-winning cinematographer
- Kevin Garnett, NBA center 1995–2016, 2000 Olympic gold medalist, 2004 MVP of NBA, Hall of Fame (born in South Carolina)
- Jimmy Garoppolo, quarterback for Eastern Illinois and four NFL teams
- Scott Garrelts, pitcher for San Francisco Giants 1982–91
- Darell Garretson, NBA referee in Hall of Fame
- Augustus Garrett, land speculator, mayor of Chicago 1843–46 (born in New York)
- Dick Garrett, guard for four NBA teams
- Harriet E. Garrison, physician; medical writer
- Dave Garroway, Chicago radio-TV personality, first host of NBC's Today show (born in New York)
- Jennie Garth, actress, Beverly Hills, 90210
- Elbert Henry Gary, lawyer, county judge, corporate officer, a U.S. Steel founder; Gary, Indiana named for him
- John Warne Gates, barbed wire mogul, founder of company that became Texaco
- William Gates, subject of documentary Hoop Dreams
- Bryan Gaul, pro soccer player
- Janina Gavankar, actress, True Blood, The Mysteries of Laura
- Hobart R. Gay, World War II general
- Mitzi Gaynor, entertainer and actress, South Pacific, There's No Business Like Show Business, The Joker Is Wild, Golden Girl, Les Girls

Ge–Gm

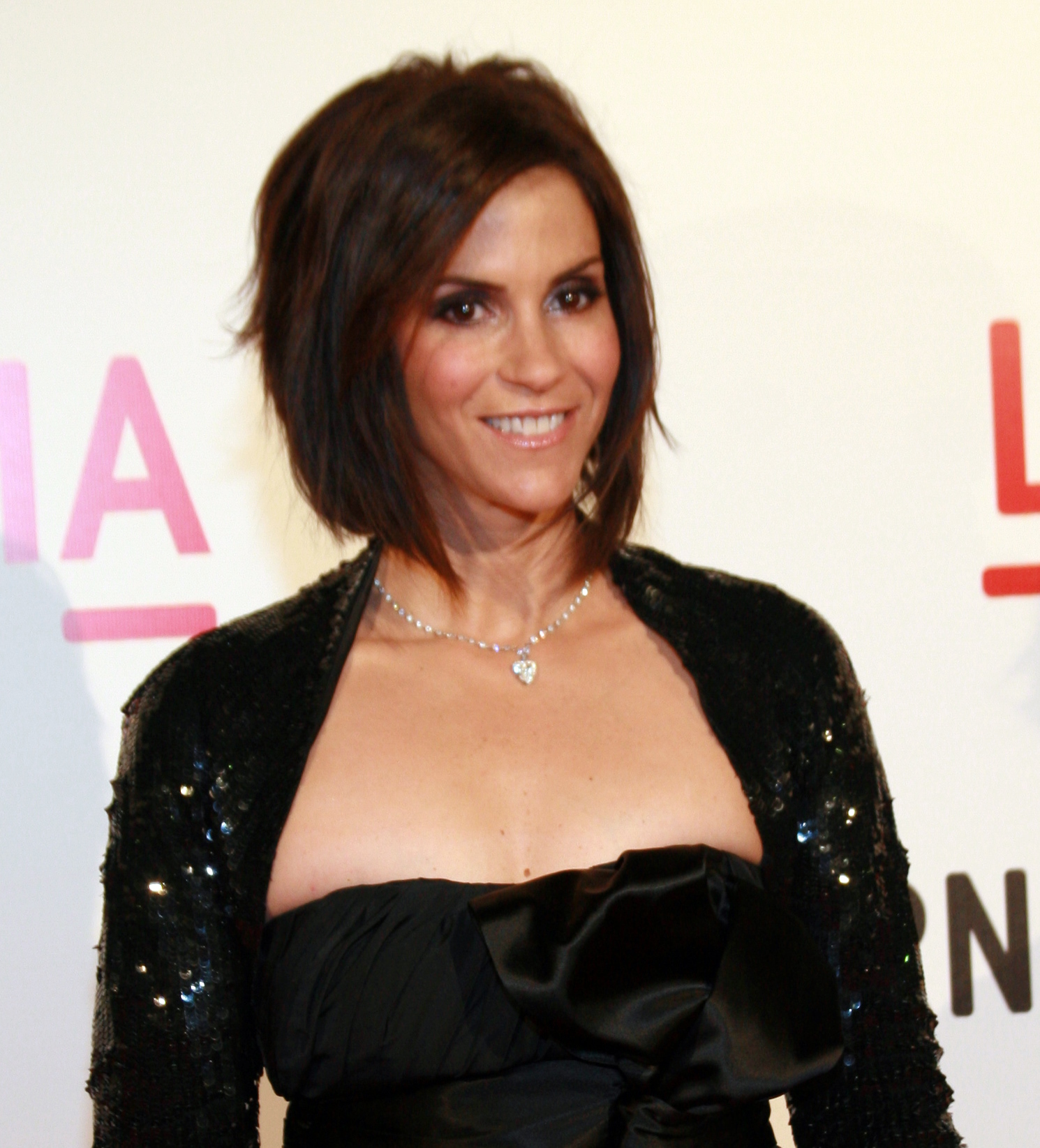
Jami Gertz

- Jason Gedrick, actor, Iron Eagle, Boomtown, Murder One, Luck
- Eric Gehrig, pro soccer player
- Gary Geiger, outfielder for four MLB teams
- Bill Geist, author, TV correspondent, CBS Sunday Morning
- Willie Geist, co-host of MSNBC's Morning Joe and NBC's Today
- Larry Gelbart, Emmy-winning television and Oscar-nominated film writer, Tony-winning playwright
- Michael Gelman, television producer
- Angelo Genna, organized crime figure (born in Sicily)
- Bill George, 13-year linebacker for Chicago Bears, member of Pro Football Hall of Fame (born in Pennsylvania)
- Francis George, Roman Catholic cardinal, archbishop of Chicago
- Kenny George, among tallest basketball players in history
- Phil Georgeff, horse-racing caller of more than 95,000 races
- Sid Gepford, NFL player
- Henry Gerber, gay rights activist (born in Germany)
- Neva Gerber, early 20th-century actress
- Jami Gertz, actress, Still Standing, Sibs, Twister, Less than Zero
- Jody Gerut, MLB outfielder 2003–10
- Charlie Getzien, 19th-century MLB pitcher
- Tavi Gevinson, blogger and feminist
- Georgie Anne Geyer, journalist and author
- Andrea M. Ghez, astrophysicist, 2020 Nobel Prize in Physics (born in New York)
- Ray Giacoletti, basketball coach for Utah, Eastern Washington, Drake
- Carl Giammarese, lead vocalist of The Buckinghams
- Sam Giancana, organized crime figure
- Mark Giangreco, Chicago sportscaster (born in New York)
- John Giannini, basketball coach for Maine, La Salle
- Alexi Giannoulias, state treasurer 2007–11, Illinois Secretary of State
- Jim Gibbons, tight end for Detroit Lions 1958–68
- Marla Gibbs, actress, The Jeffersons, 227, The Hughleys
- Charles Gibson, television journalist and personality, ABC News and Good Morning, America
- Diana Gibson, actress, Adventure's End, Behind the Headlines
- Norwood Gibson, MLB pitcher 1903–06
- Oliver Gibson, NFL defensive tackle 1995–2003
- Emily Giffin, novelist
- Barry Gifford, novelist, Wild at Heart
- Florence Gilbert, silent-film actress
- Warren Giles, National League president 1957–69, Hall of Fame
- Zach Gilford, actor, Friday Night Lights
- Kendall Gill, pro basketball player, commentator
- Edward B. Giller, Air Force major general
- Earl Gillespie, sportscaster
- King C. Gillette, inventor of safety razor (born in Wisconsin)
- Fred Gillies, tackle for Chicago Cardinals
- Paul Gilmartin, comedian, podcaster, TV personality, Dinner and a Movie
- Douglas H. Ginsburg, judge
- Joe Girardi, MLB catcher 1989–2003, manager, four World Series championships with New York Yankees
- Adele Givens, actress, The Hughleys, Queens of Comedy
- Graham Glasgow, NFL offensive lineman
- Ryan Glasgow, NFL defensive lineman 2017–20
- Henry P. Glass, architect, Art Institute professor
- Stephen Glass, journalist for The New Republic fired for fraud
- Kid Gleason, player, manager for Chicago White Sox 1912–23 (born in New Jersey)
- Roy Gleason, outfielder, 1-for-1 in only MLB at-bat
- Otis F. Glenn, lawyer, U.S. senator 1928–33
- Caroline Glick, journalist, deputy managing editor of Jerusalem Post
- Joseph Glidden, patented barbed wire (born in New York)
- Gina Glocksen, two-time American Idol contestant
- Al Glossop, MLB infielder 1939–46
- Bruce Glover, actor, Diamonds Are Forever, Chinatown

Go–Gq

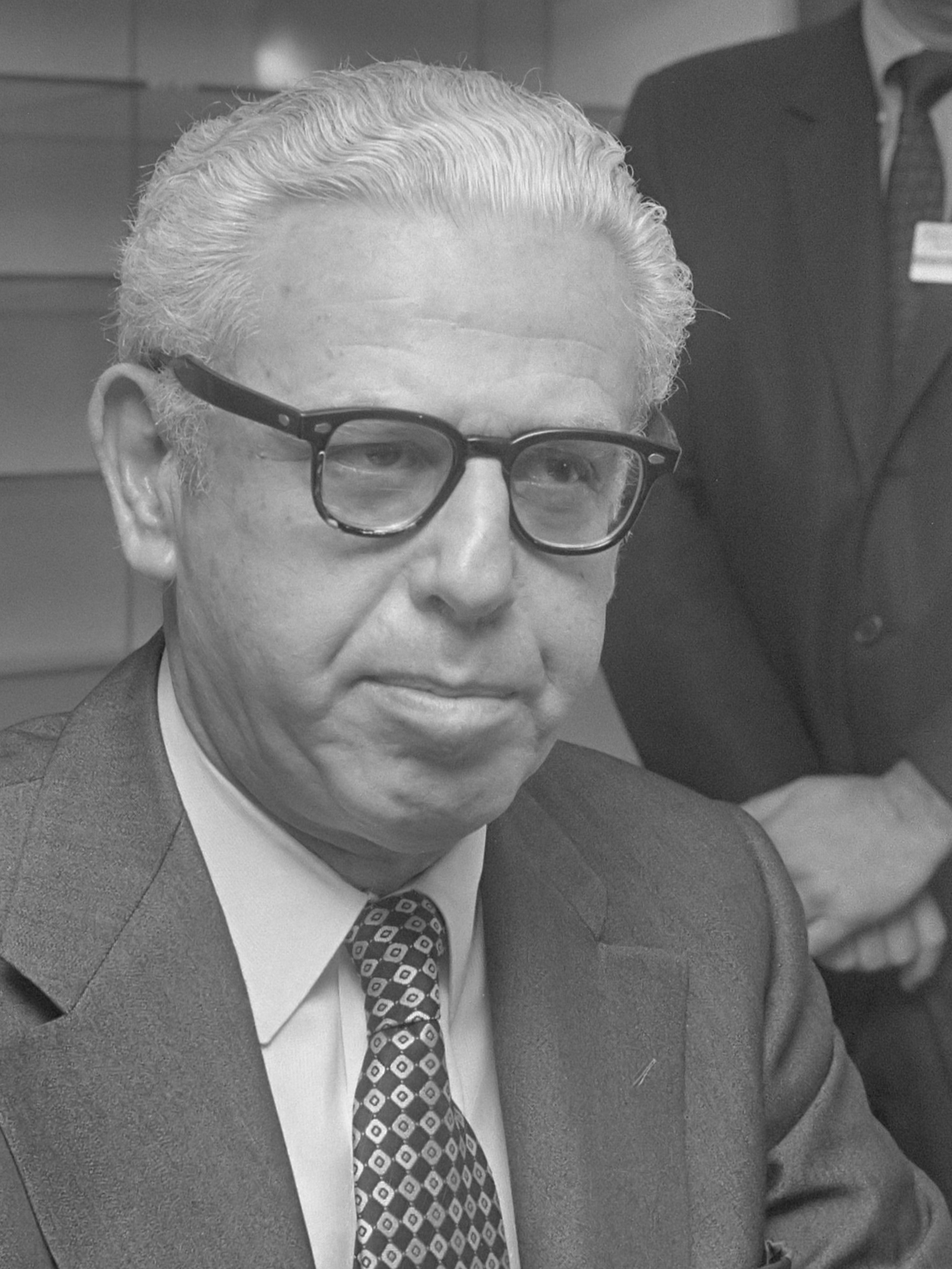
Arthur Goldberg

- Bob Goalby, professional golfer, winner of 1968 Masters Tournament
- George Gobel, comedian, musician and Emmy Award-winning actor
- Godfrey, comedian, actor
- Timothy Goebel, figure skater, 2002 Olympics bronze medalist
- John D. Goeken, founder of MCI Inc and Airfone
- Billy Goelz, pro wrestler
- Harold Goettler, World War I aviator
- Mike Goff, NFL guard 1998–2009
- Gracie Gold, U.S. champion figure skater (born in Massachusetts)
- Albert Goldbarth, poet
- Arthur Goldberg, U.S. secretary of labor 1961–62, ambassador to U.N. 1965–68
- Barry Goldberg, keyboardist, record producer
- Bertrand Goldberg, architect, designer of Marina City
- Sarah Goldberg, actress, 7th Heaven
- Grant Golden, tennis player
- Jack Golden, NFL linebacker 2000–03
- James Goldman, playwright, Oscar-winning screenwriter, The Lion in Winter, Nicholas and Alexandra, Robin and Marian
- Ronald Goldman, murder victim in O. J. Simpson trial
- William Goldman, author, Oscar-winning screenwriter, Butch Cassidy and the Sundance Kid, All the President's Men, The Princess Bride
- Arlene Golonka, actress, Mayberry R.F.D., Hang 'Em High, The Busy Body
- Andrew Golota, heavyweight boxer, 1988 Summer Olympics medalist (born in Poland)
- Jaslene Gonzalez, fashion model, winner of America's Next Top Model Cycle 8
- Benny Goodman, musician and bandleader, recipient of Grammy Lifetime Achievement Award
- Steve Goodman, singer-songwriter, "City of New Orleans"
- William O. Goodman, lumber tycoon, founder of Goodman Theater (born in Pennsylvania)
- Charles Goodnight, cattle baron and trailblazer
- Andrew Goodpaster, U.S. Army general, NATO Supreme Commander, superintendent of West Point
- Ron Gora, swimmer, NCAA and Pan-Am Games champion
- Alicia Goranson, actress, Roseanne, Boys Don't Cry, The Conners
- Sarah Gorden, pro soccer player
- Seth Gordon, director, Horrible Bosses, Identity Thief
- Stuart Gordon, director, writer, producer, Re-Animator
- Edward Gorey, artist and writer
- Ken Gorgal, defensive back, 1950, 1954 NFL champion
- Mark Gorski, cyclist, gold medalist in 1984 Summer Olympics
- Tom Gorzelanny, pitcher for five MLB teams
- Freeman Gosden, co-creator and star of Amos 'n' Andy
- Tuffy Gosewisch, catcher for Arizona Diamondbacks
- Jeff Gossett, NFL punter 1981–96
- Sue Gossick, diver, gold medalist in 1968 Summer Olympics
- Mark Gottfried, basketball coach, Alabama, NC State, Cal State Northridge (born in Ohio)
- Robert Gottschalk, cameraman, founder of Panavision
- Chester Gould, creator of Dick Tracy (born in Oklahoma)

Gra–Grd

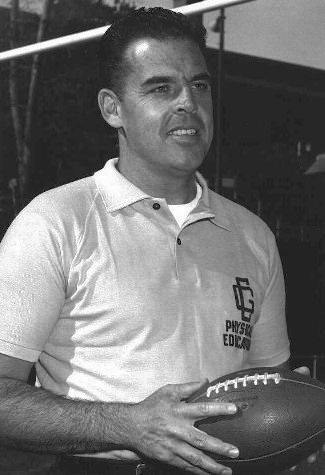
Otto Graham

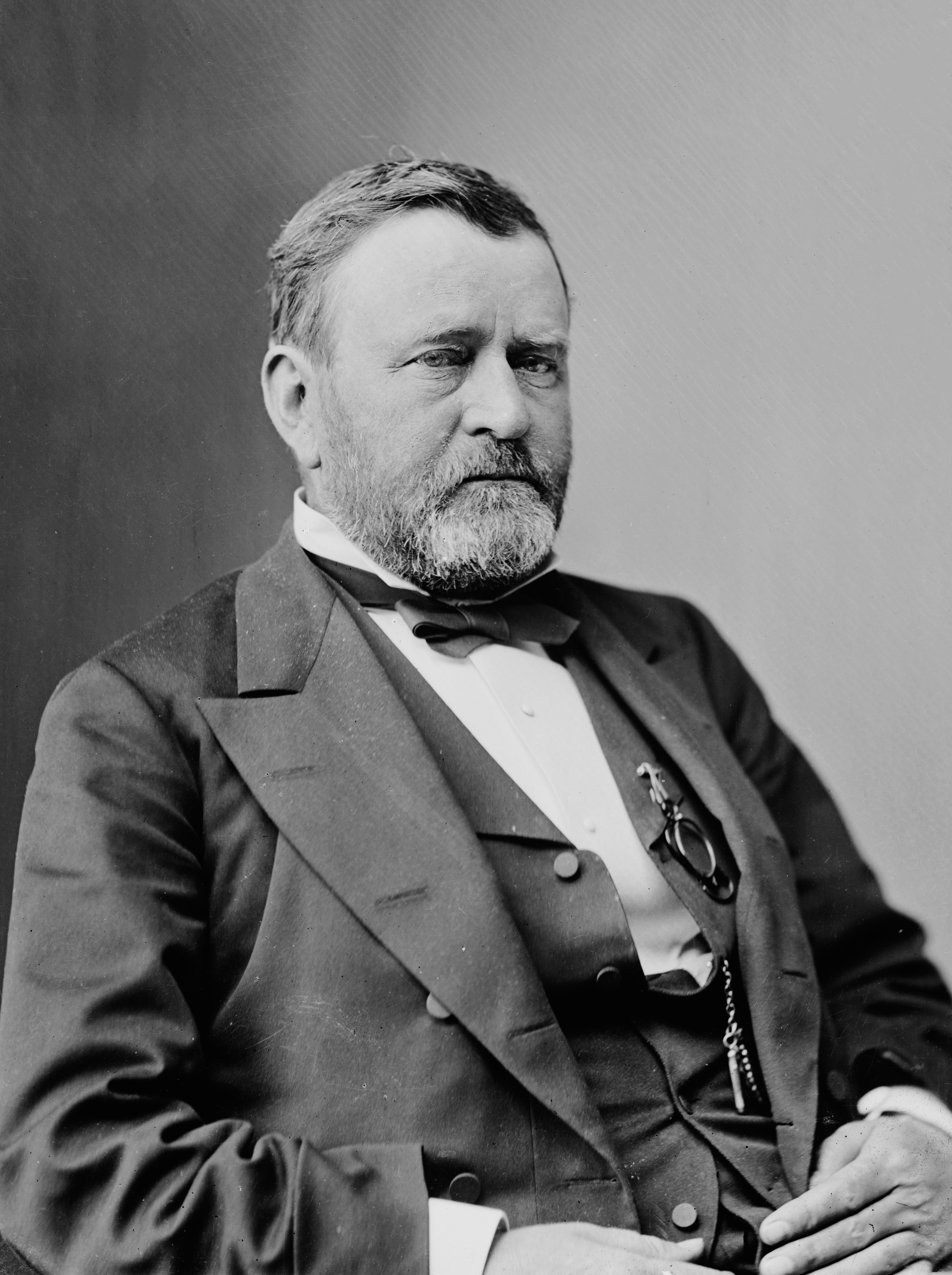
Ulysses S. Grant

- Harry Grabiner, longtime White Sox executive
- Jim Grabowski, MVP of 1964 Rose Bowl, running back for Chicago Bears and Green Bay Packers, broadcaster
- Joe Grace, MLB outfielder 1938–47
- Thomas Joseph Grady, archbishop of Orlando, Florida 1974–89
- Joseph V. Graff, lawyer, U.S. representative 1895–1911 (born in Indiana)
- Billy Graham, evangelist (born in North Carolina)
- Bruce Graham, architect of Sears Tower and John Hancock Center (born in Colombia)
- Kent Graham, NFL quarterback 1992–2002
- Otto Graham, Hall of Fame quarterback for Cleveland Browns, head coach for Washington Redskins
- Nancy Lee Grahn, actress, General Hospital, Santa Barbara
- Peaches Graham, early 20th-century ballplayer
- Stedman Graham, businessman, partner of Oprah Winfrey
- Judy Grahn, poet
- Billy Grammer, musician, "Detroit City"
- Curtis Granderson, MLB outfielder 2004–19, three-time All-Star
- Red Grange, college and pro Hall of Fame football player (born in Pennsylvania)
- Bill Granger, novelist and journalist (born in Wisconsin)
- Bob Grant, radio personality
- Frederick Dent Grant, soldier, diplomat, son of President Ulysses S. Grant
- James Grant, first president of Chicago and Rock Island Railroad
- James Edward Grant, screenwriter, The Alamo, Hondo, McLintock!
- Mark Grant, MLB pitcher 1984–93, broadcaster
- Michael Grant, boxer
- Ulysses S. Grant, commander of Illinois regiment, Civil War general and 18th President of the United States (1869–1877) (born in Ohio)
- Ulysses S. Grant III, soldier, city planner, grandson of U.S. Grant
- Cammi Granato, captain of 1998 Winter Olympics gold-medal U.S. women's hockey team, Hockey Hall of Fame
- Don Granato, head coach of Buffalo Sabres 2020–24
- Tony Granato, player for three NHL teams, head coach of Colorado Avalanche 2002–04
- Bonita Granville, film actress and TV producer, Nancy Drew franchise, The Glass Key, Now, Voyager
- Laura Granville, professional tennis player, two-time NCAA champion
- Nick Gravenites, blues musician
- Catt Gravitt, songwriter
- Beatrice Gray, actress
- Charles McNeill Gray, candle maker, mayor of Chicago 1853–54 (born in New York)
- Clifford Gray, two-time gold medalist in 1932 Winter Olympics bobsled
- Dolores Gray, actress, Designing Woman, It's Always Fair Weather, Kismet, The Opposite Sex
- Glen Gray, bandleader and musician
- Harold Gray, creator of Little Orphan Annie
- Kenneth J. Gray, Air Force combat pilot, U.S. representative 1955–89
- William S. Gray, co-created Dick and Jane stories
- Eli Grba, MLB pitcher 1959–63

Gre–Grz

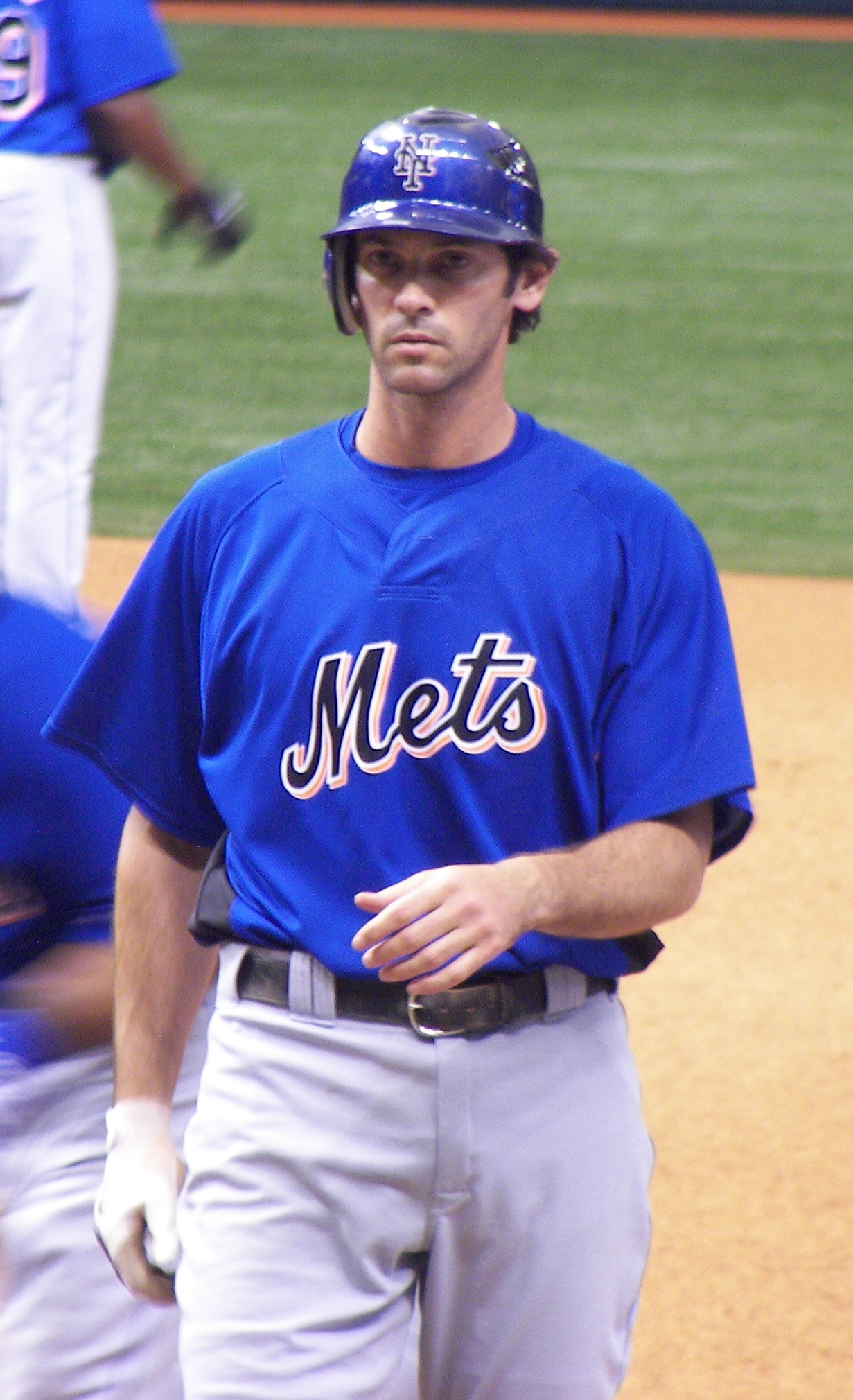
Shawn Green

- Andrew Greeley, Catholic priest, sociologist, columnist and author
- Chad Green, pitcher for New York Yankees (born in South Carolina)
- Dwight H. Green, 1941–49 Governor of Illinois, prosecutor of Al Capone (born in Indiana)
- Rickey Green, guard for eight NBA teams
- Shawn Green, MLB two-time All Star outfielder 1993–2007, had four-homer game
- Gus Greenbaum, Chicago gangster, ran Flamingo Las Vegas
- Seymour Greenberg, four-time US Open tennis quarterfinalist
- Robert Greenblatt, chairman of NBC television entertainment
- Dan Greenburg, author, husband of Nora Ephron
- Gene Greene, ragtime musician
- Kevin Greene, Hall of Fame linebacker for five NFL teams
- Shecky Greene, comedian and actor, Tony Rome, History of the World, Part I, Splash
- Ralph Greenleaf, pocket billiards Hall of Fame
- Sam Greenlee, novelist, government agent
- Luke Gregerson, MLB pitcher 2009–19, member of 2017 World Series champion Houston Astros
- Virginia Gregg, actress
- Rose Gregorio, Tony Award-nominated actress
- Brian Gregory, basketball head coach, Georgia Tech, Dayton, South Florida
- John Milton Gregory, first president of University of Illinois (born in New York)
- Wilton Daniel Gregory, archbishop of Washington
- Lori Greiner, TV personality, Shark Tank
- Matt Grevers, two-time relay gold medalist in 2008 Olympic Games, backstroke gold in 2012 Olympics
- Elmer Grey, architect of The Beverly Hills Hotel
- Tom Gries, director, Will Penny, 100 Rifles, Breakheart Pass
- Kenneth C. Griffin, financier, philanthropist (born in Florida)
- Johnny Griffin, bop sax musician
- Kathy Griffin, actress, Emmy-winning comedian, My Life on the D-List, Fashion Police
- Marion Mahony Griffin, pioneering architect
- Montell Griffin, boxer, WBC light-heavyweight champ
- Walter Burley Griffin, architect, associated with Frank Lloyd Wright
- Charles B. Griffith, screenwriter, The Little Shop of Horrors, Death Race 2000, Eat My Dust!
- Clark Griffith, baseball player, manager, owner in Hall of Fame (born in Missouri)
- Howard Griffith, NFL running back 1991–2001, eight-TD game for Illinois
- John L. Griffith, first commissioner of Big Ten Conference
- Rashard Griffith, pro basketball player
- Yolanda Griffith, 2000 and 2004 Olympic basketball gold medalist, eight-time WNBA All-Star, 1999 league MVP
- Boomer Grigsby, NFL fullback 2005–09
- Dennis Grimaldi, Broadway choreographer, producer
- Charlie Grimm, player and manager for Cubs (born in Missouri)
- Gary Groh, golfer
- Bob Groom, MLB pitcher 1909–18
- Mary Gross, actress, Saturday Night Live, Feds, The Couch Trip, Troop Beverly Hills
- Michael Gross, actor, Family Ties, Big Business, The Young and the Restless, Tremors
- Johnny Groth, MLB outfielder 1946–60
- Orval Grove, pitcher for White Sox 1940–49 (born in Kansas)
- Sophie Naylor Grubb, activist, writer, lecturer
- Johnny Gruelle, cartoonist, creator of Raggedy Ann
- Dov Grumet-Morris, professional ice hockey player
- Tim Grunhard, NFL center 1990–2000
- John M. Grunsfeld, astronaut and physicist
- Glen Grunwald, general manager of NBA's New York Knicks, Toronto Raptors

Gs–Gz

- Lisa Guerrero, model and television personality
- Ozzie Guillén, infielder, manager for White Sox (born in Venezuela)
- Charles J. Guiteau, assassin of President James A. Garfield
- John Guleserian, cinematographer
- Bill Gullickson, MLB pitcher 1979–94 (born in Minnesota)
- Bryant Gumbel, television journalist (born in Louisiana)
- Greg Gumbel, television sportscaster (born in Louisiana)
- Frank W. Gunsaulus, educator, orator and minister (born in Ohio)
- Charles F. Gunther, confectioner, introduced CrackerJack (born in Germany)
- John Gunther, foreign correspondent and author
- Larry Gura, pitcher for Kansas City Royals and Chicago Cubs
- Walter S. Gurnee, tannery owner, mayor of Chicago 1851–53; Gurnee named for him (born in New York)
- Andy Gustafson, football coach, Virginia Tech, Miami
- Frankie Gustine, MLB infielder 1939–50
- Luke Guthrie, golfer
- Luis Gutiérrez, politician (Democrat), U.S. representative 1993–2019
- Buddy Guy, blues guitarist, Grammy Lifetime Achievement Award
- A.J. Guyton, basketball player
- Boone Guyton, test pilot, aviation pioneer
- Brad Guzan, pro soccer goalkeeper

== H ==
Haa–Ham

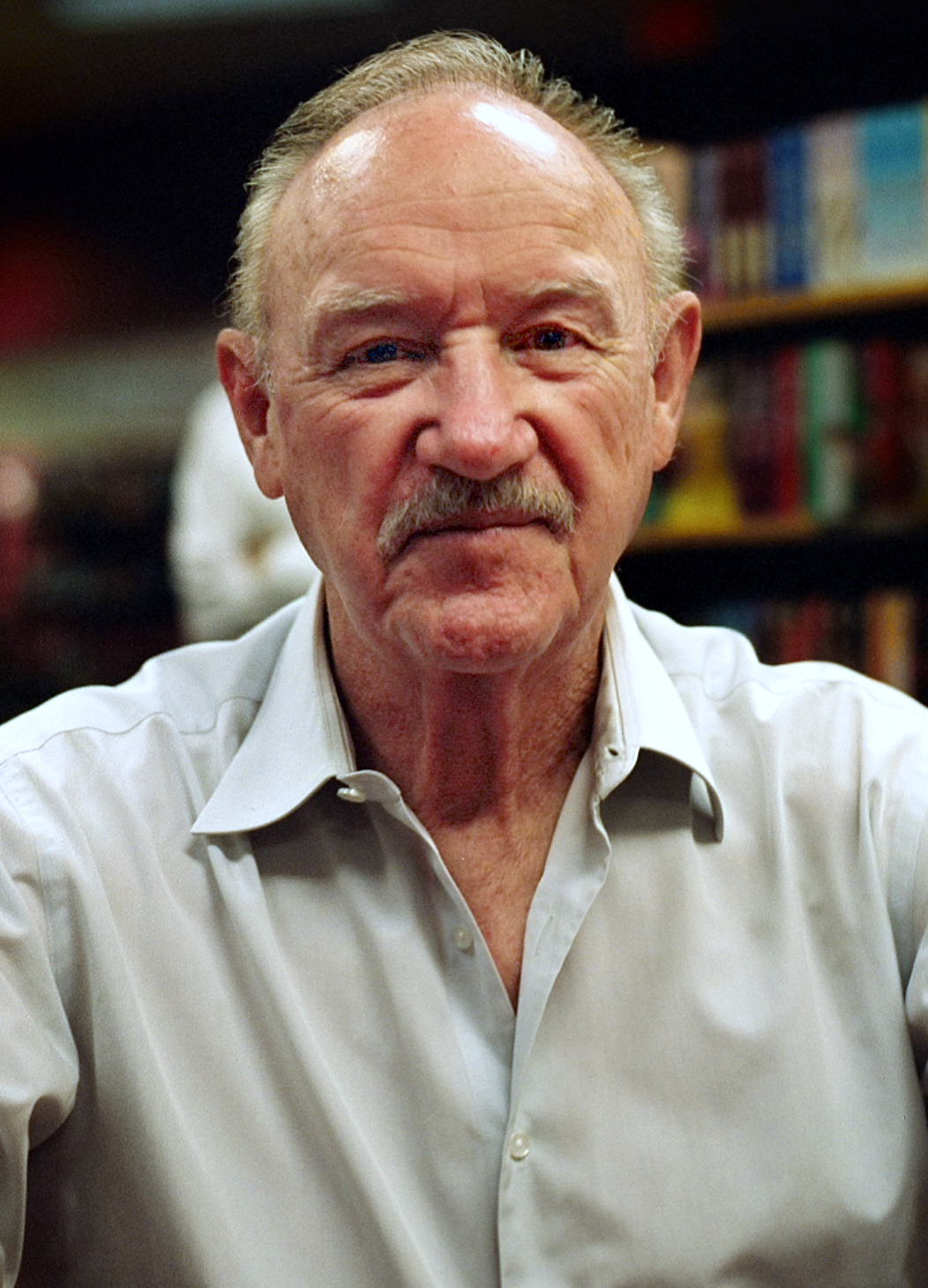
Gene Hackman

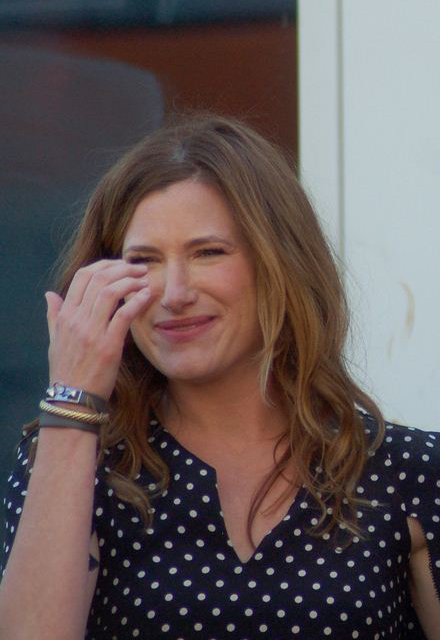
Kathryn Hahn

- Bert Haas, MLB first baseman 1937–51
- Carl Haas, auto racing executive (born in Germany)
- Jay Haas, pro golfer, nine-time PGA Tour winner (born in Missouri)
- Jerry Haas, pro golfer, college coach
- Stan Hack, player and manager for Chicago Cubs (born in California)
- Warren Hacker, MLB pitcher 1948–61
- Gene Hackman, Oscar-winning actor, The French Connection, Superman, Hoosiers, Unforgiven (born in California)
- H. G. Hadden, 1895 football player-coach for Notre Dame
- Jerry Hadley, operatic tenor
- Mickey Haefner, MLB pitcher 1943–50
- Jean Hagen, Oscar-nominated actress, Singin' in the Rain, Adam's Rib, The Asphalt Jungle, Make Room for Daddy
- Kevin Hagen, actor, Little House on the Prairie
- Hager Twins, country music duo
- Michael G. Hagerty, actor, Lucky Louie, Friends
- Tyjuan Hagler, NFL player
- Kathryn Hahn, actress, Crossing Jordan, Step Brothers, We're the Millers, Glass Onion, WandaVision
- Rick Hahn, general manager of Chicago White Sox 2012–23
- John Charles Haines, water commissioner, mayor of Chicago 1858–60 (born in New York)
- Jerry Hairston Jr., baseball player for nine MLB teams
- George Halas, co-founder of National Football League, coach-owner of Chicago Bears, member of Pro Football Hall of Fame
- George Halas Jr., president of Chicago Bears 1963–79
- Walter Halas, basketball coach, Notre Dame, Drexel
- Barbara Hale, Emmy-winning actress, Della Street on Perry Mason
- DeMarlo Hale, MLB bench coach
- George E. Hale, astronomer
- Arthur R. Hall, football player and coach for Illinois
- Bryan Hall, pro football player 2011–17
- Buddy Hall, pocket billiards Hall of Fame
- Edward K. Hall, football and baseball coach for Illinois
- Glenn Hall, 10-year Hall of Fame goalie for Blackhawks (born in Canada)
- Lani Hall, singer, wife of Herb Alpert
- Gary Hallberg, pro golfer, sixth in 1985 Masters
- Bill Haller, Major League Baseball umpire
- Tom Haller, MLB catcher, coach, executive
- Brett Halliday, mystery writer
- Lin Halliday, saxophonist (born in Arkansas)
- Robert Halperin, Olympic yachting medalist, football player, World War II hero, chairman of Commercial Light Co.
- Victor Halperin, film director, White Zombie
- Halston, fashion designer (born in Iowa)
- Roy Hamey, general manager of New York Yankees 1960–63
- Dorothy Hamill, figure skater, gold medalist in 1976 Winter Olympics and 1976 world champion
- Earl Hamilton, MLB pitcher 1911–24
- Frank Hamilton, singer with The Weavers
- John B. Hamilton, U.S. Surgeon General 1879–91
- John Marshall Hamilton, attorney, Governor of Illinois 1883–85 (born in Ohio)
- Todd Hamilton, pro golfer, winner of 2004 British Open
- Penny Hammel, pro golfer, winner of 1983 NCAA championship
- Richard Hamming, prominent mathematician, inventor of Hamming code and Hamming window
- John Hammond, general manager of Orlando Magic, Milwaukee Bucks
- Laurens Hammond, inventor of Hammond organ
- Dan Hampton, Hall of Fame defensive end for Chicago Bears (born in Arkansas)

Han–Har

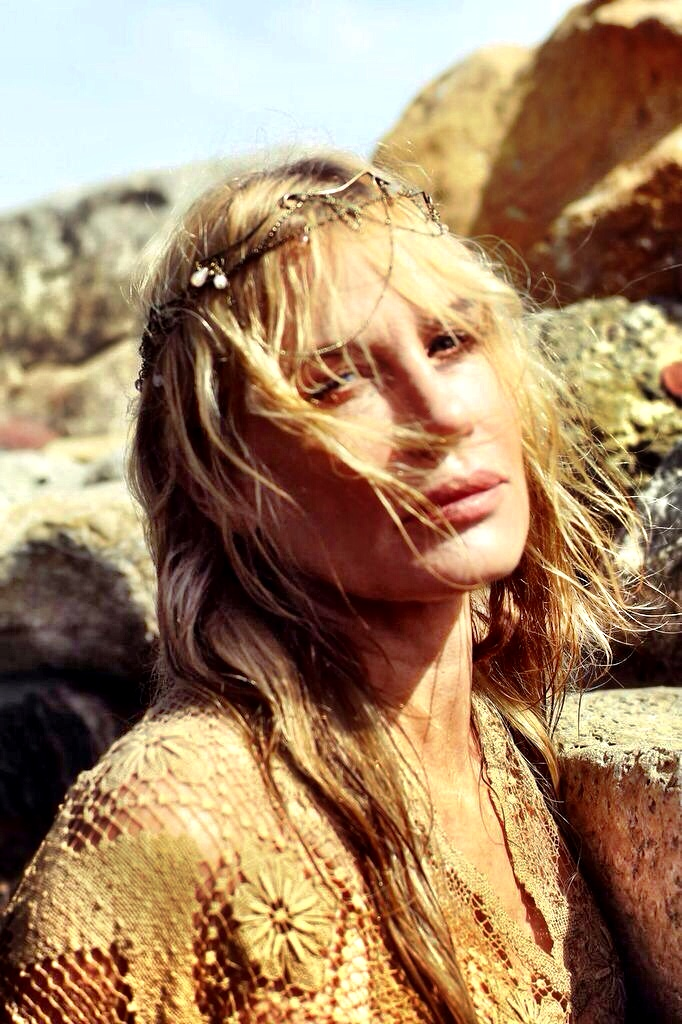
Daryl Hannah

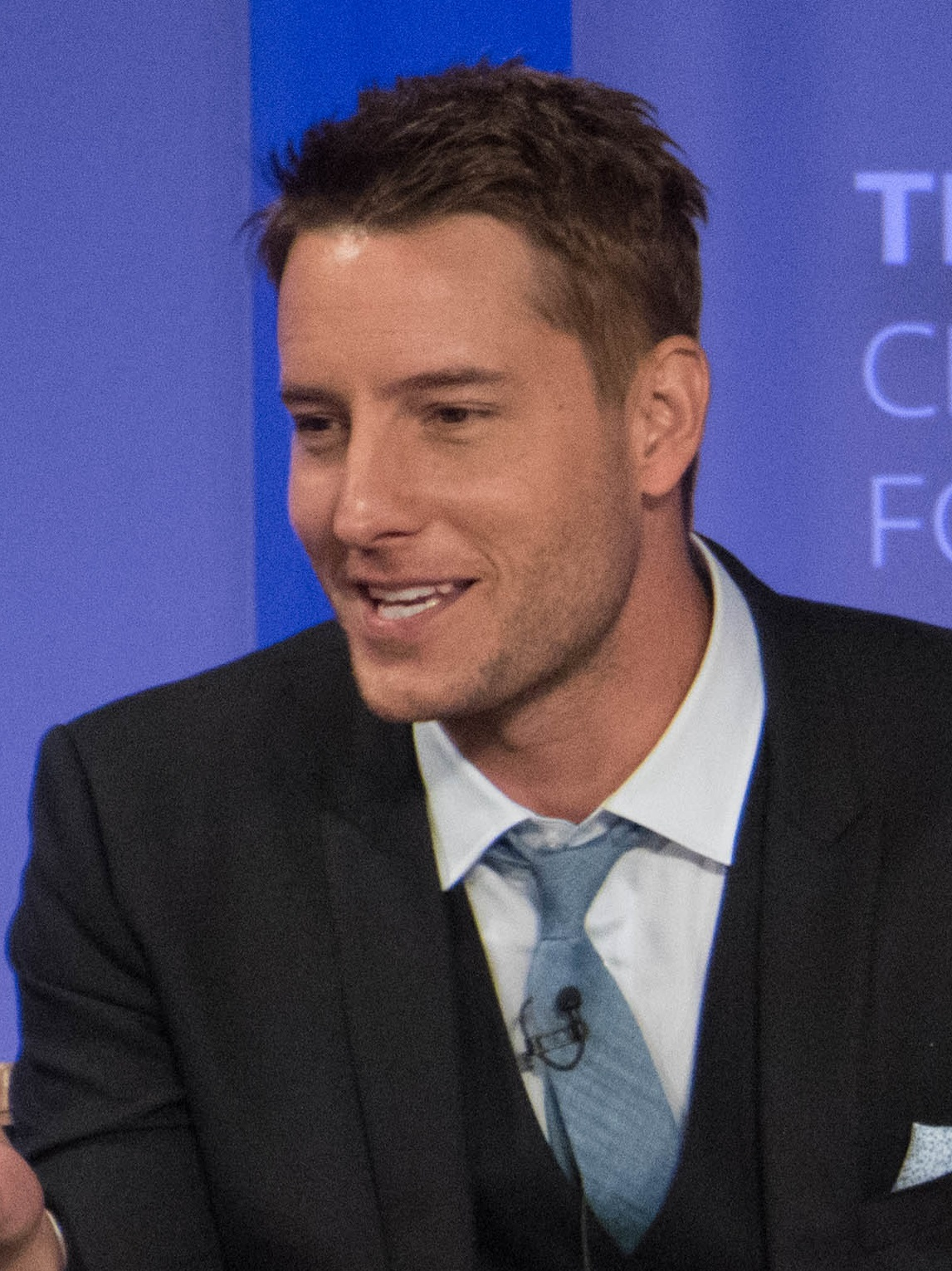
Justin Hartley

- Herbie Hancock, jazz musician, Grammy and Oscar winner
- Elliot Handler, co-founder of Mattel toy company
- Phil Handler, NFL player and coach
- Jam Handy, Olympic swimmer (born in Pennsylvania)
- Daryl Hannah, actress, Splash, Blade Runner, Wall Street, Steel Magnolias, Kill Bill
- Page Hannah, philanthropist and actress, Shag, Fame
- Lorraine Hansberry, playwright, A Raisin in the Sun
- Henry C. Hansbrough, U.S. senator of North Dakota 1891–1909
- Brian Hansen, speed skater, 2010 Winter Olympics silver medalist
- Chris Hansen, television journalist
- Joseph T. Hansen, labor leader
- Myrna Hansen, 1953 Miss USA, actress
- Mark Victor Hansen, co-creator of Chicken Soup for the Soul
- Snipe Hansen, MLB pitcher 1930–35
- Ray Hanson, football coach, Western Illinois 1926–41 (born in Minnesota)
- Robert Hanssen, FBI agent convicted of espionage
- Norman Hapgood, editor, ambassador to Denmark 1919
- J. A. Happ, MLB relief pitcher 2007–21
- Luke Harangody, pro basketball player, 2008 Big East Player of the Year
- Clay Harbor, NFL tight end 2010–17
- James Harbord, World War I general, chairman of RCA
- Tim Hardaway, NBA player 1989–2003 and 2000 Sydney Olympics gold medalist
- Abner C. Harding, Civil War officer, U.S. representative (born in Connecticut)
- Cory Hardrict, actor, American Sniper, The Outpost
- Phil Hare, U.S. representative 2007–11
- Alan Hargesheimer, MLB pitcher 1980–86
- Cory Harkey, NFL tight end 2012–16
- James Harlan, Iowa senator, U.S. secretary of the interior, son-in-law of Abraham Lincoln
- John Marshall Harlan II, justice of U.S. Supreme Court 1955–71
- Chic Harley, running back, College Football Hall of Fame
- Jean Harlow, actress, Lake Forest student (born in Missouri)
- Deborah Harmon, actress, Just the Ten of Us, Used Cars
- Merle Harmon, sports broadcaster
- Reginald C. Harmon, Air Force general
- Ann Harnett, pro baseball player
- Elise Harney, pro baseball player
- Sheldon Harnick, lyricist, Fiddler on the Roof
- Erika Harold, model, 2003 Miss America, conservative activist, attorney
- Dawn Harper, hurdler, gold medalist in 2008 Beijing Olympics
- Jesse Harper, football coach for Notre Dame 1913–17
- Jessica Harper, actress, My Favorite Year, Stardust Memories, Pennies from Heaven, Suspiria
- Michael Harper, basketball player, North Park and Portland Trail Blazers
- William Rainey Harper, first president of University of Chicago and Bradley (born in Ohio)
- Ken Harrelson, baseball player, executive, broadcaster (born in South Carolina)
- Will Harridge, president of baseball's American League 1931–59
- Arne Harris, television sports producer
- Barbara Harris, Oscar-nominated actress, Nashville, Plaza Suite, Family Plot, Freaky Friday
- E.B. Harris, 25-year president of Chicago Mercantile Exchange
- Eddie Harris, saxophonist
- Emily Harris, kidnapper of Patty Hearst
- Harry Harris, boxer
- Janet Harris, member of Women's Basketball Hall of Fame
- Moira Harris, actress, One More Saturday Night, Breakdown, wife of Gary Sinise
- Napoleon Harris, linebacker in NFL, member of Illinois Senate
- Patricia Roberts Harris, diplomat, Cabinet member of President Jimmy Carter
- Paul P. Harris, founder of Rotary International (born in Wisconsin)
- Robin Harris, comedian and actor, House Party, Do the Right Thing
- Steve Harris, actor, The Practice, Diary of a Mad Black Woman
- Sydney J. Harris, syndicated columnist (born in England)
- Wood Harris, actor, The Wire, Ant-Man, Creed films
- Carter Harrison III, politician (Democrat), U.S. representative, mayor of Chicago 1879–1887, 1893 (born in Kentucky)
- Carter Harrison IV, politician (Democrat), mayor of Chicago 1897–1905, 1911–15
- Nolan Harrison, NFL defensive end 1991–2000
- Rodney Harrison, NFL defensive back, won two Super Bowls with New England Patriots
- Dolores Hart, actress, Loving You, Lonelyhearts, Sail a Crooked Ship, Where the Boys Are
- Jim Hart, quarterback for NFL's St. Louis Cardinals 1966–83
- Pearl M. Hart, attorney and activist
- Justin Hartley, actor, Passions, The Young and the Restless, Smallville
- Mary Hartline, television personality, Super Circus
- Johnny Hartman, jazz singer (born in Louisiana)
- Gabby Hartnett, Hall of Fame catcher for Chicago Cubs (born in Rhode Island)
- Lynne Cooper Harvey, radio producer (born in Missouri)
- Paul Harvey, radio personality, Chicago-based for more than 60 years (born in Oklahoma)

Has–Haz

- Karen Hasara, politician (Republican), first female mayor of Springfield
- Dennis Hastert, teacher, politician (Republican), U.S. representative, speaker of the House 1998–2006, imprisoned 2016
- Wilbur Hatch, bandleader, I Love Lucy
- Donny Hathaway, singer, "Where Is the Love"
- Helge Alexander Haugan, businessman, banker (born in Norway)
- H. (Hauman) G. Haugan, railroad executive, brother of Helge A. Haugan (born in Norway)
- Reidar Rye Haugan, newspaper publisher (born in Norway)
- Enid A. Haupt, magazine publisher, philanthropist
- Herbert Hans Haupt, executed spy (born in Germany)
- June Haver, actress, The Daughter of Rosie O'Grady, The Dolly Sisters, Look for the Silver Lining, wife of Fred MacMurray
- Brent Hawkins, pro football player 2006–13
- Coleman Hawkins, saxophonist (born in Missouri)
- Fred Hawkins, golfer, co-runner-up in 1958 Masters
- Hersey Hawkins, guard for five NBA teams
- LaRoyce Hawkins, actor, Chicago P.D.
- Tom Hawkins, basketball player, baseball executive
- John Hay, secretary to Abe Lincoln, U.S. Secretary of State under William McKinley and Theodore Roosevelt (born in Indiana)
- Kelvin Hayden, NFL cornerback 2005–14, won Super Bowl XLI
- Julie Haydon, actress, The Scoundrel, The Conquerors
- Bernadene Hayes, actress, Idiot's Delight, Dick Tracy's Dilemma
- Bill Hayes, actor, Days of Our Lives
- Billie Hayes, actress, Li'l Abner
- Charles Hayes, union official, U.S. representative 1983–93
- Reggie Hayes, actor, Girlfriends
- Sean Hayes, Emmy-winning actor, Will & Grace, The Bucket List, Martin and Lewis, The Three Stooges
- Kathryn Hays, actress, As the World Turns
- Reggie Hayward, NFL defensive end 2001–09
- Hurley Haywood, auto racer in Motorsports Hall of Fame of America

He–Hh

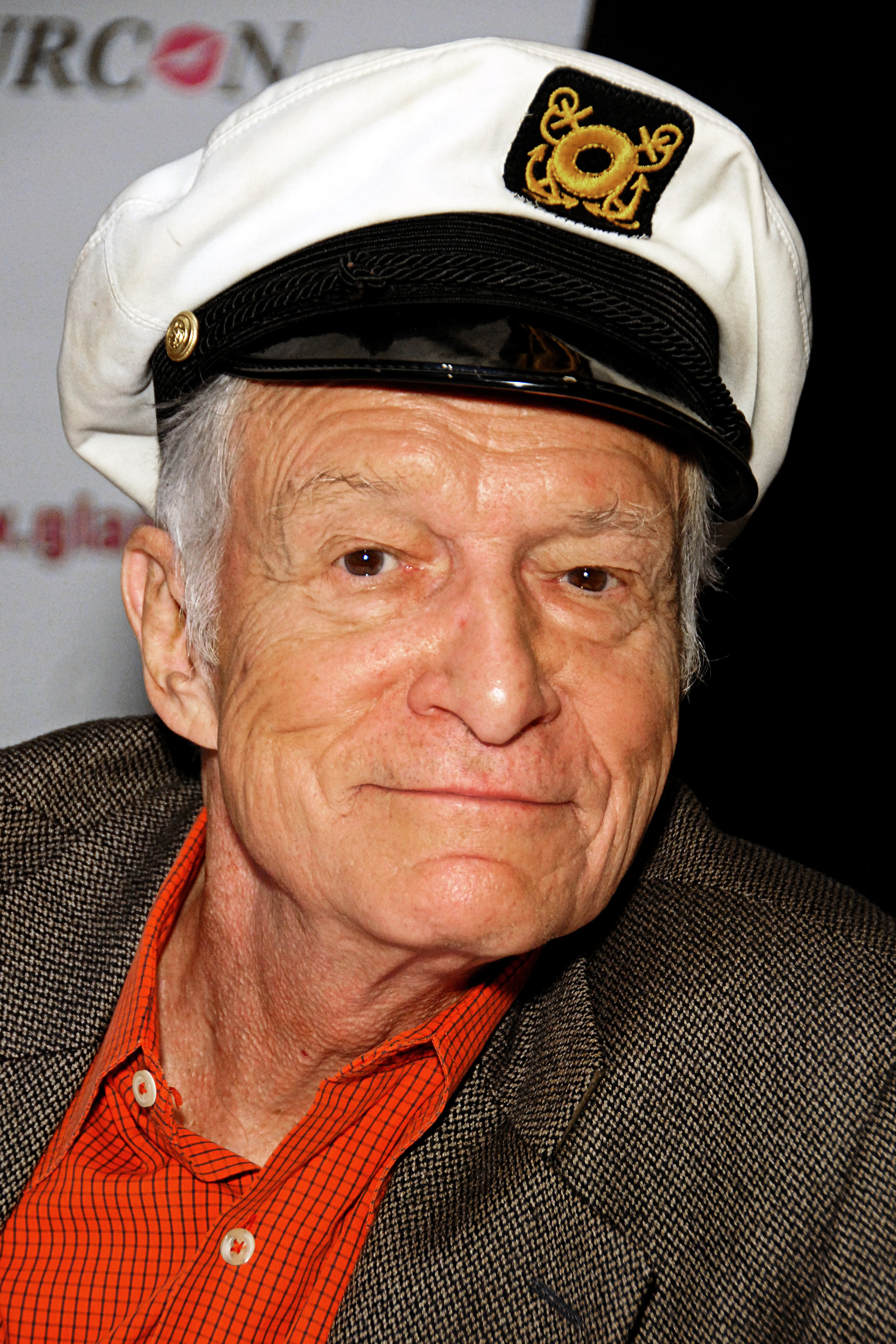
Hugh Hefner

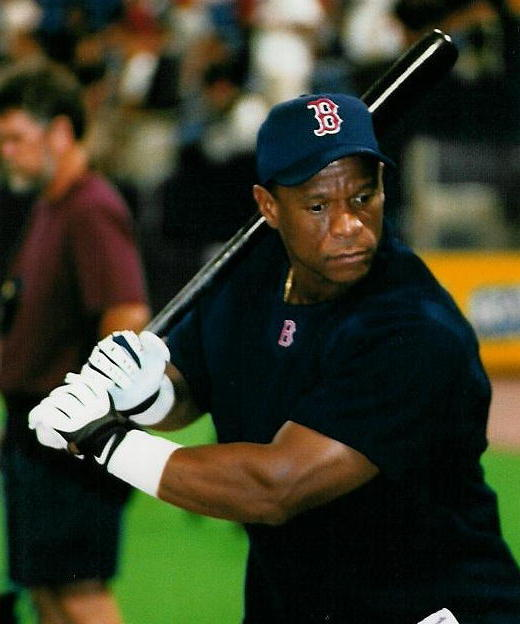
Rickey Henderson

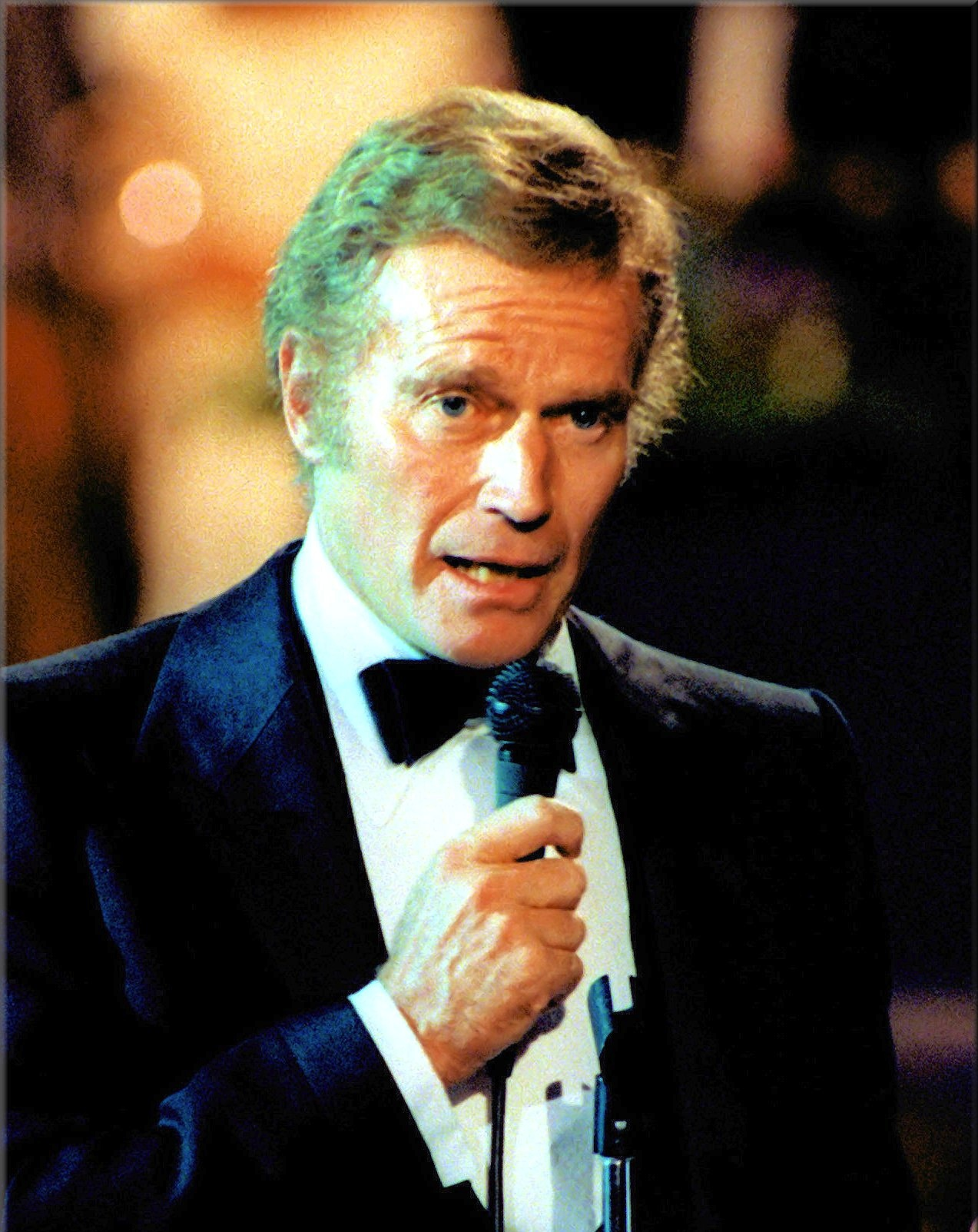
Charlton Heston

- Luther Head, basketball player, 2005 Illinois national runners-up
- Nathan Heald, commandant of Fort Dearborn 1810–12 (born in New Hampshire)
- Egyptian Healy, 19th-century pitcher
- George Peter Alexander Healy, painter (born in Massachusetts)
- Pat Healy, actor, Station 19, Draft Day
- Jane Heap, writer and publisher (born in Kansas)
- Chick Hearn, Hall of Fame basketball broadcaster for Los Angeles Lakers
- Monroe Heath, politician (Republican), mayor of Chicago 1876–79 (born in New Hampshire)
- Erin Heatherton, fashion model
- Harry Hebner, three-time Olympian, 1912 backstroke gold medalist
- Ben Hecht, reporter, war correspondent, activist, playwright, director, Oscar-winning screenwriter
- Bobby "The Brain" Heenan, professional wrestler, manager, TV commentator
- Kyle T. Heffner, actor, Flashdance, When Harry Met Sally..., Runaway Train
- Richard T. Heffron, director, I, the Jury, Futureworld, Outlaw Blues
- Christie Hefner, former Playboy company CEO
- Hugh Hefner, magazine publisher, founder of Playboy
- James V. Heidinger, U.S. representative 1941–45
- Mike Heimerdinger, assistant coach for Denver Broncos and Tennessee Titans
- Don Heinrich, NFL quarterback 1953–62 and coach, College Football Hall of Fame
- Ryan Held, swimmer, 2016 Summer Olympics gold medalist
- Marg Helgenberger, actress, Northwestern alumna, CSI (born in Nebraska)
- William Heirens, convicted murderer, served 65 years in prison
- James Meredith Helm, admiral, Spanish–American War
- Ernest Hemingway, iconic author, Pulitzer and Nobel Prize-winning journalist and novelist
- Grace Hall Hemingway, opera singer, mother of Ernest Hemingway
- Terri Hemmert, Chicago radio personality (born in Ohio)
- Bill Henderson, jazz singer, actor, Clue, City Slickers
- Rickey Henderson, Hall of Fame outfielder, holds MLB record for career stolen bases
- Thomas J. Henderson, Civil War general, U.S. representative (born in Tennessee)
- Jack Hendricks, manager of Cincinnati Reds 1924–29
- Sue Hendrickson, paleontologist, discoverer of Sue the dinosaur
- Tim Hendryx, MLB outfielder 1911–21
- Max Henius, biochemist, co-founder of American Academy of Brewing
- Marilu Henner, actress, author, Taxi, Evening Shade, Noises Off, Johnny Dangerously, L.A. Story
- Anne Henning, speed skater, 1992 Olympic gold medalist (born in North Carolina)
- John W. Henry, businessman and investor, owner of Boston Red Sox and The Boston Globe
- Ken Henry, speed skater, gold medalist in 1952 Winter Olympics
- Roy Henshaw, MLB pitcher 1933–44
- Kelley Menighan Hensley, actress, As the World Turns
- Lou Henson, 21-year head coach of Illinois basketball (born in Oklahoma)
- Craig Hentrich, NFL punter 1993–2009
- Herblock (Herbert Block), cartoonist, winner of three Pulitzer Prizes
- William Herndon, law partner and biographer of Abe Lincoln, mayor of Springfield
- James B. Herrick, physician who discovered sickle-cell disease
- Clarence Herschberger, All-American athlete for University of Chicago 1894–98
- Seymour Hersh, Pulitzer-winning investigative journalist
- John D. Hertz, founder of Yellow Cab Company and The Hertz Corporation (born in Hungary)
- Whitey Herzog, outfielder, Hall of Fame baseball manager, primarily with St. Louis Cardinals
- Charlton Heston, Oscar-winning actor, political activist, The Ten Commandments, Ben-Hur, El Cid, The Greatest Show on Earth, The Agony and the Ecstasy, Touch of Evil, Planet of the Apes
- Willie Heston, halfback, College Football Hall of Fame

Hi–Hn

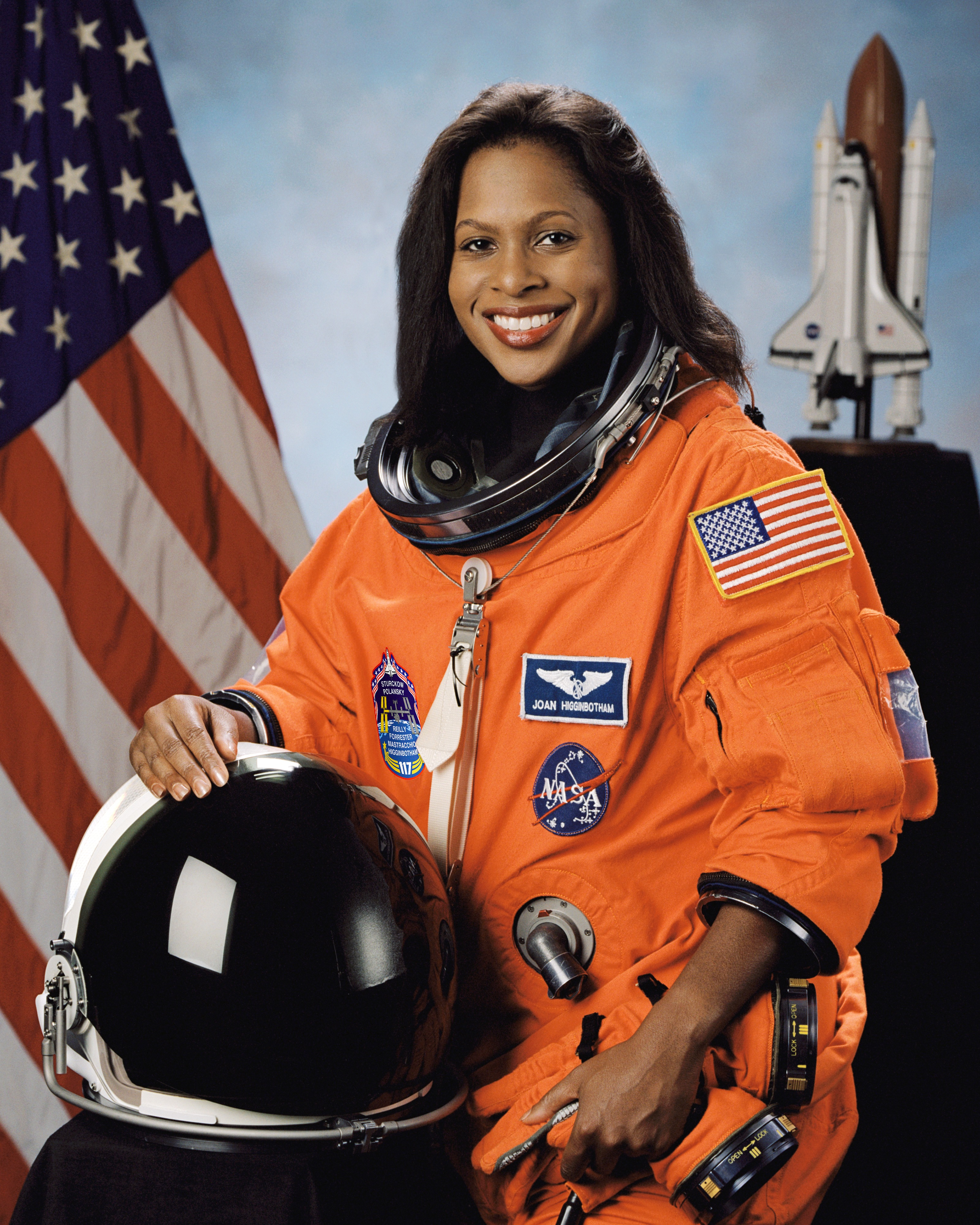
Joan Higginbotham

- John Grier Hibben, president of Princeton University 1912–32
- Jesse Hibbs, football player for USC, film and TV director
- Jim Hickey, MLB pitching coach
- Kevin Hickey, pitcher for White Sox and Baltimore Orioles
- Fred Hickman, sportscaster
- Wild Bill Hickok, Wild West gunfighter and lawman, depicted in The Plainsman, Calamity Jane, Wild Bill
- Ronald Aldon Hicks, bishop of Joliet
- Hal Higdon, runner and writer
- Joan Higginbotham, astronaut
- Jarad Higgins, hip-hop musician and songwriter
- Jack Higgins, cartoonist, 1989 Pulitzer Prize winner
- Joel Higgins, actor, Silver Spoons
- Rod Higgins, forward for seven NBA tams, executive for Charlotte Hornets
- Andy High, MLB third baseman 1922–34
- Nat Hiken, creator, Car 54, Where Are You?, The Phil Silvers Show
- Ernest Hilgard, psychologist
- Nick Hill, football head coach, Southern Illinois
- Virginia Hill, moll to Chicago Outfit mob (born in Alabama)
- Homer Hillebrand, MLB player 1905–08
- Chuck Hiller, MLB player, hit grand slam home run in 1962 World Series
- Charles T. Hinde, founder of Hotel del Coronado (born in Ohio)
- Harry Hinde, Missouri politician, aircraft designer
- Thomas S. Hinde, founder of Mount Carmel, friend of Mark Twain
- Earl Hines, jazz musician (born in Pennsylvania)
- Garrett Hines, bobsled silver medalist at 2002 Salt Lake City Olympics
- Tony Hinkle, basketball coach (born in Indiana)
- Chris Hinton, tackle for Indianapolis Colts and Atlanta Falcons
- Milt Hinton, jazz musician (born in Mississippi)
- Edward Hirsch, poet and critic
- Lew Hitch, won two NBA championships with Minneapolis Lakers
- Michael Hitchcock, actor, MADtv, Wild Hogs, Glee (born in Ohio)
- Les Hite, bandleader
- Robert R. Hitt, U.S. representative 1882–1906 (born in Ohio)

Ho–Ht

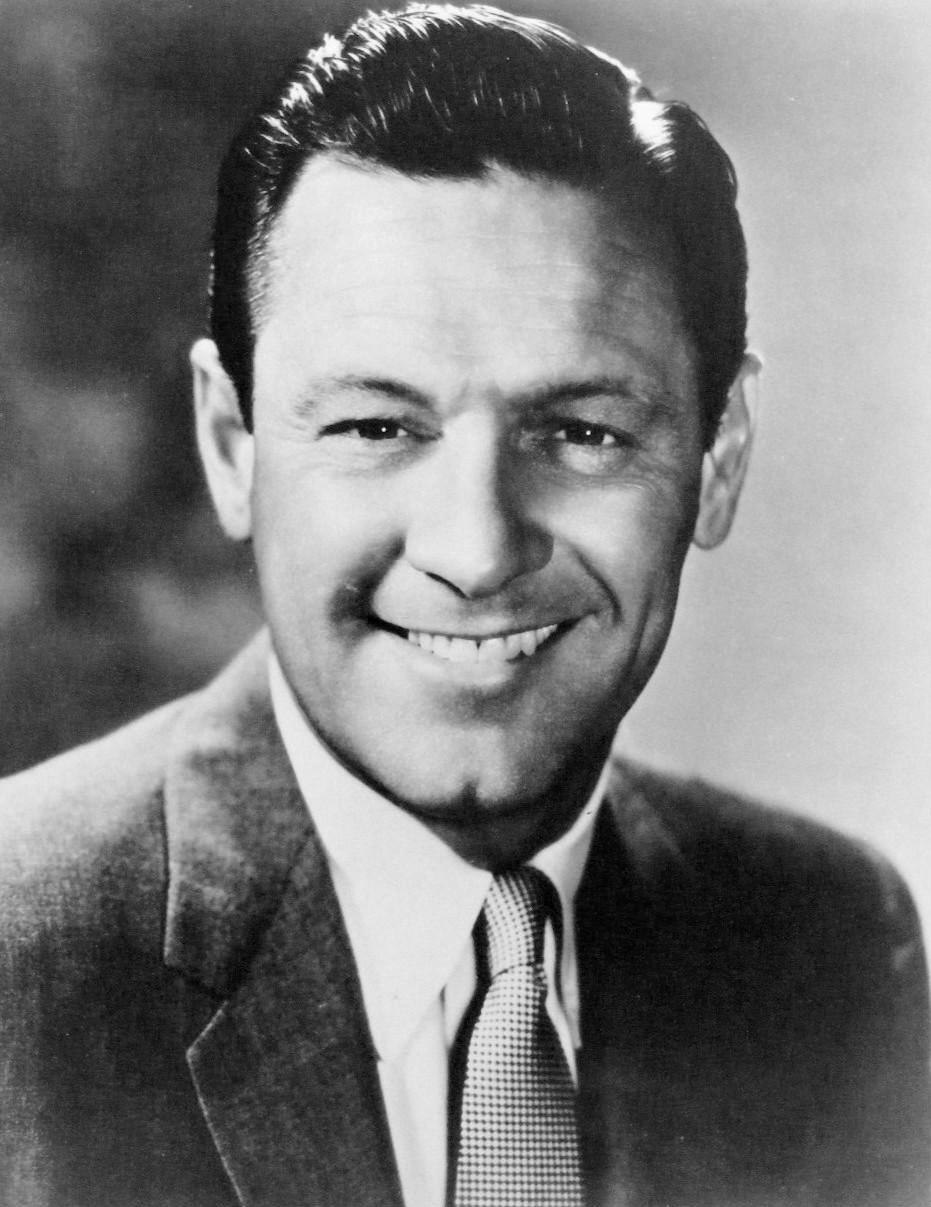
William Holden

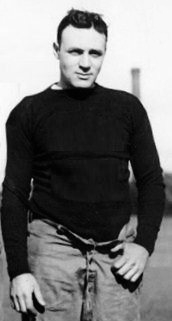
Ralph Horween

- Edward Francis Hoban, archbishop of Cleveland, Ohio 1945–66
- Glen Hobbie, pitcher for Chicago Cubs 1957–64
- Mellody Hobson, executive, chairperson of DreamWorks Animation, married to George Lucas
- Nathan Hodel, NFL center 2001–09
- Art Hodes, jazz pianist (born in Ukraine)
- John R. Hodge, commanding general of U.S. Third Army
- Craig Hodges, NBA guard, primarily with Milwaukee Bucks and Chicago Bulls
- Reggie Hodges, NFL punter 2005–12
- Tom Hoff, volleyball player, gold medalist in 2008 Beijing Olympics
- Guy Hoffman, pitcher in MLB and Japan
- Julius Hoffman, judge in trial of Chicago Seven
- Isabella Hofmann, actress, Dear John, Homicide: Life on the Street, JAG
- Paul G. Hoffman, auto executive and statesman
- James F. Hoge Jr., editor and publisher of Chicago Sun-Times, New York Daily News
- Helen E. Hokinson, cartoonist for The New Yorker
- William Holabird, architect (born in New York)
- Stu Holcomb, GM of White Sox and Chicago Mustangs soccer, Northwestern athletic director
- Charles C. P. Holden, 19th-century politician (born in New Hampshire)
- Jennifer Holden, actress, Buchanan Rides Alone, Jailhouse Rock
- William Holden, Oscar-winning actor, Stalag 17, Sunset Boulevard, Born Yesterday, The Bridge on the River Kwai, Picnic, The Wild Bunch, Network
- John Holecek, NFL linebacker 1995–2002, coach at Loyola Academy
- Tony Holguin, golfer
- Nicole Hollander, creator of comic strip Sylvia
- Mabel Holle, baseball player
- Robert W. Holley, biochemist, 1968 Nobel Prize
- Loleatta Holloway, singer
- Red Holloway, jazz musician
- Celeste Holm, Oscar-winning actress, Gentleman's Agreement, All About Eve (born in New York)
- Andre Holmes, NFL wide receiver 2011–18
- H. H. Holmes, serial killer (born in New Hampshire)
- Mary Emma Holmes, reformer, suffragist, and educator
- Phyllis Holmes, basketball coach, Women's Basketball Hall of Fame
- Richaun Holmes, NBA forward
- Nick Holonyak, engineer and educator
- Lester Holt, Chicago newscaster 1986–2000, NBC News anchor (born in California)
- Redd Holt, jazz drummer
- Stefan Holt, Chicago newscaster, son of Lester Holt
- Jerome Holtzman, baseball writer and historian
- Ken Holtzman, pitcher for University of Illinois, Cubs, Oakland A's, three-time World Series winner
- Joseph R. Holzapple, U.S. Air Force four-star general
- Dianne Holum, speed skater, Olympic gold medalist
- James Holzhauer, TV game show champion, Jeopardy!
- Skip Homeier, actor, The Gunfighter, The Tall T, Comanche Station
- Gene Honda, announcer
- John Honnold, professor at University of Pennsylvania Law School
- Hector Honore, auto racer (born in Kansas)
- Henry Honore, 19th-century real estate baron (born in Kentucky)
- Ida Marie Honore, socialite, daughter-in-law of Ulysses S. Grant (born in Kentucky)
- Raymond Hood, architect of Tribune Tower and Rockefeller Center (born in Rhode Island)
- Jay Hook, MLB pitcher 1957–64
- Michael Hoomanawanui, NFL tight end 2010–18, member of Super Bowl XLIX champion New England Patriots
- Albert J. Hopkins, U.S. representative 1885–1903, U.S. senator 1903–09
- Brad Hopkins, NFL offensive tackle 1993–2005 (born in South Carolina)
- Fred Hopkins, jazz musician
- John Patrick Hopkins, politician (Democrat), mayor of Chicago 1893–95 (born in New York)
- Michael S. Hopkins, astronaut, Illinois football player (born in Missouri)
- Jeff Hornacek, NBA player 1986–2000, head coach of New York Knicks, Phoenix Suns
- Henry Horner, politician (Democrat), Governor of Illinois 1933–40
- Rogers Hornsby, Hall of Fame infielder, manager for Chicago Cubs (born in Texas)
- Big Walter Horton, harmonica player in Blues Hall of Fame
- Kathleen Horvath, pro tennis player
- Arnold Horween, All-American for Harvard, NFL player
- Ralph Horween, All-American for Harvard, NFL player
- Frances Horwich, television personality, Miss Frances, host of Ding Dong School
- Tanner Houck, MLB pitcher
- Stanley Hough, horse racing trainer
- Lin Houston, guard for 1950 NFL champion Cleveland Browns
- Charles Edward Hovey, Civil War general, Peoria school superintendent, first president of Illinois State (born in Vermont)
- Richard Hovey, poet
- Del Howard, won 1907 and 1908 World Series with Chicago Cubs
- Juwan Howard, forward for Michigan and eight NBA teams; two championships with Miami Heat, head coach at Michigan
- Margaret Howard, countess
- Margo Howard, writer, daughter of Ann Landers (born in Iowa)
- Miki Howard, singer
- Terrence Howard, Oscar-nominated actor, Hustle & Flow, Iron Man, Crash, Big Momma's House, The Butler, Empire
- Tom Howard, photographer
- Dick Howell, swimmer, 1924 Summer Olympics relay gold medalist
- George Evan Howell, judge, U.S. representative 1941–47
- Yvonne Howell, actress, wife of director George Stevens
- Howlin' Wolf, Chicago blues musician in Rock and Roll Hall of Fame (born in Mississippi)

Hu–Hz

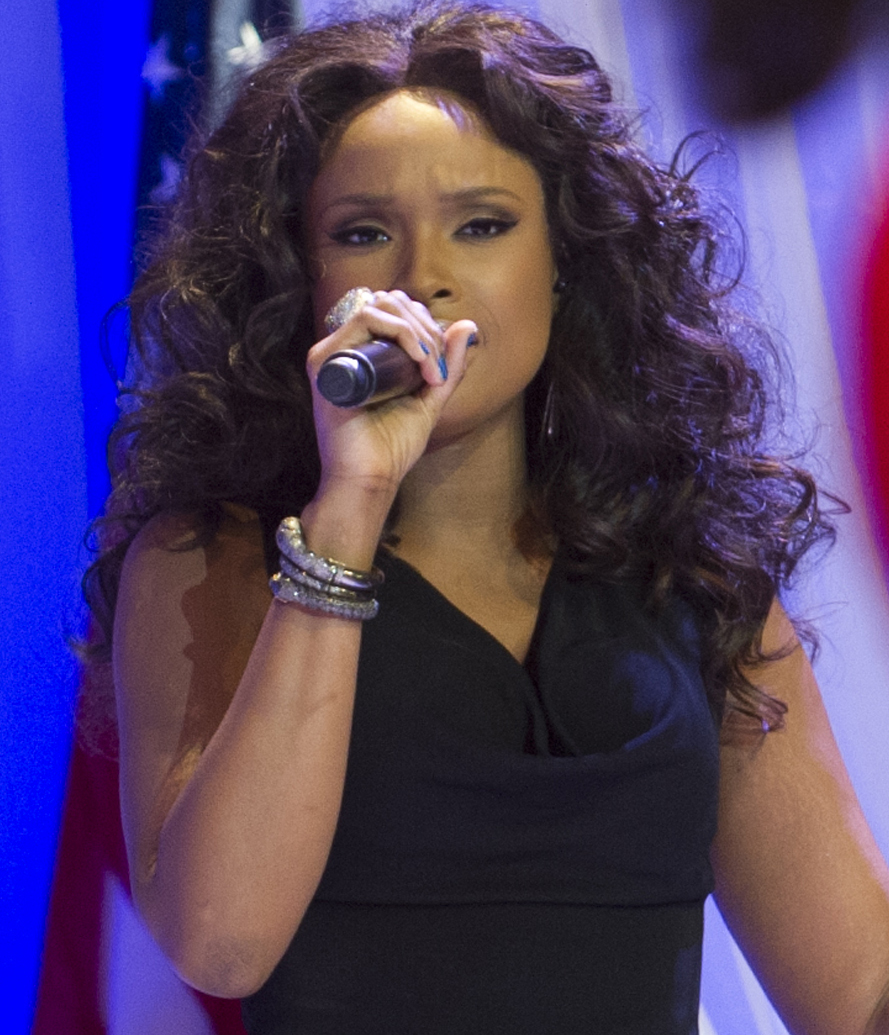
Jennifer Hudson

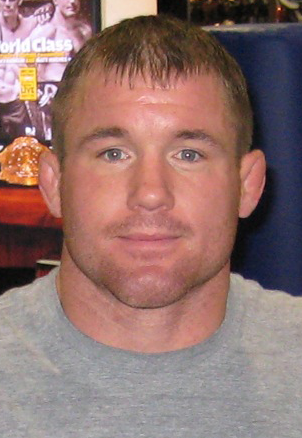
Matt Hughes

- Elbert Hubbard, writer, died on RMS Lusitania
- Trenidad Hubbard, MLB outfielder 1994–2003
- Edwin Hubble, astronomer (born in Missouri)
- Janet Hubert, singer, actress, Fresh Prince of Bel Air
- Kelli Hubly, pro soccer player
- Winnifred Mason Huck, first Illinois woman in Congress
- Reginald Hudlin, film director, producer, The Great White Hype, Django Unchained
- Warrington Hudlin, film director, producer, House Party, Boomerang
- Jennifer Hudson, TV personality, Grammy-winning R&B singer, Oscar-winning actress, Dreamgirls
- Michael Hudson, economist
- Otis Hudson, NFL lineman 2010–14
- Rock Hudson, Oscar-nominated actor, Giant, Magnificent Obsession, Pillow Talk, A Farewell to Arms, Ice Station Zebra, McMillan and Wife
- Troy Hudson, NBA guard 1998–2008
- George Huff, 19th-century football and baseball coach for Illinois, athletic director 1901–35
- Brandon Hughes, NFL cornerback 2009–14
- Carol Hughes, actress, Flash Gordon Conquers the Universe
- Jim Hughes, MLB pitcher 1952–57
- John Hughes, director, producer, screenwriter, Ferris Bueller's Day Off, The Breakfast Club, Home Alone (born in Michigan)
- John R. Hughes, cowboy, trail driver, Texas Ranger
- Kim Hughes, pro basketball center and coach
- Mary Beth Hughes, actress, The Ox-Bow Incident, Dressed to Kill, Caged Fury, Loophole, The Lady Confesses
- Matt Hughes, mixed martial artist, UFC Hall of Fame
- Pat Hughes, baseball broadcaster (born in Arizona)
- Robert Hughes, NFL and Notre Dame fullback
- Tom Hughes, MLB pitcher 1900–13
- Wayne Huizenga, founder of Blockbuster video, owned Miami Dolphins, Florida Marlins
- William Hulbert, baseball pioneer, president of Chicago White Stockings, who became the Cubs (born in New York)
- Tim Hulett, MLB player and coach
- Bobby Hull, Hall of Fame wing for Chicago Blackhawks (born in Canada)
- Morton D. Hull, lawyer, U.S. representative 1923–33
- William E. Hull, postmaster of Peoria, U.S. representative 1923–33
- Robert Leo Hulseman, president of Solo Cup Company
- Randy Hultgren, U.S. representative 2011–19
- Edward Hume, TV writer, The Day After
- Paul Hume, music critic
- Rick Hummel, baseball writer
- Todd Hundley, catcher for several MLB teams (born in Virginia)
- Murray Humphreys, organized crime figure
- William L. Hungate, U.S. representative of Missouri 1964–77
- Chuck Hunsinger, pro football player
- Bonnie Hunt, actress, director, talk-show host, Beethoven, Jerry Maguire, Cheaper by the Dozen, Return to Me
- Brendan Hunt, co-creator and cast member of Ted Lasso
- H. L. Hunt, oil tycoon
- Jarvis Hunt, architect
- Lester C. Hunt, U.S. senator and governor of Wyoming
- Marsha Hunt, actress, Raw Deal, Panama Hattie, Johnny Got His Gun, Carnegie Hall
- Myron Hunt, architect of Rose Bowl stadium (born in Massachusetts)
- Richard Hunt, sculptor
- Stephen Hunter, novelist, Pulitzer Prize-winning critic (born in Missouri)
- Steven Hunter, center for four NBA teams
- Stephen A. Hurlbut, lawyer, Civil War general, ambassador (born in South Carolina)
- John Huston, pro golfer, top-five in 1990 Masters, 2000 U.S. Open
- Ken Huszagh, swimmer, 1912 Olympic Games gold medalist
- Robert Maynard Hutchins, lawyer, president of University of Chicago (born in New York)
- Ina Ray Hutton, entertainer and bandleader
- June Hutton, singer and actress
- J. B. Hutto, blues musician (born in South Carolina)
- Dick Hyde, MLB pitcher 1955–61
- Henry J. Hyde, politician (Republican), U.S. representative 1975–2007, chaired House Judiciary Committee
- Ida Henrietta Hyde, physiologist and professor (born in Iowa)
- J. Allen Hynek, astronomer, UFO authority

== I ==
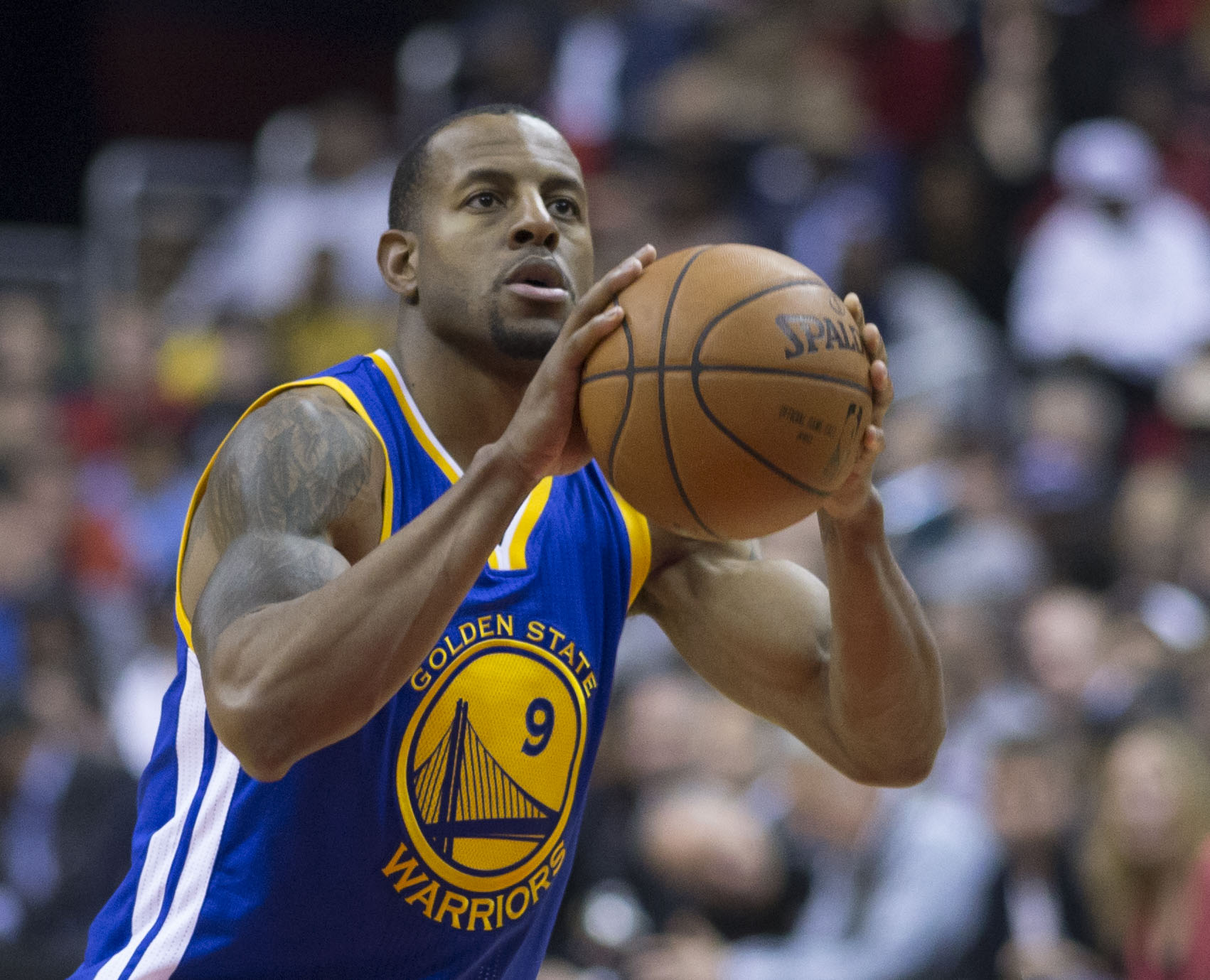
Andre Iguodala

- Harold L. Ickes, U.S. secretary of the interior under FDR and Truman (born in Pennsylvania)
- Harold Iddings, college football, basketball coach
- Andre Iguodala, four-time NBA champion player for Golden State Warriors, 2015 NBA Finals MVP
- James Iha, musician with The Smashing Pumpkins
- Tunch Ilkin, lineman, broadcaster for Pittsburgh Steelers
- Margaret Illington, silent-film actress
- Roger Imhof, actor
- The Impressions, R&B group, Rock and Roll Hall of Fame
- Ebon C. Ingersoll, U.S. representative 1864–70 (born in New York)
- Robert G. Ingersoll, 19th-century Illinois attorney general, reformer (born in New York)
- Lloyd Ingraham, actor and director
- Mark Ingram Sr., NFL wide receiver 1987–96, father of Heisman Trophy winner Mark Ingram II
- Rex Ingram, actor, The Adventures of Huckleberry Finn, Sahara, Cabin in the Sky, Your Cheatin' Heart
- Jeff Innis, pitcher for New York Mets 1987–93
- Samuel Insull, industrialist, builder of Chicago Opera House (born in England)
- George Ireland, coach of Loyola team that won 1963 NCAA basketball championship (born in Wisconsin)
- Jim Irsay, owner of NFL's Indianapolis Colts
- Robert Irsay, owned Baltimore and Indianapolis Colts 1972–97
- Dick Irvin, coach and first captain of Chicago Blackhawks (born in Canada)
- Richard Irvin, mayor of Aurora
- Wilson Irvine, impressionist painter
- Charlie Irwin, MLB infielder 1893–1902
- Ivan Irwin, NHL player, New York Rangers, Montreal Canadiens
- Tom Irwin, actor, Saving Grace, My So-Called Life, Related
- Jason Isringhausen, relief pitcher for six MLB teams
- Dan Issel, Hall of Fame basketball player, University of Kentucky, Denver Nuggets, NBA coach and GM
- Burl Ives, Oscar-winning actor, The Big Country, Cat on a Hot Tin Roof; folk musician ("A Holly Jolly Christmas")
- Judith Ivey, Tony Award-winning actress, Sister, Sister, Brighton Beach Memoirs, The Woman in Red (born in Texas)
- Eugene Izzi, novelist working in hardboiled crime fiction

== J ==
Ja–Jn

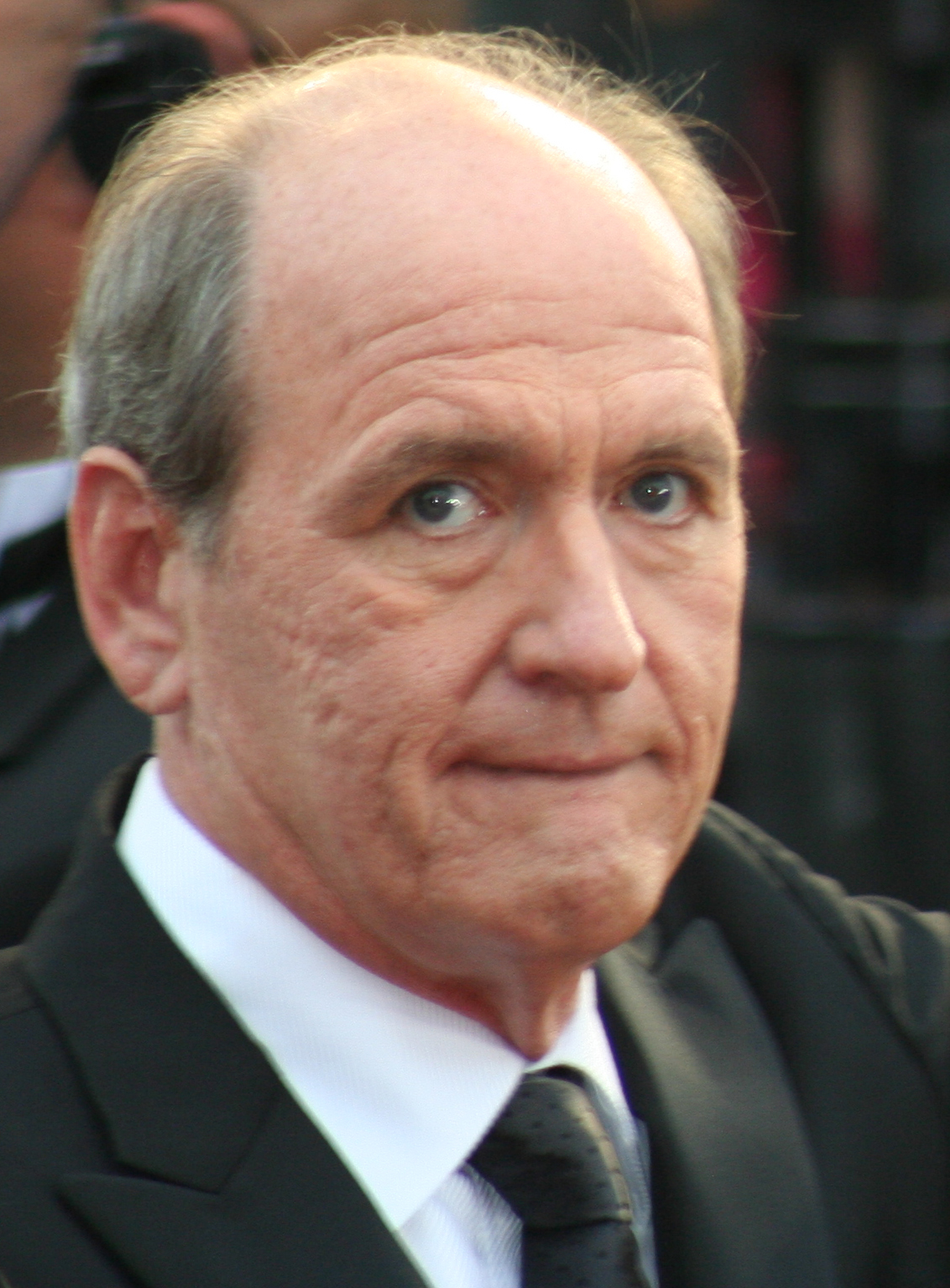
Richard Jenkins

- Ray Jablonski, MLB infielder 1953–59
- Adoree Jackson, USC and NFL wide receiver
- Frisman Jackson, NFL wide receiver 2002–07
- Jesse Jackson, political activist and candidate, Baptist minister, TV commentator (born in South Carolina)
- Jesse Jackson Jr., U.S. representative, tendered resignation 2012
- Jonathan Jackson, U.S. representative
- Leroy Jackson, three-time state 100-yard dash champion, NFL running back
- Mahalia Jackson, gospel singer, Grammy Lifetime Achievement Award (born in Louisiana)
- Mannie Jackson, owner of Harlem Globetrotters
- Mark Jackson, NFL wide receiver 1986–94, played in three Super Bowl games
- Michael Jackson, iconic pop singer (born in Indiana)
- Phil Jackson, Hall of Fame coach of six-time NBA champion Chicago Bulls (born in Montana)
- Shoeless Joe Jackson, outfielder for Black Sox banned from baseball (born in South Carolina)
- Wilfred Jackson, animator, director of Disney's Fantasia, Dumbo, Cinderella, Snow White and the Seven Dwarfs
- Harry Jacobs, pro linebacker 1960–72, two AFL championships
- Jim Jacobs, composer, Grease
- Colombe Jacobsen, chef and actress
- Baby Doll Jacobson, MLB outfielder 1915–27
- Peter Jacobson, actor, House, Transformers, Ray Donovan
- Walter Jacobson, television news journalist
- Scott Jacoby, Emmy-winning actor
- Andrea Jaeger, tennis player, Wimbledon and French Open finalist
- Thomas Jaeschke, volleyball player, 2016 Olympic medalist
- Evan Jager, distance runner, U.S. record holder in 3000m steeplechase
- Tom Jager, swimmer, five-time Olympic champion, 11-time U.S. champion
- Helmut Jahn, architect (born in Germany)
- John Jakes, author, The Kent Family Chronicles, North and South
- Ahmad Jamal, jazz pianist
- Brian James, basketball coach
- Edmund J. James, president of University of Illinois 1904–20
- Joni James, singer, "Why Don't You Believe Me?"
- Louis N. James, golfer, 1902 U.S. Amateur champion
- Peter Francis James, actor, voice-over artist
- William James, NFL defensive back 2001–10
- Joyce Jameson, actress
- Bob Jamieson, television journalist
- Dick Jamieson, football coach 1972–97
- Jim Jamieson, pro golfer (born in Michigan)
- Bob Janecyk, NHL goalie 1983–89
- Bill Janklow, 16-year Governor of South Dakota
- Danny Jansen, MLB catcher
- Natalie Jaresko, minister of finance, Ukraine
- Joseph Jarman, jazz musician and Buddhist priest (born in Arkansas)
- Valerie Jarrett, senior advisor to President Barack Obama
- Pat Jarvis, pitcher for Montreal Expos and Atlanta Braves
- Ray Jauch, football player and coach
- Dick Jauron, NFL defensive back, head coach of Buffalo Bills, Chicago Bears and Detroit Lions
- Dave Jauss, baseball coach and scout
- William Jayne, first governor of Dakota Territory 1861–63
- Betty Jaynes, singer and actress (born in Tennessee)
- Robert Jeangerard, Olympic basketball gold medalist
- Denise Jefferson, director Alvin Ailey American Dance Theater 1984–2010
- Thomas B. Jeffery, 19th-century auto and bicycle pioneer (born in England)
- Mae Jemison, physician and astronaut (born in Alabama)
- Joe Jemsek, golfer and owner of Cog Hill course
- Edward H. Jenison, publisher, naval commander, U.S. representative (born in Wisconsin)
- Ella Jenkins, educator, Grammy-winning singer
- Ferguson Jenkins, Hall of Fame pitcher for Chicago Cubs (born in Canada)
- LaTasha Jenkins, sprinter
- Leroy Jenkins, violinist
- Richard Jenkins, Oscar-nominated, Emmy-winning actor, The Visitor, Six Feet Under, Step Brothers, Olive Kitteridge
- James M. Jenness, CEO of Kellogg's 2004–06
- William Le Baron Jenney, architect, originator of metal-frame skyscraper (born in Massachusetts)
- William Sherman Jennings, 18th governor of Florida
- Derrick Jensen, tight end for Oakland Raiders 1979–86
- Jens Jensen, landscape architect (born in Denmark)
- Jeremih, R&B singer
- Garry Jestadt, MLB infielder 1969–72
- Rob Jeter, basketball coach, Milwaukee, Western Illinois (born in Pennsylvania)
- Sam Jethroe, outfielder, 1950 National League Rookie of the Year
- Martin C. Jischke, president of Iowa State and Purdue

Jo–Jz

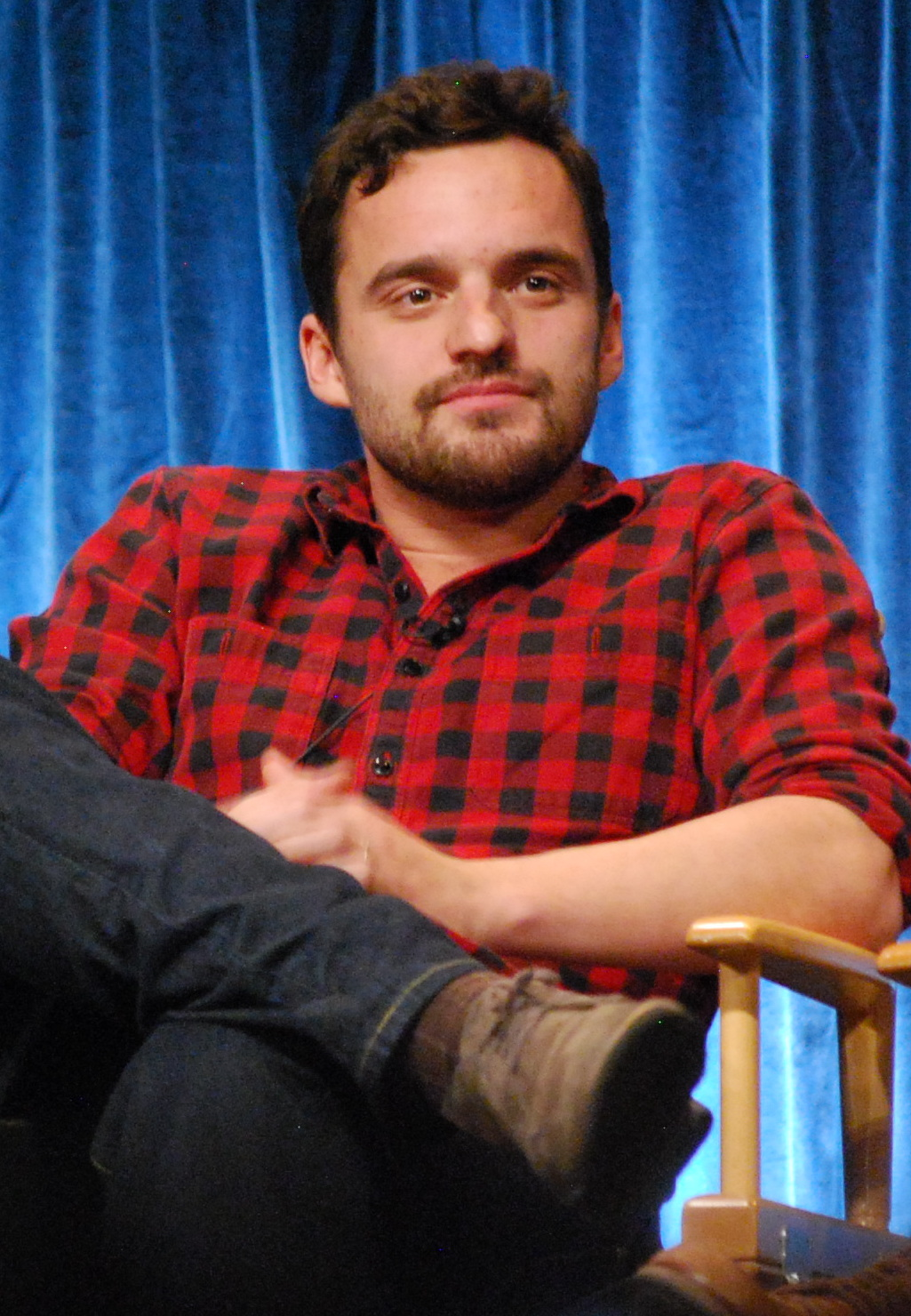
Jake Johnson

- Anton J. Johnson, dairy executive, mayor of Macomb, U.S. representative
- Armon Johnson, point guard for Portland Trail Blazers 2010–12
- Arnold Johnson, owner of MLB's Philadelphia and Kansas City Athletics
- Arte Johnson, actor, Rowan & Martin's Laugh-In
- Bob Johnson, pitcher for five Major League teams
- Bobby Johnson, wide receiver for New York Giants 1984–86
- Brandon Johnson, 57th mayor of Chicago
- Carrie Ashton Johnson, newspaper editor, writer, suffragist
- Charles R. Johnson, scholar, novelist, author of Middle Passage
- Chic Johnson, comedian, Olsen and Johnson
- Curley Johnson, player for Harlem Globetrotters
- Diane Johnson, author and screenwriter, Le Divorce, The Shining
- Don Johnson, MLB player, last Cub to bat in World Series before 2016
- Eddie Johnson, player for six NBA teams
- Ernie Johnson, MLB shortstop 1912–25
- George E. Johnson Sr., cosmetics executive (born in Mississippi)
- Howard Wesley Johnson, president of MIT, chairman of board of trustees
- Jake Johnson, actor, New Girl, Let's Be Cops, The Mummy
- Jan Johnson, three-time NCAA pole vault champion, 1972 Olympic medalist
- Jim Johnson, defensive coordinator for Notre Dame, NFL teams
- John H. Johnson, publisher of Ebony, Jet (born in Arkansas)
- Lynn-Holly Johnson, professional ice skater and actress, Ice Castles, For Your Eyes Only
- Mickey Johnson, NBA forward 1974–86
- Nancy Johnson, U.S. representative for Connecticut 1983–2007
- Phillip E. Johnson, professor, father of intelligent design movement
- Raylee Johnson, NFL defensive end 1993–2003
- Richard Johnson, defensive back for Houston Oilers
- Robert L. Johnson, founder of Black Entertainment Television, owned Charlotte Bobcats (born in Mississippi)
- Sheila Johnson, philanthropist, owner of Washington Mystics (born in Pennsylvania)
- Syleena Johnson, singer and TV personality
- Timothy V. Johnson, politician (Republican), U.S. representative 2001–13
- Luke Johnsos, player and coach for Chicago Bears
- Bruce Johnston, singer for Beach Boys, composer of "I Write the Songs"
- J. J. Johnston, actor, boxing historian
- Louis Jolliet, explorer, early Illinois territory settler (born in Canada)
- Adam Jones, Grammy-winning guitarist
- Amanda Jones, 1973 Miss USA, first runner-up Miss Universe
- Austin Jones, former YouTuber, musician, and a capella artist
- Barbara Jones, sprinter, 1952 and 1960 Olympic relay golds
- Darryl Jones, guitarist for The Rolling Stones
- David Jones, physician, second owner of NFL's Chicago Cardinals
- Earl Jones, athlete, 800 meters bronze in 1984 Summer Olympics
- Esther Jones, sprinter, 1992 Summer Olympics relay gold
- Garrett Jones, MLB first baseman and outfielder 2007–15
- Hoppy Jones, original member of singing group The Ink Spots
- James Jones, author, From Here to Eternity, Some Came Running, The Thin Red Line
- Jo Jones, drummer for Count Basie
- Mary Harris Jones, labor organizer (born in Ireland)
- Melvin Jones, founder of Lions Club International (born in Arizona)
- Ralph Jones, coach of Chicago Bears, basketball coach at Purdue, Illinois and Butler (born in Indiana)
- Quincy Jones, musician, conductor, producer, arranger, composer, film composer, Grammy Legend Award
- Rickie Lee Jones, Grammy-winning singer and songwriter
- Sam J. Jones, actor, Flash Gordon, 10, Ted
- Wesley Livsey Jones, U.S. senator of Washington 1909–32
- Bob Jordan, television journalist (born in Georgia)
- Clifford Jordan, jazz musician
- Jim Jordan, actor, radio's Fibber McGee and Molly
- John Jordan, basketball coach for Loyola and Notre Dame
- Marian Driscoll Jordan, actress, Fibber McGee and Molly
- Michael Jordan, basketball player, NCAA champion, two-time Olympic champion, six-time NBA champion for Chicago Bulls, owner of Charlotte Hornets (born in North Carolina)
- Reggie Jordan, NBA guard 1994–2000
- Arndt Jorgens, MLB catcher 1929–39 (born in Norway)
- Orville Jorgens, MLB pitcher 1935–37
- Ron and Vivian Joseph, Olympic pairs skaters
- Al Joyner, athlete, gold medalist in triple jump at 1984 Summer Olympics
- Jackie Joyner-Kersee, athlete, UCLA basketball and track, four-time Olympian, three golds, six medals
- Tom Joyner, radio personality
- Norman B. Judd, U.S. representative 1867–71 (born in New York)
- Howie Judson, pitcher for Chicago White Sox, Cincinnati Reds
- Sylvia Shaw Judson, sculptor
- Whitcomb L. Judson, inventor of the zipper
- Jakob Junis, MLB pitcher
- John Jurkovic, football player, radio personality
- Herb Juul, MLB pitcher, Illinois basketball player, coach
- Warren C. Jyrch, first hemophiliac ever to have open heart surgery

== K ==
Ka–Kg

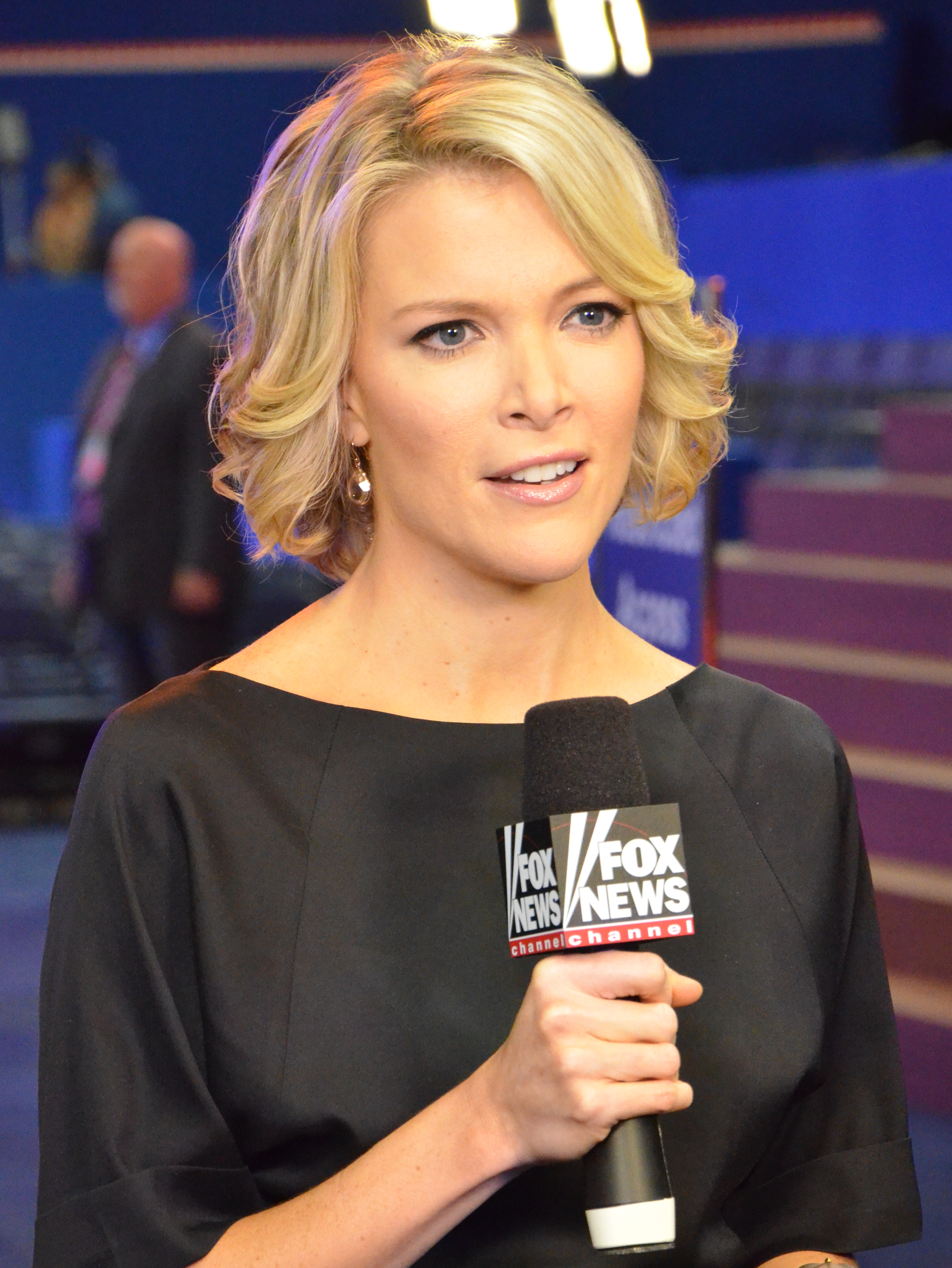
Megyn Kelly

- Ted Kaczynski, notorious Unabomber criminal
- Mike Kafka, NFL and Northwestern quarterback
- Gus Kahn, songwriter, "I'll See You in My Dreams" (born in Germany)
- James Kahn, writer of Star Wars novels, television producer
- Harry Kalas, Hall of Fame sportscaster for Philadelphia Phillies
- Floyd Kalber, longtime Chicago television journalist (born in Nebraska)
- Frank Kaminsky, NBA center, 2015 Big Ten Player of the Year
- Stuart M. Kaminsky, mystery novelist
- Elias Kane, judge, first Illinois secretary of state, U.S. senator 1825–35 (born in New York)
- Marjorie Kane, actress, The Dentist, The Loud Mouth
- Patrick Kane, three-time Stanley Cup champion with Chicago Blackhawks (born in New York)
- Maria Kanellis, WWE professional wrestler
- Kraig Kann, Golf Channel personality, LPGA official
- Anna Kaplan (born 1985), New York State senator
- Henry Kaplan, pioneer in radiation therapy and radiobiology
- Irving Kaplansky, mathematician at University of Chicago (born in Canada)
- Jack Kapp, founder of Decca Records
- Chris Kappler, Olympic equestrian gold medalist
- Frederick J. Karch, World War II and Vietnam general
- Fred Karger, political consultant
- Fred Karlin, songwriter, "For All We Know"
- Phil Karlson, film director, Kid Galahad, Kansas City Confidential, The Silencers, Walking Tall
- Lloyd A. Karmeier, judge, Illinois Supreme Court 2000–20
- Roberta Karmel, Centennial Professor at Brooklyn Law School, first female Commissioner of U.S. Securities and Exchange Commission
- Johnny Karras, halfback for Illinois 1952 Rose Bowl champions
- Ted Karras, NFL center, two-time Super Bowl champion with New England Patriots
- Kevin Kasper, wide receiver for eight NFL teams
- Leon Kass, physician, scientist, educator, public intellectual
- Chuck Kassel, NFL player 1927–33
- Terry Kath, musician with band Chicago
- Stana Katic, actress, Castle, Absentia (born in Canada)
- Philip Kaufman, film director, The Right Stuff, The Unbearable Lightness of Being, Rising Sun
- Tony Kaufmann, MLB pitcher 1921–35
- Herminie Templeton Kavanagh, writer, Darby O'Gill and the Little People (born in England)
- Yosh Kawano, 65-year employee of Chicago Cubs (born in Washington)
- Kenneth Kays, decorated soldier
- Marilyn Kaytor, food writer
- Steven Kazmierczak, perpetrator of the 2008 Northern Illinois University shooting
- Tim Kazurinsky, actor, comedian, Saturday Night Live, Police Academy
- Bill Keating, lineman, 1965 Rose Bowl champion Michigan
- Tom Keating, NFL defensive tackle 1964–75
- Julie Kedzie, mixed martial artist
- Howard Keel, actor, singer, Seven Brides for Seven Brothers, Kiss Me Kate, Kismet, Calamity Jane, Dallas
- James Keeley, newspaper publisher (born in England)
- John L. Keeley Jr., investment manager and philanthropist
- Leslie Keeley, physician, founder of Keeley Institute for addiction treatment
- Cody Keenan, speechwriter for President Barack Obama
- Rosalind Keith, actress, Criminals of the Air, Trouble in Sundown
- Clayton Keller, NHL player (born in Missouri)
- Kent E. Keller, U.S. representative 1931–41
- Sheldon Keller, comedy writer
- Barry Kelley, actor, The Asphalt Jungle, Buchanan Rides Alone
- Florence Kelley, social reformer, founder of National Consumers' League (born in Pennsylvania)
- Mike Kelley, creator of TV series Revenge
- Hiram Huntington Kellogg Sr., minister, first Knox College president (born in New York)
- Carson Kelly, MLB catcher
- Dennis Kelly, NFL offensive tackle
- Edward Joseph Kelly, 14-year mayor of Chicago
- Harry Kelly, decorated World War I soldier, governor of Michigan
- James Kelly, founder of Chicago Tribune
- Megyn Kelly, journalist for Fox News and NBC News, host of Megyn Kelly Today
- R. Kelly, singer and songwriter
- Robin Kelly, politician (Democrat), U.S. representative (born in New York)
- Tim Kelly, NFL offensive coordinator
- Caren Kemner, volleyball player, bronze medal in 1992 Summer Olympics
- Mike Kenn, tackle for Atlanta Falcons, starter in 251 NFL games
- Michael Kenna, saloonkeeper, Chicago alderman
- Bob Kennedy, MLB player 1939–57, manager of Chicago Cubs and Oakland A's
- Christopher G. Kennedy, president of Merchandise Mart, university trustee, nephew of John F. Kennedy (born in Massachusetts)
- D. James Kennedy, pastor, Christian broadcaster
- Ethel Kennedy, widow of U.S. senator and attorney general Robert F. Kennedy, awarded Presidential Medal of Freedom
- John Kennedy, MLB infielder 1962–74
- Madge Kennedy, actress, The Marrying Kind, Lust for Life
- Merna Kennedy, actress, wife of Busby Berkeley
- Martin H. Kennelly, mayor of Chicago 1948–55
- Ernie Kent, basketball head coach for Washington State and Oregon
- Mel Kenyon, auto racer, five top-5 finishes in Indy 500
- Robert Keohane, co-founder of neoliberalism school of thought
- Hugh Keough, horse racing official and sportswriter
- Joe E. Kernan, decorated Vietnam War aviator, mayor of South Bend 1988–97, governor of Indiana 2003–05
- Otto Kerner Jr., politician (Democrat), decorated World War II soldier, governor of Illinois 1961–68, imprisoned 1974
- Otto Kerner Sr., judge, attorney general of Illinois
- Johnny Kerr, NBA player, coach, broadcaster for Chicago Bulls, member of Hall of Fame
- Walter Kerr, Broadway drama critic
- Jack Kerris, Loyola and pro basketball player
- Donald Kerst, physicist, worked on Manhattan Project
- Brian Kerwin, actor, Murphy's Romance, Love Field, Torch Song Trilogy, 27 Dresses, Beggars and Choosers
- Joseph Kerwin, astronaut and physician
- T'Keyah Crystal Keymáh, actress, That's So Raven, Cosby, In Living Color
- Madison Keys, tennis player, 2017 U.S. Open runner-up

Kh–Kn

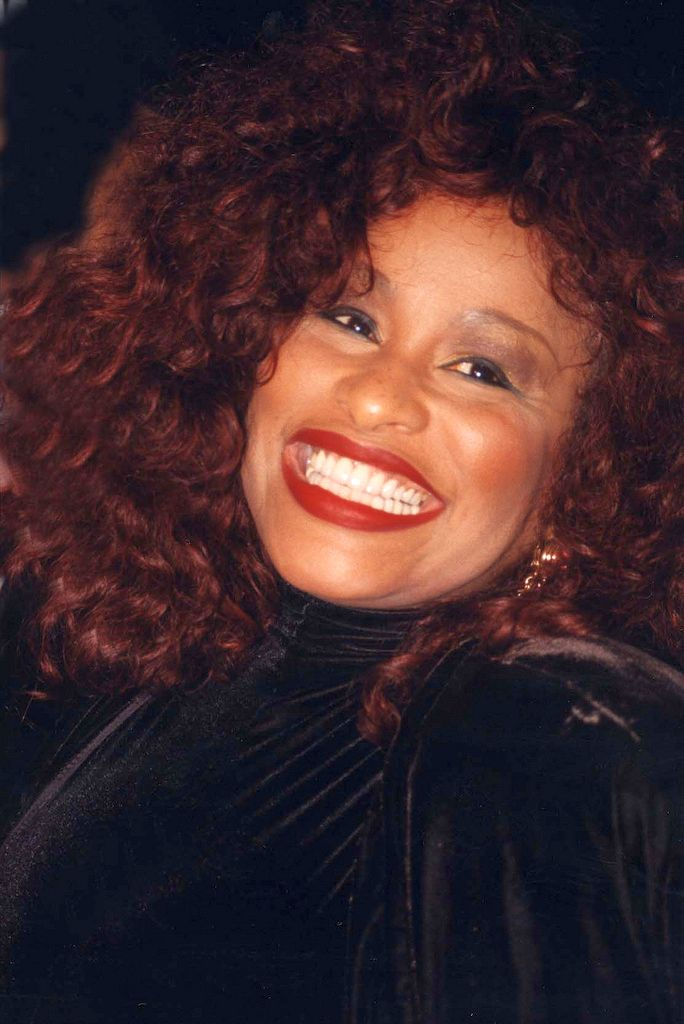
Chaka Khan

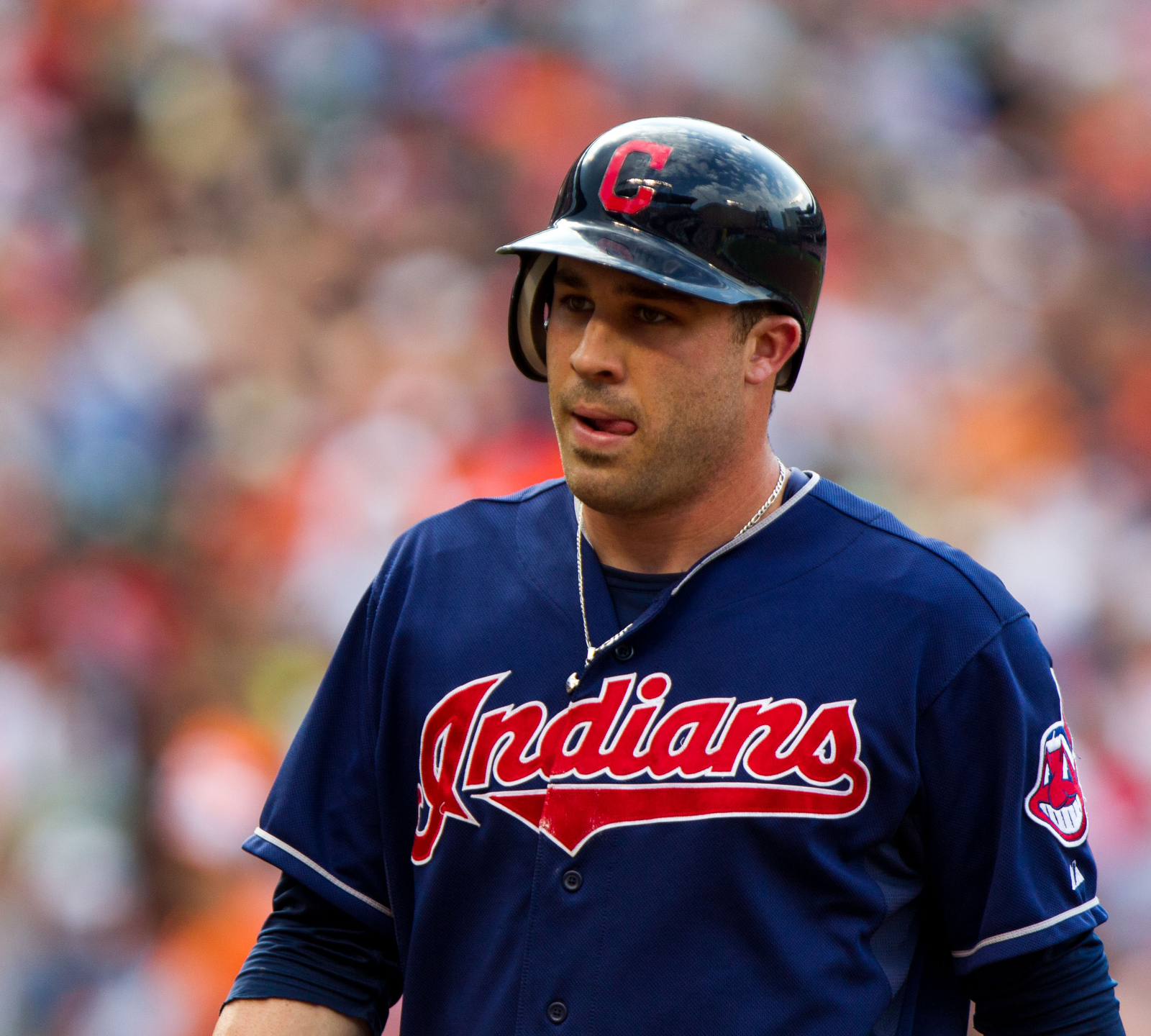
Jason Kipnis

- Chaka Khan, singer, multiple Grammy Award winner
- Fazlur Khan, designer of John Hancock Center, Willis Tower (born in India)
- Shahid Khan, owner, Jacksonville Jaguars (born in Pakistan)
- Tony Khan, football and wrestling executive
- Gerald Frederick Kicanas, archbishop of Tucson, Arizona
- John Kidd, NFL punter 1984–98
- Adolph Kiefer, swimmer, backstroke gold medalist in 1936 Olympics
- Thomas L. Kilbride, judge, Supreme Court of Illinois 2000–20
- Richard Kiley, Emmy and Tony Award-winning actor, Blackboard Jungle, A Year in the Life, Man of La Mancha, The Phenix City Story
- Dorothy Kilgallen, columnist, game show panelist
- Philip G. Killey, director of Air National Guard
- James M. Kilts, CEO of Gillette
- William Wallace Kimball, piano manufacturer (born in Maine)
- Elbert Kimbrough, defensive back for San Francisco 49ers 1962–66
- Kyle Kinane, stand-up comedian
- Dave Kindred, sports journalist
- Bill King, radio voice of Oakland A's, Raiders, Golden State Warriors
- Bradley King, early Hollywood screenwriter
- Edward John King, seven-term U.S. representative (born in Massachusetts)
- Frank King, cartoonist, creator of Gasoline Alley (born in Wisconsin)
- Freddie King, musician in Blues Hall of Fame (born in Texas)
- Ginevra King, socialite
- Mary-Claire King, geneticist
- Ray King, MLB pitcher 1999–2008
- Wayne King, bandleader
- Dave Kingman, 15-year MLB outfielder (born in Oregon)
- Sam Kinison, stand-up comedian, actor (born in Washington)
- Terry Kinney, actor, Oz, The Unusuals, Sleepers, The Firm, co-founder of Steppenwolf Theatre Company
- William Kinney, lieutenant governor 1826–30 (born in Kentucky)
- John Kinsella, swimmer, gold medalist at 1972 Summer Olympics
- Juliet Magill Kinzie, historian (born in Connecticut)
- John Kinzie, early Chicago settler (born in Ireland)
- John H. Kinzie, trader, Chicago politician (born in Canada)
- Adam Kinzinger, Air Force pilot, politician (Republican), U.S. representative 2011–23
- Jason Kipnis, MLB second baseman 2011–20
- Bob Kipper, MLB pitcher 1985–92
- George Kirby, comedian
- Rollin Kirby, cartoonist
- Mark Kirk, politician (Republican), U.S. representative 2001–10 and U.S. senator 2010–17
- Jeane Kirkpatrick, U.S. ambassador to United Nations 1981–85 (born in Oklahoma)
- Jess Kirkpatrick, actor and announcer
- Jimmy Kite, auto racer
- Kurt Kittner, quarterback for Illinois, champion and MVP of World Bowl XIII
- Tom Kivisto, basketball player, businessman
- Nick Kladis, basketball player, businessman, part-owner of Chicago White Sox, St. Louis Cardinals
- Billy Klaus, MLB player 1952–63
- Bobby Klaus, MLB player 1964–65
- Gary Kleck, criminologist, Florida State University professor emeritus
- Chris Klein, actor, American Pie film series, Rollerball
- Dick Klein, first owner, general manager of Chicago Bulls (born in Iowa)
- Dick Klein, tackle for Chicago Bears, Dallas Cowboys
- Tom Kleinschmidt, basketball player for DePaul, coach of DePaul College Prep
- Josh Kline, NFL offensive guard 2013–19
- William G. Kline, basketball and baseball coach, Nebraska and Florida
- Frank Klopas, soccer player, coach of Chicago Fire
- Karlie Kloss, fashion model
- John C. Kluczynski, politician (Democrat), U.S. representative 1951–75
- Ted Kluszewski, first baseman for Cincinnati Reds, Chicago White Sox, three home runs in 1959 World Series
- Philip Klutznick, U.S. secretary of commerce 1980–81, Chicago Bulls president 1973 (born in Missouri)
- Cole Kmet, NFL tight end
- Anthony L. Knapp, U.S. representative 1861–65 (born in New York)
- Lindsay Knapp, guard for Notre Dame and Super Bowl XXXI champion Green Bay Packers
- Robert M. Knapp, U.S. representative 1873–79 (born in New York)
- Willie Knapp, jockey in Hall of Fame, winner of 1918 Kentucky Derby
- Chad Knaus, NASCAR crew chief
- Alexa Scimeca Knierim, figure skater, 2022 world champion and 2022 Winter Olympics gold medalist
- Joe Knollenberg, U.S. representative of Michigan 1993–2009
- Oscar Knop, NFL halfback 1920–27
- Frank Knox, newspaper publisher/owner and secretary of the Navy (born in Massachusetts)

Ko–Kz

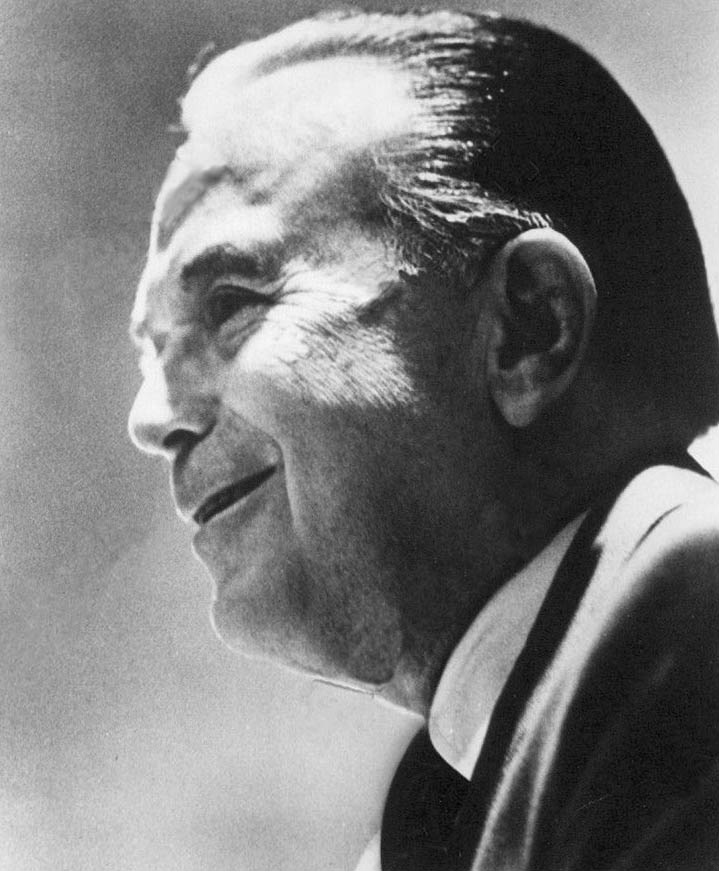
Ray Kroc

- Tom Koch, writer for Mad magazine
- Leo Kocialkowski, tax appraiser, U.S. representative 1933–43
- Dave Kocourek, tight end in seven AFL title games
- Dave Koechner, actor, Second City, Anchorman (born in Missouri)
- Walter Koenig, actor, Star Trek
- Gustav Koerner, lieutenant governor, Abe Lincoln aide (born in Germany)
- Bob Koester, founder of Delmark Records (born in Kansas)
- Seana Kofoed, actress, Men in Trees
- Herman Kogan, journalist
- Rick Kogan, journalist
- Herbert Kohler Jr., billionaire businessman, CEO of Kohler Co.
- Ruth DeYoung Kohler, journalist
- H. H. Kohlsaat, newspaper publisher
- Dick Kokos, MLB outfielder 1948–54
- Dan Kolb, MLB pitcher 1999–2007
- Gary Kolb, MLB outfielder 1960–69
- Darlene Koldenhoven, Grammy Award-winning singer
- Henry Kolker, actor, Holiday, Union Pacific
- Fred Koller, songwriter
- Don Kolloway, MLB infielder 1940–53
- Bonnie Koloc, folk singer (born in Iowa)
- Lou Kolls, football player, MLB umpire
- Mort Kondracke, political commentator, columnist for Roll Call
- Paul Konerko, 15-year first baseman for White Sox (born in Rhode Island)
- Lee Konitz, saxophonist
- George Kontos, relief pitcher for 2012 World Series champion San Francisco Giants
- David Kopay, pro football running back, author, gay rights activist
- Harvey Korman, actor and comedian, The Carol Burnett Show, Blazing Saddles, History of the World, Part I, High Anxiety
- Sidney Korshak, labor lawyer
- Eddie Kotal, pro football player
- Glenn Kotche, drummer
- Arlene Kotil, pro baseball player
- Irene Kotowicz, pro baseball player
- George Kotsiopoulos, TV personality, Fashion Police
- Rich Koz, television personality Svengoolie
- Joe Krabbenhoft, basketball player, coach for Wisconsin
- Joe Krakoski, NFL defensive back 1961–66
- Irene Kral, singer
- Roy Kral, jazz musician
- Akiane Kramarik, poet and painter
- Olof Krans, Civil War soldier in Illinois regiment, Swedish-American painter and artist
- Nelson G. Kraschel, Governor of Iowa 1937–39
- Jerry Krause, general manager of six-time NBA champion Chicago Bulls
- Moose Krause, four-sport athlete, coach, athletic director for Notre Dame
- Alison Krauss, multiple Grammy Award-winning bluegrass musician and composer
- Mike Kreevich, MLB outfielder 1931–45
- Albert Henry Krehbiel, painter, Art Institute of Chicago professor (born in Iowa)
- Frederick Kreismann, mayor of St. Louis 1909–13
- Rich Kreitling, NFL wide receiver 1959–64
- Gary Kremen, founder of Match.com
- Raja Krishnamoorthi, lawyer, U.S. representative (born in India)
- John Kriza, ballet dancer
- Ray Kroc, CEO of McDonald's, owned San Diego Padres
- Egil Krogh, lawyer, aide to President Richard Nixon, Watergate figure
- Ian Krol, MLB pitcher 2013–21
- Candace Kroslak, actress, Ocean Ave.
- Casey Krueger, pro soccer player, Chicago Red Stars
- Bill Krueger, pitcher for eight MLB teams
- Ernie Krueger, MLB catcher 1913–25
- Gene Krupa, drummer, subject of film The Gene Krupa Story
- Todd Krygier, hockey player for Washington Capitals and Anaheim Ducks
- Mike Krzyzewski, basketball coach for Duke University, five NCAA championships, 2008 and 2012 Olympic gold medals, Hall of Fame
- Steve Kuberski, forward for Boston Celtics and Milwaukee Bucks
- Daniel Kucera, Catholic bishop, Illinois Benedictine president
- Jonathan Kuck, speed skater, 2010 Winter Olympics silver medalist
- John Kuenster, editor of Baseball Digest, author
- Mickey Kuhn, actor
- Toni Kukoc, Hall of Fame player and executive for Chicago Bulls (born in Croatia)
- Jake Kumerow, NFL wide receiver
- George Kunz, NFL lineman for Atlanta Falcons, Baltimore Colts
- Stanley H. Kunz, thoroughbred breeder, U.S. representative 1921–33 (born in Pennsylvania)
- Irv Kupcinet, newspaper columnist, broadcaster
- Karyn Kupcinet, actress, murder victim
- C.J. Kupec, center for Michigan and Los Angeles Lakers
- Bill Kurtis, television news journalist (born in Florida)
- Emil Kush, pitcher for Chicago Cubs 1941–49
- Sarah Kustok, sportscaster
- Zak Kustok, quarterback for Northwestern
- Bob Kustra, president of Boise State 2003–18, Lieutenant Governor of Illinois 1991–98 (born in Missouri)
- Michael Kutza, founder of Chicago International Film Festival
- Ken Kwapis, TV and film director, The Office, The Sisterhood of the Traveling Pants, He's Just Not That Into You

== L ==
La–Ld

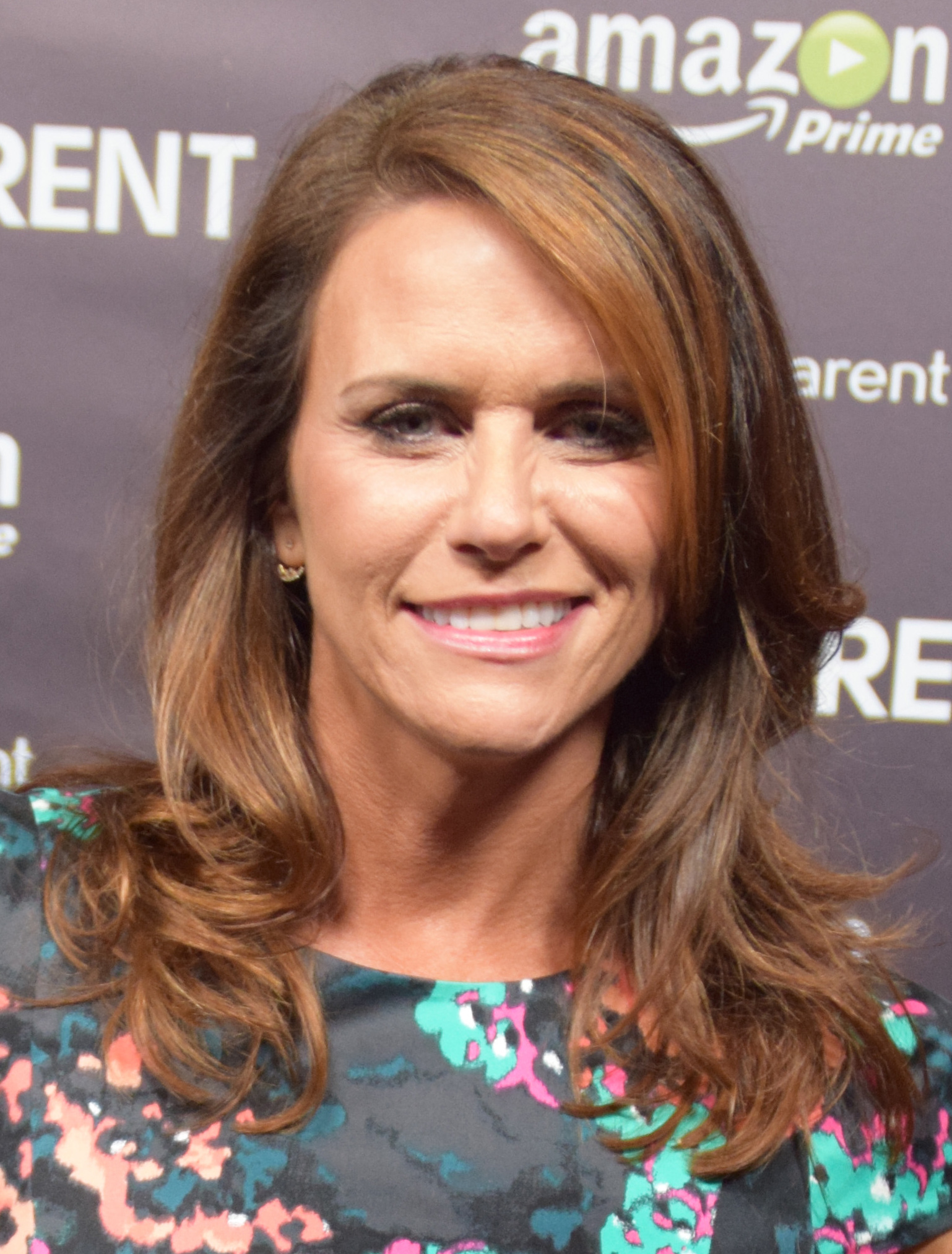
Amy Landecker

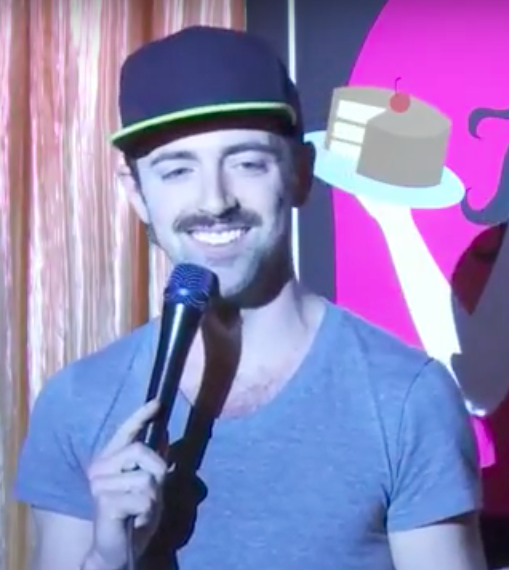
Matteo Lane

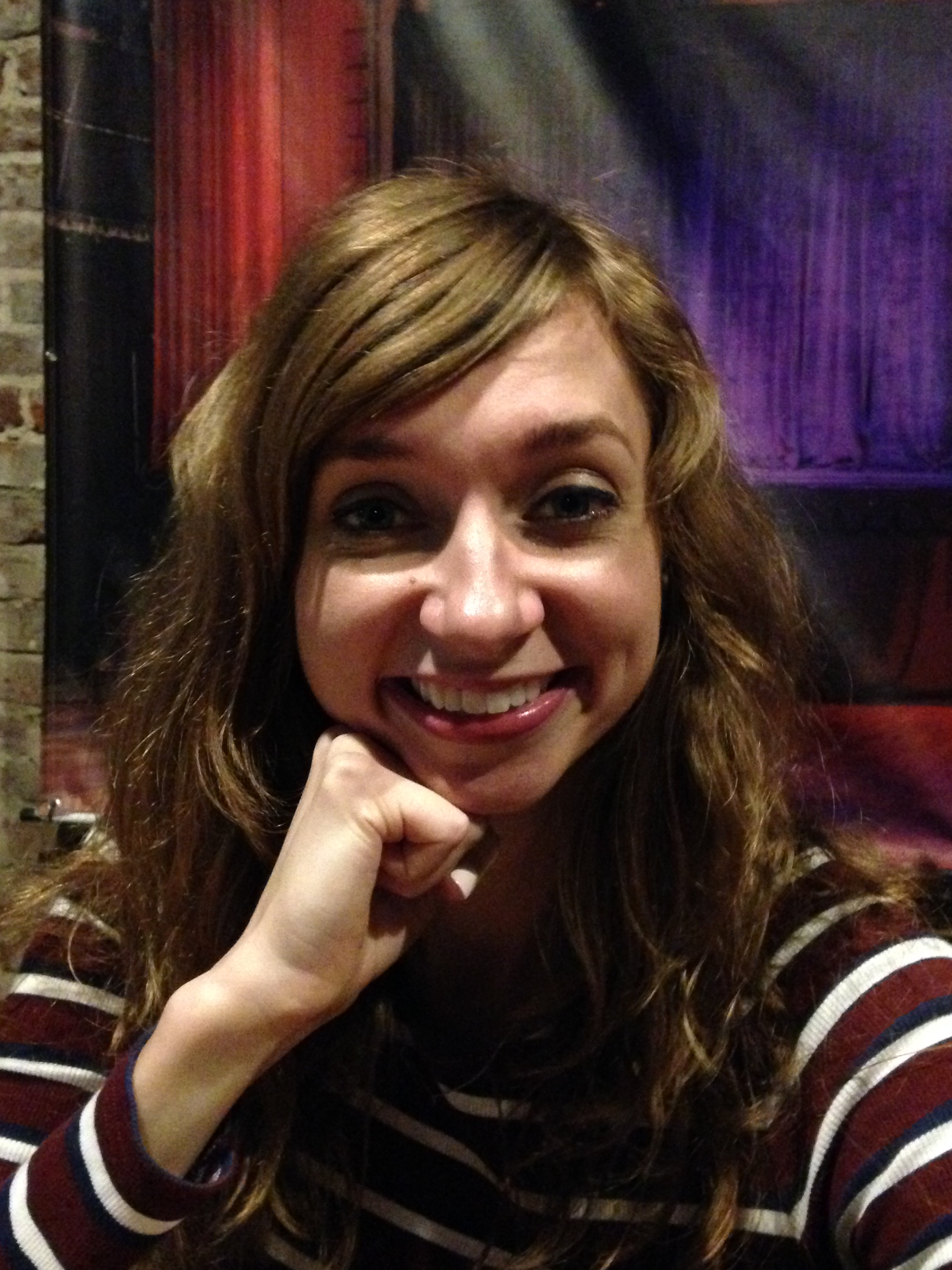
Lauren Lapkus

- Walter B. LaBerge, under secretary of Army, Air Force, NATO
- Ben LaBolt, political advisor, White House communications director
- Harry Lachman, film director, Dante's Inferno, Our Relations
- Bob Lackey, basketball player for Marquette and ABA's New York Nets
- Ethel Lackie, swimmer, two gold medals in 1924 Summer Olympics
- Matt LaCosse, NFL tight end 2015–21
- Tanner Laczynski, NHL center
- Tyler Ladendorf, MLB second baseman 2015–21
- Carl Laemmle, motion picture mogul (born in Germany)
- Carl Laemmle Jr., head of Universal Pictures
- Carla Laemmle, silent-film actress
- A.G. Lafley, CEO of Procter & Gamble (born in New Hampshire)
- Jewel Lafontant, attorney, figure in George H. W. Bush administration
- Garth Lagerwey, goalkeeper, executive in Major League Soccer
- Kyung Lah, Tokyo-based international correspondent for CNN (born in South Korea)
- Ray LaHood, politician (Republican), state and U.S. representative, U.S. secretary of transportation 2009–13
- Bill Laimbeer, NBA center 1979–93, two-time champion with Detroit Pistons, three-time WNBA champion coach (born in Massachusetts)
- Frankie Laine, singer and actor, known for themes to 3:10 to Yuma, Gunfight at the O.K. Corral, Rawhide, Blazing Saddles
- Jean La Lime, early Chicago settler (born in Canada)
- Ricardo Lamas, mixed martial-arts fighter
- Derek Lamely, golfer
- Robert Lamm, musician, songwriter for band Chicago
- Gene Lamont, MLB catcher, coach and manager
- Robert P. Lamont, U.S. secretary of commerce 1927–32 (born in Michigan)
- Amy Landecker, actress, A Serious Man, Louie, Transparent
- Ann Landers (Ruth Crowley, Eppie Lederer), advice columnist
- James Landis, power engineer
- Jessie Royce Landis, actress, North by Northwest, To Catch a Thief
- John Landis, film director, Animal House, The Blues Brothers, Trading Places, Michael Jackson's Thriller
- Kenesaw Mountain Landis, judge, baseball commissioner, banned eight Black Sox (born in Ohio)
- Reed G. Landis, combat pilot, son of Judge Landis
- Margaret Landon, author, Anna and the King of Siam (born in Wisconsin)
- Truman H. Landon, Air Force general (born in Missouri)
- Hobie Landrith, catcher for seven MLB teams
- Mabel Landry, four-time U.S. champion in long jump
- Eric Lane, actor
- Matteo Lane, comedian
- Nora Lane, actress, The Man Hunter, The Cisco Kid
- Tami Lane, Oscar-winning makeup artist
- Will Lang Jr., war correspondent, bureau chief for Life magazine
- Jim Langfelder, mayor of Springfield 2015–23
- Mary Lewis Langworthy, president, Chicago Woman's Club
- Harris Laning, admiral
- John Lankston, opera singer
- Sherry Lansing, actress and CEO of Paramount Pictures
- Lauren Lapkus, actress, Orange Is the New Black, Are You There, Chelsea?, Clipped, Jurassic World
- Alison La Placa, actress, Duet, Open House, Madhouse
- Angelo J. LaPietra, mobster with Chicago Outfit
- John Lardner, war correspondent, New York sportswriter
- Ring Lardner, early 20th-century sportswriter, author, composer, lyricist (born in Michigan)
- Ring Lardner Jr., Oscar-winning screenwriter, Woman of the Year, The Cincinnati Kid, M*A*S*H
- Gene La Rocque, U.S. Navy rear admiral
- Rod La Rocque, actor, The Locked Door, Forbidden Paradise
- Norm Larsen, industrial chemist, inventor of WD-40
- René-Robert Cavelier, Sieur de La Salle, explorer (born in France)
- Kirke La Shelle, reporter, editor, playwright, producer
- Albert Lasker, advertising executive, co-owned Chicago Cubs 1916–25 (born in Germany)
- Jonathan Latimer, author and screenwriter
- Johnny Lattner, football player, Heisman Trophy winner for Notre Dame
- William Lava, composer of animated film music, Looney Tunes
- Arnold Laven, director and producer, The Rifleman, The Big Valley, Rough Night in Jericho, Sam Whiskey
- Hazel Lavery, artist and model
- Jackie LaVine, swimmer, 1952 Olympic bronze medalist
- Ralph Lawler, radio-TV broadcaster of Los Angeles Clippers
- Carol Lawrence, singer and actress
- George R. Lawrence, photographer and aviator
- Robert Henry Lawrence Jr., jet pilot and astronaut
- Victor F. Lawson, publisher of Chicago Daily News 1876–1925
- Don Laz, pole vaulter, silver medalist in 1952 Summer Olympics

Le–Lh

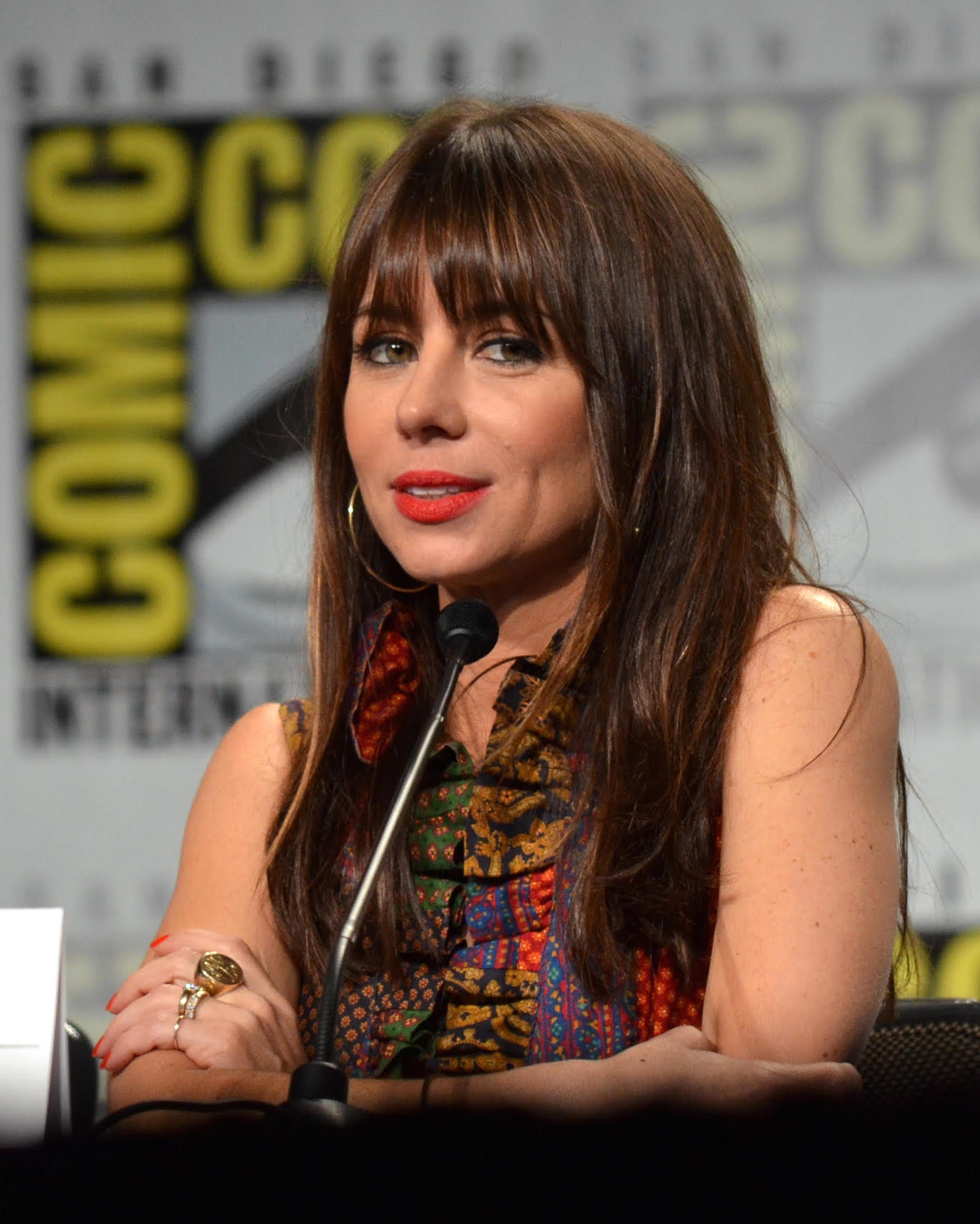
Natasha Leggero

- Cloris Leachman, Oscar-winning, eight-time Emmy-winning actress, The Last Picture Show, Mary Tyler Moore, Young Frankenstein, 1946 Miss Illinois (born in Iowa)
- Brett Lebda, NHL defenseman 2005–11
- Mike Lebovitz, stand-up comedian
- Pepi Lederer, silent-film actress
- Ang Lee, Oscar-winning director, Illinois alumnus (born in Taiwan)
- Doug Lee, NBA player 1991–95
- Mary Lee, actress, Cowboy and the Senorita, South of the Border
- Mike Lee, boxer
- Russell Lee, photographer
- Dan LeFevour, pro football quarterback
- Joan Lefkow, judge (born in Kansas)
- Lance LeGault, actor, The A-Team
- Ernest de Koven Leffingwell, explorer
- Natasha Leggero, comedian, judge on Last Comic Standing
- Charlie Leibrandt, MLB pitcher 1979–93, 1985 World Series champion
- Lefty Leifield, MLB pitcher 1905–20
- Levi Leiter, co-founder of Marshall Field & Co., president of Art Institute of Chicago
- Mark Leiter, pitcher for eight MLB teams
- Charles LeMaire, Oscar-winning costume designer
- John D. LeMay, actor, Friday the 13th: The Series (born in Minnesota)
- Walt Lemon Jr., American player in Israel Basketball Premier League
- Don Lenhardt, player for four MLB teams
- Harry Lennix, actor, Dollhouse, The Blacklist, Matrix films
- Thomas Lennon, actor, comedian, Reno 911!, The State, Viva Variety
- Lance Lenoir, pro football player
- Rick Lenz, actor, Hec Ramsey, Cactus Flower, The Shootist
- Dutch Leonard, pitcher for four MLB teams
- Jack E. Leonard, comedian
- Meyers Leonard, NBA and Illinois center (born in Virginia)
- Robert Z. Leonard, Oscar-nominated film director, The Great Ziegfeld, Pride and Prejudice, The Bribe
- Leopold and Loeb, notorious murderers of 1924
- Lawrence Leritz, dancer, actor
- Leo Lerner, newspaper publisher
- Jim Les, guard for four NBA teams, head coach of UC Davis
- Mikel Leshoure, running back for Detroit Lions 2011–14
- Amy Leslie, opera singer, journalist (born in Iowa)
- Donald Leslie, inventor of Leslie speaker
- Buddy Lester, comedian and actor, Ocean's 11, The Nutty Professor
- Jerry Lester, comedian, television personality
- Ronnie Lester, guard for Chicago Bulls and 1985 NBA champion Los Angeles Lakers (born in Mississippi)
- Tim Lester, quarterback and head coach, Western Michigan
- Tracy Letts, Tony-winning actor, playwright, screenwriter, August: Osage County (born in Oklahoma)
- Brian Levant, film director, The Flintstones, Beethoven, Snow Dogs, Are We There Yet?
- Max Levchin, co-founder of PayPal and Yelp (born in Ukraine)
- Mel Leven, songwriter
- Edward H. Levi, president of University of Chicago 1968–75, U.S. attorney general 1975–77
- Charles Levin, actor, Alice, Capital News
- Gabe Levin, American-Israeli player in Israeli Basketball Premier League
- Al Levine, pitcher for seven MLB teams
- Samm Levine, actor, Freaks and Geeks
- Ted Levine, actor, The Silence of the Lambs, Monk (born in Ohio)
- King Levinsky, boxer, heavyweight contender
- Steven Levitan, TV director, screenwriter and producer; creator of Just Shoot Me! and Modern Family
- Steven Levitt, economist, author of Freakonomics
- Marv Levy, coach and general manager for Buffalo Bills, member of Pro Football Hall of Fame
- Greg Lewis, NFL wide receiver 2003–10
- J. Hamilton Lewis, congressman for two states, U.S. senator of Illinois (born in Virginia)
- John L. Lewis, Illinois coal miner, president of United Mine Workers of America (born in Iowa)
- Lena Morrow Lewis, suffragist, Socialist
- Meade Lux Lewis, jazz musician
- Monica Lewis, singer and actress, The Strip, The D.I., Excuse My Dust, Affair with a Stranger
- Ramsey Lewis, radio personality and Grammy-winning jazz musician, "The 'In' Crowd"
- J.C. Leyendecker, illustrator (born in Germany)

Li–Ln

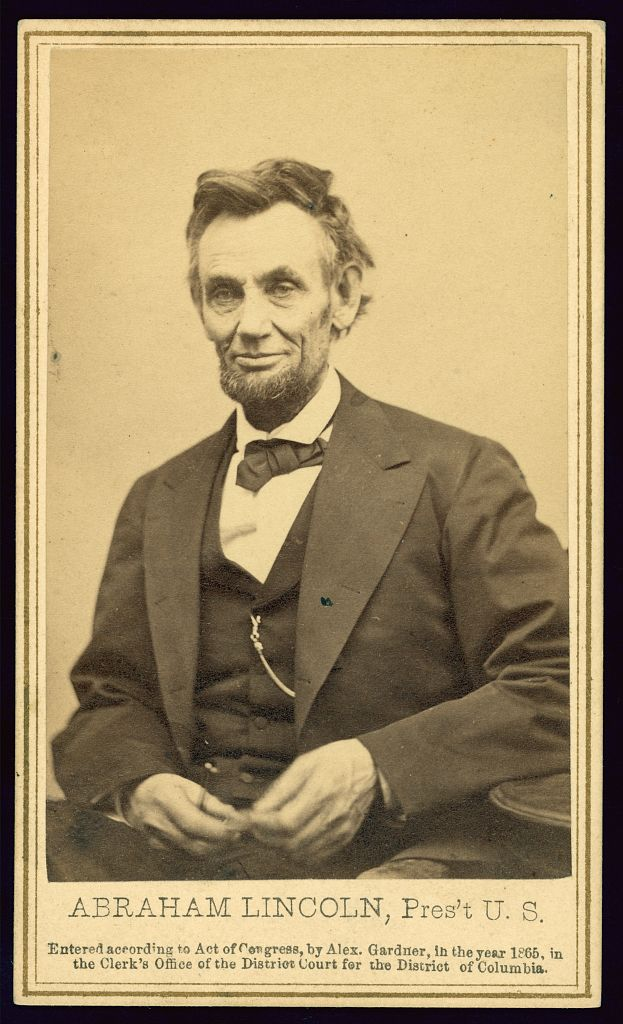
Abraham Lincoln

- Anna Li, gymnast, NCAA champion for UCLA (born in Nevada)
- Jimmy John Liautaud, founder of Jimmy John's sandwich chain
- Marcus Liberty, pro basketball player
- George Lichty, cartoonist, Grin and Bear It
- Dennis Lick, offensive tackle for Chicago Bears 1976–81
- E. J. Liddell, NBA forward, two-time Illinois Mr. Basketball
- Don Liddle, pitcher for 1954 World Series champion New York Giants
- Jeffrey Lieber, TV writer and producer, Lost
- Jennifer Lien, actress, Star Trek: Voyager
- DeAndre Liggins, pro basketball player
- Lori Lightfoot, 56th mayor of Chicago (born in Ohio)
- Anita Lihme, princess of Bohemia
- David E. Lilienthal, chairman, Atomic Energy Commission 1946–50
- Arlene Limas, world and Olympic champion in taekwondo
- Abbey Lincoln, singer and actress
- Abraham Lincoln, 16th President of the United States, Illinois lawyer and legislator, writer of Gettysburg Address, issuer of Emancipation Proclamation (born in Kentucky)
- Abraham Lincoln II, grandson of Abraham Lincoln
- Jessie Harlan Lincoln, granddaughter of Abraham Lincoln
- Mamie Lincoln, granddaughter of Abraham Lincoln
- Mary Todd Lincoln, Abraham Lincoln's wife (born in Kentucky, died in Illinois)
- Robert Todd Lincoln, attorney, U.S. ambassador to United Kingdom, secretary of war, president of Pullman Company, Abraham Lincoln's son
- Tad Lincoln, youngest son of Abraham Lincoln, died at 18
- Thomas Lincoln, father of Abraham Lincoln, lived in Illinois 1831–51 (born in Virginia)
- Katie Lind, pro soccer player
- Mike Lind, NFL and Notre Dame fullback
- Edward Lindberg, athlete, relay gold medalist in 1912 Summer Olympics
- Jim Lindeman, MLB outfielder 1986–94
- Fannie B. Linderman, educator, entertainer, and writer
- Charles Magnus Lindgren, shipping executive (born in Sweden)
- John R. Lindgren, banking executive, son of Charles M. Lindgren
- Justa Lindgren, football player for Illinois 1898–1901, coach of 1904 Big Ten champions
- Benjamin F. Lindheimer, horse racing, owner of Washington Park Race Track and Arlington Park
- Vachel Lindsay, poet
- Chuck Lindstrom, catcher, tripled in only MLB at-bat
- Freddie Lindstrom, Hall of Fame third baseman
- Ed Linke, MLB pitcher 1933–38
- Art Linson, producer, The Untouchables, Heat, Fight Club, Into the Wild
- Dan Lipinski, politician (Democrat), U.S. representative 2005–21
- William O. Lipinski, politician (Democrat), U.S. representative 1993–2005
- Clara Lipman, 19th-century stage actress
- Johnny Lira, boxer, USBA lightweight champ
- Peter Lisagor, journalist
- Rusty Lisch, quarterback for Notre Dame and St. Louis Cardinals
- Jerome Edward Listecki, archbishop of Milwaukee, Wisconsin
- Little Walter, blues musician (born in Louisiana)
- J. J. Liu, professional poker player (born in California)
- Robert Livingston, actor, The Three Mesquiteers
- Shaun Livingston, NBA forward 2004–19, three-time champion and executive with Golden State Warriors
- Danny Lloyd, actor, The Shining
- Scott Lloyd, NBA player 1976–82
- Vince Lloyd, baseball broadcaster

Lo–Lp

- Dick Locher, Pulitzer-winning cartoonist, writer-artist of Dick Tracy
- Allan Loeb, screenwriter, Wall Street: Money Never Sleeps, The Switch
- Marshall Loeb, magazine editor
- Kelly Loeffler, U.S. senator of Georgia 2020–21
- Jo Sullivan Loesser, Tony Award-nominated actress
- Frank J. Loesch, chief of Chicago Crime Commission (born in New York)
- Nils Lofgren, musician, member of Bruce Springsteen E Street Band
- Johnny Loftus, Hall of Fame jockey, two-time Kentucky Derby winner, 1919 Triple Crown
- David Logan, 19th-century mayor of Portland, Oregon
- Janice Logan, actress, Opened by Mistake, Dr. Cyclops
- John A. Logan, politician, Civil War general, U.S. representative, U.S. senator
- John Alexander Logan Jr., Medal of Honor winner, killed in combat
- John Logan, screenwriter, Gladiator, The Aviator, Skyfall (born in California)
- Stephen T. Logan, law partner of Abraham Lincoln
- Gary Loizzo, musician with The American Breed
- Joseph Lombardo, organized crime figure
- Dutch Lonborg, basketball coach, Northwestern all-time leader in victories, Hall of Fame
- Chuck Long, quarterback and coach, Heisman Trophy runner-up, College Football Hall of Fame (born in Oklahoma)
- Fred T. Long, baseball player, football coach
- Herman Long, MLB infielder 1889–1904
- Richard Long, actor, The Big Valley, Nanny and the Professor, Bourbon Street Beat, House on Haunted Hill
- Shelley Long, actress, Second City, Northwestern, Cheers, Troop Beverly Hills, The Brady Bunch Movie (born in Indiana)
- Frank Loomis, hurdler, gold medalist in 1920 Summer Olympics
- Horatio G. Loomis, a founder of Chicago Board of Trade (born in Vermont)
- John Patrick Looney, gangster from Rock Island, inspired character in Road to Perdition
- Al Lopez, manager of White Sox 1950s, 1960s (born in Florida)
- Ramón E. López, space physicist
- Robert Lord, Oscar-winning screenwriter
- Robert Lorenz, film producer, American Sniper, Mystic River
- Fred Lorenzen, auto racer, winner of 1965 Daytona 500
- William Lorimer, banker and politician
- Dave Losso, stand-up comedian
- George Lott, five-time U.S. doubles champion, 1931 US Open finalist
- Julia Louis-Dreyfus, actress, Second City, The Practical Theatre Company, Northwestern, Seinfeld (born in New York)
- Lee Loughnane, musician with band Chicago
- Tony Lovato, musician, member of band Mest
- Bob Love, three-time All-Star for Chicago Bulls (born in Louisiana)
- John Arthur Love, governor of Colorado 1963–73
- Elijah Lovejoy, abolitionist, editor (born in Maine)
- Owen Lovejoy, minister, U.S. representative (born in Maine)
- Frank Orren Lowden, politician (Republican), U.S. representative, governor of Illinois 1917–21 (born in Minnesota)
- Grover Lowdermilk, MLB pitcher 1909–20 (born in Indiana)
- Fred Lowenthal, college football coach
- Britt Lower, actress, Man Seeking Woman
- Charles Lowman, surgeon awarded Presidential Medal of Freedom
- Lynn Lowry, actress
- Alexander Loyd, mayor of Chicago 1840–41 (born in New York)
- Jewell Loyd, basketball player, top pick of 2015 WNBA draft, two-time WNBA champion, 2020 Olympic gold medalist

Lq–Lz

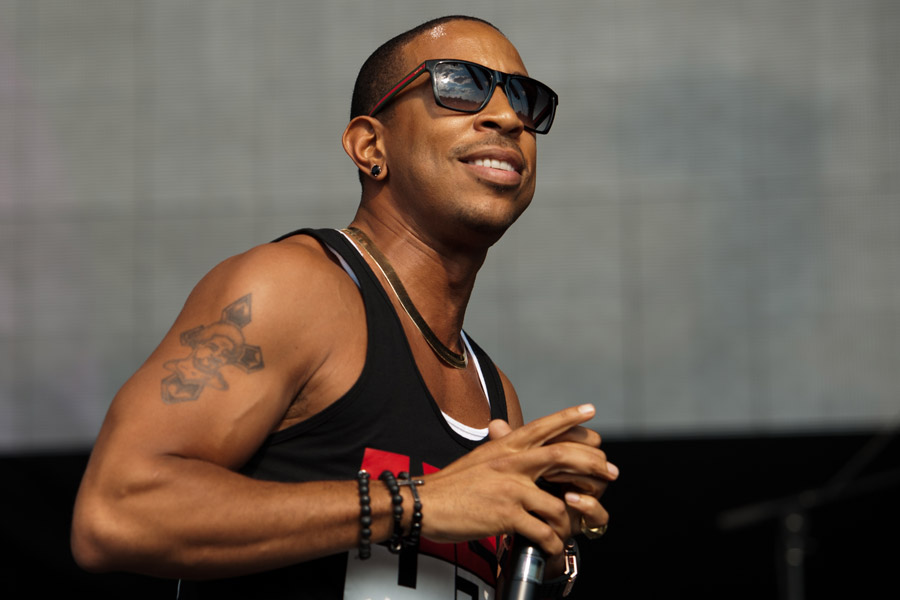
Ludacris

- Scott W. Lucas, lawyer, U.S. representative, U.S. senator 1939–51
- Sid Luckman, quarterbacked Chicago Bears to four NFL championships (born in New York)
- Ludacris (Christopher Bridges), Grammy Award-winning rapper and actor, The Fast and the Furious
- William H. Luers, ambassador to Czechoslovakia, Venezuela
- Larry Lujack, radio personality (born in Iowa)
- Ned Luke, actor, Grand Theft Auto V
- Deanna Lund, actress, Land of the Giants
- Helen Lundeberg, painter
- Carl Lundgren, MLB pitcher 1902–09
- Paul Lusk, basketball coach
- Hamilton Luske, Oscar-winning animator, Mary Poppins
- Greg Luzinski, outfielder for Chicago White Sox and 1980 World Series champion Philadelphia Phillies
- Abe Lyman, bandleader
- Jane Lynch, actress and comedian, Glee, The 40-Year-Old Virgin, Julie & Julia, A Mighty Wind, Hollywood Game Night
- John Lynch, NFL defensive back 1993–2008, Super Bowl XXXVII champion, Hall of Fame, general manager of San Francisco 49ers
- Jordan Lynch, quarterback for Northern Illinois and 2015 CFL champion Edmonton Eskimos
- Bird Lynn, catcher for 1917 World Series champion White Sox
- Fred Lynn, outfielder for Boston Red Sox, California Angels, 1975 American League MVP
- Ginger Lynn, adult-film actress
- Janet Lynn, five-time U.S. champion figure skater
- Marjorie Lynn, singer, National Barn Dance (born in Wisconsin)
- Ted Lyons, 21-year pitcher for Chicago White Sox, member of Hall of Fame (born in Louisiana)
- Evan Lysacek, figure skater, 2010 Winter Olympics gold medalist and 2009 world champion, Sullivan Award winner

== M ==
Maa–Mag

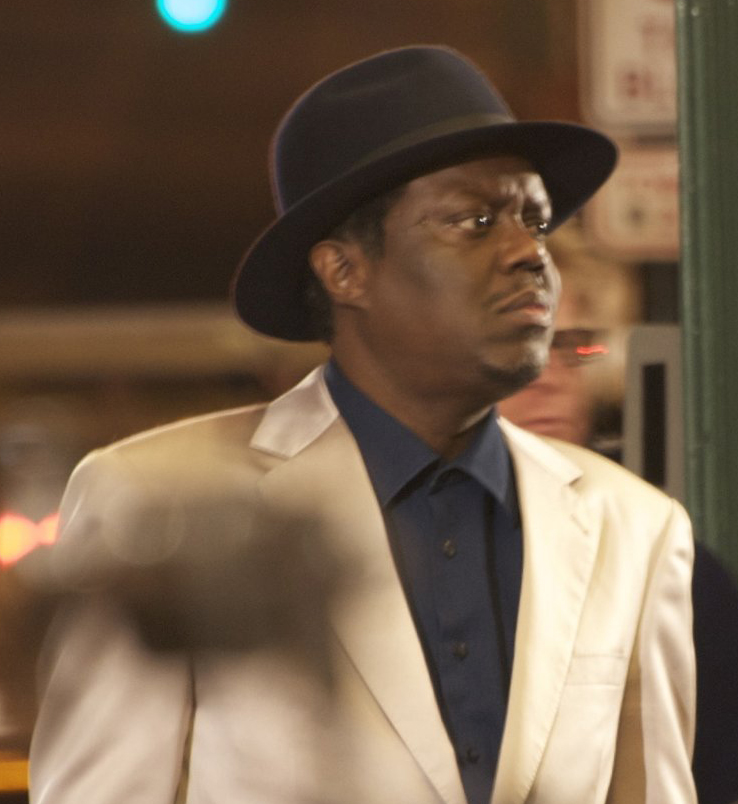
Bernie Mac

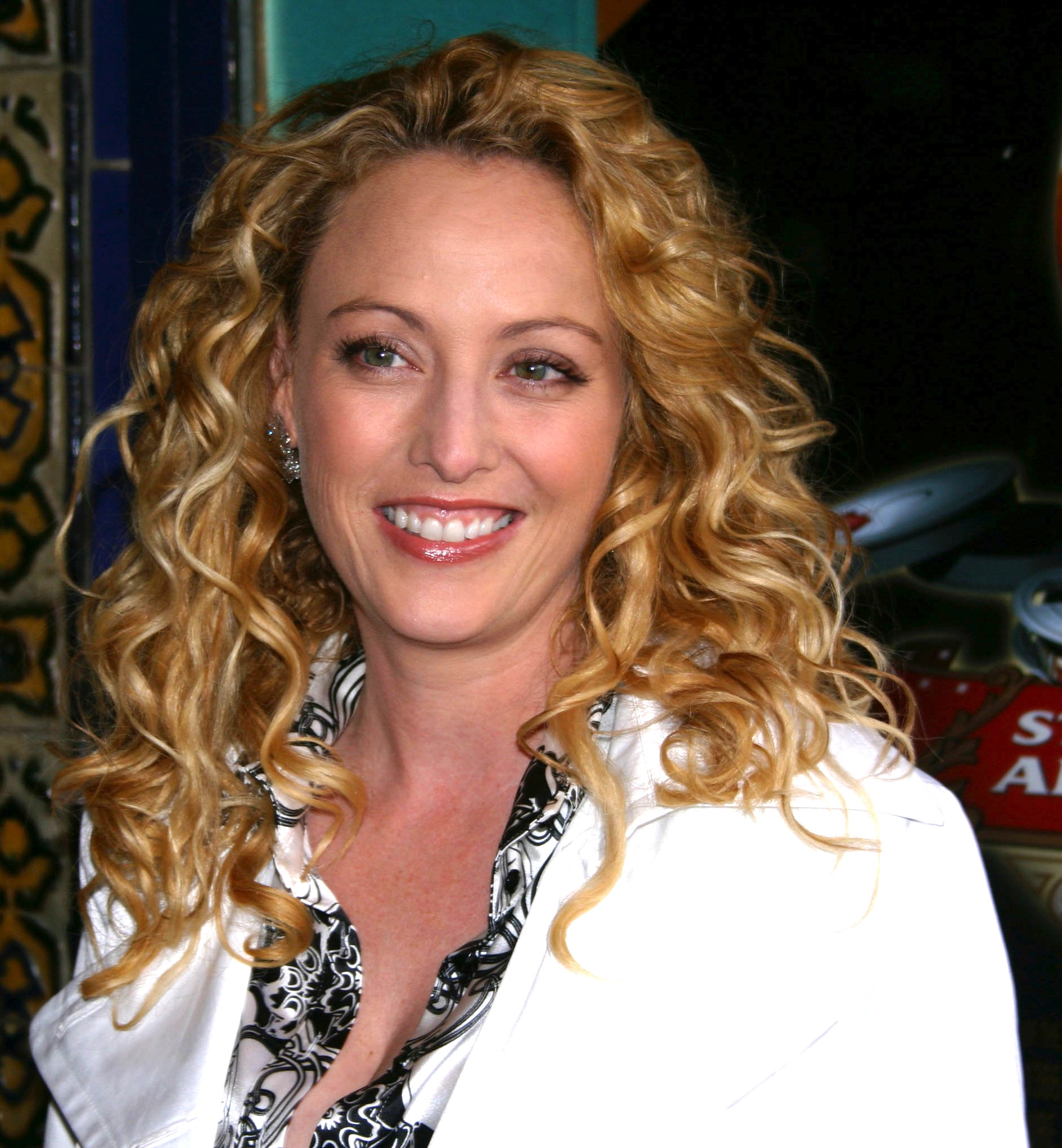
Virginia Madsen

- Bernie Mac, actor, comedian, The Bernie Mac Show, Mr. 3000, Bad Santa, Ocean's Eleven and its sequels
- Charles MacArthur, Oscar-winning screenwriter, Chicago journalist, playwright (born in Pennsylvania)
- Hayes MacArthur, comedian, actor, writer, Angie Tribeca, Perfect Couples, The Game Plan
- Franklyn MacCormack, radio personality (born in Iowa)
- Charles B. Macdonald, won first U.S. Amateur tournament, built Chicago Golf Club (born in Canada)
- Hazel MacDonald, film critic and war correspondent
- Elaine "Spanky" MacFarlane, singer with Spanky and Our Gang
- Justina Machado, actress, Six Feet Under, Missing, Three Rivers, One Day at a Time
- Christy Mack, model, stripper, porn actress
- Helen Mack, actress, His Girl Friday, The Son of Kong, She
- Peter F. Mack Jr., pilot, seven-term U.S. representative
- Sam Mack, guard for five NBA teams
- Pete Mackanin, manager for Cincinnati Reds, Philadelphia Phillies
- Felix Mackiewicz, MLB outfielder 1941–47
- Rob Mackowiak, outfielder for Pittsburgh Pirates and White Sox
- Archibald MacLeish, poet and writer, three-time Pulitzer Prize winner
- Fred MacMurray, actor, My Three Sons, Double Indemnity, The Caine Mutiny, The Absent-Minded Professor, The Apartment
- Tress MacNeille, voice actress, The Simpsons, Futurama, Animaniacs (born in California)
- Bart Macomber, halfback for Illinois 1914–15 national champions
- Earle S. MacPherson, automotive engineer, developed MacPherson strut
- Franklin MacVeagh, banker, U.S. secretary of the treasury 1909–13 (born in Pennsylvania)
- John Macy, civil service chief for Presidents Eisenhower and Kennedy
- Martin B. Madden, U.S. representative 1905–28 (born in England)
- David M. Maddox, retired U.S. Army four-star general
- Amy Madigan, Oscar-nominated actress, Carnivàle, Field of Dreams, Uncle Buck, Pollock, Gone Baby Gone
- Edward Rell Madigan, U.S. representative 1973–91, U.S. secretary of agriculture 1991–93
- Lisa Madigan, attorney general of Illinois 2003–19
- Michael Madigan, state representative 1971–2021, speaker of the House 1997–2021, state Democratic Party chairman
- Slip Madigan, college football player, three-sport coach
- Cleo Madison, silent-film actress
- Sarah Danielle Madison, actress
- Bill Madlock, MLB third baseman 1973–88, four-time batting champion
- Michael Madsen, actor, Reservoir Dogs, Kill Bill, The Natural, Thelma & Louise, Donnie Brasco, The Hateful Eight
- Virginia Madsen, Oscar-nominated actress, Sideways, Candyman, Dune, The Number 23, The Rainmaker, Joy
- Mike Magac, NFL lineman 1960–66
- Mike Magee, soccer player for Chicago Fire
- Corey Maggette, forward for six NBA teams
- Magic Sam, blues musician (born in Mississippi)
- Elizabeth Magie, inventor of game that became Monopoly
- Francis Joseph Magner, Catholic bishop
- Sandra Magnus, astronaut, aboard final Space Shuttle
- Christine Magnuson, swimmer, two-time Olympic medalist

Mah–Maq

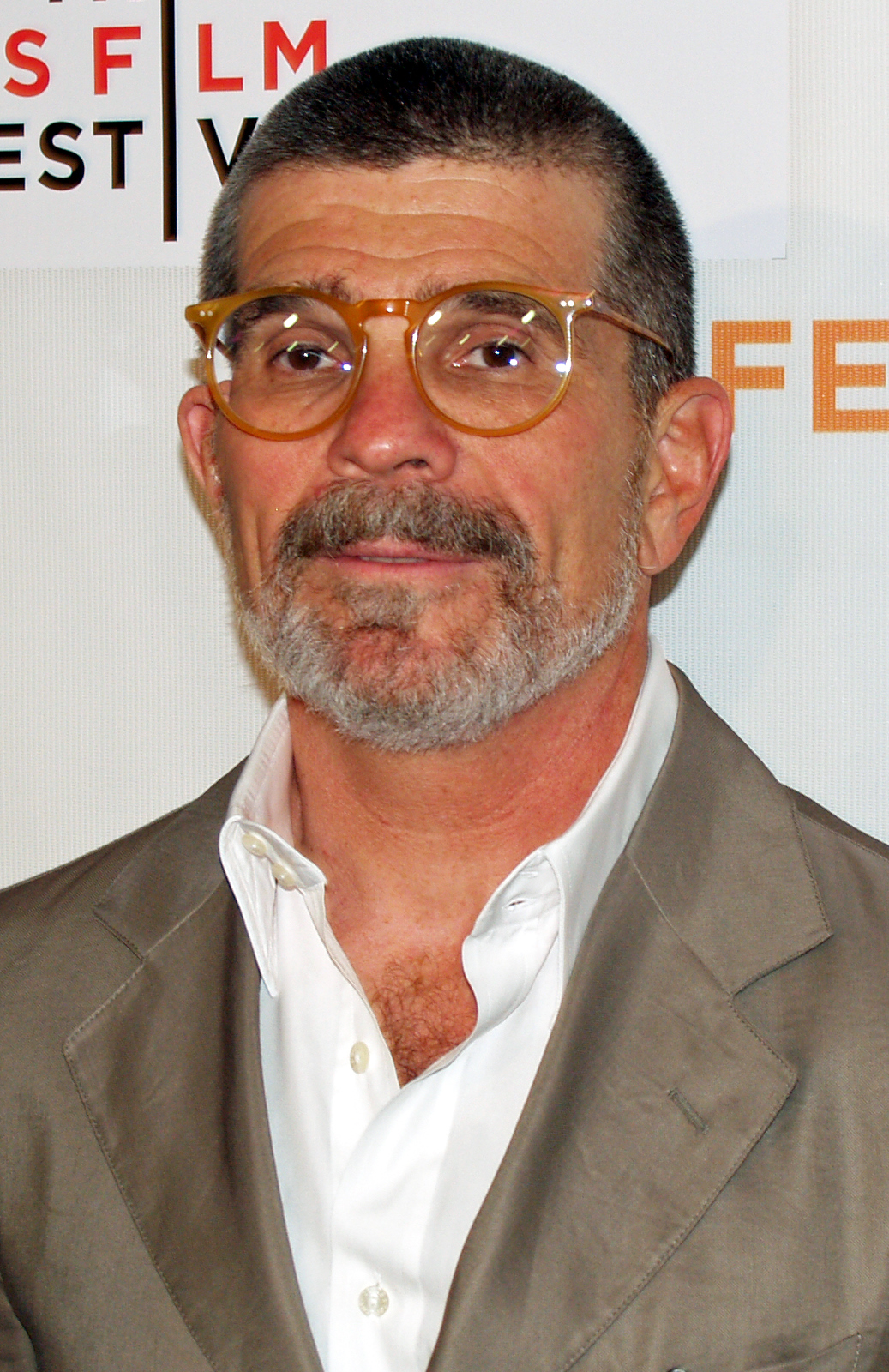
David Mamet

- Ron Mahay, relief pitcher for eight MLB teams
- Maureen Maher, host of CBS series 48 Hours Mystery (born in Michigan)
- John Lee Mahin, screenwriter, Treasure Island, Dr. Jekyll and Mr. Hyde, Show Boat
- Jock Mahoney, actor, Tarzan films, Yancy Derringer
- John Mahoney, actor, Marty Crane on Frasier, Moonstruck, Barton Fink, Primal Fear, Eight Men Out (born in England)
- Vivian Maier, photographer, Finding Vivian Maier (born in New York)
- Gil Mains, defensive tackle for Detroit Lions 1953–61
- J. Earl Major, judge, U.S. representative
- Rebecca Makkai, novelist and short-story writer
- Karl Malden, Oscar-winning actor, On the Waterfront, A Streetcar Named Desire, Gypsy, The Cincinnati Kid, Patton, The Streets of San Francisco
- Terrence Malick, Oscar-nominated filmmaker, Days of Heaven, The Thin Red Line, Tree of Life
- John Malkovich, Oscar-nominated actor, Con Air, In the Line of Fire, Rounders, Secretariat, Red, Being John Malkovich
- Sax Mallard, jazz musician
- Dorothy Malone, Oscar-winning actress, The Big Sleep, Written on the Wind, Man of a Thousand Faces, Peyton Place
- Frank Maloney, college football coach
- Jasper A. Maltby, Civil War general, gunsmith (born in Ohio)
- David Malukas, auto racer
- David Mamet, Oscar-nominated screenwriter, Pulitzer Prize-winning playwright, director, Glengarry Glen Ross, The Verdict, Wag the Dog, Hoffa, The Untouchables
- Andy Manar, state senator, deputy governor
- Gail Mancuso, TV director, Roseanne, Modern Family, Friends
- Sammy Mandell, lightweight boxing champion 1926–30
- Larry Manetti, actor, Magnum, P.I.
- Harry Manfredini, film composer
- Camryn Manheim, actress, The Practice, Ghost Whisperer, Law & Order
- Lewis Manilow, real estate developer, co-founder of Museum of Contemporary Art, Chicago
- Sebastian Maniscalco, stand-up comedian and actor, Green Book, About My Father
- Carol Mann, golfer, won 38 LPGA tournaments (born in New York)
- James Robert Mann, politician (Republican), attorney, Chicago alderman, U.S. Representative 1897–1922
- Michael Mann, television and Oscar-nominated film director, Miami Vice, Heat, The Insider, Manhunter, Collateral, Ali
- Joe Mantegna, actor, voice actor, Criminal Minds, The Godfather Part III, House of Games, Joan of Arcadia, The Rat Pack, The Simpsons
- Joe Mantello, actor and Broadway director
- Jay Manuel, make-up artist, America's Next Top Model
- Ray Manzarek, co-founder and keyboardist for The Doors

Mar–Mas

- Paul Marcinkus, archbishop and president of Vatican Bank
- Carol Marin, television and newspaper journalist
- Edna Marion, actress
- Shawn Marion, NBA forward 1999–2015, four-time All-Star
- Mary Beth Marley, figure skater
- Jerry Markbreit, professional football referee
- Gene Markey, screenwriter, decorated naval officer, Chicago Academy of Fine Arts alumnus, husband of Hedy Lamarr and Myrna Loy
- Morris Markin, founder of Checker Motors Company, owner of Yellow Cab (born in Russia)
- Harry Markowitz, Nobel Prize-winning economist
- Clayton Marks, educator, soldier, banker and historian
- Brit Marling, writer, actress, Another Earth, Arbitrage, Babylon
- Jess Marlow, television journalist
- Jacques Marquette, 17th-century explorer (born in France)
- Frank Clarence Mars, candy maker (born in Minnesota)
- Forrest Mars Jr., billionaire Mars family scion
- Kenneth Mars, actor, Young Frankenstein, The Producers, What's Up, Doc?, The Little Mermaid
- Albert L. Marsh, metallurgist, co-inventor of nichrome
- Benjamin F. Marsh, railroad czar, Civil War soldier, U.S. representative
- Frank Lewis Marsh, Seventh-day Adventist biologist, educator and young Earth creationist
- Fred Marsh, MLB infielder 1949–56
- George Marsh, decorated Civil War soldier
- Benjamin H. Marshall, architect of Chicago hotels
- Francis Marshall, brigadier general, World War I
- George Marshall, film director, You Can't Cheat an Honest Man, Destry Rides Again, Houdini, How the West Was Won
- Joan Marshall, actress
- Jim Marshall, MLB first baseman 1958–62
- Mike Marshall, outfielder for four MLB teams
- Noel Marshall, film producer
- Samuel S. Marshall, lawyer, 19th-century politician
- William Marshall, singer, bandleader, husband of Ginger Rogers
- June Martel, actress, Santa Fe Stampede, Forlorn River
- Andra Martin, actress, The Thing That Couldn't Die, Up Periscope
- Billy Martin, tennis player and coach
- Cecil Martin, NFL fullback 1999–2003
- Chuck Martin, football head coach, Miami of Ohio
- Cuonzo Martin, basketball head coach, Cal, Tennessee, Missouri
- James Stewart Martin, Civil War general, U.S. Representative
- Kate Martin, guard for two-time NCAA runner-up Iowa, 18th pick of 2024 WNBA draft
- LaRue Martin, center for Loyola and Portland Trail Blazers, top pick of 1972 NBA draft
- Lynn Morley Martin, U.S. Representative 1981–91, U.S. Secretary of Labor 1991–93
- Marcella Martin, actress, Gone With the Wind, West of Tombstone
- Nan Martin, actress, Goodbye, Columbus, The Other Side of the Mountain, The Drew Carey Show
- Todd Martin, pro tennis player, U.S. Open and Australian Open finalist
- Richard Martini, writer and director, Cannes Man
- Carl Shipp Marvel, organic chemist
- Dick Marx, jazz musician, ad jingle writer
- Richard Marx, singer and songwriter
- Russell Maryland, NFL defensive tackle, College Football Hall of Fame
- Ron Masak, actor, Murder, She Wrote
- Ella Masar, pro soccer player
- Phil Masi, MLB catcher 1939–52
- Bobby Joe Mason, basketball player for Bradley and Harlem Globetrotters
- Noah M. Mason, politician (Republican), U.S. Representative 1937–63 (born in Wales)
- Roswell B. Mason, mayor during Great Chicago Fire (born in New York)
- William E. Mason, U.S. representative, U.S. senator (born in New York)
- Michael Masser, songwriter, "Greatest Love of All"
- Edgar Lee Masters, author and poet (born in Kansas)
- Mary Elizabeth Mastrantonio, Oscar-nominated actress, Scarface, The Color of Money, The Abyss, The Perfect Storm, Limitless

Mat–Maz

- Mary Matalin, presidential advisor, television commentator, author
- Carole Mathews, actress and radio personality
- Milton W. Mathews, 19th-century publisher and politician
- T.J. Mathews, MLB pitcher 1995–2002
- Art Mathisen, basketball player for Illinois
- Jake Matijevic, NASA engineer, developed Mars rovers
- Marlee Matlin, Oscar-winning actress, Children of a Lesser God
- Thad Matta, head basketball coach for Ohio State, Butler
- Joel Aldrich Matteson, railroad executive, governor of Illinois 1853–57 (born in New York)
- Clyde Matthews, college football coach
- Denny Matthews, baseball broadcaster (born in Florida)
- Wid Matthews, baseball executive
- Ken Mattingly, astronaut and admiral
- Carl Mauck, center for four NFL teams, coach
- John Mauer, college basketball coach
- Bill Mauldin, Pulitzer Prize-winning cartoonist, Willie and Joe (born in New Mexico)
- Jeff Mauro, television personality, Food Network
- Jason Maxiell, NBA forward 2005–15
- Dal Maxvill, MLB infielder, played in five World Series
- Holle Thee Maxwell, singer and songwriter
- Lucien Maxwell, hunter, owned ranch where Billy the Kid was killed
- Philip Maxwell, 19th-century doctor, namesake of Chicago's Maxwell Street (born in Vermont)
- William Keepers Maxwell, fiction editor of New Yorker 1936–75
- Tiny Maxwell, football player, sportswriter, namesake of Maxwell Award
- Donald May, actor, The Roaring 20s
- Elaine May, actress, director, Oscar-nominated screenwriter, alumna of University of Chicago and Second City (born in Pennsylvania)
- George S. May, businessman, golf promoter
- John L. May, archbishop of St. Louis 1980–92
- William L. May, politician, first mayor of Springfield, Illinois
- Marilyn Maye, singer (born in Kansas)
- Jonathan Mayer, first US DOJ chief science and technology adviser and chief artificial intelligence officer
- Oscar F. Mayer, founder of Oscar Mayer meat company (born in Germany)
- Oscar G. Mayer Sr., chairman of Oscar Mayer 1955–65
- Oscar G. Mayer Jr., chairman of Oscar Mayer 1966–2009
- Benjamin Mayfield, cowboy, outlaw
- Curtis Mayfield, soul, R&B and funk singer, songwriter, Rock and Roll Hall of Fame, Grammy Legend Award
- William Mayfield, cattleman, militia leader (born in Tennessee)
- Jackie Mayo, outfielder for Philadelphia Phillies 1948–53
- Margaret Mayo, playwright
- Stanley Mazor, co-inventor of first microprocessor
- Rob Mazurek, musician
- Marin Mazzie, Tony Award-nominated actress

Mca–Mcd

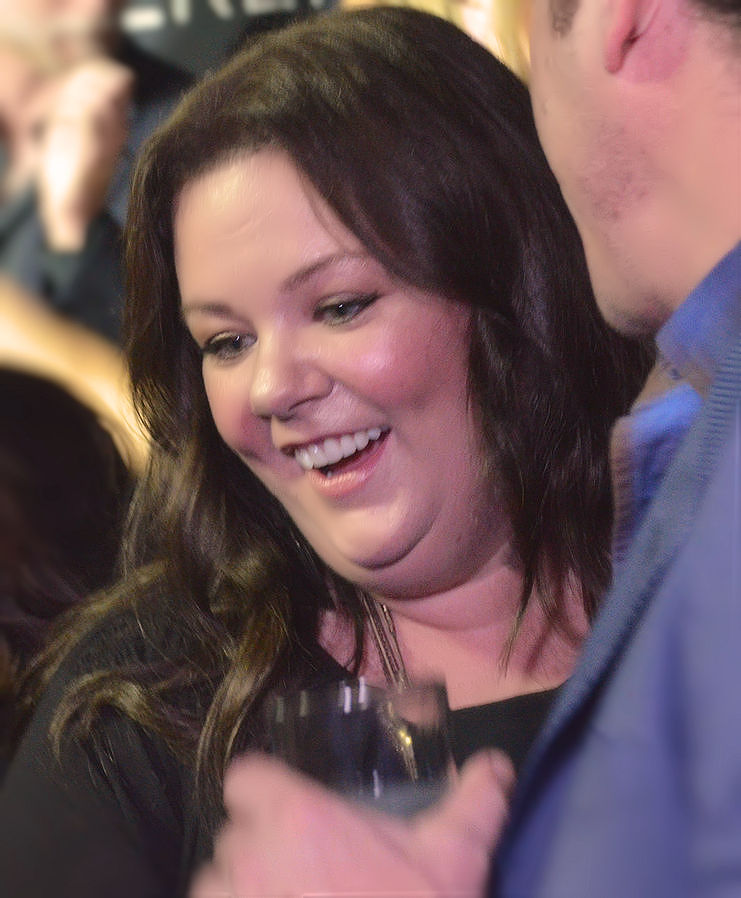
Melissa McCarthy

Frances McDormand

- Zach McAllister, pitcher for Cleveland Indians
- James McAndrews, building commissioner, nine-term U.S. representative (born in Rhode Island)
- Des McAnuff, theater director
- Arthur B. McBride, businessman who founded the Cleveland Browns football team
- Brian McBride, soccer player, U.S. national team, MSL and English Premier League
- Chi McBride, actor, Hawaii Five-0, I, Robot, The John Larroquette Show, Boston Public, Human Target
- Steve McCall, drummer
- Oliver McCall, boxer, WBC heavyweight champ 1994–95
- Mercedes McCambridge, Oscar-winning actress, All the King's Men, Giant, Johnny Guitar, The Exorcist
- Terrence McCann, freestyle wrestling gold medalist at 1960 Summer Olympics
- Mel McCants, NBA player for Los Angeles Lakers 1989–90
- Justin McCareins, NFL wide receiver 2001–08
- Larry McCarren, center for Green Bay Packers 1973–84, commentator, Packers Hall of Fame
- Alex McCarthy, MLB infielder 1910–17
- J. J. McCarthy, NFL quarterback
- Jenny McCarthy, model, actress, author, activist, Scream 3, Dirty Love, Witless Protection, The View
- Joanne McCarthy, basketball player, UIC all-time scoring leader
- Johnny McCarthy, MLB first baseman 1934–48
- Melissa McCarthy, Emmy-winning, Oscar-nominated actress, Mike & Molly, Bridesmaids, Identity Thief, Tammy
- Peggy McCarthy, rowing bronze medalist, 1976 Olympics
- Tim McCarthy, wounded Secret Service agent for Ronald Reagan
- Todd McCarthy, film critic
- Constance McCashin, actress, Knots Landing
- Ed McCaskey, chairman of Chicago Bears 1983–1999
- George McCaskey, chairman of Chicago Bears
- Michael McCaskey, chairman of Chicago Bears 1999–2011
- Virginia Halas McCaskey, owner of Chicago Bears
- Hazel A. McCaskrin, politician
- Harry M. McCaskrin, politician
- Sergio McClain, basketball player for Illinois
- Gerald McClellan, middleweight boxing champion 1991–95
- Kathleen McClellan, actress, 1988 Miss Illinois Teen USA
- John Alexander McClernand, Civil War general, advisor to Presidents Lincoln and Grant, U.S. Representative
- Robert McClory, U.S. Representative 1963–83
- Alice Moore McComas, writer, editor, lecturer, social reformer
- Brooks McCormick, CEO of International Harvester
- Mike McCormack, Hall of Fame NFL player, coach and executive
- Cyrus Hall McCormick, businessman, inventor of McCormick Reaper (born in Virginia)
- Edith Rockefeller McCormick, socialite, patron of opera and Brookfield Zoo
- Harold Fowler McCormick, chairman of International Harvester, husband of Edith Rockefeller
- Katharine McCormick, biologist, suffragist, philanthropist (born in Michigan)
- Robert R. McCormick, newspaper publisher and philanthropist
- Ruth Hanna McCormick, suffragist, U.S. Representative 1929–31
- Walter McCornack, first football coach for Northwestern
- Joseph McCoy, cattle baron
- LisaRaye McCoy, actress, All of Us, Single Ladies
- Keith McCready, professional pool player, actor in The Color of Money
- Johnston McCulley, author, creator of Zorro
- John T. McCutcheon, cartoonist
- Jim McDermott, U.S. representative of Washington 1989–2017
- Darren W. McDew, U.S. Air Force general
- Glenn McDonald, member of 1976 NBA champion Boston Celtics
- Ariel McDonald, basketball player; 2000 Israeli Basketball Premier League MVP
- Robert A. McDonald, chairman and CEO of Procter & Gamble, U.S. secretary of Veterans Affairs 2014–17
- John McDonough, president and CEO of Chicago Blackhawks 2007–20
- Frances McDormand, Oscar and Emmy-winning actress, Fargo, Blood Simple, Almost Famous, Moonrise Kingdom, Olive Kitteridge, Nomadland

Mce–Mcz

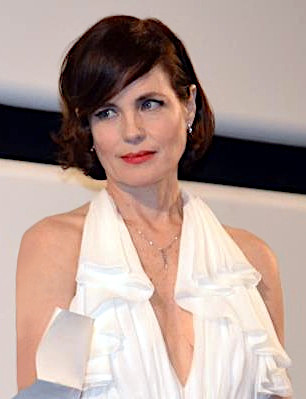
Elizabeth McGovern

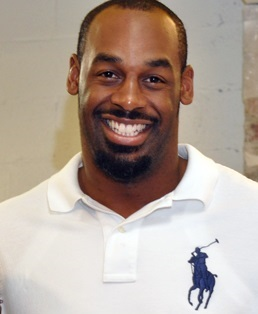
Donovan McNabb

- Ray McElroy, NFL defensive back 1995–2001
- Frank McErlane, organized crime figure
- Tatyana McFadden, wheelchair athlete, Paralympian, winner of Boston and Chicago marathons (born in Russia)
- Chappie McFarland, MLB pitcher 1902–06
- Packey McFarland, lightweight boxer
- T. J. McFarland, MLB relief pitcher
- Bill McGee, MLB pitcher 1935–42
- JaVale McGee, basketball player, three-time NBA champion, 2020 Olympics gold medalist
- Ralph McGehee, football player for Notre Dame, officer for CIA
- Carla McGhee, basketball player, two NCAA championships, 1996 Olympic gold medalist
- Tyler McGill, swimmer, gold medalist at 2012 London Olympics
- Joe McGinnity, MLB player in Hall of Fame
- William P. McGivern, novelist, books became films The Big Heat, Odds Against Tomorrow
- Elizabeth McGovern, Oscar-nominated actress, Ragtime, Ordinary People, Once Upon a Time in America, The Handmaid's Tale, Downton Abbey
- Roxana McGowan, silent-film actress
- Bob McGrath, television personality, Sesame Street
- Lamar McGriggs, pro football player
- Aaron McGruder, cartoonist, The Boondocks
- Roger McGuinn, musician, The Byrds
- Don McGuire, actor, Oscar-nominated screenwriter
- Kathryn McGuire, silent-film actress, Sherlock Jr.
- Jack McGurn, gangster with Chicago Outfit (born in Italy)
- Donald McHenry, ambassador to United Nations (born in Missouri)
- William McHenry, 19th-century soldier and politician
- Collin McHugh, MLB pitcher, member of 2017 World Series champion Houston Astros
- Tim McIlrath, musician, Rise Against
- Adam McKay, performer for Second City, screenwriter of Anchorman, film and documentary director (born in Pennsylvania)
- Lafe McKee, actor
- William Parker McKee, president of Shimer College
- Kevin McKenna, basketball player and coach
- Raymond S. McKeough, U.S. representative 1935–45
- William B. McKinley, U.S. representative 1905–21, senator 1921–26
- Billy McKinney, NBA and Northwestern player, mayor of Zion, Illinois
- Denny McLain, pitcher, 31-game winner for 1968 World Series champion Detroit Tigers
- John McLean, 19th-century U.S. senator (born in North Carolina)
- Frederic McLaughlin, first owner of Chicago Blackhawks
- Claude McLin, saxophonist
- Greg McMahon, college and NFL assistant coach
- Jim McMahon, quarterback of Super Bowl XX champion Chicago Bears (born in New Jersey)
- Sherrick McManis, NFL cornerback
- James McManus, professional poker player, author
- Marty McManus, MLB infielder 1920–34
- Tom McManus, linebacker, Jacksonville Jaguars 1995–99
- William Edward McManus, Roman Catholic bishop
- Sherman McMaster, Wild West outlaw and lawman
- Neysa McMein, illustrator and painter
- Steve McMichael, pro football player and coach, wrestler, radio personality (born in Texas)
- Ernie McMillan, offensive tackle for St. Louis Cardinals 1961–74
- Bob McMillen, player and coach, Arena Football League
- Jim McMillen, guard for 1923 Illinois national champions, Chicago Bears
- Rolla C. McMillen, lawyer, U.S. representative 1944–51
- Shellie McMillon, NBA and Bradley basketball player
- Mary Ann McMorrow, judge, Supreme Court of Illinois 1992–2006
- Donovan McNabb, six-time Pro Bowl quarterback for Philadelphia Eagles, Washington Redskins, TV commentator
- Jerel McNeal, all-time leading scorer for Marquette basketball
- Barbara McNair, singer, television personality and actress, Change of Habit, They Call Me Mister Tibbs!
- Andrew McNally, founder of Rand McNally company in 1868 (born in Northern Ireland)
- Tom McNamara, 40th mayor of Rockford
- John McNaughton, film and TV director, Wild Things, Mad Dog and Glory, Homicide: Life on the Street
- Don McNeill, radio personality
- Marcus McNeill, offensive tackle for San Diego Chargers 2006–11
- James McNerney, CEO of Boeing, 3M
- John McNulta, Civil War general, U.S. representative (born in New York)
- William Slavens McNutt, screenwriter, Huckleberry Finn
- James McParland, Chicago-based Pinkerton's detective, infiltrated Molly Maguires (born in Ireland)
- Jimmy McPartland, big-band cornet player
- Ryan McPartlin, actor, Chuck, Living With Fran
- Corey McPherrin, television journalist
- Samuel McRoberts, U.S. attorney under Andrew Jackson, U.S. senator
- Margaret McWade, actress, Mr. Deeds Goes to Town
- Doug McWeeny, MLB pitcher 1921–30
- Paulette McWilliams, singer

Md–Mh

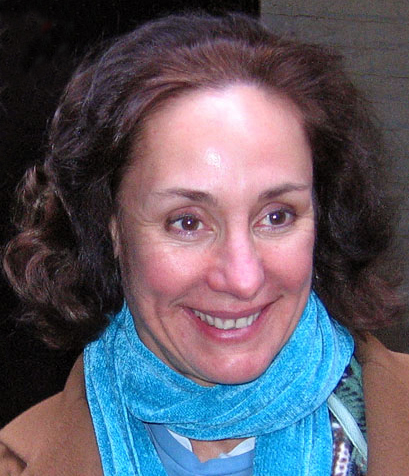
Laurie Metcalf

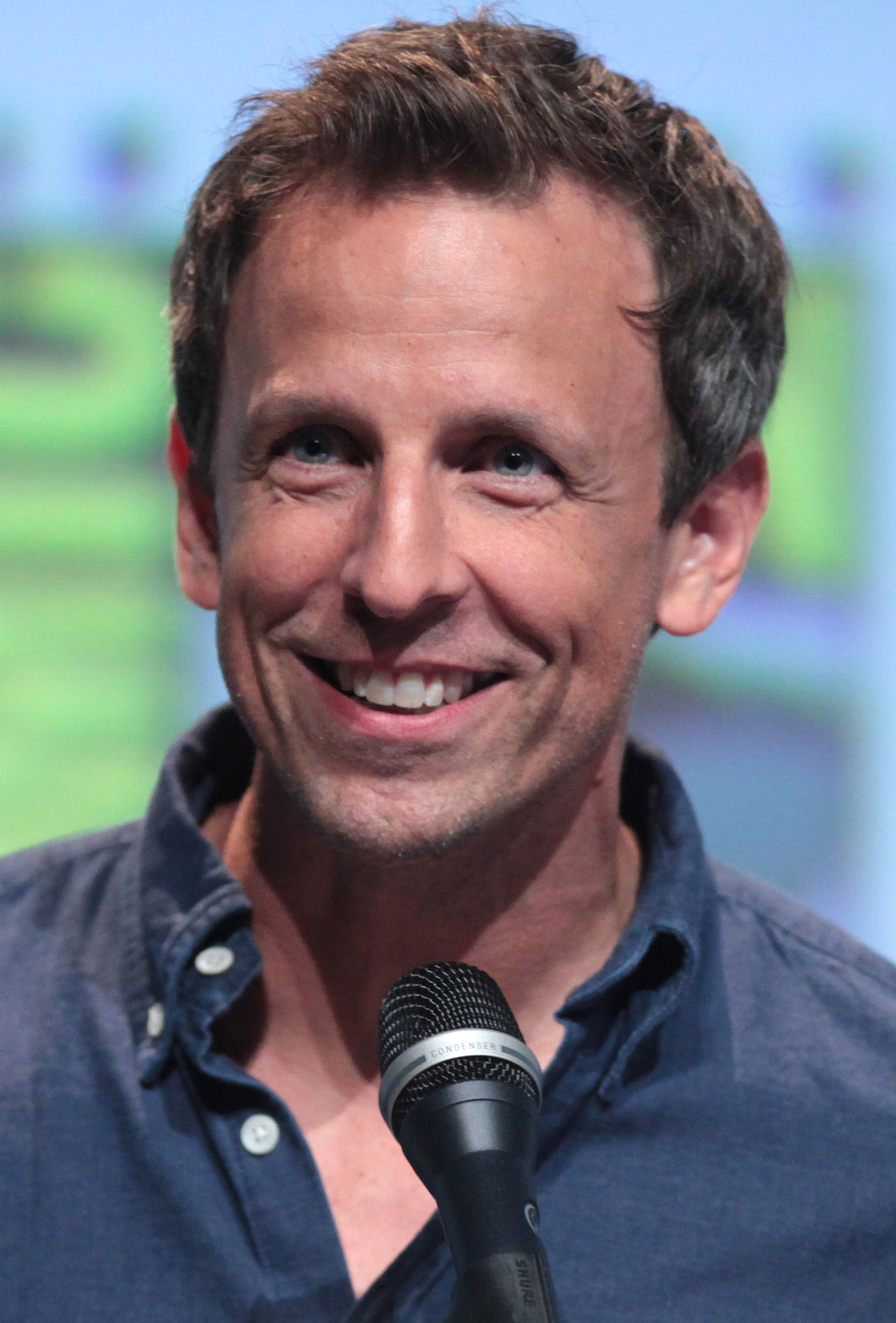
Seth Meyers

- George J. Mecherle, founder of State Farm Insurance
- David Meckler, ice hockey player
- Joseph Medill, publisher, mayor of Chicago 1871–73 (born in Canada)
- Chris Medina, singer-songwriter, American Idol contestant
- Mark Medoff, playwright, screenwriter, Children of a Lesser God
- Patrick Meek, speed skater
- Jayson Megna, NHL forward (born in Florida)
- Bill Mehlhorn, golfer, 1924 Western Open champion, third in U.S. Open
- Garry Meier, radio personality
- Katie Meier, basketball player for Duke, coach at Miami
- Merrill C. Meigs, pilot, newspaper executive, Meigs Field named for him
- Leo Melamed, CEO of Chicago Mercantile Exchange
- Gene Melchiorre, basketball player, 1951 top NBA draft pick, banned for point-shaving scandal
- Al Melgard, organist at Chicago Stadium 1930–74
- Ski Melillo, MLB infielder 1926–37
- Chuck Mellor, winner of 1925 Boston Marathon
- Rich Melman, restaurateur
- Lester Melrose, music producer
- Walter Melrose, music producer
- Bill Melton, MLB third baseman, sportscaster (born in Mississippi)
- Daniel Meltzer, Harvard law professor, Barack Obama deputy counsel
- David O. Meltzer, professor of medicine
- Rachel Melvin, actress, Dumb and Dumber To
- Rashaan Melvin, NFL cornerback
- John Willis Menard, first African-American elected to U.S. Congress, 1858
- Pierre Menard, fur trader, Illinois' first lieutenant governor (born in Canada)
- Carol Mendelsohn, TV executive, CSI and CSI:NY
- Rashard Mendenhall, running back for Illinois and Super Bowl XLIII champion Pittsburgh Steelers
- Susana Mendoza, politician, Illinois Comptroller
- Alex Meneses, actress, model, Dr. Quinn, Medicine Woman, Everybody Loves Raymond
- Sid Mercer, sportswriter
- Joanna Merlin, casting director, actress
- Charles Edward Merriam, political scientist, professor (born in Iowa)
- Doris Merrick, actress, The Big Noise, The Counterfeiters
- Ahmad Merritt, NFL wide receiver 2000–08
- Aries Merritt, hurdler, 2012 London Olympics gold medalist
- Bus Mertes, football coach, Kansas State, Drake
- Robert Meschbach, soccer player
- Laurie Metcalf, Emmy and Tony Award-winning, Oscar-nominated actress, Roseanne, The Conners, JFK, Internal Affairs, Toy Story, Lady Bird
- Ralph Metcalfe, sprinter, 100-meter silver medalist at 1936 Summer Olympics; politician (Democrat), U.S. representative
- Linda Metheny, gymnast
- Bert Metzger, football player
- Dick Meyer, journalist, CBS News, BBC America and NPR
- Joey Meyer, head basketball coach at DePaul 1984–97
- John Meyer, pro football player and coach
- Ray Meyer, Basketball Hall of Fame coach for DePaul 1942–1984
- Russ Meyer, MLB pitcher 1946–59
- Seth Meyers, television personality, Saturday Night Live, Late Night with Seth Meyers
- Mezz Mezzrow, jazz musician

Mi–Mn

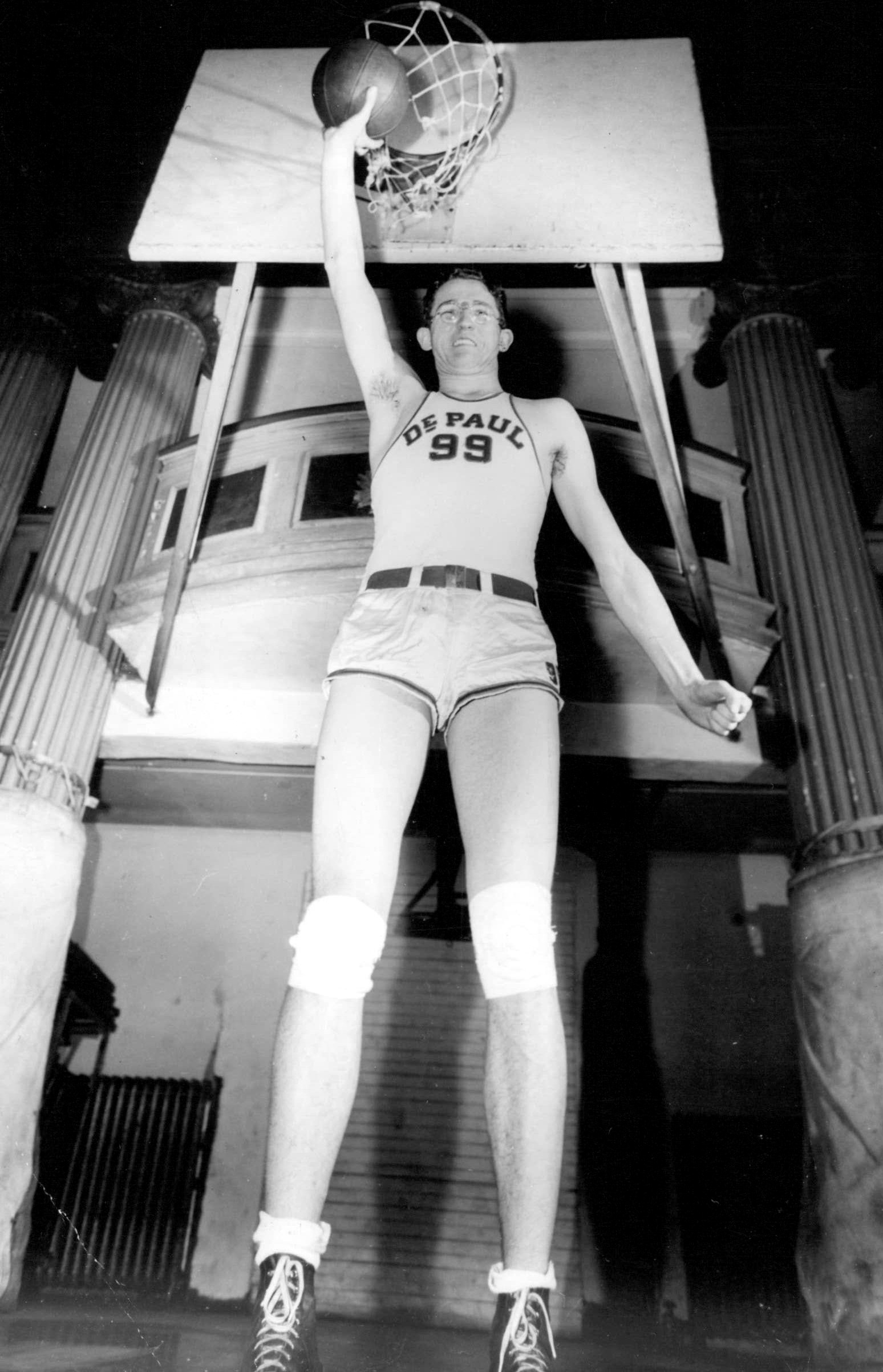
George Mikan

- Patrick Michaels, climatologist, senior fellow at Cato Institute
- M. Alfred Michaelson, banker, U.S. representative (born in Norway)
- Chris Michalak, MLB pitcher 1998–2006
- Laura Michalek, won 1979 Chicago Marathon at age 15
- Robert H. Michel, politician (Republican), U.S. representative for 38 years, House minority leader 1981–95
- Lucia Mida, golfer
- Ray Middleton, actor, Hurricane Smith, Lady for a Night, 1776
- Ludwig Mies van der Rohe, modernist architect (born in Prussia)
- Richard W. Mies, admiral, head of U.S. Strategic Command 1998–2001
- Ed Mikan, pro and DePaul basketball player
- George Mikan, Hall of Fame basketball center, DePaul and five-time NBA champion Minneapolis Lakers
- Stan Mikita, 22-year player for Chicago Blackhawks, member of Hockey Hall of Fame (born in Canada)
- Abner Mikva, judge, politician (Democrat), U.S. representative, White House counsel to Bill Clinton
- Darius Miles, forward for four NBA teams
- Gina Miles, singer, winner of The Voice season 23
- Penelope Milford, Oscar-nominated actress, Coming Home
- Adam Miller, basketball player
- Bob Miller, pitched in MLB at 17
- Bob Miller, broadcaster in Hockey Hall of Fame
- Bobby Miller, MLB pitcher
- Jack Miller, 12-year U.S. senator of Iowa
- Jesse Miller, musician
- Mary Miller, U.S. representative
- Otis L. Miller, MLB infielder 1927–32
- Patrick Miller, American player in Israeli Basketball Premier League
- Red Miller, head coach of Denver Broncos 1977–80
- Ron Miller, songwriter, "For Once in My Life"
- Steve Miller, track coach, athletic director, Nike executive, PBA director
- Terry Miller, NFL linebacker 1970–74
- Ward Miller, MLB outfielder 1909–17
- James Millhollin, character actor
- Wally Millies, MLB catcher 1934–41
- Robert Andrews Millikan, experimental physicist and Nobel laureate
- Isaac Lawrence Milliken, blacksmith, alderman, Mayor of Chicago 1854–55 (born in Maine)
- Donna Mills, actress, Knots Landing, Play Misty for Me
- Douglas R. Mills, basketball player, coach and athletic director for University of Illinois
- Phoebe Mills, gymnast, 1988 Olympic bronze medalist
- Sherrill Milnes, opera singer
- Bob Miner, co-founder of Oracle Corporation
- Steve Miner, film and TV director, Friday the 13th Part 2, Lake Placid, Day of the Dead
- Vincente Minnelli, Oscar-winning film director, An American in Paris, Gigi, The Band Wagon, Lust for Life, The Bad and the Beautiful, Father of the Bride, Some Came Running
- Minnie Miñoso, Hall of Fame outfielder, batted for White Sox in 1950s–1980s (born in Cuba)
- Martha Minow, dean of Harvard Law School
- Bob Mionske, attorney, Olympic and professional bicycle racer
- Chad Mirkin, professor, Northwestern
- Pat Misch, MLB pitcher 2006–11
- Jacquelyn Mitchard, author, The Deep End of the Ocean
- Joan Mitchell, artist
- John Mitchell, labor leader
- John Francis Mitchell, president and COO of Motorola 1980–1995
- Johnny Mitchell, NFL tight end 1992–96
- Kel Mitchell, comedian and actor
- Nicole Mitchell, flautist (born in New York)
- Roscoe Mitchell, jazz saxophonist
- Matt Mitrione, mixed martial artist

Mo–Mt

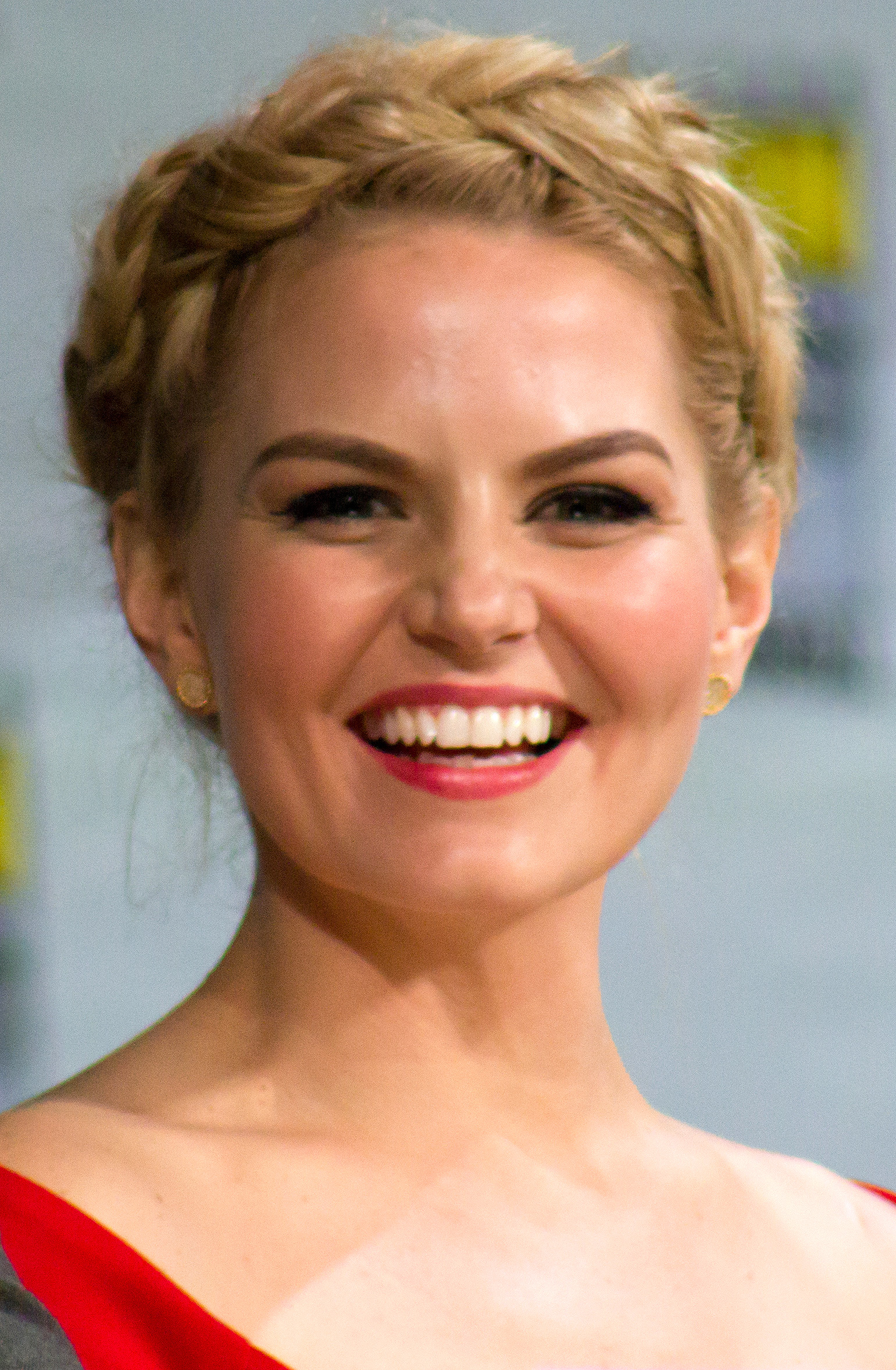
Jennifer Morrison

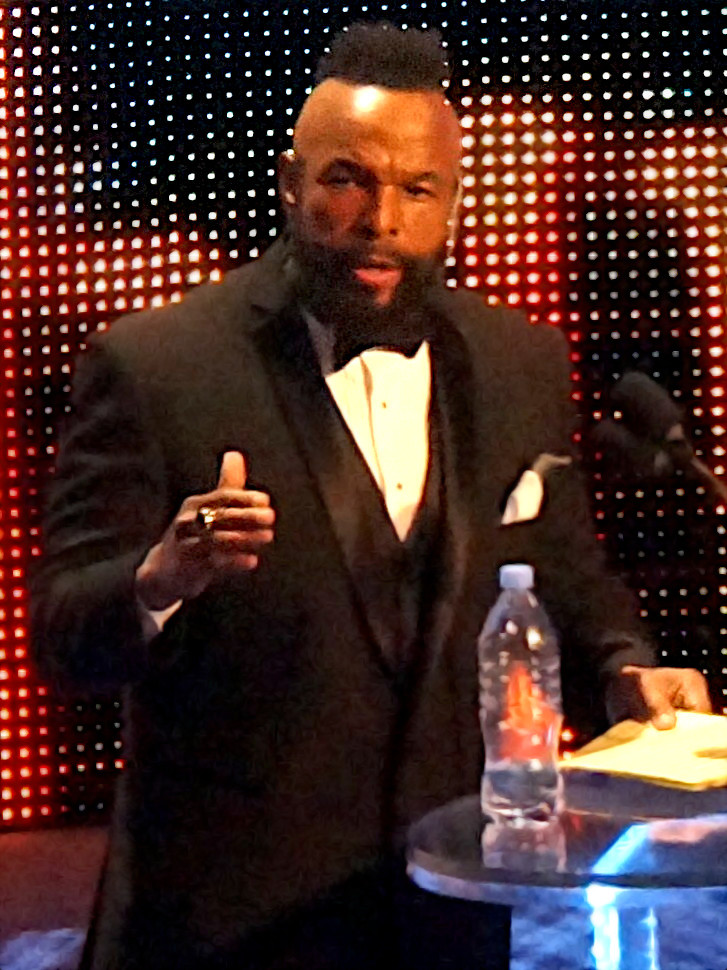
Mr. T

- Tony Moeaki, NFL tight end 2010–16
- Joe Moeller, MLB pitcher and scout
- Doug Moench, comic book writer, Batman
- Alex Moffat, comedian, Saturday Night Live
- D. W. Moffett, actor, Switched at Birth, For Your Love, Friday Night Lights
- Nazr Mohammed, center for eight NBA teams
- Kid Mohler, baseball player, Pacific Coast League Hall of Fame
- Laszlo Moholy-Nagy, artist, founder of IIT Institute of Design (born in Hungary)
- John Moisant, early 20th-century aviator
- Bo Molenda, NFL player and coach
- Jim Molinari, basketball head coach at Western Illinois, Bradley, Northern Illinois and Minnesota
- David Molk, NFL center 2012–15
- Jeff Monken, football coach, Army
- Harriet Monroe, poet
- Meredith Monroe, actress, Dawson's Creek, Criminal Minds
- Zach Monroe, pitcher for 1958 World Series champion New York Yankees
- Eric Monte, creator of TV series Good Times
- Megan Montefusco, pro soccer player
- Kahmari Montgomery, sprinter
- Karen Montgomery, actress, producer
- Dwight L. Moody, evangelical minister, publisher, established Moody Bible Institute (born in Massachusetts)
- William Vaughn Moody, dramatist and poet (born in Indiana)
- Thomas Mooney, imprisoned labor leader
- Hank Moonjean, film producer, Sharky's Machine, Dangerous Liaisons
- Allen F. Moore, U.S. representative 1921–25
- Annabelle Moore, dancer, silent film actress
- Ben Moore, player in Israeli Basketball Premier League
- Charles R. Moore, actor
- Christina Moore, actress, Hawthorne, Hyperion Bay, Hot Properties
- Clayton Moore, actor, The Lone Ranger
- Dayton Moore, baseball executive (born in Kansas)
- D. J. Moore, NFL defensive back 2009–14
- Dolores Moore, pro baseball player
- Eleanor Moore, pro baseball player
- Graham Moore, Oscar-winning screenwriter, The Imitation Game
- Irving J. Moore, television director
- Jesse Hale Moore, Civil War general, U.S. representative
- John Moore, NHL defenseman
- John Moore, lieutenant governor 1842–46, Mexican–American War officer (born in England)
- Margo Moore, actress, fashion model
- Richard Moore, cinematographer, co-creator of Panavision
- Stephen Moore, economic writer, policy analyst
- Tim Moore, actor and comedian, Amos 'n' Andy
- Emery Moorehead, tight end for Super Bowl XX champion Chicago Bears
- Dick Moores, cartoonist
- Pablo Morales, swimmer, 1984 and 1992 Olympic golds, Nebraska coach
- Bugs Moran, gangster, rival of Al Capone
- Jackie Moran, actor, The Adventures of Tom Sawyer, Buck Rogers
- Jim Moran, automobile mogul, philanthropist
- Lee Moran, actor, director, screenwriter
- Polly Moran, actress, Caught Short, Alice in Wonderland
- Terry Moran, correspondent for ABC News
- Tom Morello, guitarist for Rage Against the Machine
- Anna Morgan, drama teacher (born in New York)
- Cindy Morgan, actress, Caddyshack, Tron
- Ed Morgan, infielder for Cleveland Indians 1928–33
- Helen Morgan, singer, portrayed in biopic The Helen Morgan Story
- Read Morgan, actor, The Deputy
- Trevor Morgan, actor, The Sixth Sense, Jurassic Park III, The Patriot
- Big Bill Morganfield, blues singer and guitarist
- George Moriarty, MLB player, manager and umpire
- Audrey Morris, jazz singer
- Buckner Stith Morris, Mayor of Chicago 1838–39 (born in Kentucky)
- Jeannie Morris, sports journalist (born in California)
- Johnny Morris, receiver for Chicago Bears, sportscaster (born in California)
- Lamorne Morris, actor, New Girl
- Max Morris, basketball and football All-American for Northwestern
- Sandi Morris, pole vaulter, 2016 Olympics silver medalist
- Allie Morrison, freestyle wrestler, 1928 Olympic gold medalist (born in Iowa)
- David Morrison, astrophysicist
- James L. D. Morrison, Mexican War officer, U.S. representative 1856–57
- Jennifer Morrison, actress, model, House, How I Met Your Mother, Star Trek, Once Upon a Time
- Karen Morrison-Comstock, 1974 Miss USA
- William Ralls Morrison, Civil War officer, U.S. representative
- Larry Morrissey, mayor of Rockford 2005–17
- Byron Morrow, actor, Executive Suite
- Karen Morrow, singer
- William Morrow, screenwriter
- Lee Mortimer, journalist and author
- Amy Morton, actress, Up in the Air, Chicago P.D.
- Charles Morton, actor
- Jelly Roll Morton, jazz pianist (born in Louisiana)
- Joy Morton, founder of Morton Salt company and Morton Arboretum
- Lorraine H. Morton, first African-American mayor of Evanston
- John Mosca, restaurateur in Louisiana
- Margaret Moser, music journalist
- Porter Moser, basketball coach, Illinois State, Loyola, Oklahoma
- Beth Moses, commercial astronaut
- Mark Moses, actor, Desperate Housewives, Grand, Mad Men
- Senta Moses, actress, General Hospital, Running the Halls, Home Alone
- Peter Moskos, assistant professor at John Jay College of Criminal Justice
- Stewart Moss, actor, writer and director
- Burton C. Mossman, cattleman and lawman
- Johnny Mostil, outfielder for White Sox, two-time AL stolen-base leader
- Willard Motley, columnist and author
- Ben Roy Mottelson, physicist, 1975 Nobel Prize
- Markos Moulitsas, founder of liberal blog Daily Kos, columnist
- Samuel W. Moulton, lawyer, U.S. representative (born in Massachusetts)
- Anson Mount, actor, Hell on Wheels, Non-Stop, Star Trek: Strange New Worlds
- Edgar Ansel Mowrer, foreign correspondent and author
- Paul Scott Mowrer, war correspondent and editor
- John Moyer, lineman for arena football's Chicago Rush
- Mr. T, actor, Rocky III, The A-Team

Mu–Mz

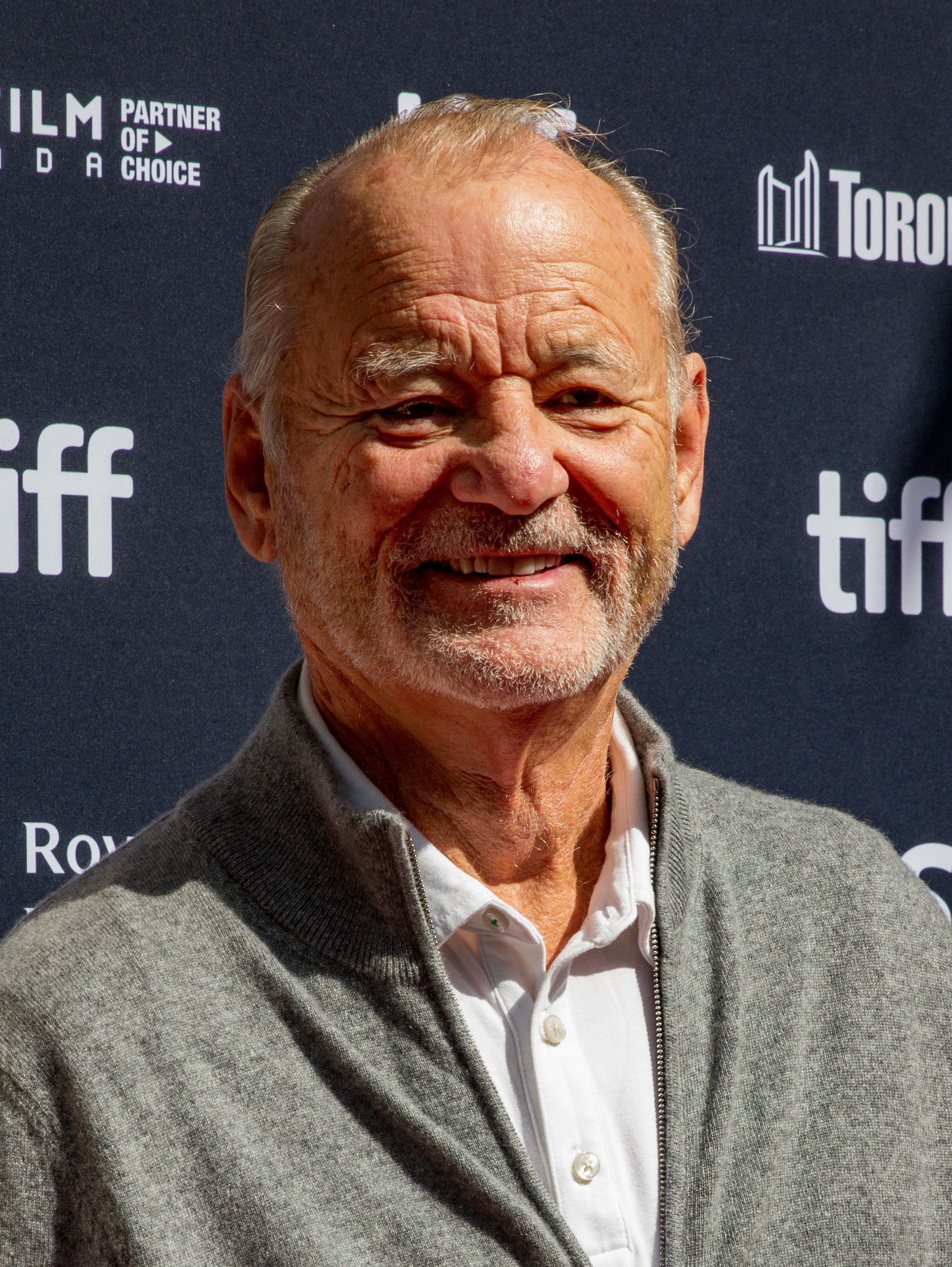
Bill Murray

- Jerry Muckensturm, linebacker for Chicago Bears 1976–83
- Jessie Mueller, singer and actress, Tony Award winner
- Earl Muetterties, inorganic chemist
- Jabir Herbert Muhammad, Nation of Islam official, manager of Muhammad Ali (born in Michigan)
- Gavin Muir, actor
- John Mulaney, stand-up comedian, Saturday Night Live writer, producer, host
- Mark Mulder, pitcher for Oakland Athletics and St. Louis Cardinals
- Clarence E. Mulford, creator of Hopalong Cassidy
- David Mulford, U.S. ambassador to India 2004–09
- Martin Mull, actor, Fernwood 2 Night, Mr. Mom, Clue, Serial, Roseanne, Dads
- Vern Mullen, NFL halfback 1923–27
- Bill Mulliken, swimming gold medalist, 1960 Olympics
- Bryan Mullins, basketball player and head coach for Southern Illinois
- George Mundelein, cardinal and archbishop of Chicago (born in New York)
- Madman Muntz, car-stereo pioneer
- Edgar Munzel, baseball writer
- Ira Murchison, sprinter, 1956 Summer Olympics relay gold
- Ben Murphy, actor, Alias Smith and Jones, Winds of War (born in Arkansas)
- Charles Murphy, owner of Chicago Cubs 1906–13
- David Lee Murphy, country music artist
- Dick Murphy, mayor of San Diego 2000–05
- John Murphy, swimmer, gold medalist at 1972 Summer Olympics
- John Benjamin Murphy, surgeon and innovator (born in Wisconsin)
- Kelly Murphy, volleyball player
- Thomas Joseph Murphy, archbishop of Seattle 1990–97
- Bill Murray, comedian and Oscar-nominated actor, Saturday Night Live, the Ghostbusters movies, Stripes, Tootsie, Caddyshack, Groundhog Day, Scrooged, Lost in Translation, St. Vincent
- Brian Doyle-Murray, actor, voice artist, Saturday Night Live, Marvelous Misadventures of Flapjack, The Razor's Edge, Wayne's World
- Elizabeth Murray, artist
- Joel Murray, actor, Dharma & Greg, Love & War, Grand, Mad Men
- John Murray, music teacher, founder of Naperville, Illinois
- Brent Musburger, sportscaster, Northwestern alumnus, 1960s Chicago sportswriter (born in Oregon)
- Todd Musburger, talent agent
- John Musker, animation director, Aladdin, Hercules, The Princess and the Frog
- George Musso, Hall of Fame lineman for Chicago Bears
- Max Mutchnick, TV producer, creator of Will & Grace
- Riccardo Muti, Chicago symphony conductor 2008–23 (born in Italy)
- Mike Myers, MLB pitcher 1995–2007
- Don Myrick, saxophonist for Earth, Wind & Fire, Phil Collins

== N ==
Na–Nn

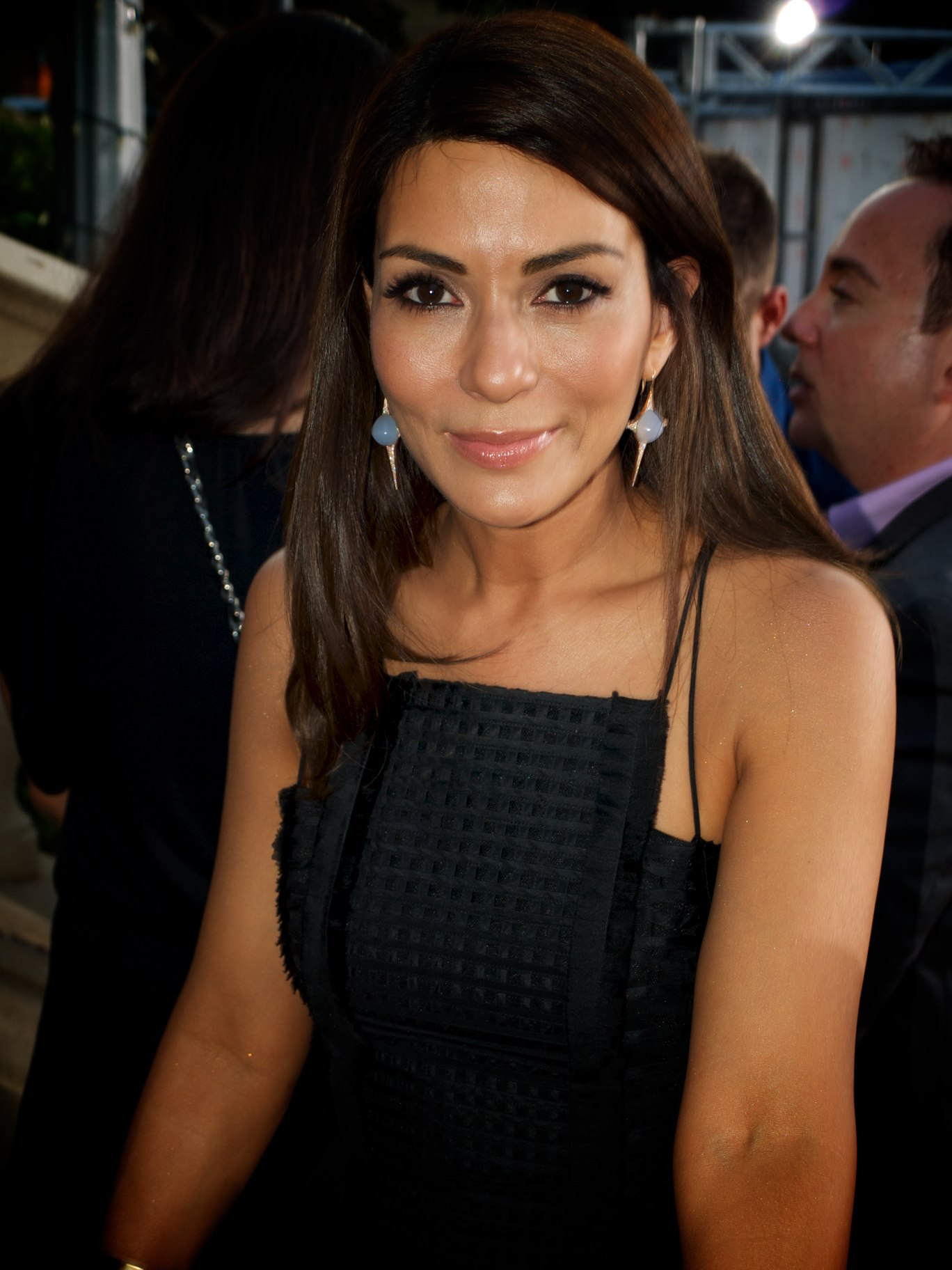
Marisol Nichols

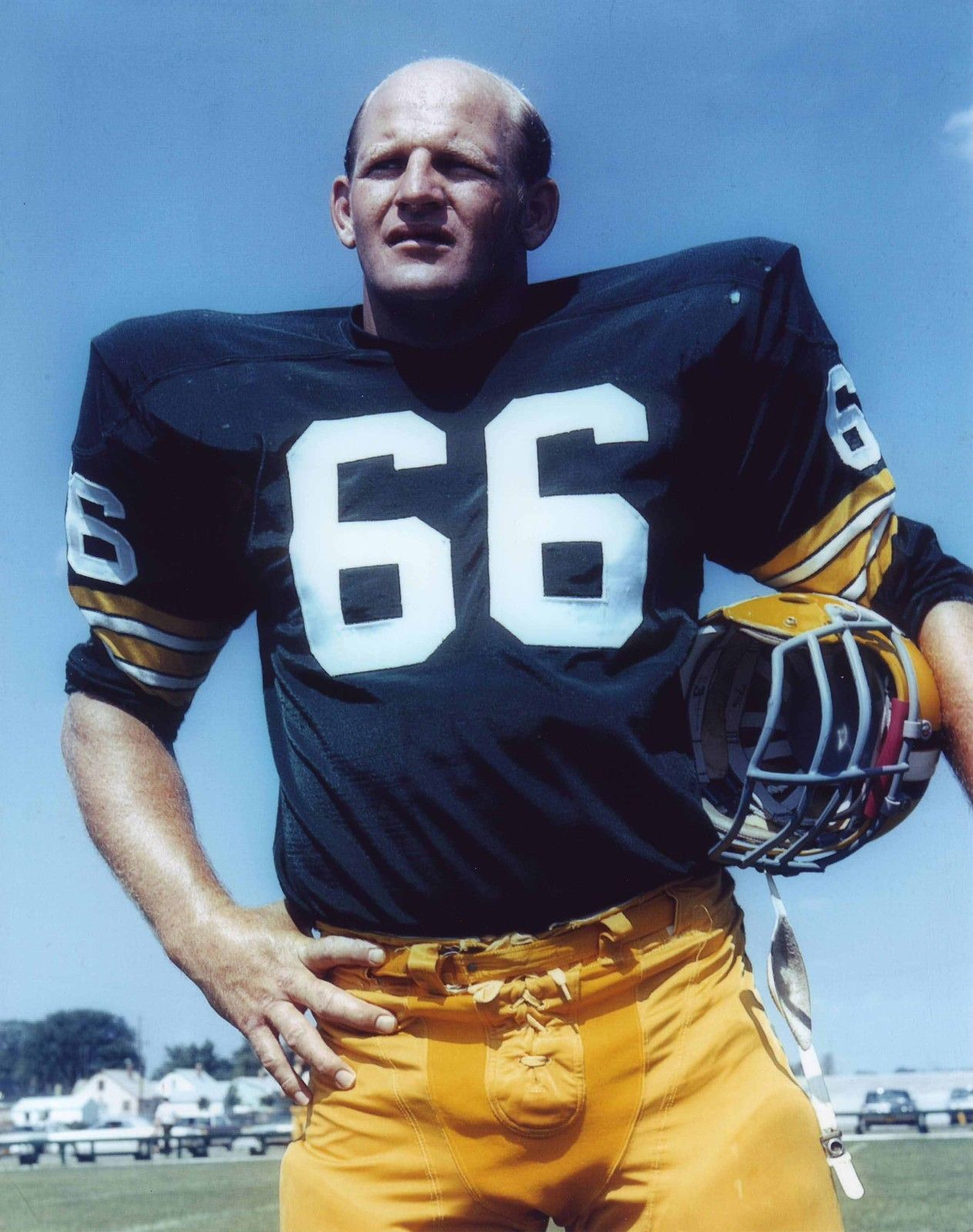
Ray Nitschke

- John Naber, swimmer, winner of five Olympic medals
- Bill Nack, author and journalist
- Abdel Nader, forward, Northern Illinois and NBA (born in Egypt)
- Steven R. Nagel, astronaut
- Jack Nagle, basketball coach for Marquette 1953–58
- Ajay Naidu, actor, Office Space, LateLine
- Suzy Nakamura, actress, The 40-Year-Old Virgin, Dr. Ken
- Duke Nalon, auto racer in Motorsports Hall of Fame of America
- Bryan Namoff, pro soccer player (born in Nevada)
- Albinus Nance, governor of Nebraska 1879–1883
- Ray Nance, trumpeter
- Joseph Naper, shipbuilder, first village president of Naperville
- Bob Nardella, hockey player, coach of Chicago Wolves
- Robert Nardelli, CEO, Chrysler, Home Depot (born in Pennsylvania)
- Charles W. Nash, automobile entrepreneur, created Nash Motors
- Heather Nauert, anchor for Fox News Channel
- Tom Neal, actor, Detour, Crime, Inc.
- Long John Nebel, radio personality
- Oscar Neebe, convicted Haymarket affair anarchist (born in New York)
- Carrie Neely, four-time U.S. Open tennis doubles champion
- Cal Neeman, MLB catcher 1957–63
- John G. Neihardt, author and historian
- A.L. Neiman, co-founder of Neiman Marcus
- Bernie Neis, MLB player 1920–27
- Baby Face Nelson, bank robber and murderer in 1930s
- Battling Nelson, boxer, lightweight champion 1905–06 (born in Denmark)
- Don Nelson, NBA player and coach in Basketball Hall of Fame (born in Michigan)
- John Nelson, swimmer, 1964 and 1968 Olympic medalist
- Karl Nelson, lineman for Super Bowl XXI champion New York Giants
- Michael J. Nelson, comedian and writer, Mystery Science Theater 3000
- Wayne Nelson, musician from classic rock's Little River Band
- Eliot Ness, treasury agent, chief investigator of Prohibition Bureau, subject of film and TV series The Untouchables
- Dawn Clark Netsch, state senator, comptroller, gubernatorial candidate
- Lois Nettleton, 1948 Miss Illinois, Emmy-winning actress, The Twilight Zone, Come Fly with Me, Period of Adjustment
- Jerry Neudecker, baseball umpire
- Harry Neumann, cinematographer
- P. Scott Neville Jr., judge, Supreme Court of Illinois
- Allan Nevins, historian and 1933 Pulitzer Prize-winning biographer
- Arthur S. Nevins, U.S. Army general, friend of Dwight Eisenhower
- Walter C. Newberry, Civil War officer, Chicago postmaster, U.S. representative (born in New York)
- Walter Loomis Newberry, president of Chicago Board of Education, philanthropist, created Newberry Library
- New Colony Six, rock band from Chicago
- Francis K. Newcomer, general, Panama Canal Zone governor 1948–52
- Bob Newhart, Emmy and Grammy-winning comedian, actor, The Bob Newhart Show, Newhart, Catch-22, In & Out, Elf
- Joe Newton, cross country coach, 28 state championships
- Kim Ng, MLB executive (born in Indiana)
- Alberta Nichols, songwriter
- Marisol Nichols, actress, Riverdale, Resurrection Blvd., 24, Blind Justice
- Mike Nichols, Oscar and Tony-winning film and stage director, alumnus of University of Chicago and Second City (born in Russia)
- Nichelle Nichols, actress, Nyota Uhura on Star Trek
- Danell Nicholson, heavyweight boxer
- Seth Barnes Nicholson, astronomer
- Carl Nicks, NBA guard 1980–83, played for 1979 NCAA runner-up Indiana State
- John George Nicolay, secretary to Abe Lincoln (born in Germany)
- Arthur Nielsen, founder of Nielsen Company, television ratings
- Rick Nielsen, musician, Cheap Trick
- Ben Niemann, NFL linebacker, Super Bowl LIV champion Kansas City Chiefs (born in Iowa)
- Audrey Niffenegger, author, The Time Traveler's Wife
- Alexa Nikolas, actress, Zoey 101, Hidden Hills
- Rob Ninkovich, NFL linebacker 2006–16, two-time Super Bowl champion with New England Patriots
- Ray Nitschke, Hall of Fame linebacker for Green Bay Packers, five-time NFL champion
- Frank Nitti, gangster, associate of Al Capone (born in Italy)
- Jack Nitzsche, Oscar-winning songwriter, "Up Where We Belong"
- Agnes Nixon, creator of All My Children
- Ogonna Nnamani, volleyball player, two-time Olympian

No–Nz

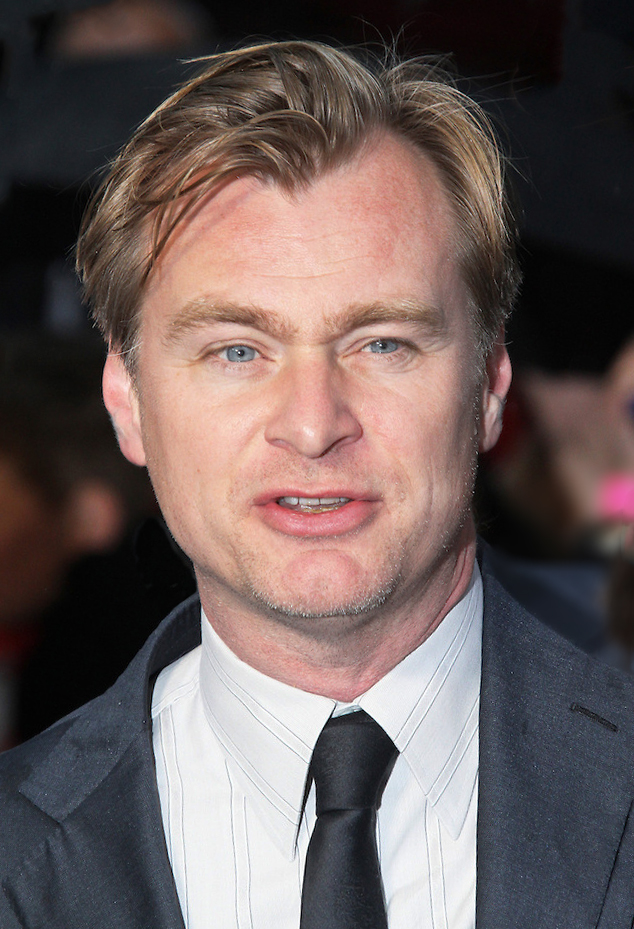
Christopher Nolan

- Natalia Nogulich, actress, Star Trek: The Next Generation
- Christopher Nolan, director, Batman Begins, The Dark Knight, Oppenheimer (born in England)
- Jonathan Nolan, screenwriter, The Dark Knight Rises, Interstellar, Westworld (born in England)
- George Nolfi, screenwriter, The Bourne Ultimatum, Ocean's Twelve
- Ken Nordine, voice-over artist (born in Iowa)
- Nelson Norgren, four-sport athlete, 34-year University of Chicago coach
- Ken Norman, player for three NBA teams
- Bruce Norris, owner of NHL's Detroit Red Wings 1952–82
- James D. Norris, chairman of Chicago Blackhawks, member of Hockey Hall of Fame
- James E. Norris, miller, part-owner of Chicago Stadium and NHL teams (born in Canada)
- Frank Norris, novelist
- Lou North, MLB pitcher 1913–24
- Cliff Norton, actor
- Ken Norton, heavyweight boxer and actor, Mandingo
- Ken Norton Jr., NFL linebacker and coach
- Red Norvo, xylophone and vibraphone musician
- Kim Novak, Golden Globe-winning actress, Vertigo, Picnic, Pal Joey, Bell, Book and Candle, Kiss Me, Stupid
- Larry Novak, musical director at Mister Kelly's
- Robert Novak, syndicated columnist, TV personality, author, conservative political commentator
- Steve Novak, NBA forward 2006–17
- Jay Novello, actor
- Brent Novoselsky, tight end for Minnesota Vikings 1988–94
- Christopher Nowinski, author, former WWE professional wrestler
- Ted Nugent, rock musician (born in Michigan)
- Kendrick Nunn, NBA guard
- Mike Nussbaum, actor, Men in Black, Things Change
- Russell Nype, Broadway actor and Tony Award winner
- David Nyvall, theologian, first president of North Park University (born in Sweden)

== O ==
Oa–Ok

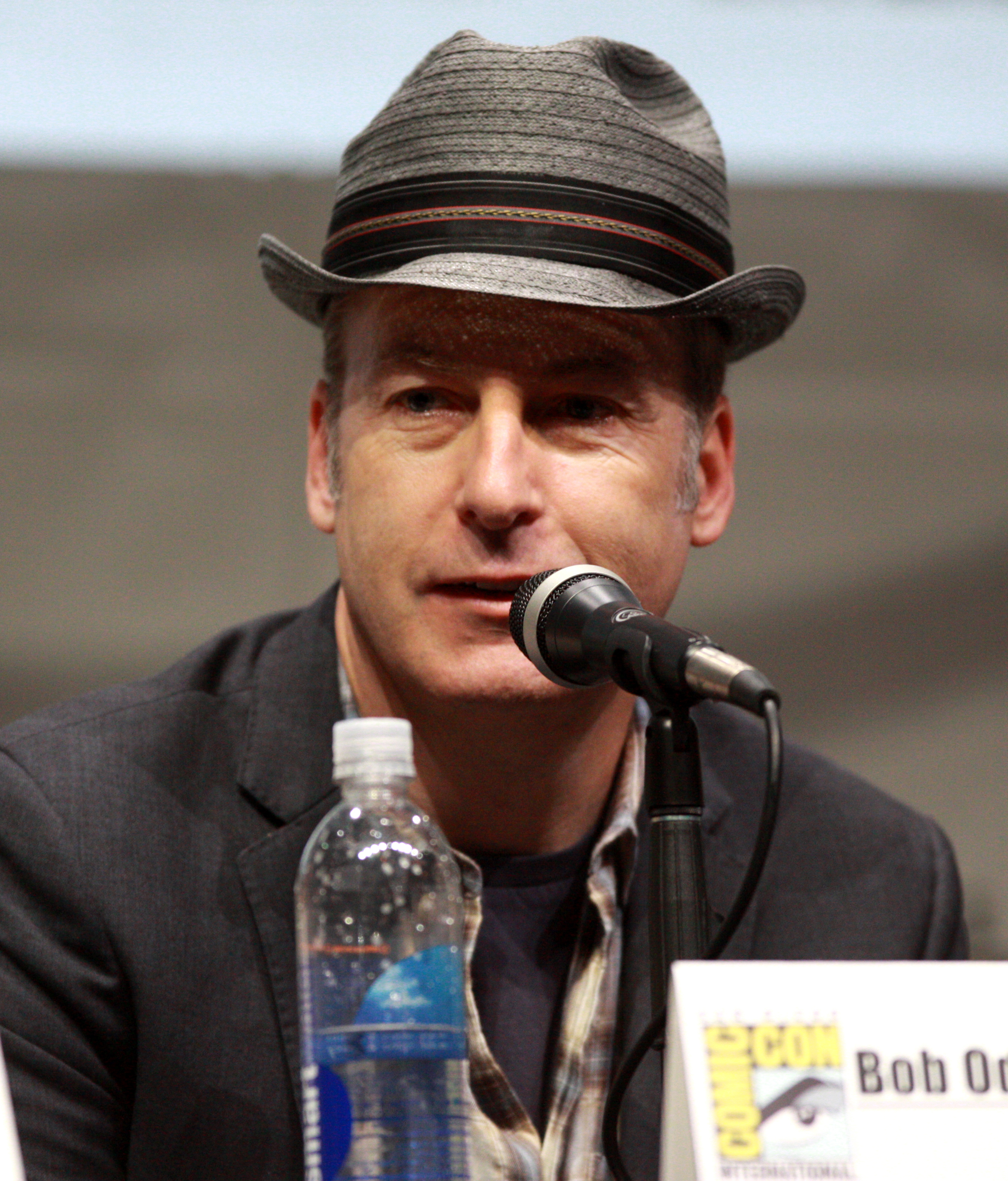
Bob Odenkirk

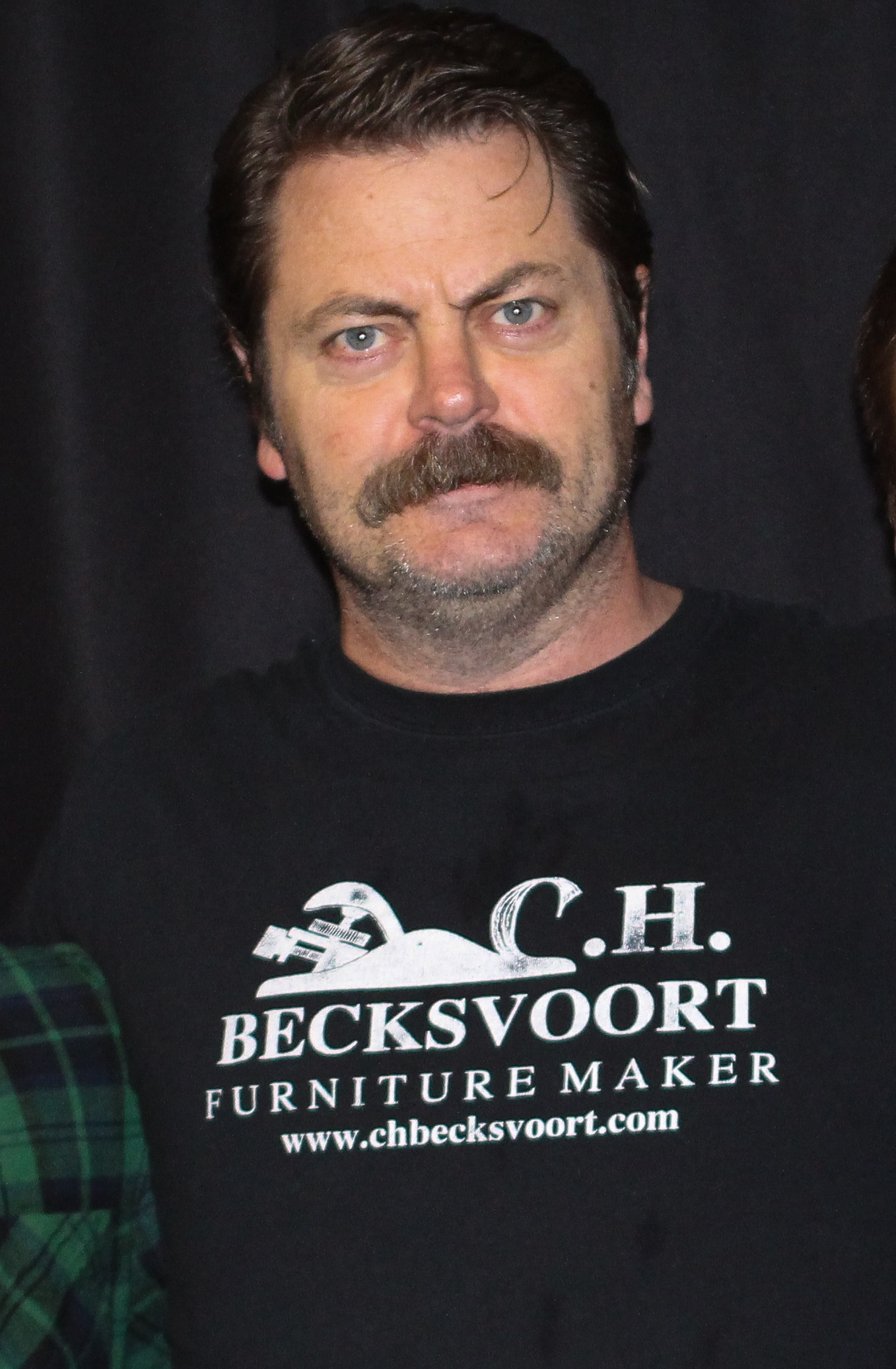
Nick Offerman

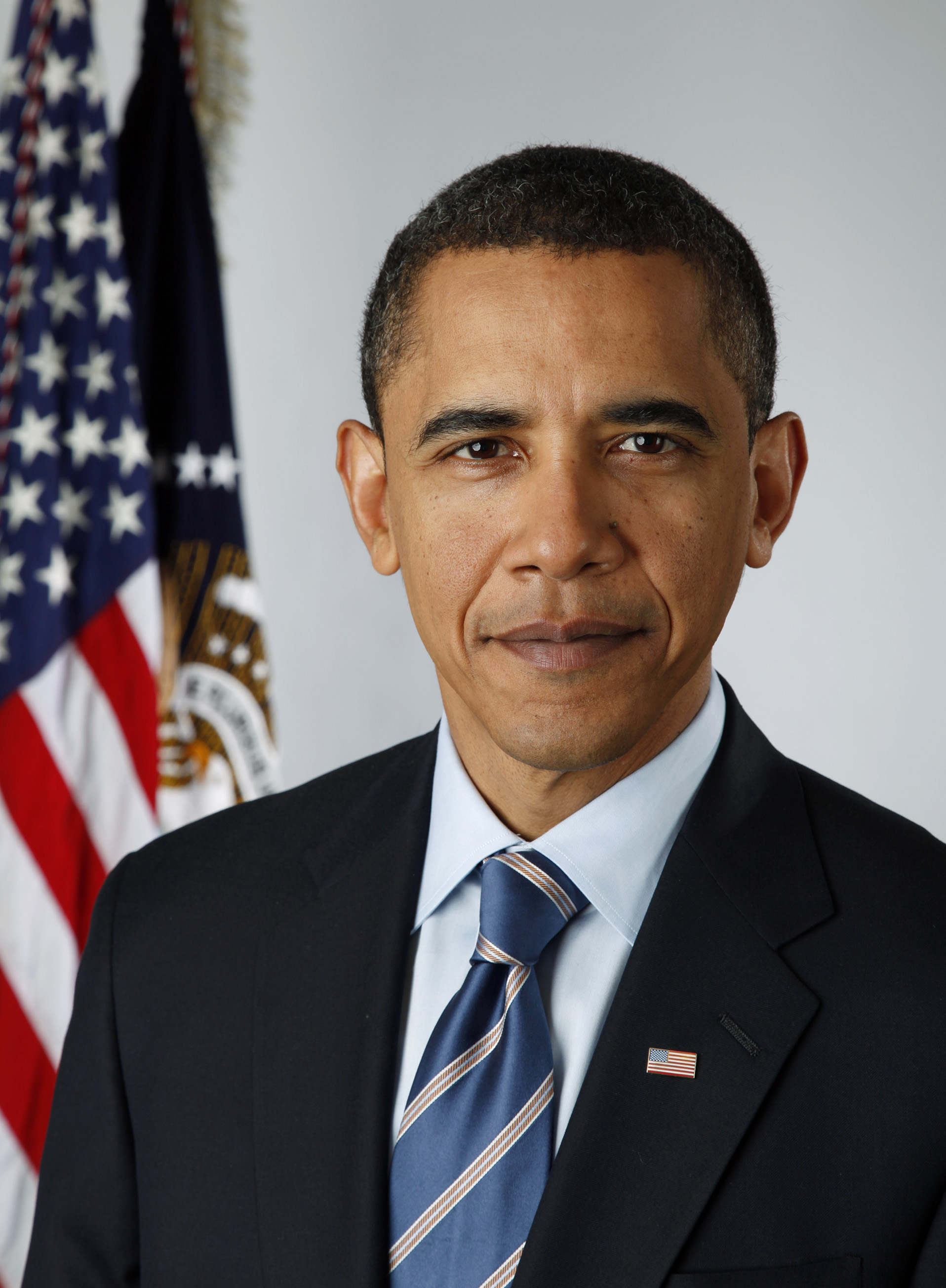
Barack Obama

- Berry Oakley, musician with The Allman Brothers Band
- Barack Obama, 44th president of the United States; former U.S. senator from Illinois (2004–2008) (born in Hawaii)
- Michelle Obama, attorney, author, First Lady of the United States 2009–17, wife of Barack Obama
- Dean O'Banion, organized crime figure
- Ken Oberkfell, MLB infielder 1977–92, played for 1982 World Series champion St. Louis Cardinals
- Jim Oberweis, dairy owner, politician
- Arch Oboler, playwright, radio personality, film director
- Ed O'Bradovich, defensive end for 1963 NFL champion Chicago Bears
- Hugh O'Brian, actor, The Life and Legend of Wyatt Earp, Ten Little Indians, Come Fly With Me, The Shootist
- Chris O'Brien, pro football pioneer, owner of Chicago Cardinals
- George M. O'Brien, U.S. representative 1973–86
- Mary K. O'Brien, judge
- Thomas J. O'Brien, 24-year U.S. representative
- Jack O'Callahan, hockey player for Chicago Blackhawks and in 1980 "Miracle on Ice" game
- Bob Ociepka, basketball coach
- Mike O'Connell, NHL player and executive
- Tommy O'Connell, quarterback, Cleveland Browns, 1957 NFL title game
- Colleen O'Connor, ice dancer, three-time U.S. champion, Olympic bronze
- Donald O'Connor, actor, dancer, Singin' in the Rain, There's No Business Like Show Business, Francis
- Kevin J. O'Connor, actor, Color of Night, The Mummy, There Will Be Blood
- Leslie O'Connor, baseball executive
- Tim O'Connor, actor, Peyton Place, Buck Rogers in the 25th Century
- Tommy O'Connor, gangster (born in Ireland)
- Anita O'Day, singer
- Hank O'Day, Baseball Hall of Fame umpire
- Rasmea Odeh, convicted of immigration fraud, imprisoned for terrorist bombing
- Bill Odenkirk, comedy writer, actor, producer, Mr. Show, The Simpsons
- Bob Odenkirk, actor, comedian, writer, director, Better Call Saul, Breaking Bad, Nebraska, Mr. Show, Fargo
- Chris O'Donnell, actor, NCIS: Los Angeles, Scent of a Woman, Batman Forever, Batman & Robin
- Jake Odorizzi, MLB pitcher
- Matt O'Dwyer, NFL offensive lineman 1995–2004
- Joe Oeschger, MLB pitcher 1915–24
- Bob O'Farrell, catcher for three MLB teams, 1926 MVP and World Series champion, manager
- Nick Offerman, Emmy-winning actor, comedian, Parks and Recreation, The Lego Movie, We're the Millers
- William Butler Ogden, politician (Democrat), first Mayor of Chicago (born in New York)
- Joseph Ogle, Revolutionary War soldier, established state's first Methodist church (born in Maryland)
- Richard James Oglesby, politician (Republican), Civil War officer, U.S. senator, three-time governor of Illinois (born in Kentucky)
- Richard B. Ogilvie, lawyer, Cook County Sheriff 1962–66, governor of Illinois 1969–73 (born in Missouri)
- Gail O'Grady, actress, American Dreams, NYPD Blue, Hellcats
- David Ogrin, pro golfer
- Tom O'Halleran, U.S. representative in Arizona 2017–23
- Barratt O'Hara, lieutenant governor, U.S. representative 1949–69
- Janice O'Hara, pro baseball player
- Edward J. O'Hare, lawyer, associate of Al Capone, father of war hero Butch O'Hare (for whom O'Hare Airport was named)
- Michael O'Hare, actor, Babylon 5
- Don Ohl, five-time All-Star for three NBA teams
- Don Ohlmeyer, Emmy and Peabody Award-winning television producer, Monday Night Football, Saturday Night Live
- Jahlil Okafor, basketball player for Duke and Philadelphia 76ers, third pick of 2015 NBA draft
- Georgia O'Keeffe, artist, Art Institute of Chicago student (born in Wisconsin)

Ol–Oz

- Douglas R. Oberhelman, CEO of Caterpillar Inc.
- Porsha Olayiwola, Boston poet laureate
- Ed Olczyk, player for six NHL teams, coach, TV commentator
- Arne Oldberg, composer, Northwestern professor
- Claes Oldenburg, sculptor (born in Sweden)
- Brian Oldfield, shot putter
- Jawann Oldham, center for eight NBA teams
- Catherine O'Leary, said to be indirectly responsible for Great Chicago Fire
- Charley O'Leary, oldest MLB player (58) ever to bat
- Matt O'Leary, actor
- John M. Olin, owner of 1974 Kentucky Derby winner Cannonade
- Ken Olin, actor, director, Thirtysomething, Brothers & Sisters
- Gene Oliver, catcher for five MLB teams
- Guy Oliver, silent-film actor
- King Oliver, jazz musician (born in Louisiana)
- Martha Capps Oliver, poet, hymnwriter
- Gertrude Olmstead, silent-film actress
- James Olson, actor, The Andromeda Strain, Rachel, Rachel, Ragtime
- Francis O'Neill, Chicago chief of police 1901–05 (born in Ireland)
- Kyle Onstott, author, Mandingo
- Jerry Orbach, film, TV and Tony-winning stage actor, Law & Order, Prince of the City, Dirty Dancing, Beauty and the Beast
- Dick Orkin, radio personality
- Suze Orman, author, financial advisor, television commentator
- Red Ormsby, Major League Baseball umpire 1923–41
- Jim O'Rourke, musician, Sonic Youth
- Carey Orr, cartoonist
- David Orr, alderman, Cook County clerk, briefly Mayor of Chicago
- Johnny Orr, basketball coach, Michigan and Iowa State
- Warren H. Orr, judge (born in Missouri)
- Zak Orth, actor, Revolution
- Kid Ory, musician and bandleader (born in Louisiana)
- Harold Osborn, gold medalist in decathlon and high jump at 1924 Summer Olympics
- James O'Shaughnessy, NFL and Illinois State tight end
- Dan Osinski, MLB pitcher 1962–70
- Wally Osterkorn, pro basketball player
- Fritz Ostermueller, MLB pitcher 1934–48
- Johnny Ostrowski, MLB player for Cubs and White Sox
- Jim O'Toole, MLB pitcher 1958–67
- Dave Otto, MLB pitcher 1987–94, sportscaster
- Diana Oughton, student activist, member of The Weathermen
- Antoine Ouilmette, early settler, Wilmette namesake (born in Canada)
- Harold Ousley, jazz musician
- David K. Overstreet, judge
- Michael Ovitz, co-founder of Creative Artists Agency, president of Walt Disney Company 1995–97
- Ruth Bryan Owen, first female in Florida elected to U.S. Congress; ambassador to Denmark and Iceland
- Brick Owens, MLB umpire 1908–37 (born in Wisconsin)
- Mel Owens, NFL linebacker 1981–89 (born in Michigan)
- Joseph W. Ozbourn, decorated World War II soldier
- Marite Ozers, 1963 Miss USA (born in Latvia)
- Ray Ozzie, executive with Microsoft, Hewlett-Packard

== P ==
Pa–Pd

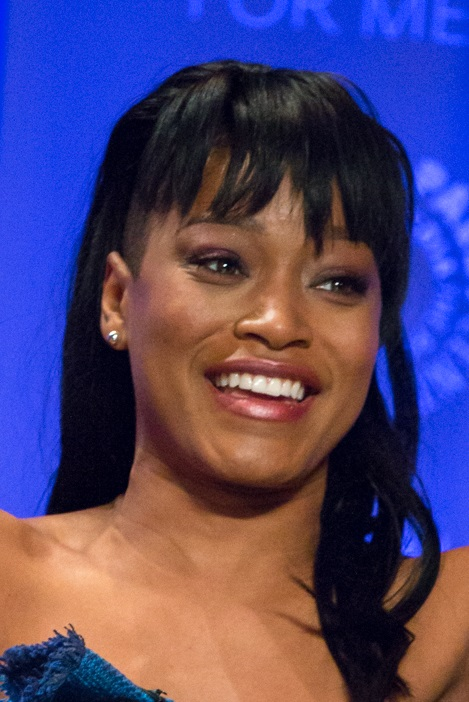
Keke Palmer

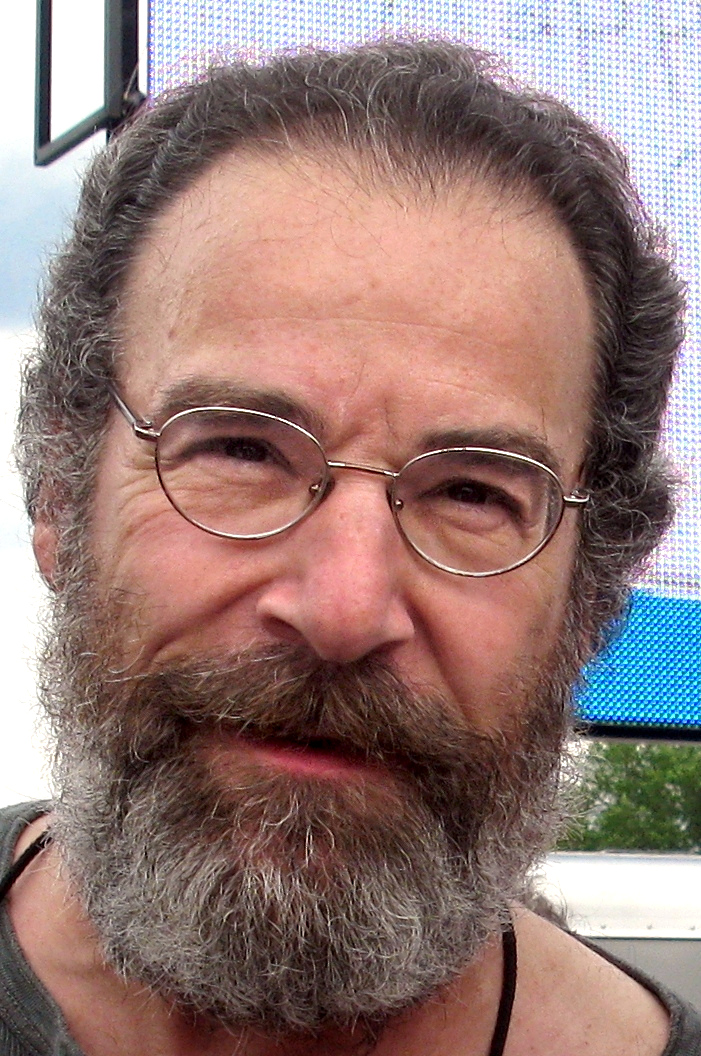
Mandy Patinkin

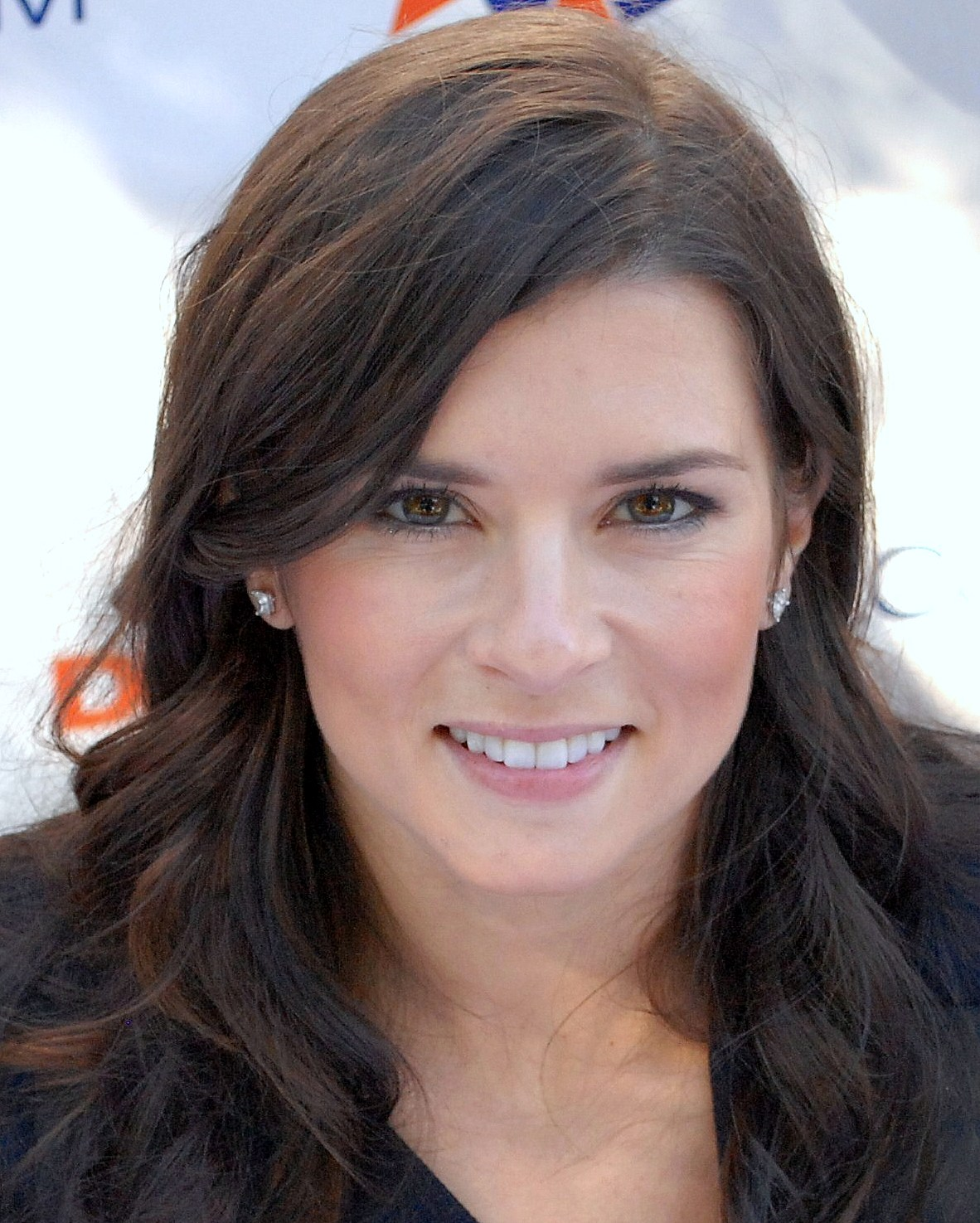
Danica Patrick

- Cliff Padgett, motorboat builder, hydroplane racer
- Walter Paepcke, philanthropist, founder of Aspen Institute
- Priscilla Paetsch, violinist
- Geraldine Page, Oscar-winning actress, The Trip to Bountiful, Hondo, Sweet Bird of Youth (born in Missouri)
- Harlan Page, two-sport star for University of Chicago, head coach of Butler basketball, Indiana football
- Kimberly Page, professional wrestling personality
- Ruth Page, ballerina, Chicago patron of the arts (born in Indiana)
- Deborah Pratt, actress, writer, producer, director
- Jean Paige, silent-film actress
- Eleazar A. Paine, lawyer, controversial Civil War officer (born in Ohio)
- Norman C. Paine, football coach, Baylor, Arkansas and Iowa State
- Curtis Painter, NFL quarterback 2009–14
- Ho-Sung Pak, actor, martial artist, action choreographer
- Max Palevsky, philanthropist, computer technology pioneer
- William S. Paley, broadcasting pioneer, chief executive of CBS
- Donn Pall, MLB pitcher 1988–98
- Ashley Palmer, actress, singer, Paranormal Activity
- Bee Palmer, singer, "Please Don't Talk About Me When I'm Gone"
- Bertha Palmer, philanthropist (born in Kentucky)
- Betsy Palmer, actress and TV personality, Mister Roberts, The Tin Star, I've Got a Secret, Friday the 13th (born in Indiana)
- John M. Palmer, politician (Democrat, Republican, Free Soil), Civil War general, U.S. senator 1891–97, governor of Illinois 1869–73 (born in Kentucky)
- John McAuley Palmer, World War II general
- Keke Palmer, Emmy-winning actress, singer, Madea's Family Reunion, Joyful Noise, Hustlers, Nope
- Peter Palmer, singer, athlete, actor, Li'l Abner (born in Wisconsin)
- Phoebe Palmer, evangelist and author (born in New York)
- Potter Palmer, land developer, Palmer House founder (born in New York)
- Shirley Palmer, actress
- Danielle Panabaker, actress, Shark, Empire Falls, Friday the 13th, The Flash (born in Georgia)
- Kay Panabaker, actress, Summerland, Phil of the Future (born in Texas)
- Norman Panama, screenwriter, director, White Christmas, Road to Utopia, Mr. Blandings Builds His Dream House
- Ken Panfil, NFL lineman 1956–62
- James Pankow, musician, a founding member of rock band Chicago (born in Missouri)
- John Pankow, actor, To Live and Die in L.A., A Stranger Among Us, Episodes (born in Missouri)
- Chuck Panozzo, bass player for rock band Styx
- John Panozzo, drummer for rock band Styx
- George Papadopoulos, advisor to 2016 Donald Trump campaign
- Al Papai, MLB pitcher 1948–55
- Billy Papke, middleweight boxing champion, Hall of Fame
- Erik Pappas, MLB catcher
- Milt Pappas, MLB pitcher 1957–73, no-hitter for Chicago Cubs, managed Chicago Storm (born in Michigan)
- Thomas Paprocki, Catholic bishop of Springfield
- Walter Parazaider, musician with band Chicago
- Jimmy Pardo, comedian, actor
- Sara Paretsky, crime novelist (born in Iowa)
- Jannero Pargo, guard for six NBA teams
- Tiny Parham, pianist and bandleader (born in Canada)
- Jane Park, LPGA golfer
- Anthony Parker, guard for four NBA teams, 2004 Israeli Basketball Premier League MVP, executive with Orlando Magic
- Candace Parker, two-time NCAA champion, two-time Olympic gold medalist, three-time WNBA champion and twice MVP
- Eric Parker, wide receiver for San Diego Chargers 2002–07
- Francis W. Parker, education reformer (born in New Hampshire)
- Jabari Parker, basketball forward, four-time state champion with Simeon, second pick of 2014 NBA draft
- Salty Parker, MLB player, coach, manager
- Sonny Parker, guard for Golden State Warriors 1976–82
- Wes Parker, first baseman for Los Angeles Dodgers 1964–72
- Larry Parks, Oscar-nominated actor, The Jolson Story, Down to Earth, Jolson Sings Again, The Swordsman
- Ben Parr, journalist, author, venture capitalist
- Vernon Parrington, historian, 1928 Pulitzer Prize
- Steve Parris, MLB pitcher 1995–2003
- Terell Parks, player in Israeli Basketball Premier League
- Albert Parsons, editor, anarchist executed after Haymarket affair (born in Alabama)
- Claude V. Parsons, educator, U.S. representative 1930–41
- Louella Parsons, syndicated newspaper columnist
- Lucy Parsons, anarchist and labor organizer (born in Texas)
- Cecil A. Partee, president of state senate (born in Arkansas)
- Ed Paschke, artist
- Tony Pashos, NFL offensive tackle 2003–13
- Dave Pasquesi, actor
- Geeta Patel, director and screenwriter
- Ravi Patel, actor, Grandfathered
- Don Patinkin, Israeli-American economist, President of Hebrew University of Jerusalem
- Mandy Patinkin, Emmy-winning actor, The Princess Bride, Dick Tracy, Ragtime, Yentl, Chicago Hope, Homeland
- Sheldon Patinkin, theater director for Columbia College, Second City
- Danica Patrick, auto racer, best finish of any woman in Daytona 500, Indianapolis 500 (born in Wisconsin)
- David Patrick, Olympic hurdler
- Deval Patrick, governor of Massachusetts 2007–15
- Laurdine Patrick, saxophonist
- Leonard Patrick, organized crime figure (born in England)
- Stan Patrick, pro basketball player
- Alexandra Patsavas, TV/film music supervisor, Grey's Anatomy, Supernatural, The Hunger Games: Catching Fire
- Lauren Patten, singer and actress, Tony Award winner
- Alicia Patterson, editor and publisher, founder of Newsday
- Cissy Patterson, editor and publisher, countess
- Don Patterson, producer, animator, director, The Smurfs, Dumbo, Pinocchio, Fantasia
- Francine Patterson, animal psychologist, taught language to Koko the gorilla
- Joseph Medill Patterson, editor, publisher, New York Daily News founder
- Pat Patterson, MLB player, New York Giants 1921
- Marty Pattin, pitcher for five MLB teams
- Spencer Patton, MLB relief pitcher
- Art Paul, graphic artist for Playboy 1953–83; designer of bunny logo
- Josh Paul, catcher for four MLB teams
- Gene Paulette, MLB infielder 1914–20
- Henry Paulson, financier, 2006–09 U.S. Secretary of the Treasury (born in Florida)
- Pawnee Bill, Wild West showman with Buffalo Bill
- John Paxson, three-time NBA champion, executive for Chicago Bulls (born in Ohio)
- Melanie Paxson, actress
- Tom Paxton, folk musician and singer-songwriter, 2009 Grammy Lifetime Achievement Award
- Ethel L. Payne, journalist, activist
- John B. Payne, secretary of interior 1920–21 (born in West Virginia)
- Sally Payne, actress
- William Morton Payne, educator, writer (born in Massachusetts)
- Gary Payton, astronaut
- Jarrett Payton, pro football player, radio personality
- Sean Payton, head coach of Denver Broncos and Super Bowl XLIV champion New Orleans Saints (born in California)
- Walter Payton, Hall of Fame running back for Super Bowl XX champion Chicago Bears (born in Mississippi)

Pe–Pg

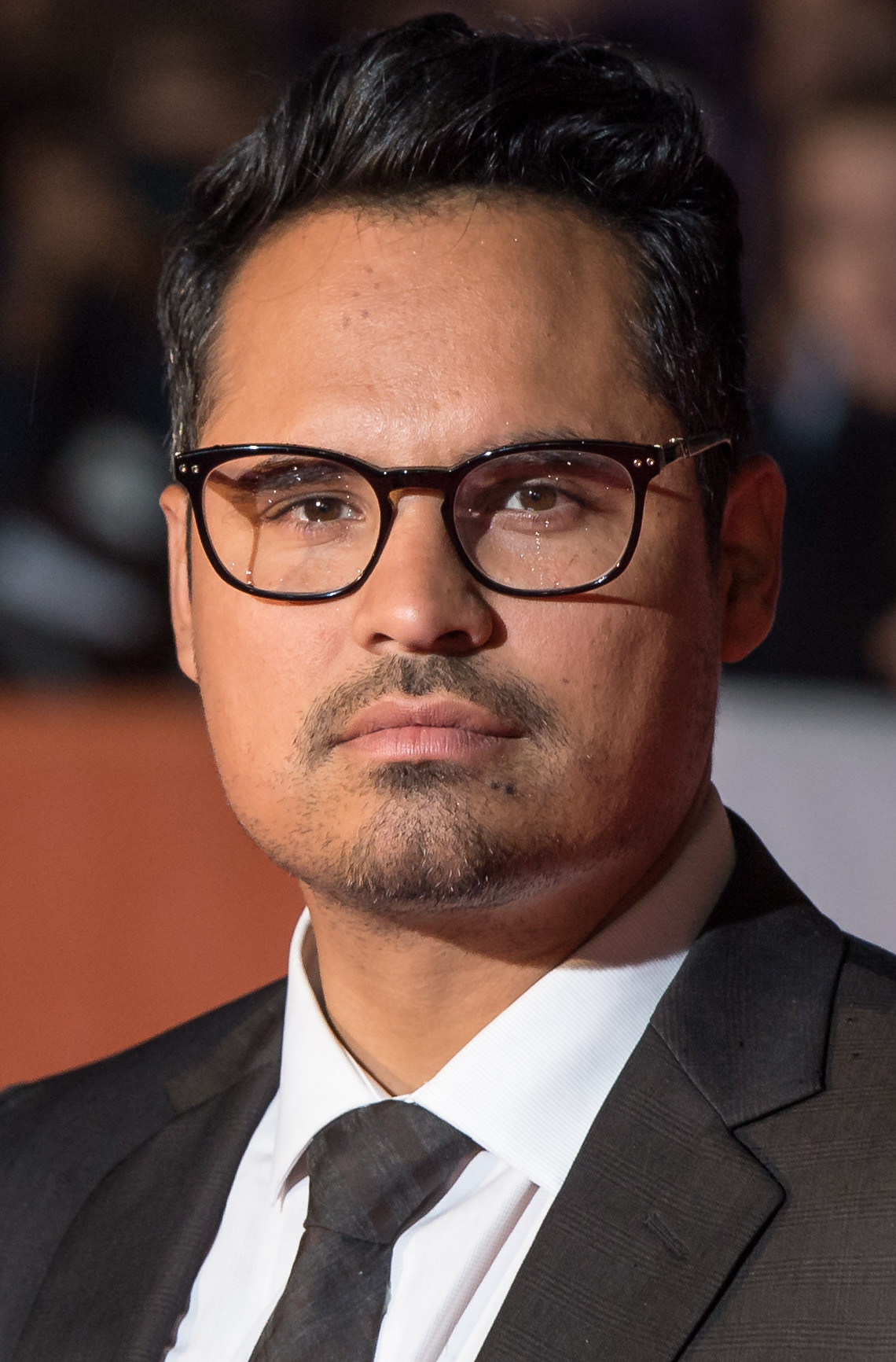
Michael Peña

- Walter C. Peacock, jeweler, Lincoln Park Gun Club founder
- Hal Pearl, organist
- Barry Pearson, NFL wide receiver 1972–76
- Drew Pearson, syndicated newspaper columnist
- Paul Martin Pearson, professor, governor of Virgin Islands
- Preston Pearson, basketball player for Illinois, NFL running back in five Super Bowls
- Todd Peat, NFL offensive lineman 1987–93
- Donald C. Peattie, author and botanist
- Elia W. Peattie, journalist and naturalist (born in Michigan)
- John Mason Peck, Baptist minister and author (born in Connecticut)
- Ferdinand Peck, philanthropist, financier of Auditorium Building, Chicago
- Richard Peck, author
- George Peek, economist
- Westbrook Pegler, journalist, 1941 Pulitzer Prize (born in Minnesota)
- Chris Pelekoudas, MLB umpire
- Rob Pelinka, general manager of Los Angeles Lakers, player for three Final Four basketball teams
- Paula Pell, Emmy-winning comedy writer, actress
- Clara Peller, commercial actress, "Where's the beef?"
- Anthony Pellicano, private investigator, imprisoned 2008–19
- Michael Peña, actor, World Trade Center, Crash, Shooter, End of Watch, American Hustle, The Martian
- D. A. Pennebaker, documentary filmmaker, Dont Look Back, The War Room, Unlocking the Cage
- Jack Perconte, infielder for four MLB teams
- Chuck Percy, president of Bell & Howell Corporation, U.S. senator (Republican) of Illinois for 20 years (born in Florida)
- Sylvia Perez, Chicago television journalist (born in Oklahoma)
- George Periolat, silent-film actor
- Dewayne Perkins, comedian and screenwriter
- Marlin Perkins, host of television's Wild Kingdom, 18-year director of Lincoln Park Zoo (born in Missouri)
- Walter Perkins, drummer
- Edythe Perlick, pro baseball player
- Bill Perry, cartoonist
- Felton Perry, actor, Magnum Force, RoboCop
- Jeff Perry, actor, Nash Bridges, Grey's Anatomy, Scandal
- Pat Perry, MLB pitcher 1985–90
- Zoe Perry, actress, Young Sheldon
- Rudy Perz, advertising executive, creator of Pillsbury Doughboy
- Jim Peterik, singer-songwriter with bands The Ides of March and Survivor, co-wrote "Eye of the Tiger"
- Devereaux Peters, third selection of 2012 WNBA draft, two-time champion with Minnesota Lynx
- Elizabeth Peters, mystery novelist
- Joan Peters, journalist and author
- Ted Petersen, offensive lineman for two-time Super Bowl champion Pittsburgh Steelers
- William Petersen, actor, Gil Grissom on CSI, Manhunter, To Live and Die in L.A., The Rat Pack
- Dan Peterson, pro basketball coach
- Drew Peterson, police officer, convicted murderer
- Fritz Peterson, pitcher for New York Yankees and Cleveland Indians
- Peter George Peterson, CEO of Lehman Bros., Bell & Howell, 1972–73 U.S. Secretary of Commerce (born in Nebraska)
- Bernice Petkere, songwriter
- Robert Petkoff, stage actor (born in California)
- Harry Mark Petrakis, author (born in Missouri)
- Lloyd Pettit, hockey sportscaster
- George Petty, pinup artist (born in Louisiana)
- Dave Peyton, songwriter and musician
- Jeff Pfeffer, MLB pitcher 1911–24
- Wally Pfister, Oscar-winning cinematographer
- Father Michael Pfleger, controversial Roman Catholic priest
- Lee Pfund, pitcher for Brooklyn Dodgers
- Randy Pfund, head coach for Los Angeles Lakers 1992–94, general manager for Miami Heat

Ph–Pn

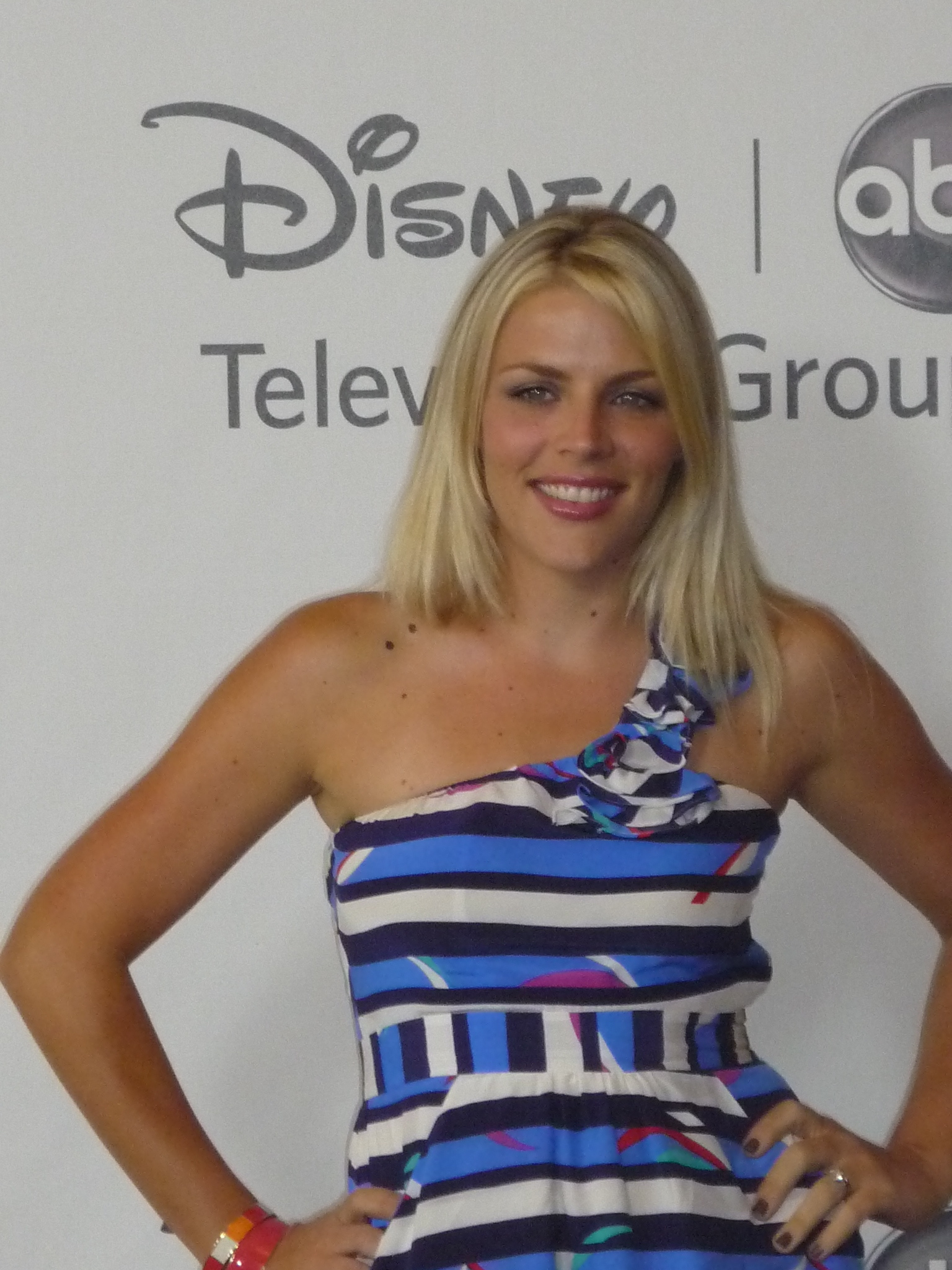
Busy Philipps

- Liz Phair, singer and songwriter (born in Connecticut)
- Roger Phegley, guard for five NBA teams
- Art Phelan, MLB player for Cincinnati Reds and Chicago Cubs
- Mary Philbin, silent-film actress, Phantom of the Opera
- Andy Phillip, Hall of Fame basketball player for Illinois
- Busy Philipps, actress, Dawson's Creek, Freaks and Geeks, ER
- Emo Philips, entertainer and comedian
- Irna Phillips, creator of Guiding Light and As the World Turns
- John Calhoun Phillips, governor of Arizona 1929–31
- Julianne Phillips, model, actress, first wife of Bruce Springsteen
- Kyra Phillips, television journalist
- Wally Phillips, radio personality (born in Ohio)
- William Phipps, actor, Cinderella (born in Indiana)
- Brian Piccolo, running back for Chicago Bears, subject of Brian's Song (born in Massachusetts)
- Bob Pickens, Olympic wrestler and Bears offensive lineman
- Ollie Pickering, first batter in MLB American League history
- William Pickering, 19th-century governor of Washington (born in England)
- Pat Pieper, public-address announcer at Wrigley Field for 59 years
- Alec Pierce, NFL wide receiver
- Billy Pierce, pitcher, scout, broadcaster for Chicago White Sox, seven-time All-Star (born in Michigan)
- George Pierce, MLB player 1912–17
- Walter M. Pierce, 17th governor of Oregon
- Jimmy Piersall, baseball player and Chicago sportscaster, subject of Fear Strikes Out (born in Connecticut)
- Geoff Pierson, actor, Unhappily Ever After, 24, Dexter
- Pete Pihos, decorated soldier, six-time Pro Bowl player for NFL's Philadelphia Eagles 1947–55 (born in Florida)
- Janet Pilgrim, model, three-time Playboy centerfold
- Andy Pilney, football coach, Tulane 1954–61 (born in Kansas)
- Steve Pink, writer, director, Accepted, Hot Tub Time Machine
- Allan Pinkerton, detective, founder of Pinkerton's agency
- Tonya Pinkins, Tony Award-winning actress, Jelly's Last Jam, Fading Gigolo, All My Children
- Maria Pinto, fashion designer
- Wally Pipp, first baseman for Detroit Tigers and 1923 World Series champion New York Yankees
- Larsa Pippen, reality TV personality, The Real Housewives of Miami
- Scottie Pippen, Hall of Fame forward for Chicago Bulls six-time champions (born in Arkansas)
- Louis Piquett, lawyer of John Dillinger
- Pauline Pirok, pro baseball player
- Skip Pitlock, MLB pitcher 1970–75
- Arthur Pitney, inventor of postage meter, co-founder of Pitney Bowes
- Jeremy Piven, Emmy-winning actor, Entourage, Mr. Selfridge, Very Bad Things, Old School
- Plain White T's, rock band from Chicago
- Polly Platt, film producer, screenwriter
- Kevin Plawecki, MLB catcher, 2012 Big Ten Player of the Year
- James E. Plew, aviation pioneer
- Pete Ploszek, actor, Teen Wolf, the Teenage Mutant Ninja Turtles films
- Brian Plotkin, pro soccer player, head coach for Army
- Ed Plumb, composer for Disney films, Fantasia, Bambi

Po–Pz

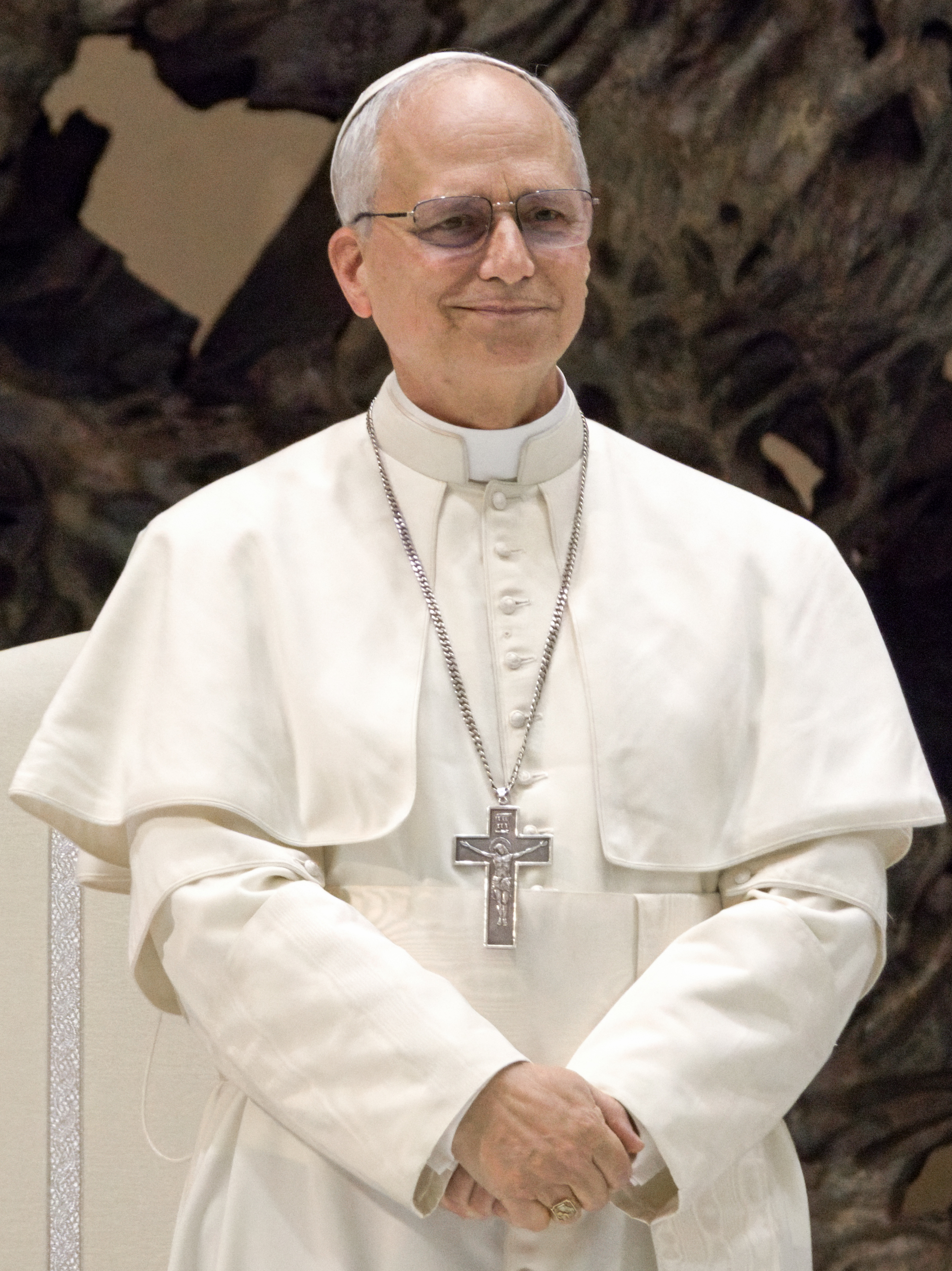
Pope Leo XIV (Robert Prevost)

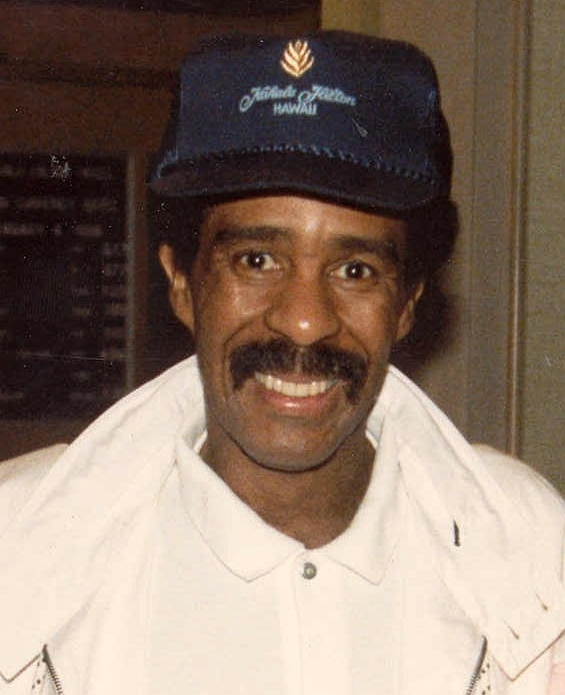
Richard Pryor

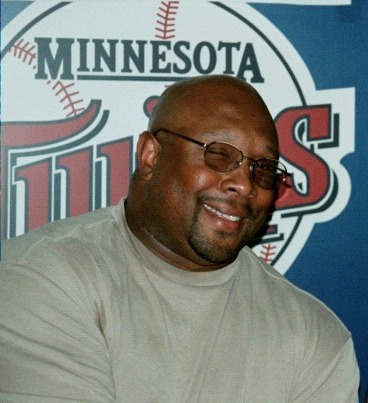
Kirby Puckett

- John Podesta, White House chief of staff under Bill Clinton
- Amy Poehler, comedian, actress, Second City, Saturday Night Live, Parks and Recreation (born in Massachusetts)
- Angelo Poffo, professional wrestler
- Tasha Pointer, basketball coach, UIC
- D. A. Points, professional golfer
- Matthew Polenzani, opera singer
- Ben Pollack, big-band era bandleader
- Fritz Pollard, first African-American head coach in NFL and Pro Football Hall of Famer
- Dan Ponce, radio-TV journalist, singer with Straight No Chaser
- Phil Ponce, Chicago television personality
- Irving Kane Pond, architect (born in Michigan)
- Cappie Pondexter, pro basketball player, 2007 MVP of WNBA Finals (born in California)
- Ernest Poole, Pulitzer Prize-winning novelist
- William Frederick Poole, first Chicago Public Library librarian, designed Newberry Library (born in Massachusetts)
- Carmelita Pope, actress
- Nathaniel Pope, politician and advocate of statehood (born in Kentucky)
- John Porter, U.S. representative 1980–2001
- H.V. Porter, coach, coined term "March Madness"
- Kevin Porter, guard for three NBA teams, four-time league assist leader
- Glenn Poshard, U.S. representative, Southern Illinois University president
- Michael Posner, attorney, human rights advocate, Assistant Secretary of State under Barack Obama
- C. W. Post, breakfast cereal mogul
- Marjorie Merriweather Post, founder of General Foods
- Philip S. Post, Civil War general, U.S. representative (born in New York)
- Lou Pote, MLB pitcher 1999–2004
- Nels Potter, pitcher for six MLB teams
- Leah Poulos-Mueller, speed skater, 1976 and 1980 Olympic medalist
- Jordyn Poulter, volleyball gold medalist, 2020 Summer Olympics
- Alma Webster Powell, opera singer
- Edward B. Powell, film composer
- Jack Powell, MLB pitcher, won 245 games
- John Wesley Powell, explorer, Civil War officer, Illinois Wesleyan professor (born in New York)
- Maud Powell, violinist
- Paul Powell, controversial politician
- Roger Powell, Illinois basketball player, Valparaiso head coach
- Jenny Powers, actress and 2000 Miss Illinois
- John A. "Shorty" Powers, NASA official, voice of Mercury Control (born in Ohio)
- Richard Powers, author, 2019 Pulitzer Prize
- John Powless, basketball head coach for Wisconsin 1968–76
- A. George Pradel, mayor of Naperville 1995–2015
- Deborah Pratt, actress, writer
- Toni Preckwinkle, teacher, president of Cook County Board
- Tom Preissing, NHL defenseman
- Mike Prendergast, MLB pitcher 1914–19
- Patrick Prendergast, assassin of Chicago mayor, 1893 (born in Ireland)
- Gary Pressy, organist at Wrigley Field 1987–2019
- Keith Preston, writer
- Pope Leo XIV, born Robert Francis Prevost, head of the Catholic Church since 2025
- Louis Price, singer with Temptations, Drifters
- Melvin Price, 33-year U.S. representative
- Julian Priester, trombonist
- Quinn Priester, MLB pitcher
- George W. Prince, eight-term U.S. representative
- Tom Prince, MLB catcher 1987–2003
- Joe Principe, musician, member of band Rise Against
- John Prine, singer-songwriter, 2020 Grammy Lifetime Achievement Award
- Bret Prinz, MLB pitcher 2001–07
- Mike Prior, defensive back for Super Bowl XXXI champion Green Bay Packers
- A.N. Pritzker, lawyer and philanthropist (born in Russia)
- Donald Pritzker, co-founder and president of Hyatt hotels
- Jay Pritzker, co-founder, Hyatt Hotel chain
- J. B. Pritzker, principal owner of Hyatt, philanthropist, 43rd governor of Illinois
- Penny Pritzker, U.S. secretary of commerce 2013–17
- Robert Pritzker, president of Marmon Group
- Thomas Pritzker, chairman of Hyatt Hotel
- Cory Provus, baseball broadcaster
- William Proxmire, 42-year U.S. senator of Wisconsin
- Richard Pryor, Emmy and Grammy Award-winning comedian and actor, The Mack, Silver Streak, Stir Crazy, The Toy, Superman III
- Roman Pucinski, politician (Democrat), U.S. representative 1959–73
- Kirby Puckett, Hall of Fame center fielder for two-time World Series champion Minnesota Twins
- Tom Pukstys, six-time U.S. javelin champion
- George M. Pullman, industrialist, designer of Pullman sleeping car (born in New York)
- Edward Mills Purcell, winner of Nobel Prize in Physics
- David Purcey, MLB pitcher 2008–13
- Todd Purdum, national editor and political correspondent for Vanity Fair
- Ken Purdy, automotive writer
- Tim Purpura, baseball executive
- C. C. Pyle, sports promoter
- Mike Pyle, center for Chicago Bears 1961–69 (born in Iowa)

== Q ==
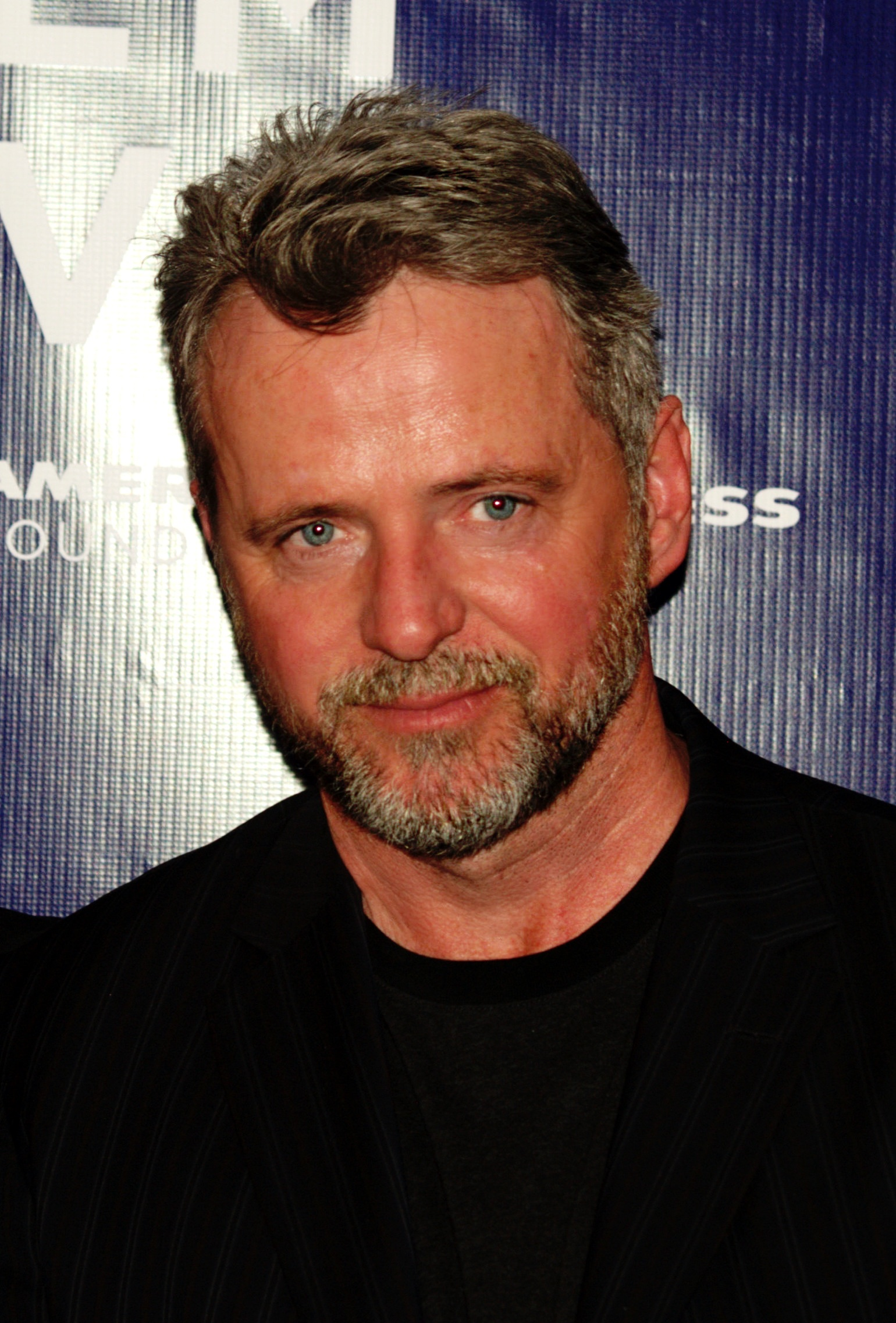
Aidan Quinn

- Mike Quade, coach and manager for Chicago Cubs
- John Qualen, actor, Casablanca, The Grapes of Wrath, The Searchers (born in Canada)
- William Quarter, first bishop of Chicago (born in Ireland)
- James C. Quayle, newspaper publisher, father of Dan Quayle
- John Francis Queeny, founder of Monsanto
- Joel Quenneville, coach of three-time NHL champion Chicago Blackhawks (born in Canada)
- Jeff Query, wide receiver for Green Bay Packers and Cincinnati Bengals
- Smiley Quick, pro golfer
- Allie Quigley, basketball player for DePaul and 2021 WNBA champion Chicago Sky
- Mike Quigley, politician (Democrat), U.S. representative
- Elaine Quijano, television journalist
- Frank Quilici, player, coach and manager for Minnesota Twins
- Peter Quillin, middleweight boxer
- Jack Quinlan, sportscaster
- Maeve Quinlan, tennis player and actress, The Bold and the Beautiful, South of Nowhere
- Michael R. Quinlan, chairman of Loyola and McDonald's
- Aidan Quinn, actor, Legends of the Fall, Benny and Joon, Michael Collins, Avalon, Mary Shelley's Frankenstein, Elementary
- Declan Quinn, cinematographer, Leaving Las Vegas, Vanity Fair, Hamilton
- Jeff Quinn, football coach
- Louis Quinn, actor, 77 Sunset Strip
- Pat Quinn, politician (Democrat), attorney, state treasurer, governor of Illinois 2009–14
- Adolfo "Shabba Doo" Quiñones, actor, dancer, choreographer
- Rachel Quon, pro soccer player (born in California)

== R ==
Ra–Rd

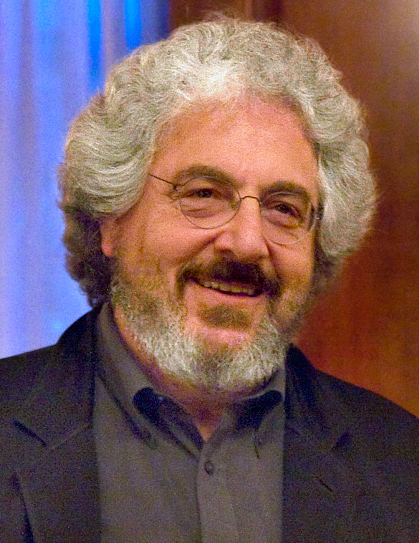
Harold Ramis

- Charles Radbourn, Hall of Fame baseball pitcher (born in New York)
- Ted Radcliffe, pro baseball player 1928–46 (born in Alabama)
- Doug Rader, MLB infielder 1967–77, manager of Texas Rangers, Chicago White Sox, California Angels
- Phil Radford, environmental leader, Greenpeace executive director
- Bill Radovich, football player and actor
- Sondra Radvanovsky, opera soprano
- Zoe Rae, silent-film actress
- Robert O. Ragland, film score composer
- Tom Railsback, politician (Republican), eight-term U.S. representative
- Henry Thomas Rainey, politician (Democrat), U.S. representative 1903–34, speaker of the House under FDR
- John W. Rainey, U.S. representative 1918–23
- Mamie Rallins, hurdler, coach, two-time Olympian
- Buck Ram, songwriter, "Only You", "The Great Pretender"
- Sendhil Ramamurthy, actor, Heroes, Beauty & the Beast, Covert Affairs
- Harold Ramis, actor, director, writer SCTV, Ghostbusters, Caddyshack, Stripes, Groundhog Day, National Lampoon's Vacation
- Charles H. Ramsey, police commissioner of Philadelphia 2008–16, police chief of Washington, D.C. 1998–2007
- Edwin Ramsey, U.S. Army officer, guerrilla leader during World War II Japanese occupation of the Philippines
- Lorene Ramsey, softball, basketball Hall of Famer (born in Missouri)
- Ray Ramsey, defensive back for Chicago Cardinals
- Bill Rancic, television personality, The Apprentice, Giuliana and Bill
- William Rand, founder of Skokie-based Rand McNally (born in Massachusetts)
- Clarence B. Randall, chairman of Inland Steel, presidential advisor (born in New York)
- Martha Randall, swimmer, bronze medalist in 1964 Summer Olympics
- Rebel Randall, actress, radio personality
- Tony Randazzo, MLB umpire
- Wayne Randazzo, MLB broadcaster for Los Angeles Angels
- Betsy Randle, actress, Boy Meets World
- Brian Randle, NBA coach and former Israeli Basketball Premier League player
- Chasson Randle, pro basketball player
- Antwaan Randle El, NFL wide receiver 2002–10, played for Super Bowl XL champion Pittsburgh Steelers
- Kerri Randles, actress
- Isabel Randolph, actress
- Thomas E. G. Ransom, Civil War general, Ransom, Illinois named for him (born in Vermont)
- Kwame Raoul, 42nd Illinois attorney general
- Frederic Raphael, Oscar-winning screenwriter, Darling, Two for the Road
- Adam Rapp, novelist, playwright, screenwriter, musician, film director
- Anthony Rapp, actor, singer, A Beautiful Mind, Rent, Dazed and Confused, Road Trip
- David Rasche, actor, Succession, United 93, Sledge Hammer!
- Wayne Rasmussen, defensive back for Detroit Lions 1964–72
- John Ratcliffe, Republican congressman from Texas 2015–20
- George Ratkovicz, pro basketball player
- Heather Rattray, actress, As the World Turns, Guiding Light
- Green Berry Raum, brigadier general, chief of Internal Revenue Service 1876–83
- Bruce Rauner, politician (Republican), governor of Illinois 2015–19
- John Aaron Rawlins, Civil War officer, U.S. secretary of war
- Lou Rawls, soul, jazz and blues singer and actor, winner of three Grammy Awards
- Charles Ray, actor, producer, director
- Hugh Ray, football official, Pro Football Hall of Fame
- James Earl Ray, carried out April 1968 assassination of Martin Luther King Jr.
- Joie Ray, three-time Olympian, runner in Track Hall of Fame
- Lyman Beecher Ray, lieutenant governor 1889–93 (born in Vermont)
- Gene Rayburn, television personality, Match Game
- Benjamin Wright Raymond, third mayor of Chicago (born in New York)
- Bugs Raymond, MLB pitcher 1904–11
- Robin Raymond, actress, There's No Business Like Show Business
- Ray Rayner, Chicago television personality (born in New York)

Re–Rh

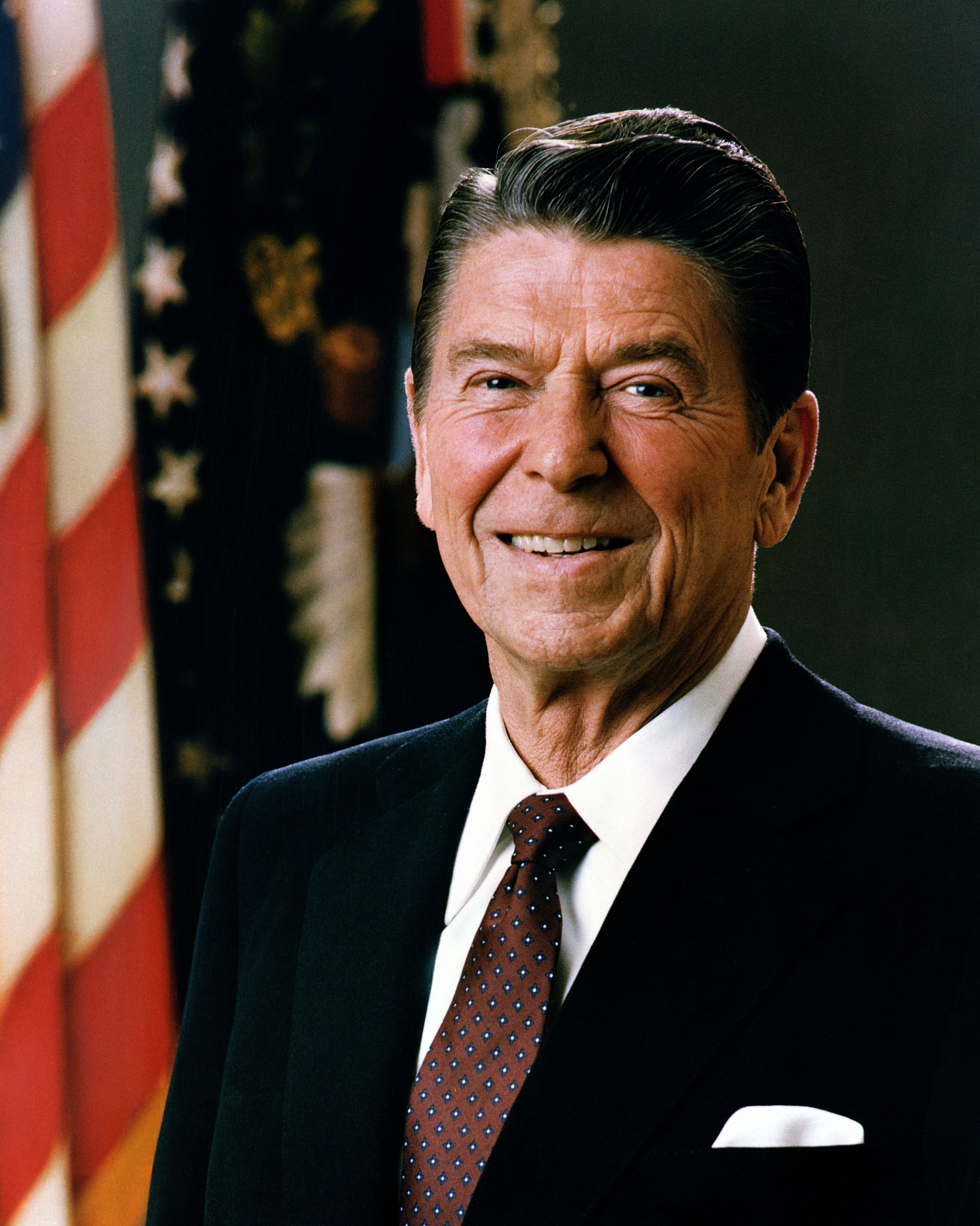
Ronald Reagan

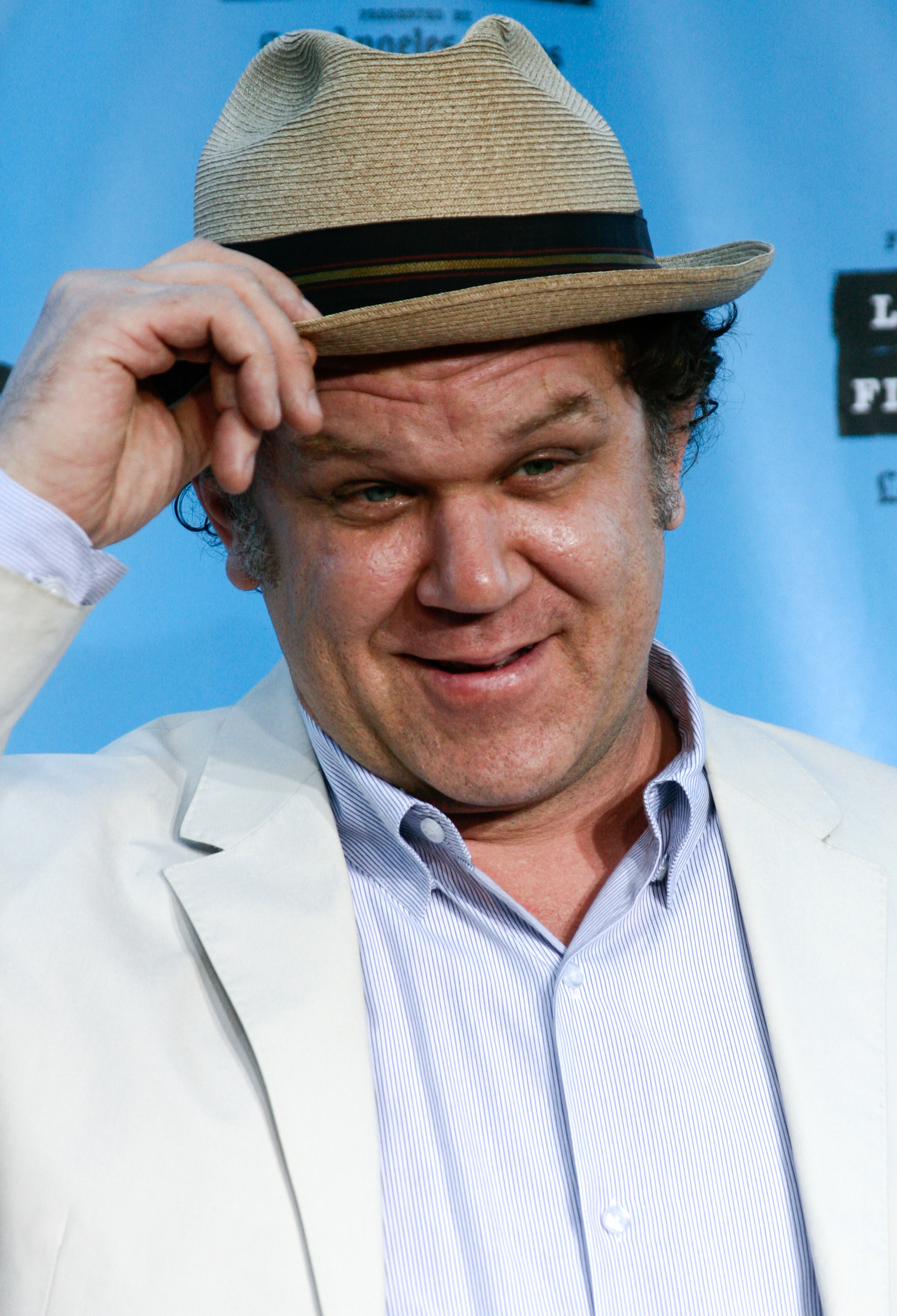
John C. Reilly

- Jack Reagan, father of President Ronald Reagan
- Nancy Reagan, actress, 1981–89 First Lady of the United States (born in New York)
- Neil Reagan, radio-TV executive, older brother of Ronald Reagan
- Nelle Wilson Reagan, mother of Ronald Reagan
- Ronald Reagan, actor, politician (Republican), governor of California and 40th president of the United States (born in Tampico, Illinois)
- Billy Reay, won 516 games as Chicago Blackhawks coach (born in Canada)
- Eugene Record, singer, The Chi-Lites
- William Reddick, businessman, philanthropist, politician
- Jheri Redding, hair care entrepreneur
- Quinn Redeker, actor, screenwriter, The Young and the Restless, Days of Our Lives, Dan Raven, The Deer Hunter
- Courtney Reed, actress
- Dizzy Reed, musician, Guns N' Roses
- James F. Reed, organizer of Donner Party (born in Ireland)
- Jeff Reed, MLB catcher 1984–2000
- Jimmy Reed, guitarist in Blues Hall of Fame (born in Mississippi)
- John Shedd Reed, president of Atchison, Topeka and Santa Fe Railway
- Kennedy J. Reed, theoretical atomic physicist
- Robert Reed, actor, Mike Brady on The Brady Bunch
- Rondi Reed, stage actress, singer and performer
- Tommy Rees, quarterback for Notre Dame 2010–13
- George Reeves, actor, Superman (born in Iowa)
- Tim Regan, pro soccer player
- Henry Regnery, publisher, founder of Regnery Publishing
- Wally Rehg, MLB player 1912–19
- Kathy Reichs, crime writer, forensic anthropologist, academic
- Charlotte Thompson Reid, singer, politician (Republican), U.S. representative 1963–71
- Frank R. Reid, attorney in court-martial of General Billy Mitchell, U.S. representative 1923–35
- Joe Reiff, basketball All-American for Northwestern
- John Reilly, actor, Passions, Sunset Beach, Iron Man
- John C. Reilly, actor, Talladega Nights, Step Brothers, Chicago, Gangs of New York, The Perfect Storm, Wreck-It Ralph
- Ed Reimers, television announcer
- Johan Reinhard, explorer
- Bill Reinhardt, musician and bandleader
- Haley Reinhart, singer, American Idol
- Jerry Reinsdorf, owner of Chicago White Sox and Chicago Bulls (born in New York)
- Todd Reirden, NHL player and coach
- Bryan Rekar, MLB pitcher
- Zach Reks, MLB outfielder
- Pat Renella, actor, Bullitt
- Marcus Reno, Civil War officer, served with Gen. Custer in Battle of the Little Bighorn
- Nancy Reno, beach volleyball player
- Pug Rentner, halfback, College Football Hall of Fame player for Northwestern
- REO Speedwagon, rock band from Champaign
- Ken Retzer, MLB catcher 1961–64
- Paul Reuschel, pitcher for Chicago Cubs 1975–79
- Rick Reuschel, pitcher for five Major League teams, three-time All-Star
- Katherine Reutter, speed skater, 2011 world champion, medalist in 2010 Vancouver Olympics
- Nellie Revell, journalist, publicist
- Frank Reynolds, Chicago and ABC newscaster (born in Indiana)
- John Reynolds, judge, U.S. representative, governor of Illinois 1830–34 (born in Pennsylvania)
- Marcellas Reynolds, actor, fashion stylist, entertainment reporter, TV host
- Virginia Richmond Reynolds, artist
- Wellington J. Reynolds, artist
- La Julia Rhea, opera singer
- John Rheinecker, pitcher for Texas Rangers 2006–07
- Shonda Rhimes, television producer, creator, Scandal, Grey's Anatomy
- William C. Rhoden, sports journalist
- Betty Jane Rhodes, singer, actress, Sweater Girl, The Fleet's In
- Jennifer Rhodes, actress, Charmed, Heathers

Ri–Rn

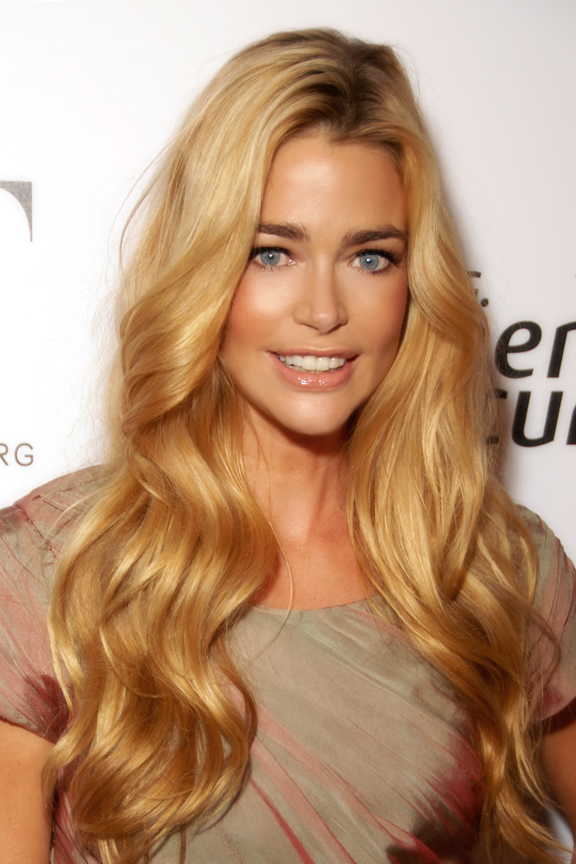
Denise Richards

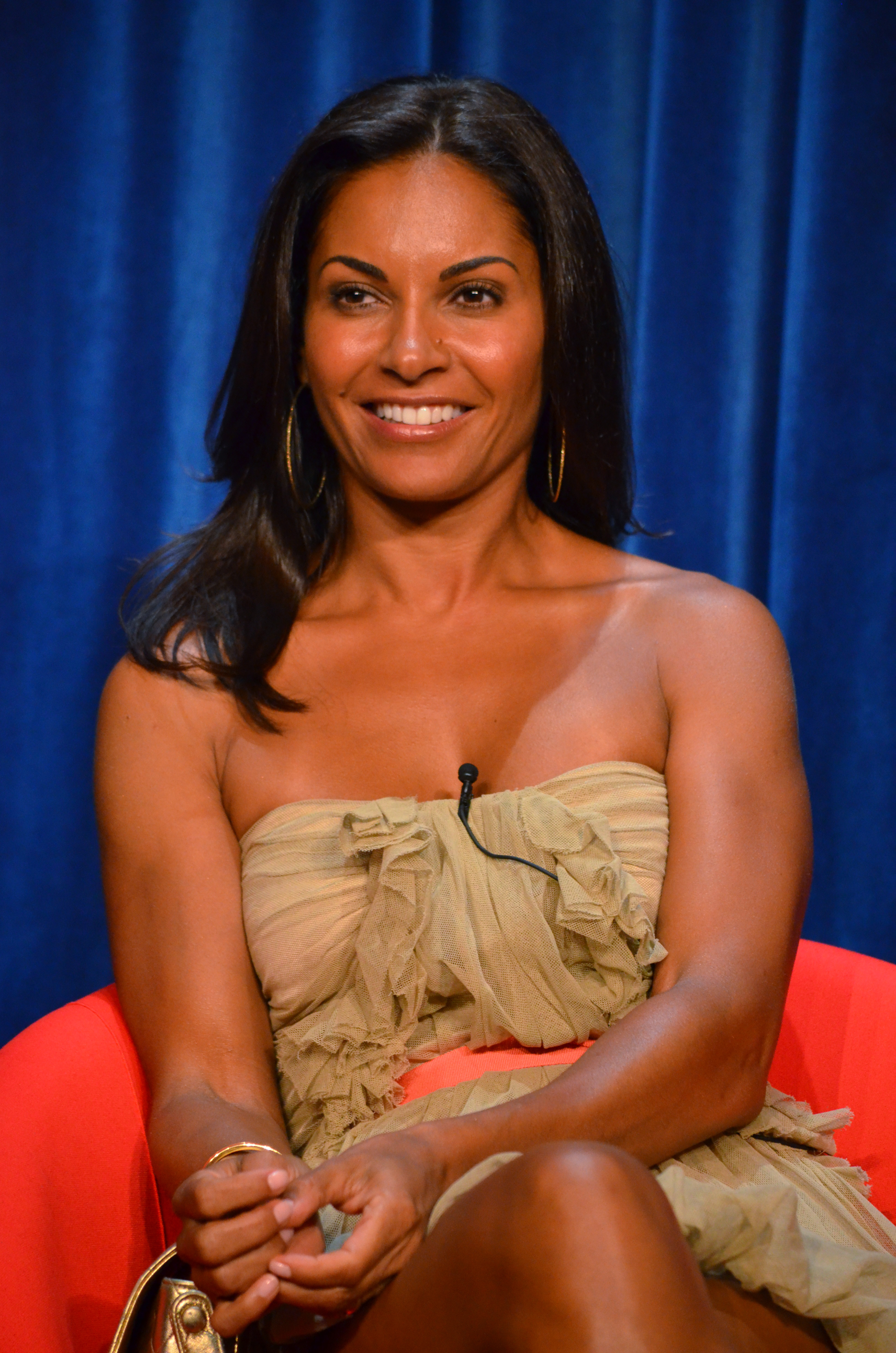
Salli Richardson

- Paul Ricca, mobster with Chicago Outfit
- John Blake Rice, actor, producer, Mayor of Chicago 1865–69 (born in Maryland)
- Craig Rice, mystery novelist and screenwriter
- Dan and Ada Rice, philanthropists, owners of 1965 Kentucky Derby winner Lucky Debonair
- Fred Rice Jr., officer, superintendent, Chicago Police Department
- Simeon Rice, defensive lineman for Illinois and Super Bowl XXXVII champion Tampa Bay Buccaneers
- Wallace Rice, poet, writer, designer of Flag of Chicago (born in Canada)
- Bob Richards, pole vaulter, gold medalist 1952 Helsinki Olympics and 1956 Melbourne Olympics
- Carol Richards, singer, radio and television performer
- Denise Richards, actress, The World Is Not Enough, Denise Richards: It's Complicated
- Trevor Richards, MLB pitcher
- Cathy Richardson, singer, Jefferson Starship
- Lee Richardson, actor, Prizzi's Honor, Prince of the City
- Quentin Richardson, player for five NBA teams
- Salli Richardson, actress, Eureka, Gargoyles, Family Law
- Sy Richardson, actor, Pushing Daisies
- William Alexander Richardson, governor of Nebraska territory, U.S. senator of Illinois (born in Kentucky)
- Lionel Richie, multiple Grammy Award-winning singer in Rock and Roll Hall of Fame (born in Alabama)
- Julius B. Richmond, U.S. surgeon general 1977–81
- Steve Richmond, defenseman for four NHL teams
- Andy Richter, actor, comedian, Late Night with Conan O'Brien, Madagascar films & cartoons
- Joyce Ricketts, pro baseball player
- Laura Ricketts, lawyer, co-owner of Chicago Cubs (born in Nebraska)
- Tom Ricketts, banker, owner and chairman of Cubs (born in Nebraska)
- Todd Ricketts, businessman, co-owner of Cubs (born in Nebraska)
- Hyman G. Rickover, admiral, attended Marshall High School in Chicago (born in Poland)
- Lucille Ricksen, silent film actress
- John Ridgely, actor, The Big Sleep, Destination Tokyo
- John Riegger, golfer
- Marty Riessen, tennis player, US Open, French Open, Wimbledon doubles and mixed doubles champion
- Dorothy Comiskey Rigney, owner of Chicago White Sox 1956–58
- Johnny Rigney, White Sox pitcher and general manager
- Boots Riley, rapper, producer
- Ida Morey Riley, founder of Columbia College Chicago
- Jack Riley, Northwestern player in College Football Hall of Fame, silver medalist 1932 Olympic wrestling
- Patrick William Riordan, archbishop of San Francisco 1884–1914 (born in Canada)
- Minnie Riperton, singer, "Lovin' You", mother of Maya Rudolph
- Wally Ris, swimmer, two-time NCAA champion, two 1948 Olympic golds
- Rise Against, rock band from Chicago
- Bill Risley, pitcher for three MLB teams
- Laura J. Rittenhouse, activist, writer, poet, clubwoman
- Doc Rivers, NBA point guard 1983–96, head coach of five teams
- Mike Rizzo, general manager of Washington Nationals
- Rick Rizzs, baseball broadcaster

Ro–Rt

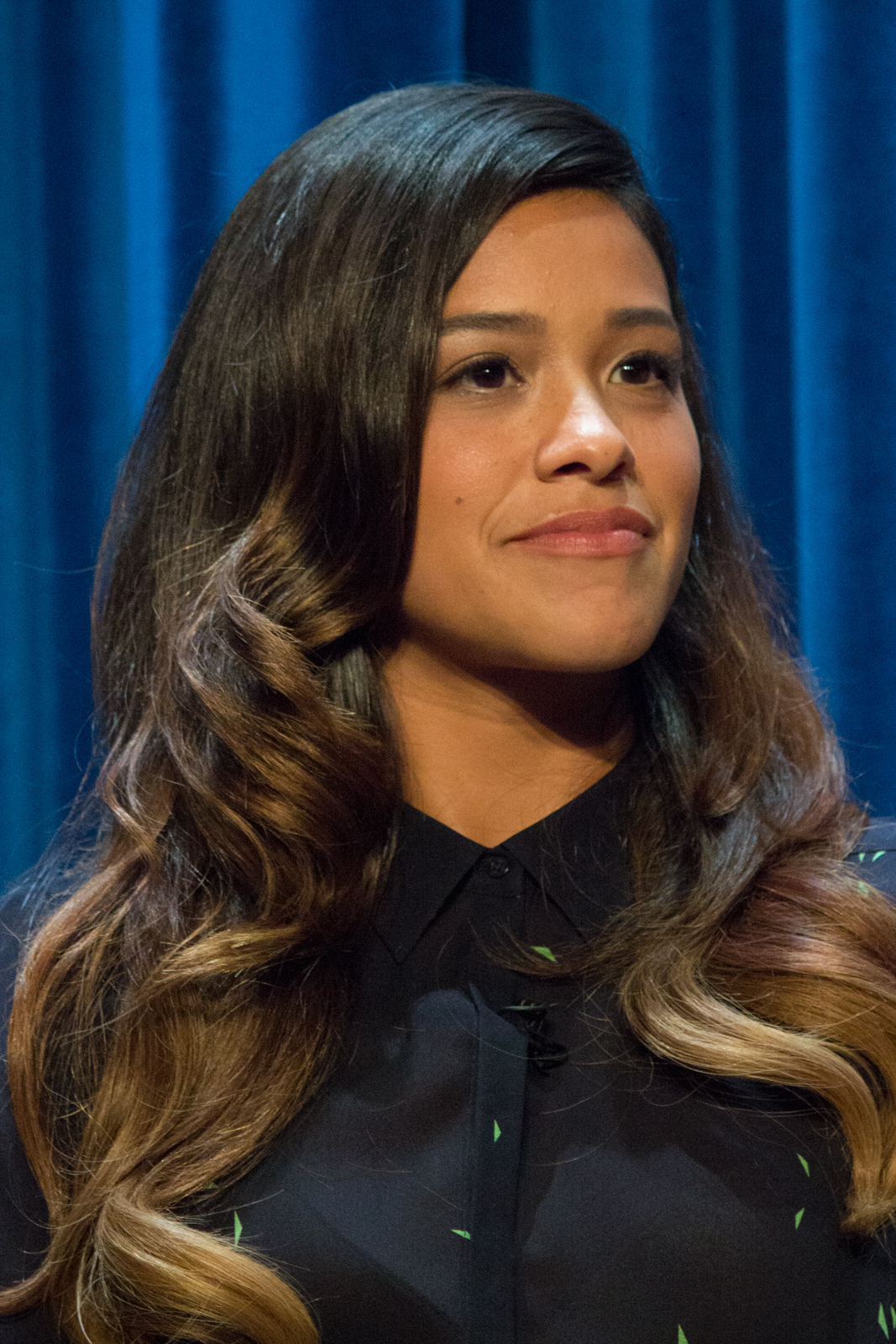
Gina Rodriguez

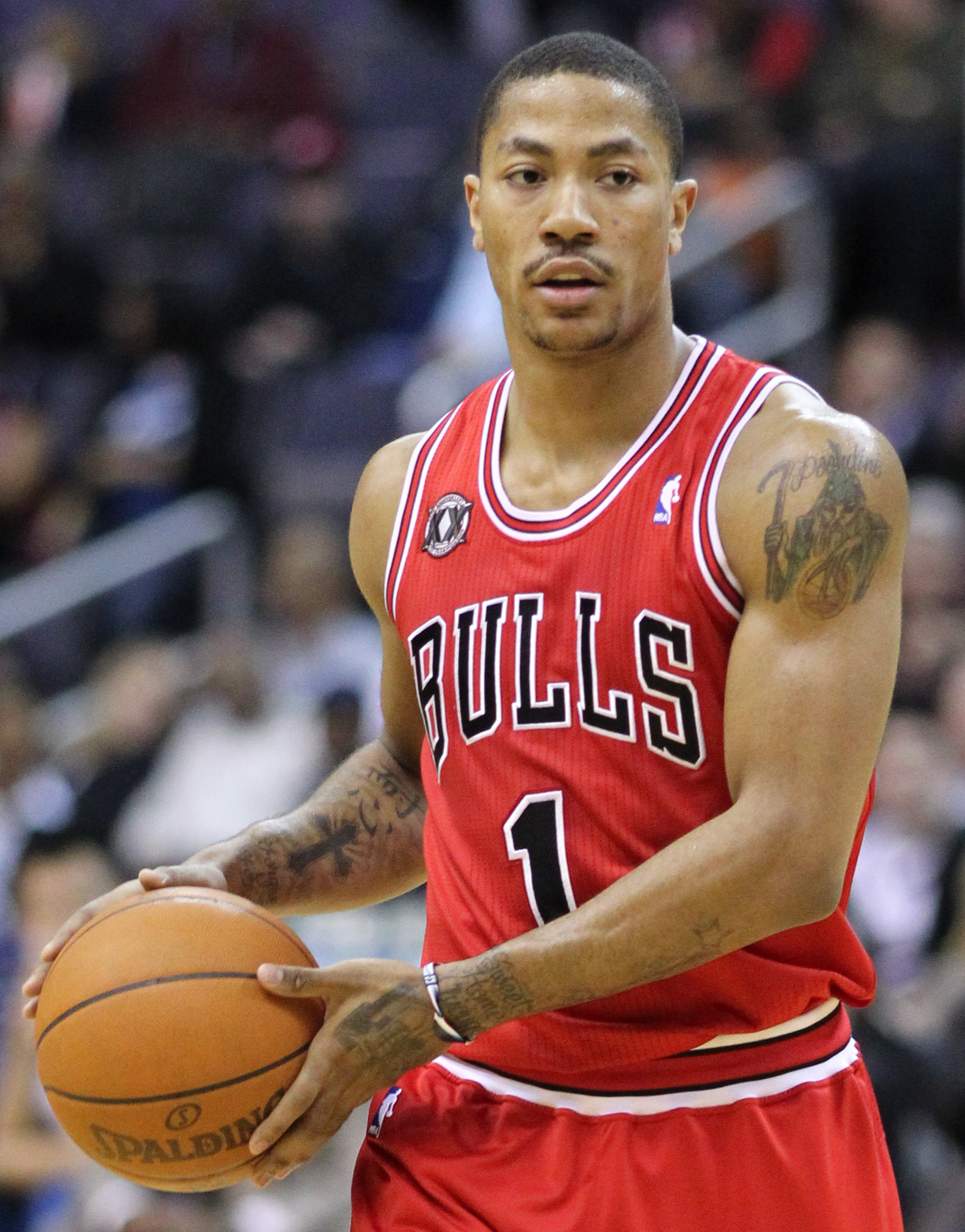
Derrick Rose

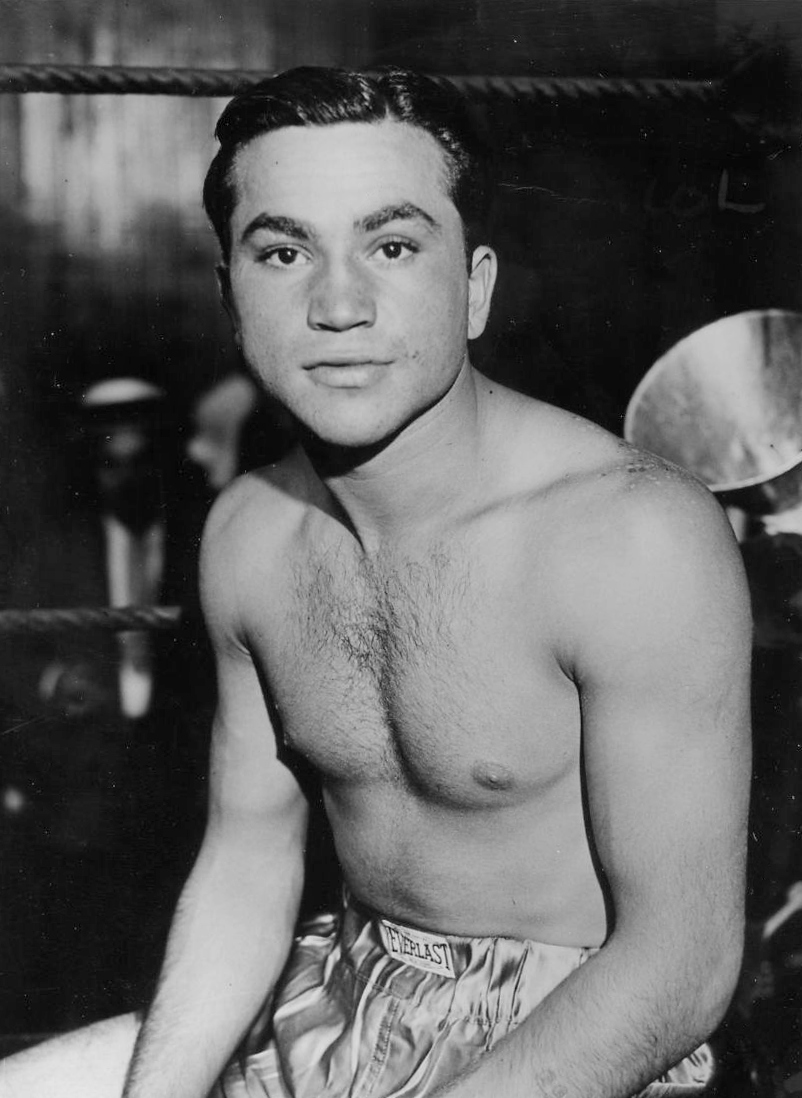
Barney Ross

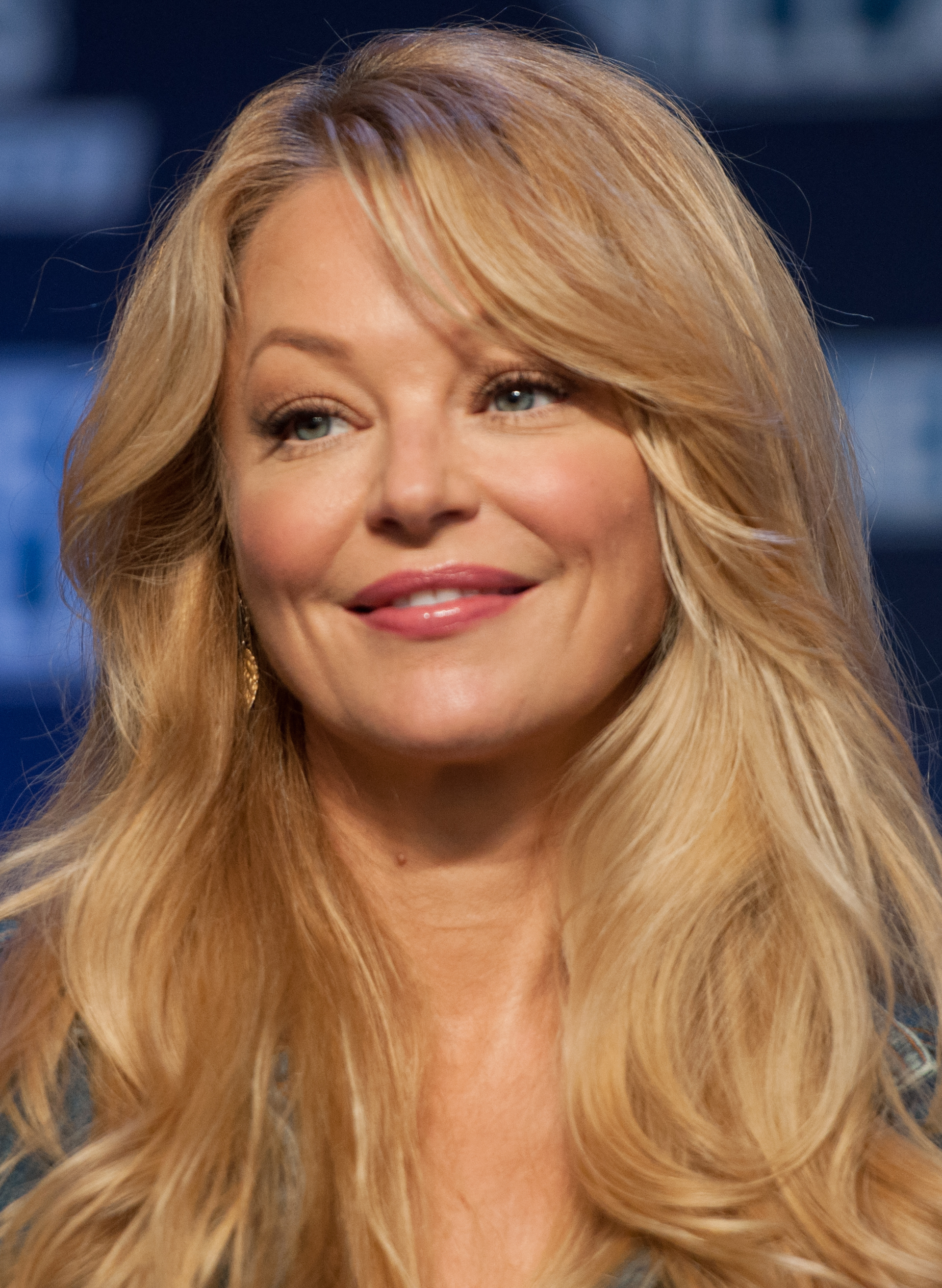
Charlotte Ross

- Tanner Roark, MLB pitcher 2013–21
- Jason Robards, Oscar-winning actor, A Thousand Clowns, All the President's Men, Julia, Once Upon a Time in the West, Parenthood, Philadelphia
- Jason Robards Sr., actor (born in Michigan)
- Kevin Roberson, MLB outfielder 1993–96
- Gale Robbins, singer, model and actress, Calamity Jane, The Barkleys of Broadway, Three Little Words
- Leona Roberts, actress, Gone With the Wind
- Robin Roberts, Hall of Fame starting pitcher primarily for Philadelphia Phillies, won 286 games
- Sue Roberts, golfer
- Nan C. Robertson, journalist, 1983 Pulitzer Prize
- Angela Robinson, director, screenwriter, producer, True Blood, The L Word, Hung
- Arthur B. Robinson, biochemist, politician
- Betty Robinson, sprinter, gold medalist at 1928 and 1936 Olympics
- Chuckie Robinson, MLB catcher
- Craig Robinson, actor, comedian, The Office, Last Comic Standing, Hot Tub Time Machine, This Is the End
- Craig Robinson, basketball coach, brother of Michelle Obama
- Flynn Robinson, guard for four NBA teams
- Frank M. Robinson, author
- John McCracken Robinson, lawyer, U.S. senator of Illinois 1830–41 (born in Kentucky)
- Kelsey Robinson, indoor volleyball player
- Marian Shields Robinson, mother-in-law of President Barack Obama
- Robin Robinson, Chicago television journalist
- Will Robinson, basketball coach for Illinois State, first African-American head coach at Division I school (born in North Carolina)
- Bill Robinzine, DePaul and pro basketball player
- Lelia P. Roby, philanthropist; founder, Ladies of the Grand Army of the Republic
- Mason Rocca, Princeton and pro basketball player
- James Roche, CEO and chairman of General Motors 1965–71
- John A. Roche, president of elevated railway, Mayor of Chicago 1887–89 (born in New York)
- Elizabeth Rochford, judge, Supreme Court of Illinois
- Sharon Percy Rockefeller, first lady of West Virginia 1977–85 (born in California)
- Knute Rockne, College Football Hall of Fame head coach for Notre Dame Fighting Irish (born in Norway)
- George Lincoln Rockwell, founder of American Nazi Party
- Robert Rockwell, actor, Our Miss Brooks, The Man from Blackhawk, Lassie, The Red Menace
- Leo Rodak, boxer
- Steve Rodby, musician
- William A. Rodenberg, 10-term U.S. representative
- Mark Rodenhauser, NFL center 1987–99
- Jimmy Rodgers, head coach of Minnesota Timberwolves, Boston Celtics
- Dorothy Howell Rodham, mother of Hillary Clinton
- Hugh Rodham, lawyer, brother of Hillary Clinton
- Freddy Rodríguez, actor, Six Feet Under, Ugly Betty, Planet Terror
- Francisco Rodriguez, boxer (born in Mexico)
- Gina Rodriguez, actress, Jane the Virgin, The Bold and the Beautiful
- Richard Roeper, columnist, film critic, co-host of At the Movies
- Billy Rogell, MLB infielder 1925–40
- Annette Rogers, sprinter, relay gold medalist, 1932 and 1936 Olympics
- Carl Rogers, prominent psychologist
- Desiree Rogers, CEO of Johnson Publishing (born in Louisiana)
- Jimmy Rogers, blues musician (born in Mississippi)
- John W. Rogers Jr., founder of Ariel Capital, head of Barack Obama inauguration committee
- Michael S. Rogers, admiral, director of National Security Agency
- Patience D. Roggensack, chief justice, Wisconsin Supreme Court 2015–21
- Len Rohde, lineman for San Francisco 49ers 1960–74
- Mark Romanek, Grammy-winning music video and film director, One Hour Photo, Never Let Me Go
- Christina Romer, chair of Council of Economic Advisers under Barack Obama
- Miles Park Romney, builder, Mormon leader, great-grandfather of Mitt Romney
- Tony Romo, quarterback, Eastern Illinois and Dallas Cowboys (born in California)
- Michael Rooker, actor, Cliffhanger, Days of Thunder, Guardians of the Galaxy (born in Alabama)
- John E. Rooney, CEO of U.S. Cellular 2000–10
- Sean Rooney, volleyball player, NCAA champion at Pepperdine, gold medalist at 2008 Beijing Olympics
- John Root, architect
- Adam Rosales, MLB infielder 2008–18
- Allison Rosati, Chicago television journalist (born in Delaware)
- Derrick Rose, guard for New York Knicks, top pick of 2008 NBA draft, 2008–09 NBA Rookie of the Year
- Fred Rose, songwriter, Country Music Hall of Fame (born in Indiana)
- Helen Rose, Oscar-winning costume designer
- Roger Rose, actor, voice actor, former VH1 VJ, Monsters and Mysteries in America, The Tick, Quack Pack, Happy Feet
- Timothy M. Rose, actor, puppeteer, Return of the Jedi, The Dark Crystal
- Wesley Rose, music producer
- Johnny Roselli, organized crime figure (born in Italy)
- Jacky Rosen, U.S. senator from Nevada
- Clarke Rosenberg, American-Israeli basketball player
- Milt Rosenberg, professor, radio host
- Tom Rosenberg, film producer, Million Dollar Baby, The Hurricane, Runaway Bride, Underworld series
- Frank Rosenthal, organized crime figure
- Julius Rosenwald, philanthropist, president of Sears, Roebuck & Company, founder of Museum of Science and Industry
- Lessing J. Rosenwald, president of Sears
- Peter Roskam, politician (Republican), U.S. representative 2007–19
- Arthur Ross, Oscar-nominated screenwriter, Brubaker, The Great Race
- Barney Ross, boxing world champion (born in New York)
- Charlotte Ross, actress, NYPD Blue, Beggars and Choosers
- Leonard Fulton Ross, Civil War general
- Lewis Winans Ross, lawyer, Mexican–American War officer, U.S. representative (born in New York)
- Ossian M. Ross, farmer, War of 1812 officer, founder of Lewistown and Havana (born in New York)
- Ricco Ross, actor, Westbeach
- Dan Rostenkowski, politician (Democrat), U.S. representative 1959–95, chairman of House Ways and Means Committee
- Marv Rotblatt, pitcher for Chicago White Sox 1949–52
- Matt Roth, NFL defensive end 2005–11
- Veronica Roth, author of Divergent series (born in New York)
- Claude Rothgeb, football coach for Colorado State, Rice
- Larry Rothschild, MLB manager and pitching coach
- John L. Rotz, Hall of Fame jockey
- Tom Rouen, punter for six NFL teams
- Pants Rowland, manager of Chicago White Sox 1915–18 (born in Wisconsin)
- Pleasant Rowland, founder of American Girl
- Cynthia Rowley, fashion designer
- Rosey Rowswell, baseball broadcaster
- Bill Roy, U.S. representative in Kansas 1971–75
- Willy Roy, player and coach, Soccer Hall of Fame (born in Germany)
- Stan Royer, infielder for St. Louis Cardinals 1961–64
- Mike Royko, Pulitzer Prize-winning newspaper columnist
- Andrew Rozdilsky Jr., ballpark mascot Andy the Clown

Ru–Rz

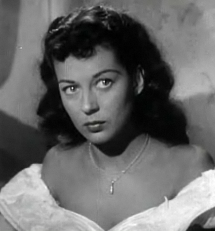
Gail Russell

- Aaron Ruben, television producer and director, The Andy Griffith Show
- Arthur Rubloff, real estate developer (born in Minnesota)
- Jack Ruby, killer of Lee Harvey Oswald
- J. Craig Ruby, basketball coach, Illinois 1922–36 (born in Iowa)
- Dave Rudabaugh, Wild West outlaw
- Ken Rudolph, catcher for four MLB teams
- Kirk Rueter, pitcher for San Francisco Giants 1996–2005
- Rudy Ruettiger, motivational speaker, Notre Dame football player, Rudy
- Red Ruffing, Hall of Fame pitcher, six-time World Series champion with New York Yankees
- Sarah Ruhl, playwright
- Irene Ruhnke, pro baseball player
- Joe Ruklick, Northwestern and NBA player
- Julian Sidney Rumsey, shipping mogul, mayor of Chicago 1861–62 (born in New York)
- Donald Rumsfeld, politician (Republican), secretary of defense, White House Chief of Staff, U.S. representative
- Bobby Rush, politician (Democrat), U.S. representative 1993–2023
- Otis Rush, blues musician (born in Mississippi)
- William A. Rusher, lawyer, columnist, publisher of National Review 1957–88
- Marion Rushing, four-sport athlete for Southern Illinois, NFL linebacker
- Cazzie Russell, member of College Basketball Hall of Fame, player for 1970 NBA champion New York Knicks
- Chuck Russell, director, The Mask, Eraser
- Gail Russell, actress, The Uninvited, Angel and the Badman, Wake of the Red Witch
- Lewis Russell, actor, The Lost Weekend
- Lillian Russell, early 20th-century singer and actress (born in Iowa)
- Mary Doria Russell, novelist
- Pee Wee Russell, jazz clarinetist
- Marty Russo, U.S. representative 1975–93
- William Russo, jazz musician and composer
- Edward B. Rust Jr., CEO of State Farm insurance
- Joe Rutgens, defensive tackle for Washington Redskins 1961–69
- Ann Rutledge, friend of Abraham Lincoln (born in Kentucky)
- Dan Ryan Jr., businessman, president of Cook County Board of Commissioners
- George Ryan, politician (Republican), governor of Illinois 1999–2003, imprisoned 2007
- Howard C. Ryan, judge, Supreme Court of Illinois 1970–90
- Jack Ryan, banker, teacher, Senate candidate vs. Barack Obama
- Jeri Ryan, actress, Star Trek: Voyager, Boston Public, 1989 Miss Illinois
- Jim Ryan, Illinois attorney general 1995–2003
- Rex Ryan, head coach for NFL's New York Jets, Buffalo Bills
- Rob Ryan, defensive coordinator for two-time Super Bowl champion Kansas City Chiefs
- Robert Ryan, actor, The Wild Bunch, The Dirty Dozen, The Set-Up, Crossfire, Bad Day at Black Rock, The Longest Day
- Shawn Ryan, television producer and writer, The Shield, The Unit, Angel
- Gary Rydstrom, film sound designer, seven-time Academy Award winner
- Frank Rydzewski, pro and Notre Dame lineman
- Michael Rye, radio and voice actor
- Jules Rykovich, co-MVP of 1947 Rose Bowl for Illinois (born in Croatia)
- Bob Ryland, tennis player and coach
- Herbert Ryman, animator, helped design Disneyland
- Lou Rymkus, NFL tackle, coach for Houston Oilers
- Miro Rys, professional soccer player (born in Czechoslovakia)
- Marc Rzepczynski, MLB relief pitcher 2009–18

== S ==
Sa–Sb

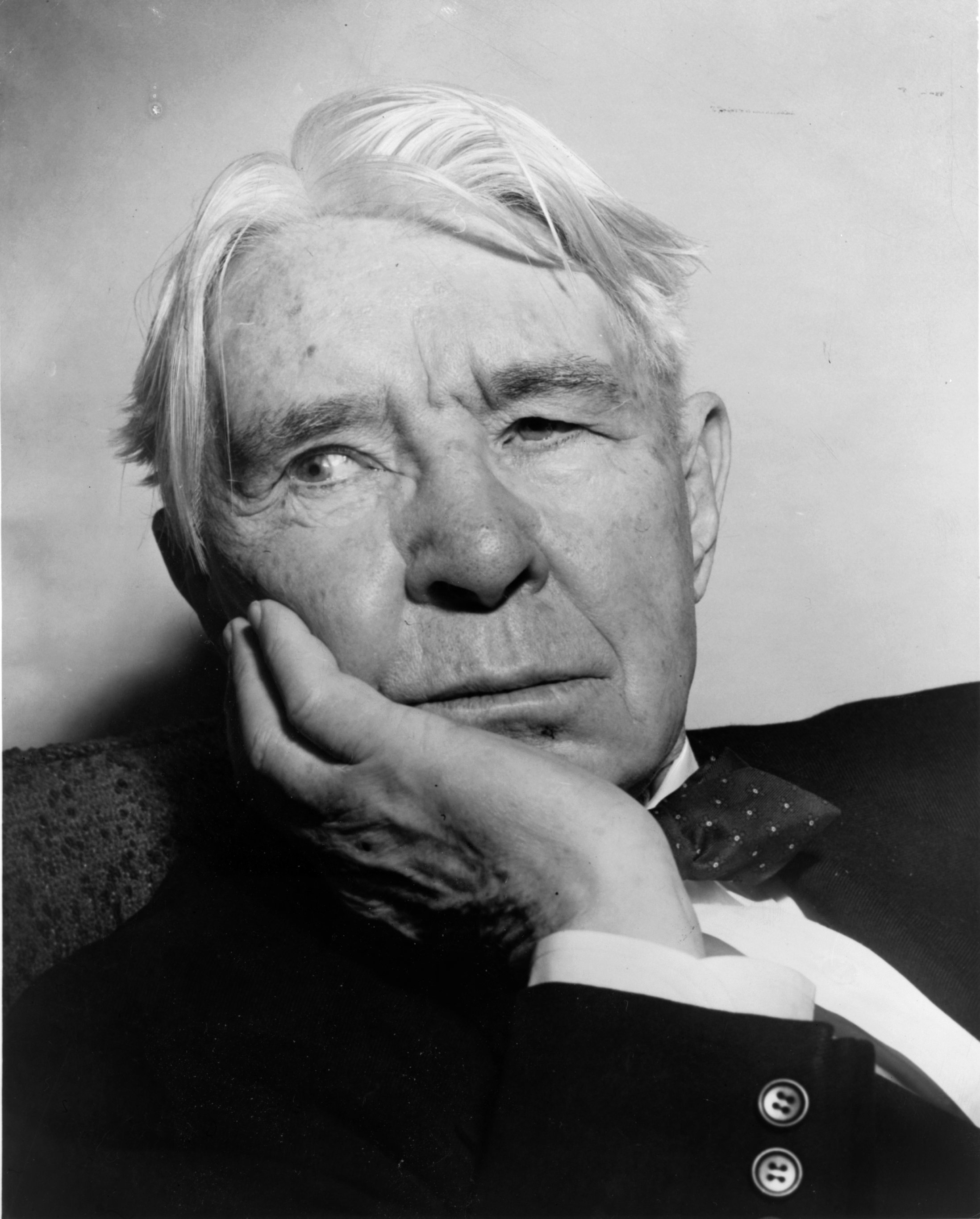
Carl Sandburg

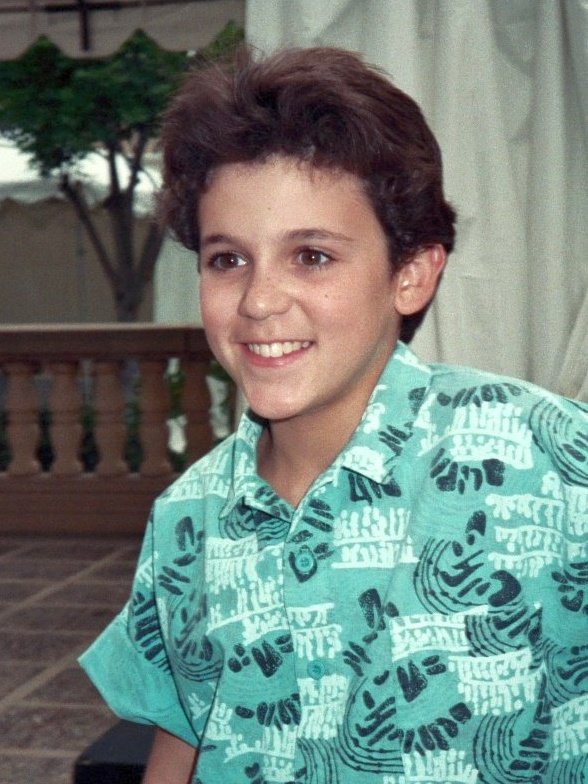
Fred Savage

- Lou Saban, head coach of NFL's Buffalo Bills, Denver Broncos and New England Patriots
- Adolph J. Sabath, politician (Democrat), U.S. representative 1907–52 (born in Czechoslovakia)
- Bret Saberhagen, pitcher for Kansas City Royals, 1985 Cy Young winner and World Series MVP
- Robert Sabonjian, six-term mayor of Waukegan
- Lenny Sachs, head coach of Loyola basketball 1923–42
- Jonathan Sadowski, actor, Live Free or Die Hard, Young & Hungry
- Connor Sadzeck, MLB pitcher
- Craig Sager, sportscaster
- Bernard Sahlins, founder of Second City comedy club
- Susan Saint James, Emmy-winning actress, McMillan & Wife, Kate & Allie, Love at First Bite (born in California)
- Pat Sajak, television personality, host of Wheel of Fortune
- Sol Saks, screenwriter, creator of Bewitched (botn in New York)
- Sheri Salata, president of Oprah Winfrey Network (born in Georgia)
- Chic Sale, actor
- Virginia Sale, actress
- Edward S. Salomon, Civil War general, Chicago alderman, governor of Washington 1870–72 (born in Denmark)
- Jerome Sally, NFL tackle 1982–88
- Waldo Salt, Oscar-winning screenwriter, Midnight Cowboy, Serpico
- Carmen Salvino, bowler, charter member PBA Hall of Fame
- Jeff Salzenstein, tennis player
- Tony Sam, comedian
- Bill Sampen, MLB pitcher 1990–94
- Dave Samuels, musician, Spyro Gyra
- Don Samuelson, governor of Idaho 1967–71
- Ulises Armand Sanabria, television pioneer
- Kiele Sanchez, actress, Married to the Kellys, Related, Lost
- Ryne Sandberg, Hall of Fame infielder for Cubs, manager of Philadelphia Phillies 2013–15 (born in Washington)
- Carl Sandburg, iconic Pulitzer Prize-winning poet and journalist
- Hugh Sanders, actor
- Scott Sanderson, MLB pitcher 1978–96 (born in Michigan)
- Tommy Sands, singer, actor, first husband of Nancy Sinatra
- Jenny Sanford, banker, first lady of South Carolina 2003–10
- George E. Sangmeister, U.S. representative 1989–95, Will County district attorney
- Evelyn Sanguinetti, lieutenant governor 2015–19 (born in Florida)
- Olayinka Sanni, pro basketball player
- David Santee, figure skater, two-time Olympian
- Rick Santelli, editor for CNBC Business News network
- Andrew Santino, comedian, actor, I'm Dying Up Here
- Ron Santo, Hall of Fame third baseman for Cubs and White Sox, radio sportscaster (born in Washington)
- Horatio Sanz, comedian, Saturday Night Live
- Abe Saperstein, owner-coach, Harlem Globetrotters (born in England)
- Lewis Hastings Sarett, chemist and inventor
- Peter Sarsgaard, actor, An Education, Shattered Glass, Kinsey, Orphan, Blue Jasmine, The Batman
- Louis Satterfield, musician with Earth, Wind & Fire
- Doris E. Saunders, librarian and professor
- Red Saunders, drummer (born in Tennessee)
- Warner Saunders, Chicago television newscaster
- Dan Savage, writer, creator of Savage Love
- Fred Savage, actor, director, The Wonder Years, The Princess Bride, Austin Powers in Goldmember
- Randy Savage, professional wrestler
- Ted Savage, outfielder for eight MLB teams
- Matt Savoie, Olympic figure skater
- Eugene Sawyer, Mayor of Chicago 1987–89 (born in Alabama)
- Ken Saydak, blues musician
- Gale Sayers, Hall of Fame running back for Chicago Bears, athletic director at SIU in 1970s (born in Kansas)
- Morgan Saylor, actress, Homeland, Blow the Man Down, Novitiate
- George D. Sax, innovative banker

Sc–Sg

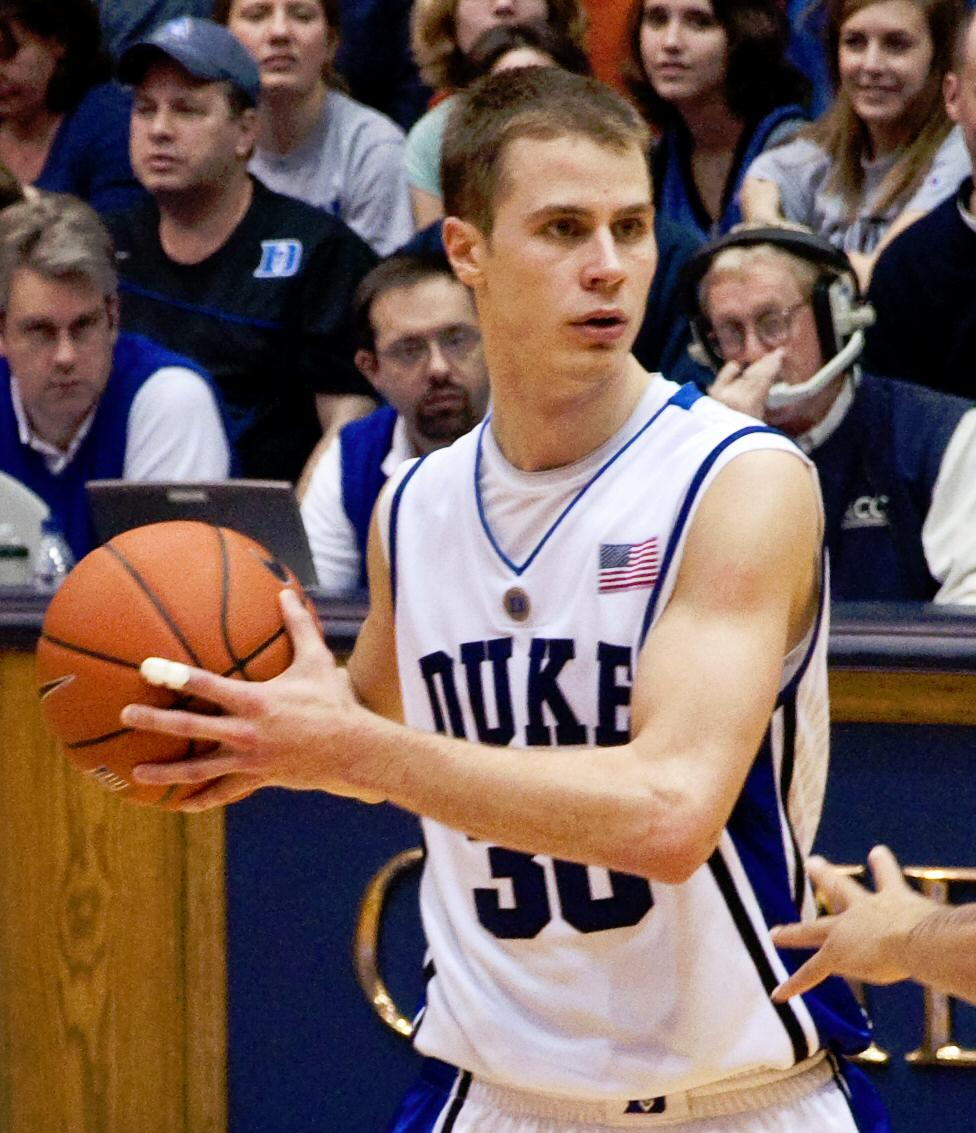
Jon Scheyer

- Joseph Scalise, organized crime figure
- J. Young Scammon, early Chicago settler, banker (born in Maine)
- Richard Schaal, actor, first husband of Valerie Harper
- Wendy Schaal, actress, American Dad!, It's a Living, Fantasy Island
- George Schaefer, Emmy and Tony Award-winning director (born in Connecticut)
- Germany Schaefer, MLB infielder 1901–18
- Johnny Schaive, infielder for Washington Senators 1958–63
- Jan Schakowsky, politician (Democrat), U.S. representative since 1999
- Ray Schalk, Hall of Fame catcher for Chicago White Sox
- Andrew H. Schapiro, ambassador to Czech Republic 2014–17
- Dan Schatzeder, pitcher for nine MLB teams
- Molly Schaus, two-time Olympic hockey silver medalist (born in New Jersey)
- Paul Scheuring, writer-director, Prison Break
- Sharm Scheuerman, basketball player and head coach, Iowa
- Jon Scheyer, basketball player and head coach, Duke
- Claire Schillace, pro baseball player
- Bobby Schilling, U.S. representative 2011–13
- Phyllis Schlafly, conservative activist, author
- Brian Schlitter, pro baseball pitcher
- Fred Schmidt, 1964 Olympic swimming gold medalist
- Harv Schmidt, basketball player and coach at Illinois
- Karl Patterson Schmidt, herpetologist, zoology curator at Chicago Natural History Museum
- Lanny D. Schmidt, chemist, inventor, author, professor
- John Michael Schmitz, pro football center
- Aaron Schock, U.S. representative, resigned from office 2015 (born in Minnesota)
- Red Schoendienst, Hall of Fame second baseman for St. Louis Cardinals and Milwaukee Braves
- Russ Schoene, pro basketball player
- Dana Schoenfield, swimmer, 1972 Olympic silver medalist
- Admiral Schofield, small forward for Washington Wizards (born in England)
- Dick Schofield, MLB infielder for California Angels and Toronto Blue Jays
- Ducky Schofield, MLB infielder 1953–71, member of 1960 World Series champion Pittsburgh Pirates
- Michael Schofield, NFL lineman for Super Bowl 50 champion Denver Broncos
- O'Brien Schofield, NFL linebacker for Super Bowl XLVIII champion Seattle Seahawks (born in South Carolina)
- John Schommer, basketball Hall of Famer, University of Chicago
- Jessy Schram, actress, Falling Skies, Chicago Med
- Avery Schreiber, actor and comedian
- Dorothy Schroeder, pro baseball player
- Leonard W. Schuetz, U.S. representative 1931–44 (born in Germany)
- Fred Schulte, MLB outfielder 1927–37
- Bill Schulz, panelist, producer, Fox's Red Eye w/ Greg Gutfeld
- Don Schulze, MLB pitcher 1983–89
- Arthur Schultz, five-term mayor of Joliet
- Joe Schultz, MLB player and manager
- William Schutz, psychologist
- Fred Schmidt, swimmer, gold and bronze medalist in 1964 Summer Olympics, Navy SEAL
- Tony Schumacher, drag racer, seven-time NHRA champ
- Joseph Schwantner, composer
- Jim Schwantz, NFL linebacker 1992–98, mayor of Palatine
- Ed Schwartz, radio personality
- Frederick Schwatka, U.S. Army lieutenant, noted explorer of northern Canada and Alaska
- Emma Clara Schweer, oldest elected politician
- Gloria Schweigerdt, professional baseball player
- Gerald Schweighart, police officer, Champaign mayor 1999–2011
- Rusty Schwimmer, actress, Twister, The Perfect Storm
- Ignaz Schwinn, founder of bicycle company (born in Germany)
- John T. Scopes, teacher, defendant in Scopes trial (born in Kentucky)
- Thomas N. Scortia, novel adapted as The Towering Inferno
- Bud Scott, jazz musician (born in Louisiana)
- Mark Scott, actor, host of TV's Home Run Derby
- Rick Scott, politician (Republican), governor of Florida 2011–19, U.S. senator
- Stefanie Scott, actress, singer, A.N.T. Farm, Wreck-It Ralph
- Stuart Scott, ESPN sportscaster
- Walter Dill Scott, psychologist, president of Northwestern 1920–39
- Gil Scott-Heron, jazz musician, Grammy Lifetime Achievement Award
- Nancy Scranton, golfer
- Edward Willis Scripps, newspaper publisher, founder of E.W. Scripps Company
- Ellen Browning Scripps, journalist and philanthropist (born in England)
- James E. Scripps, newspaper publisher (born in England)
- Al Sears, saxophonist
- Richard Warren Sears, businessman, co-founder of Sears, Roebuck and Company (born in Minnesota)
- Amy Sedaris, actress and comedian, Strangers with Candy, At Home with Amy Sedaris, BoJack Horseman
- Cody Sedlock, baseball player, 2016 Big Ten Pitcher of the Year
- E.C. Segar, creator of Popeye
- Phil Seghi, general manager of Cleveland Indians 1973–85
- Harry Gordon Selfridge, department store pioneer, founder of Selfridges (born in Wisconsin)
- Rose Buckingham Selfridge, Chicago heiress
- Kevin Seitzer, All-Star third baseman, Atlanta Braves hitting coach
- William Nicholas Selig, motion picture pioneer
- David Seltzer, director and screenwriter, Punchline, Shining Through, Bird on a Wire, The Omen
- James Semple, U.S. senator 1843–47 (born in Kentucky)
- Tony Semple, NFL lineman 1994–2002
- Bill Senn, NFL running back 1926–34
- Danny Seraphine, drummer, Chicago
- Mary Servoss, actress, In This Our Life
- Ike Sewell, pioneer in Chicago-style pizza (born in Texas)
- Mary Foot Seymour, law reporter, businesswoman, school founder, journalist

Sh

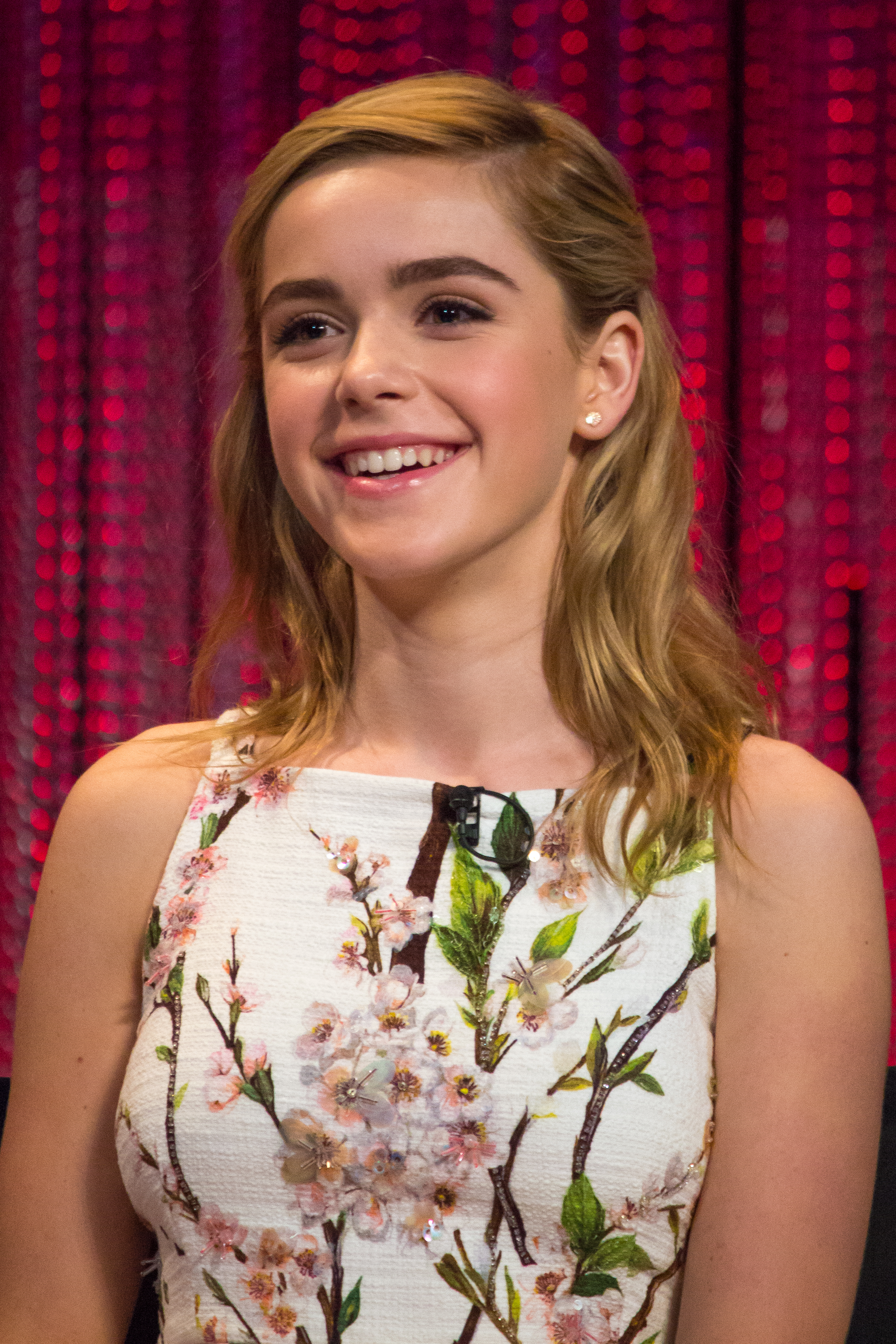
Kiernan Shipka

- Shabbona, 19th-century Native American leader
- Shadows of Knight, rock band from Mt. Prospect
- Dirk Shafer, actor and Playgirl model
- Tom Shales, Pulitzer Prize-winning TV critic
- John Shalikashvili, U.S. Army general, chairman, Joint Chiefs of Staff 1993–97 (born in Poland)
- Ashton C. Shallenberger, governor of Nebraska 1909–11, six-term U.S. representative
- Janet Shamlian, news correspondent for CBS and NBC
- Mike Shanahan, head coach of NFL's Los Angeles Raiders, Denver Broncos, Washington Redskins
- Garry Shandling, comedian and actor, The Larry Sanders Show
- Howie Shanks, MLB outfielder 1912–25
- Michael Shannon, actor, Boardwalk Empire, Take Shelter, Revolutionary Road, Man of Steel (born in Kentucky)
- Terrence Shannon Jr., basketball player, Illinois
- Daniel B. Shapiro, U.S. ambassador to Israel 2011–17
- Mark Shapiro, executive with Endeavor talent agency, Six Flags, ESPN
- Samuel H. Shapiro, lieutenant governor and 1968–69 governor of Illinois
- Shannon Sharpe, NFL tight end 1990–2003, three-time Super Bowl champion, Pro Football Hall of Fame, TV analyst
- Sterling Sharpe, wide receiver, College Football Hall of Fame, Green Bay Packers 1988–94, TV analyst
- Frank Shaughnessy, college football player and coach, pro baseball player and executive
- Bernard Shaw, television journalist for CNN
- Guy L. Shaw, U.S. representative 1921–25
- Howard Van Doren Shaw, architect
- Stan Shaw, actor, The Boys in Company C, The Great Santini, Daylight, Snake Eyes, Harlem Nights
- William Shawn, editor of The New Yorker 1952–1987
- Larry Shay, songwriter, "When You're Smiling"
- John T. Shayne, milliner
- Aaron Shea, NFL tight end 2000–06
- John G. Shedd, president of Marshall Field & Company, philanthropist, founder of Shedd Aquarium (born in New Hampshire)
- Vincent Sheean, war correspondent and author
- Arthur Sheekman, screenwriter, Duck Soup, Some Came Running
- Earl Sheely, 1920s first baseman for White Sox
- Fulton J. Sheen, Roman Catholic archbishop and television personality
- Bernard J. Sheil, Roman Catholic archbishop, founder of CYO
- Edward Sheldon, playwright
- Sidney Sheldon, author, Oscar-winning screenwriter, producer, I Dream of Jeannie, Hart to Hart, Annie Get Your Gun, The Other Side of Midnight
- Derek Shelton, manager of Pittsburgh Pirates
- Sam Shepard, actor, director, Pulitzer Prize-winning playwright, Fool for Love, The Right Stuff, The Pelican Brief, Baby Boom, The Notebook
- Jean Shepherd, radio personality, writer and narrator of A Christmas Story
- Sherri Shepherd, comedian, actress, co-host of The View
- Trent Sherfield, NFL wide receiver
- Jack Sheridan, MLB umpire 1890–1914
- Philip Sheridan, Civil War general, led Great Chicago Fire reconstruction, ran Washington Park Race Track (born in New York)
- Allan Sherman, comedy writer, song parodist
- Alson Sherman, fire chief, Mayor of Chicago 1844–45 (born in Vermont)
- Francis Cornwall Sherman, three-term Mayor of Chicago (born in Connecticut)
- Francis Trowbridge Sherman, Civil War general (born in Connecticut)
- Gene Sherman, Pulitzer Prize-winning journalist
- Lawrence Yates Sherman, lieutenant governor, U.S. senator 1913–21 (born in Ohio)
- Brian Sherwin, art critic, curator, writer
- Brad Sherwood, comedian, Whose Line Is It Anyway?
- James Shields, Irish-born senator of Illinois, Minnesota and Missouri
- Ren Shields, songwriter, "In the Good Old Summer Time"
- Matthew Shiltz, quarterback in CFL
- John Shimkus, politician (Republican), U.S. representative 1997–2021
- Katherine Shindle, actress and 1998 Miss America
- Kiernan Shipka, actress, Sally Draper on Mad Men
- George E. Shipley, U.S. representative 1959–79
- William L. Shirer, war correspondent, historian
- Bernie Shively, All-American guard for Illinois, 1938–67 athletic director at Kentucky
- Twila Shively, pro baseball player
- William Shockley, Nobel Prize-winning physicist, co-inventor of the transistor
- Vaughn Shoemaker, Pulitzer Prize-winning cartoonist
- Lee Sholem, film director, The Redhead from Wyoming, Tarzan and the Slave Girl, Superman and the Mole Men
- Bobby Short, cabaret singer, pianist and recording artist
- Ed Short, executive with Chicago White Sox 1950–70
- Luke Short, novelist
- Rick Short, MLB player and scout
- Gwynne Shotwell, president of SpaceX
- Brian Shouse, MLB pitcher 1993–2009
- Bobby Shriver, activist, writer and California politician
- Maria Shriver, television journalist, author, 2003–11 first lady of California
- David Shulkin, U.S. Secretary of Veterans Affairs
- Richard B. Shull, actor, The Fortune, Unfaithfully Yours
- George P. Shultz, U.S. Secretary of Labor 1969–70, Treasury 1972–74, Secretary of State 1982–89, Chicago professor (born in New York)
- Iman Shumpert, NBA guard 2011–21
- John Shurna, Northwestern basketball all-time leading scorer

Si–Sk

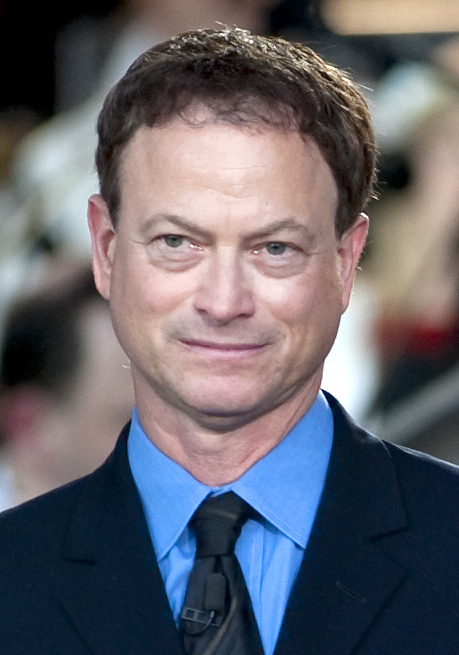
Gary Sinise

- Billy Sianis, founder of Billy Goat Tavern (born in Greece)
- Drew Sidora, actress, That's So Raven
- Thomas Siebel, technology executive, philanthropist
- Don Siegel, film director, Dirty Harry, Charley Varrick, The Shootist, Invasion of the Body Snatchers, Coogan's Bluff
- Jeremy Siegel, professor of finance at Wharton School of the University of Pennsylvania
- Casey Siemaszko, actor, Breaking In, Of Mice and Men, NYPD Blue, Back to the Future parts 1 and 2
- Nina Siemaszko, actress, The West Wing, The American President, License to Drive, Sinatra, Mystery Woman
- Eric Sievers, tight end for San Diego Chargers 1981–90
- Jack Sikma, Hall of Fame center for 1979 NBA champion Seattle SuperSonics
- David Sills, judge, son-in-law of Ronald Reagan
- Paul Sills, original director of The Second City
- Joe Silver, actor, You Light Up My Life, Deathtrap
- Nate Silver, quarterback of first Notre Dame undefeated team, 1903
- Shel Silverstein, cartoonist, screenwriter, author of children's books
- Ken Silvestri, MLB catcher and coach
- Bobby Simmons, guard for five NBA teams
- Jade Simmons, concert pianist, 2000 Miss America runner-up
- Liesel Pritzker Simmons, actress, heiress
- Marty Simmons, basketball coach, Evansville, Eastern Illinois
- Tony Simmons, NFL wide receiver 1998–2002
- Bryan W. Simon, film and stage director
- Paul Simon, politician (Democrat), U.S. senator 1985–97, presidential candidate (born in Oregon)
- Roger Simon, journalist, columnist for Politico
- Scott Simon, program host for National Public Radio
- Sheila Simon, law professor, 2011–15 lieutenant governor
- S. Sylvan Simon, film director and producer, I Love Trouble, The Fuller Brush Man, Born Yesterday
- Carole Simpson, radio and TV journalist
- Diane Simpson-Bundy, two-time Olympian in rhythmic gymnastics
- Edna Oakes Simpson, U.S. representative 1959–61, widow of Sid Simpson
- Sid Simpson, transportation executive, U.S. representative 1943–58
- Will Simpson, Olympic gold medalist in equestrian
- Mike Singletary, Hall of Fame linebacker for Chicago Bears (born in Texas)
- James Singleton, pro basketball player
- Gary Sinise, Golden Globe and Emmy Award-winning actor, director, musician, CSI: NY, Forrest Gump, Apollo 13
- Charlie Siringo, Chicago-based Pinkerton's detective (born in Texas)
- Bob Sirott, radio and TV personality
- Joseph J. Sisco, CIA officer and diplomat
- Gene Siskel, film critic for Chicago Tribune, co-host of Siskel & Ebert
- Sister Jean, chaplain and basketball personality at Loyola
- George Skakel, industrialist, father of Ethel Kennedy
- William V. Skall, Oscar-winning cinematographer
- Bob Skelton, swimmer, 1924 Olympic gold medalist
- Matt Skiba, musician, Blink-182
- Roe Skidmore, 1-for-1 for Cubs in lone MLB at-bat
- Jeffrey Skilling, former president of Enron, convicted of multiple federal felony charges
- Tom Skilling, meteorologist for WGN News
- Cornelia Otis Skinner, actress and author
- Frank Skinner, Oscar-nominated composer
- Jane Skinner, TV journalist, wife of NFL Commissioner Roger Goodell
- Samuel K. Skinner, U.S. secretary of transportation and White House chief of staff for President George H. W. Bush
- Lou Skizas, MLB outfielder 1956–59
- Peter Skoronski, offensive lineman for Northwestern, 11th pick of 2023 NFL draft
- Tony Skoronski, jockey
- Bill "Moose" Skowron, MLB first baseman, five World Series championships with New York Yankees
- Victor Skrebneski, photographer

Sl–Sn

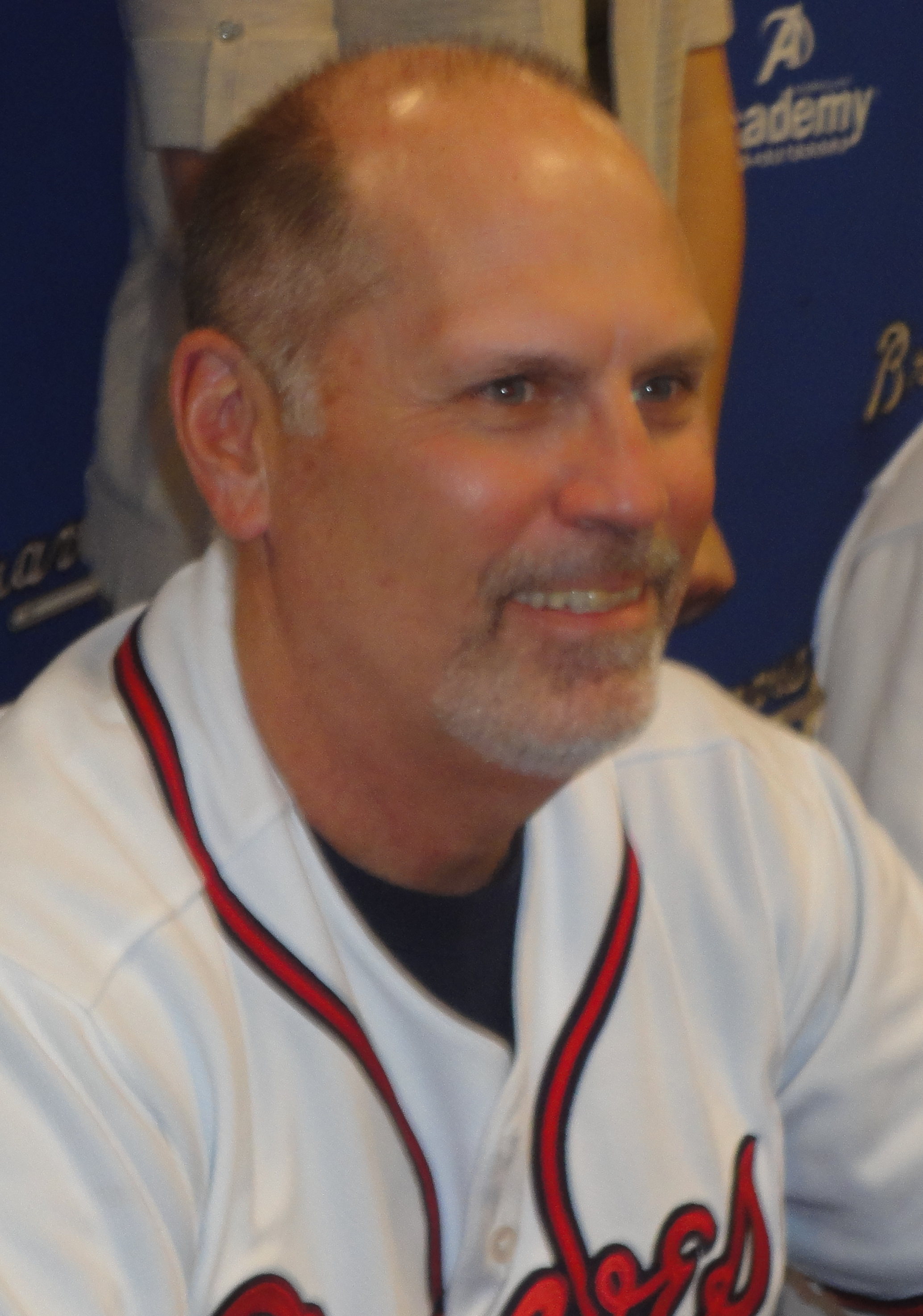
Brian Snitker

- Jack Slade, gunfighter, Pony Express rider
- Duke Slater, NFL tackle and College Football Hall of Famer
- John Slater, physicist
- James M. Slattery, U.S. Senate appointee
- Chris Slayton, NFL defensive end
- Martha Sleeper, actress, Spitfire, The Bells of St. Mary's
- Grace Slick, lead singer of Jefferson Airplane, Jefferson Starship, composer of "White Rabbit"
- Blake Sloan, NHL winger 1999–2004
- Jerry Sloan, NBA All-Star player and coach for Chicago Bulls, coach of Utah Jazz, member of Hall of Fame
- Gabriel Slonina, pro soccer goalkeeper
- Jeff Sluman, pro golfer (born in New York)
- Albion W. Small, sociologist and university professor (born in Maine)
- Len Small, state treasurer and 1921–29 governor of Illinois
- Mike Small, pro golfer and coach
- The Smashing Pumpkins, rock band from Chicago
- Anne Smedinghoff, diplomat killed in Afghanistan
- Ralph C. Smedley, founder of Toastmasters International
- Jack Smiley, basketball player for Illinois
- Adrian Smith, architect of Chicago's Trump Tower and Dubai's Burj Khalifa (world's tallest building)
- Al Smith, basketball player in ABA 1971–75
- Al Smith, MLB pitcher 1934–45
- Art Smith, actor, In a Lonely Place, Ride the Pink Horse, Body and Soul
- Eleanor Sophia Smith, composer, educator
- Frank L. Smith, U.S. representative 1919–21
- Giles Alexander Smith, Civil War general, politician (born in New York)
- H. Allen Smith, journalist and humorist, Rhubarb
- Hal Smith, MLB catcher 1955–64, played for 1960 World Series champion Pittsburgh Pirates
- Hamilton O. Smith, microbiologist, 1978 Nobel Prize (born in New York)
- Harry Smith, television news journalist
- Henry Justin Smith, editor of Chicago Daily News
- Jack Smith, MLB outfielder 1915–29
- Jim Smith, wide receiver, won two Super Bowls with Pittsburgh Steelers
- John C. Smith, Civil War general, politician (born in Pennsylvania)
- John E. Smith, Civil War general, jeweler (born in Switzerland)
- Joseph Smith, founder of Latter Day Saint movement (born in Vermont)
- Kellita Smith, actress and model, The Bernie Mac Show
- Lenzelle Smith Jr., player in Israel Basketball Premier League
- Lonnie Smith, MLB outfielder, three-time World Series champion
- Lovie Smith, head coach of Chicago Bears 2004–12, Illinois 2016–20 (born in Texas)
- Lyall Smith, sports editor and executive
- Patti Smith, singer, songwriter and poet, Rock and Roll Hall of Fame
- Pinetop Smith, jazz pianist (born in Alabama)
- Ralph Tyler Smith, completed U.S. Senate term of Everett Dirksen
- Ron Smith, defensive back for five NFL teams
- Sally Smith, mayor of Juneau, Alaska 2000–03
- Sandra Smith, reporter for Fox Business Network
- Sidney Smith, cartoonist
- Tangela Smith, WNBA player 1998–2012, 2007 and 2009 champion
- Theophilus W. Smith, law partner of Aaron Burr, impeached Illinois Supreme Court justice (born in New York)
- Wendell Smith, sportswriter (born in Michigan)
- Olivia Smoliga, swimmer, NCAA champion and Olympic gold medalist
- Jake Smolinski, outfielder for Oakland A's
- Henry Snapp, U.S. representative 1871–73 (born in New York)
- Howard M. Snapp, U.S. representative 1903–11 (born in New York)
- Phoebe Snetsinger, bird watcher
- Brian Snitker, manager for Atlanta Braves, won 2021 World Series
- Carrie Snodgress, Oscar-nominated actress, Diary of a Mad Housewife, The Fury, Murphy's Law, Pale Rider
- Esther Snyder, co-founder of In-N-Out Burger
- Franklyn Bliss Snyder, president of Northwestern University 1939–49
- Jimmy Snyder, auto racer, runner-up in 1939 Indianapolis 500
- Martin Snyder, gangster, husband of Ruth Etting
- Ted Snyder, songwriter, "Who's Sorry Now?"

So–Ss

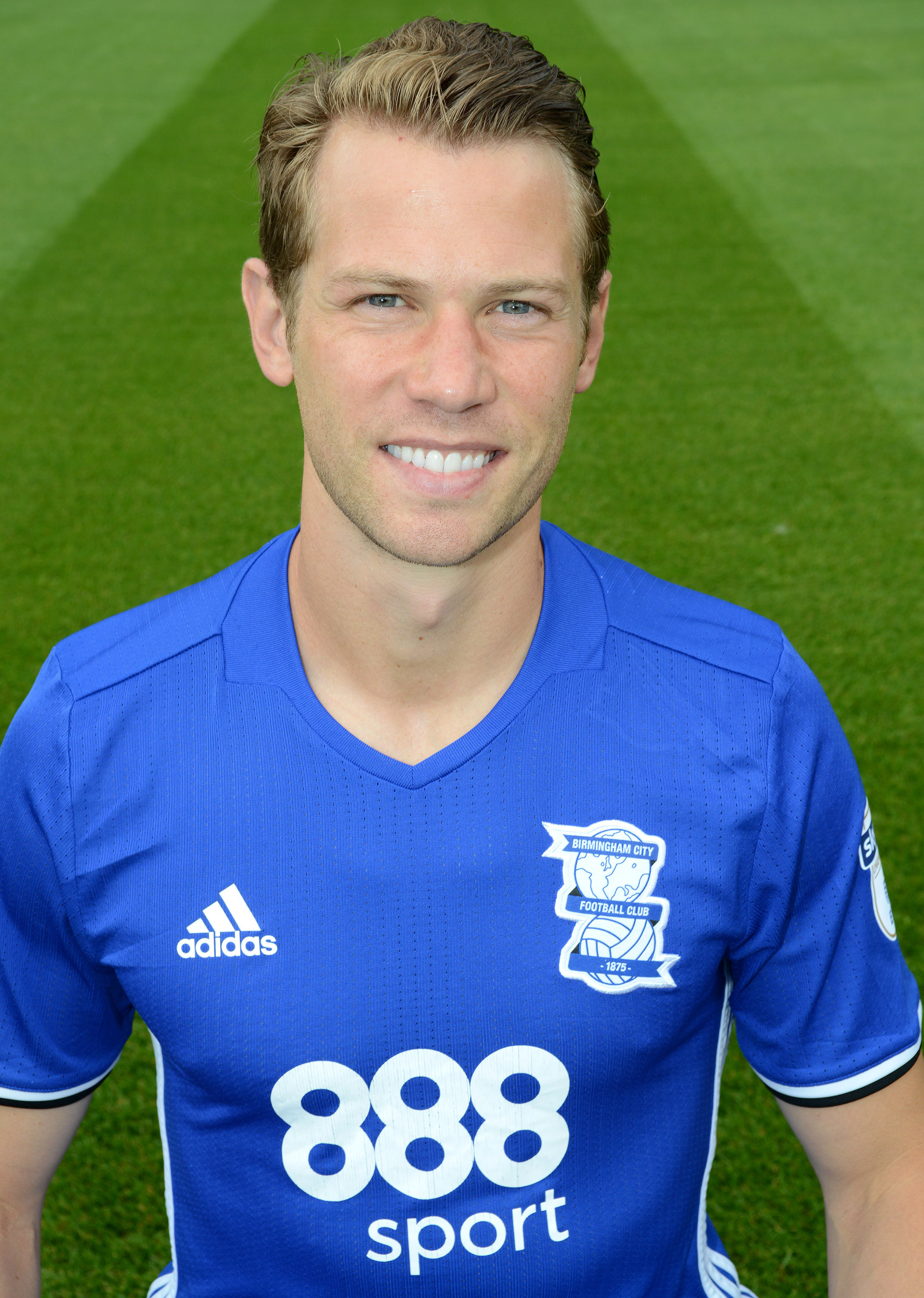
Jonathan Spector

- Carol Sobieski, screenwriter, Annie, Fried Green Tomatoes, Casey's Shadow, Sarah, Plain and Tall
- Ron Sobie, basketball player for DePaul, New York Knicks
- Nick Solak, pro baseball player
- Susan Solomon, chemist, MIT professor, Nobel Prize winner
- Joey Soloway, TV and film writer, director
- Georg Solti, conductor of Chicago Symphony Orchestra 1969–91 (born in Hungary)
- Rafael Sorkin, physicist
- Sammy Sosa, outfielder for White Sox and Cubs 1989–2004 (born in Dominican Republic)
- Elliot Soto, pro baseball infielder
- David Soul, actor, Starsky and Hutch, Here Come the Brides, The Yellow Rose; singer, "Don't Give Up on Us"
- Olan Soule, actor
- Soulja Boy, rapper
- Eddie South, jazz violinist (born in Missouri)
- Pete Souza, official White House photographer for Presidents Reagan and Obama (born in Massachusetts)
- Judy Sowinski, skater in roller derby
- Brock Spack, football coach, Illinois State
- Vince Spadea, tennis player
- Horatio Spafford, lawyer, hymn composer (born in New York)
- Sarah Spain, sports journalist (born in Ohio)
- Albert Spalding, athlete, co-founder of Spalding sporting goods
- John Spalding, Roman Catholic Bishop and co-founder of The Catholic University of America
- William A.J. Sparks, U.S. Representative 1875–83 (born in Indiana)
- Graham Spanier, president of Penn State University 1995–2011 (born in South Africa)
- Muggsy Spanier, jazz musician
- Otis Spann, pianist in Blues Hall of Fame (born in Mississippi)
- Garret Sparks, pro hockey goaltender
- Jeff Speakman, martial artist, actor, The Perfect Weapon
- Richard Speck, mass murderer
- Dave Spector, Japan television personality
- Jonathan Spector, soccer player for Birmingham City F.C.
- Mac Speedie, wide receiver for Cleveland Browns 1946–52, head coach for Denver Broncos 1964–66
- Donald Spero, physicist, Olympic rower
- Lawrence Sperry, aviation pioneer
- August Spies, convicted anarchist of Haymarket affair (born in Germany)
- Ed Spiezio, infielder for St. Louis Cardinals and San Diego Padres
- Scott Spiezio, infielder for four Major League teams; 2002, 2006 World Series champion
- Anthony Spilotro, mobster and enforcer for Chicago Outfit
- Alfred Henry Spink, founder of The Sporting News (born in Canada)
- Scipio Spinks, MLB pitcher 1969–73
- Jim Spivey, middle-distance runner, three-time Olympian
- Paul Splittorff, pitcher for Kansas City Royals 1970–84 (born in Indiana)
- Erik Spoelstra, head coach for two-time NBA champion Miami Heat
- Viola Spolin, drama and improv teacher
- George Kirke Spoor, film industry pioneer
- Jerry Springer, Chicago-based TV personality (born in England)
- William L. Springer, U.S. Representative 1951–73
- William M. Springer, U.S. Representative 1875–95 (born in Indiana)
- Ed Sprinkle, Hall of Fame end for Chicago Bears (born in Texas)
- June Squibb, Oscar-nominated actress, Nebraska, About Schmidt

Sta–Std

- Dewayne Staats, sportscaster (born in Missouri)
- Brian Stack, comedy writer
- Eddie Stack, MLB pitcher 1910–14
- Jim Stack, NBA executive, two-time Northwestern MVP
- Marv Staehle, infielder for Chicago White Sox 1964–67
- Jimmy Stafford, lead guitarist for Train
- Michelle Stafford, actress, The Young and the Restless
- Amos Alonzo Stagg, College Hall of Fame football coach and athlete, creator of the lateral pass and helmet
- Amos Alonzo Stagg Jr., college football player and coach
- Paul Stagg, college football player and coach
- Jake Stahl, MLB player and manager, 1912 World Series
- Larry Stahl, outfielder for four MLB teams
- Michael Stahl-David, actor, The Black Donnellys, Cloverfield
- A.E. Staley, food mogul, founder of football's Decatur Staleys (who became Chicago Bears)
- Harry Staley, MLB pitcher 1888–95
- Kevin Stallings, basketball coach, Illinois State, Vanderbilt
- Dino Stamatopoulos, comedy writer, actor, producer
- Lee Stange, pitcher for four MLB teams
- Don Stanhouse, pitcher for four MLB teams
- Pete Stanicek, MLB player
- Steve Stanicek, MLB player
- Aileen Stanley, early 20th-century singer
- Dolph Stanley, basketball coach
- Florence Stanley, actress, Fiddler on the Roof, Fish
- Louise Stanley, actress, Sky Bandits, Yukon Flight
- Walter Stanley, NFL wide receiver
- The Staple Singers, gospel group, Grammy Lifetime Achievement Award
- Mavis Staples, gospel singer, 2017 Blues Hall of Fame inductee
- Tim Stapleton, NHL center 2008–12
- Ellen Gates Starr, social reformer and co-founder of Hull House
- Helen Ekin Starrett, president, Illinois Woman's Press Association
- Vincent Starrett, early 20th-century journalist
- Todd Stashwick, actor, The Riches
- Harry Statham, college basketball coach
- Jigger Statz, MLB outfielder 1919–28

Ste–Stn

- Jack Steadman, president, general manager of NFL's Kansas City Chiefs 1960–89
- Steamboat Willie, Dixieland jazz musician
- Myrtle Stedman, singer and actress
- Claude Steele, provost at Columbia, University of California
- Dan Steele, two-time Olympian in bobsled, NCAA champion hurdler
- Shelby Steele, columnist, documentary filmmaker, author of White Guilt
- Miriam Steever, pro tennis player
- Walter Steffen, All-American quarterback, University of Chicago
- Cindy Stein, women's basketball coach, Missouri and Southern Illinois
- James R. Stein, TV writer and producer, America 2-Night, Fernwood 2 Night, Son of the Beach
- Jill Stein, physician, activist, Green Party politician
- Eric Steinbach, NFL offensive lineman 2003–12
- Jack Steinberger, physicist, Nobel Prize winner
- Ruth Ann Steinhagen, shot ballplayer Eddie Waitkus, inspired The Natural
- John Henry Stelle, lieutenant governor 1937–40, briefly governor of Illinois
- Rick Stelmaszek, catcher and bullpen coach for Minnesota Twins
- Marilee Stepan, swimmer, 1952 Olympic bronze medalist
- Donald Stephens, 13-term mayor of Rosemont
- Michael Stephens, pro soccer player
- Benjamin Stephenson, militia commander, writer of state constitution (born in Pennsylvania)
- Donald Sterling, owned Los Angeles Clippers 1981–2014
- John Allen Sterling, U.S. representative 1903–18
- Thomas Sterling, Springfield attorney, U.S. senator of South Dakota 1913–25 (born in Ohio)
- Lee Stern, six-decade member of Chicago Board of Trade, founder-president of Chicago Sting pro soccer
- Dutch Sternaman, football player, co-owner of Decatur Staleys (who became Chicago Bears)
- Joey Sternaman, 1920s pro football quarterback
- Dodie Stevens, singer, "Pink Shoe Laces"
- Fisher Stevens, actor, producer, director, Early Edition, Short Circuit, Stand Up Guys, Succession
- John Paul Stevens, attorney, Supreme Court justice 1975–2010, third-longest tenure in court's history
- Adlai Stevenson I, Illinois congressman, U.S. postmaster general, 23rd vice president of the United States 1893–97 (born in Kentucky)
- Adlai Stevenson II, attorney, politician (Democrat) governor of Illinois, ambassador to the United Nations, presidential candidate in 1952 and 1956 (born in California)
- Adlai Stevenson III, politician (Democrat), congressman and U.S. senator from Illinois 1970–81
- Lewis Stevenson, Illinois secretary of state 1914–17, father of Adlai Stevenson II
- McLean Stevenson, actor, M*A*S*H, Hello, Larry
- William Stevenson, Olympic gold medalist, college president, ambassador
- Brock Stewart, MLB pitcher
- Helen J. Stewart, pioneer, postmaster of Las Vegas
- Jacqueline Stewart, professor, Turner Classic Movies personality
- James B. Stewart, journalist, 1988 Pulitzer Prize
- Lynn D. Stewart, lineman for Illinois in 1964 Rose Bowl, co-founder of Hooters restaurants
- Gabrella Townley Stickney (1850–1942), compositor, postmaster, and temperance advocate
- David Ogden Stiers, actor, orchestral conductor; M*A*S*H, The Dead Zone, Doc Hollywood, Better Off Dead
- Isaiah Stillman, militia commander, Black Hawk War (born in Massachusetts)
- Darryl Stingley, NFL receiver, left quadriplegic by injury
- Howard St. John, actor, Born Yesterday, Li'l Abner, One, Two, Three

Sto–Stz

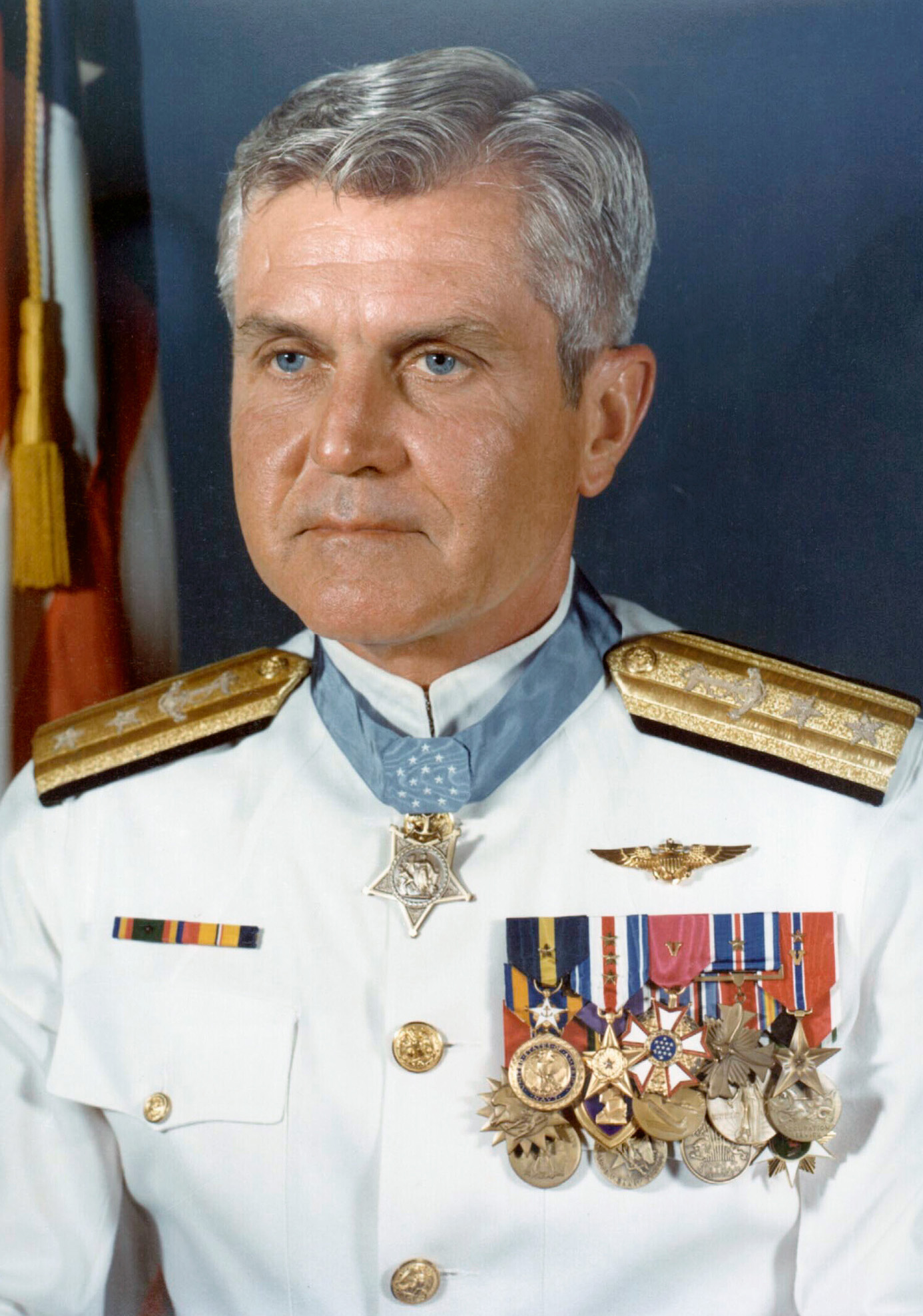
James Stockdale

- Barbara Stock, actress, Spenser: For Hire
- Frederick Stock, 37-year director of Chicago Symphony Orchestra (born in Germany)
- Milt Stock, MLB third baseman 1913–26
- James Stockdale, one of U.S. Navy's most highly decorated officers, 1992 vice-presidential candidate
- Dejan Stojanović, poet, writer, essayist (born in Serbia)
- Johnny Stompanato, gangster, killed by daughter of Lana Turner
- Cynthia Stone, actress, wife of Jack Lemmon
- Dean Stone, pitcher for six MLB teams
- Melville E. Stone, publisher, founder of Chicago Daily News, manager of Associated Press
- Steve Stone, pitcher and broadcaster, Cubs and White Sox (born in Ohio)
- W. Clement Stone, philanthropist, self-help author
- Steve Stonebreaker, NFL linebacker 1962–68
- Bill Stoneman, MLB pitcher 1967–74, general manager of Los Angeles Angels 1999–2007
- Wilbur F. Storey, journalist (born in Vermont)
- Hannah Storm, ESPN sportscaster
- Lauren Storm, actress, Flight 29 Down
- John Stossel, consumer reporter, investigative journalist, author
- Jean Stothert, mayor of Omaha, Nebraska
- Eric Stout, MLB pitcher
- Shirley Stovroff, pro baseball player
- Otto Stowe, NFL wide receiver 1971–74
- Michael Stoyanov, actor, TV comedy writer, Blossom
- Win Stracke, folk musician
- Hank Stram, Pro Football Hall of Fame coach of Kansas City Chiefs
- Juliana Stratton, lawyer, lieutenant governor
- William Stratton, politician (Republican), governor of Illinois 1953–61
- Michael W. Straus, editor, director of U.S. reclamation under Harry Truman
- The Brothers Strause, directing duo, special effects artists
- Kevin Streelman, pro golfer
- Tai Streets, Michigan football and basketball player, San Francisco 49ers wide receiver
- Chris Streveler, quarterback of 2019 CFL champion Winnipeg Blue Bombers
- Steve Stricker, pro golfer, University of Illinois player (born in Wisconsin)
- Lee Strobel, Christian apologetic author
- John Stroger, president of Cook County Commissioners 1994–2006
- Cal Strong, Olympic water polo medalist
- Cecily Strong, comedian, Saturday Night Live
- Robert H. Strotz, economist, Northwestern University president 1970–84
- Max Strus, basketball player for DePaul, Miami Heat, Cleveland Cavaliers
- Barbara Stuart, television actress
- John Stuart, CEO of Quaker Oats 1922–53
- John T. Stuart, law partner of Abe Lincoln, U.S. Representative (born in Kentucky)
- R. Douglas Stuart, U.S. ambassador to Canada
- R. Douglas Stuart Jr., executive of Quaker Oats, ambassador to Norway
- Andy Studebaker, NFL linebacker 2008–15
- Quint Studer, healthcare entrepreneur
- Mary Lou Studnicka, player in All-American Girls Baseball League
- James J. Stukel, university president
- Patrick Stump, lead singer of band Fall Out Boy
- John Sturges, Oscar-nominated film director, The Magnificent Seven, Gunfight at the O.K. Corral, The Great Escape
- Preston Sturges, director and Oscar-winning screenwriter, The Lady Eve, Sullivan's Travels, The Miracle of Morgan's Creek

Su–Sz

- Todd Sucherman, drummer for Styx
- Bill Sudakis, infielder for six Major League teams
- Margaret Ashmore Sudduth, educator, editor, social reformer
- Harry Sukman, Oscar-winning composer
- Billy Sullivan Jr., MLB catcher 1931–47
- Brad Sullivan, actor, Slap Shot, The Prince of Tides
- Gerry Sullivan, offensive lineman for Cleveland Browns 1974–81
- Joe Sullivan, MLB pitcher 1935–41
- Louis Sullivan, architect (born in Massachusetts)
- McKey Sullivan, fashion model, winner of America’s Next Top Model Cycle 11
- Mike Sullivan, NFL lineman and coach
- Hope Summers, actress, The Andy Griffith Show
- Jessie Sumner, U.S. Representative 1939–47
- Billy Sunday, ballplayer and evangelist (born in Iowa)
- Helen Thompson Sunday, evangelist
- Jim Sundberg, MLB catcher 1974–89, six Gold Glove Awards
- Eliza R. Sunderland, writer, educator, lecturer, women's rights advocate
- Don Sundquist, governor of Tennessee 1995–2003
- Daniel Sunjata, actor, Rescue Me, Law & Order: Special Victims Unit, The Devil Wears Prada
- Tom Sunkel, MLB pitcher 1937–44
- Brent Suter, MLB pitcher
- Jack Suwinski, MLB outfielder
- Evar Swanson, MLB outfielder 1929–34
- Gloria Swanson, Oscar-nominated, Golden Globe-winning actress, Sunset Boulevard, The Trespasser, Airport 1975
- Gladys Swarthout, opera singer (born in Missouri)
- Aaron Swartz, computer programmer, writer
- Ed Sweeney, MLB catcher 1908–1919
- Blanche Sweet, actress, Anna Christie
- Lynn Sweet, Washington bureau chief, Chicago Sun-Times
- Nancy Swider-Peltz, speed skater, four-time Olympian
- George Bell Swift, two-term Mayor of Chicago (born in Ohio)
- Gustavus Franklin Swift, meat-packing entrepreneur, founder of Swift & Co. (born in Massachusetts)
- Bob Swisher, running back for Chicago Bears 1938–41
- Ann Swisshelm, 2014 Olympian in curling
- Carl Switzer, actor, "Alfalfa" in Our Gang comedies
- Ken Swofford, actor, Ellery Queen, Murder, She Wrote
- Keith Szarabajka, actor, The Dark Knight, We Were Soldiers
- Stan Szukala, pro basketball player

== T ==
Ta–Tg

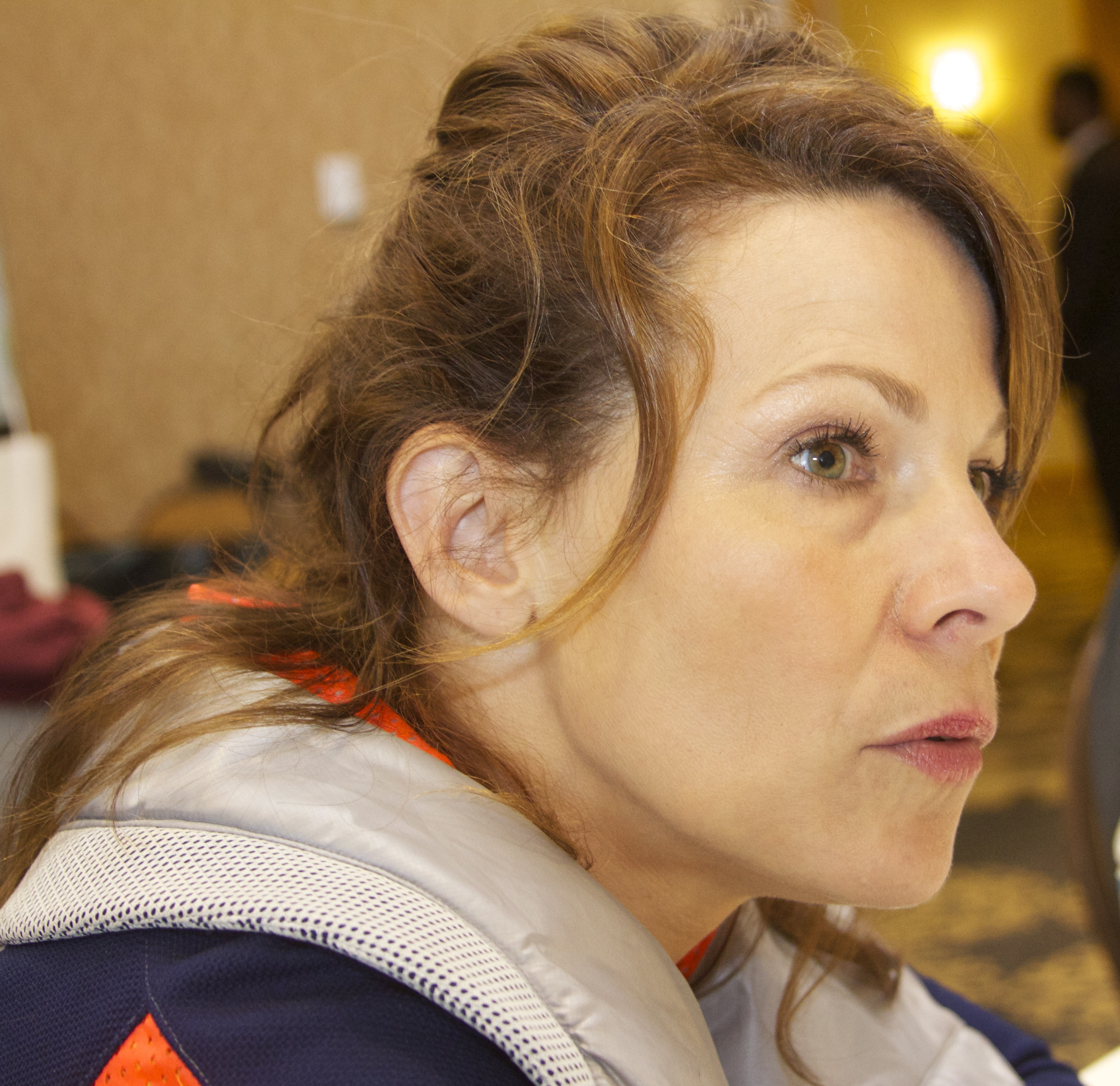
Lili Taylor

- Jerry Taft, WLS-TV meteorologist
- Lorado Taft, sculptor
- Joe Tait, sportscaster for Cleveland Cavaliers
- Carlos Talbott, U.S. Air Force general
- Maria Tallchief, ballerina, Chicago Lyric Opera director (born in Oklahoma)
- Jill Talley, actress, Little Miss Sunshine, The Boondocks, SpongeBob SquarePants
- Shel Talmy, 1960s record producer, songwriter, arranger
- Tampa Red, musician in Blues Hall of Fame (born in Georgia)
- Daniel M. Tani, astronaut (born in Pennsylvania)
- Bazy Tankersley, horse breeder and publisher
- Antwon Tanner, actor, One Tree Hill
- John Riley Tanner, governor of Illinois 1897–1901 (born in Indiana)
- Joseph R. Tanner, astronaut
- Alex Tanney, NFL quarterback and coach
- Dorothea Tanning, artist
- Lawrence Tanter, public address announcer, Los Angeles Lakers
- El Tappe, catcher and coach for Chicago Cubs
- Bill Tate, MVP of 1952 Rose Bowl, head coach at Wake Forest
- Larenz Tate, actor, Dead Presidents, Menace II Society, Why Do Fools Fall in Love, Ray, The Postman
- Mark Tatge, journalist
- Mike Tauchman, MLB outfielder
- Norman Taurog, director of Martin and Lewis, Elvis Presley films
- Bert Leston Taylor, librettist and columnist (born in Massachusetts)
- Billy Taylor, basketball coach, Lehigh, Ball State, Elon
- Eddie Taylor, guitarist in Blues Hall of Fame (born in Mississippi)
- Edmund Dick Taylor, coal miner, politician, "father of the greenback" (born in Virginia)
- George A. Taylor, World War II general, led Omaha Beach landing
- Hawk Taylor, catcher for four MLB teams
- Joan Taylor, actress, 20 Million Miles to Earth, War Paint, The Rifleman
- Josh Taylor, actor, Days of Our Lives
- June Taylor, choreographer, The Jackie Gleason Show
- Koko Taylor, singer (born in Tennessee)
- Lili Taylor, actress, Six Feet Under, I Shot Andy Warhol, Mystic Pizza, Ransom, The Conjuring
- Robert Lewis Taylor, author, 1959 Pulitzer Prize
- Samuel A. Taylor, screenwriter, Sabrina, Vertigo
- Margaret Taylor-Burroughs, artist, museum founder, parks commissioner (born in Louisiana)
- Edwin Way Teale, naturalist and Pulitzer Prize-winning writer
- Gus Tebell, football coach, NC State, Virginia
- Barbara Ann Teer, founder of National Black Theatre
- John Teerlinck, NFL player and assistant coach, three-time Super Bowl champion (born in New York)
- Len Teeuws, lineman for NFL's Rams and Cardinals
- Rick Telander, sportswriter for Sports Illustrated and Chicago Sun-Times
- William Telford, mayor of Springfield 1971–79
- Lance Ten Broeck, pro golfer
- Andy Tennant, actor, writer, director, Hitch, Sweet Home Alabama, The Bounty Hunter
- Bradie Tennell, figure skater, 2018 Winter Olympics medalist
- Judy Tenuta, comedian
- Studs Terkel, historian, journalist, Pulitzer Prize-winning author and actor, Eight Men Out
- Ernie Terrell, heavyweight contender, Chicago boxing promoter (born in Mississippi)
- Felisha Terrell, actress, Days of Our Lives
- Jean Terrell, singer with The Supremes
- Frank Teschemacher, jazz musician (born in Missouri)
- Tim Tetrick, harness racing driver, won 2012 Hambletonian Stakes

Th–Tn

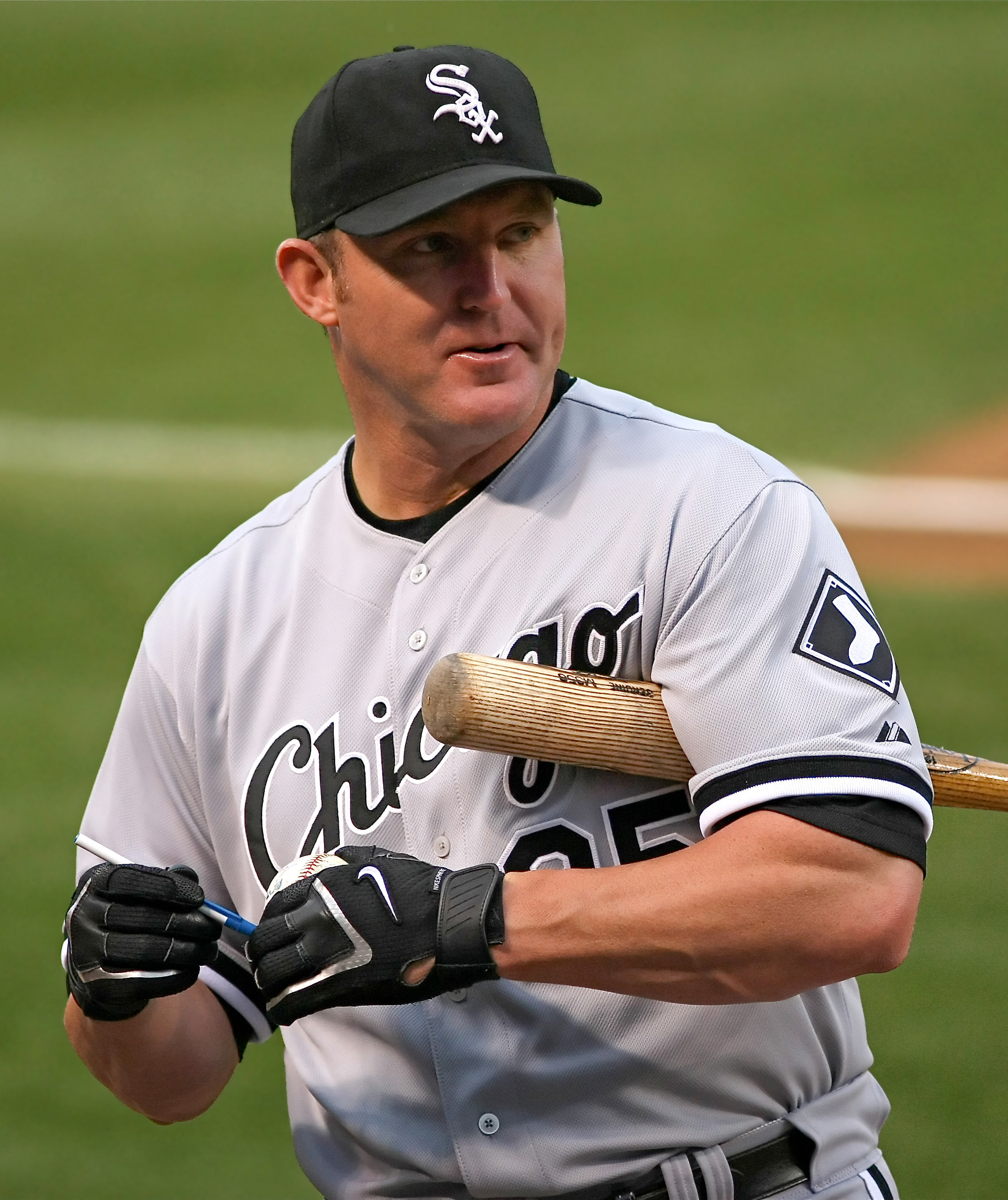
Jim Thome

- John Thain, CEO of Merrill Lynch, New York Stock Exchange
- Tom Thayer, offensive lineman and radio commentator for Chicago Bears
- Mary Jane Theis, Chief Justice, Supreme Court of Illinois
- Lynne Thigpen, actress, Where in the World Is Carmen Sandiego?, All My Children, The Paper, The District
- Roy Thinnes, actor, The Invaders, Airport 1975, The Hindenburg, Falcon Crest
- Napoleon B. Thistlewood, Cairo politician (born in Delaware)
- Josh Thole, MLB catcher 2009–16
- Bill Thomas, costume designer, 10 Oscar nominations
- Deon Thomas, American-Israeli basketball player
- Frank Thomas, Hall of Fame first baseman, DH for Chicago White Sox (born in Georgia)
- Frazier Thomas, Chicago television personality (born in Indiana)
- Isiah Thomas, Hall of Fame basketball player, coach, executive; NCAA champion Indiana, NBA champion Detroit Pistons
- Jesse B. Thomas, one of state's first U.S. senators (born in Virginia)
- Lee Thomas, MLB player and executive
- Pierre Thomas, running back for Super Bowl XLIV champion New Orleans Saints
- Pinch Thomas, MLB catcher 1912–21
- Robert R. Thomas, justice on Supreme Court of Illinois 2000–20, Notre Dame and Bears kicker (born in New York)
- Theodore Thomas, violinist, conductor and founder of the Chicago Symphony Orchestra (born in Germany)
- Jim Thome, Hall of Fame first baseman, DH 1991–2012, five-time All-Star
- Don Thompson, president of McDonald's 2012–15
- Fountain L. Thompson, U.S. senator of North Dakota
- James R. Thompson, politician (Republican), U.S. attorney and four-term governor of Illinois
- Jeri Kehn Thompson, political commentator, wife of Sen. Fred Thompson (born in Nebraska)
- Junior Thompson, MLB pitcher 1939–47
- Marshall Thompson, actor, Dial 1119, Crashout, My Six Convicts, To Hell and Back, It!, First Man into Space
- Patricia Thompson, television and documentary producer
- William Hale Thompson, politician (Republican), two-term mayor of Chicago (born in Massachusetts)
- James Thomson, developmental biologist
- Brad Thor, thriller novelist
- Skip Thoren, basketball center for Illinois 1962–65
- Don Thorp, defensive lineman, 1983 Big Ten MVP
- Noble Threewitt, horse racing trainer
- Richard Threlkeld, television journalist (born in Iowa)
- Paul Tibbets, pilot of Enola Gay, U.S. Air Force general
- Eunice Tietjens, foreign correspondent
- Pamela Tiffin, actress, One, Two, Three, The Pleasure Seekers, Harper (born in Oklahoma)
- Charles Tillman, cornerback for Chicago Bears, Carolina Panthers
- Dorothy Tillman, Chicago alderman 1985–2007 (born in Alabama)
- Burr Tillstrom, puppeteer, creator of Kukla, Fran and Ollie
- Tom Timmermann, MLB pitcher 1969–74
- Joe Tinker, Hall of Fame shortstop for Chicago Cubs (born in Kansas)
- Michael L. Tipsord, chairman of State Farm

To–Tq

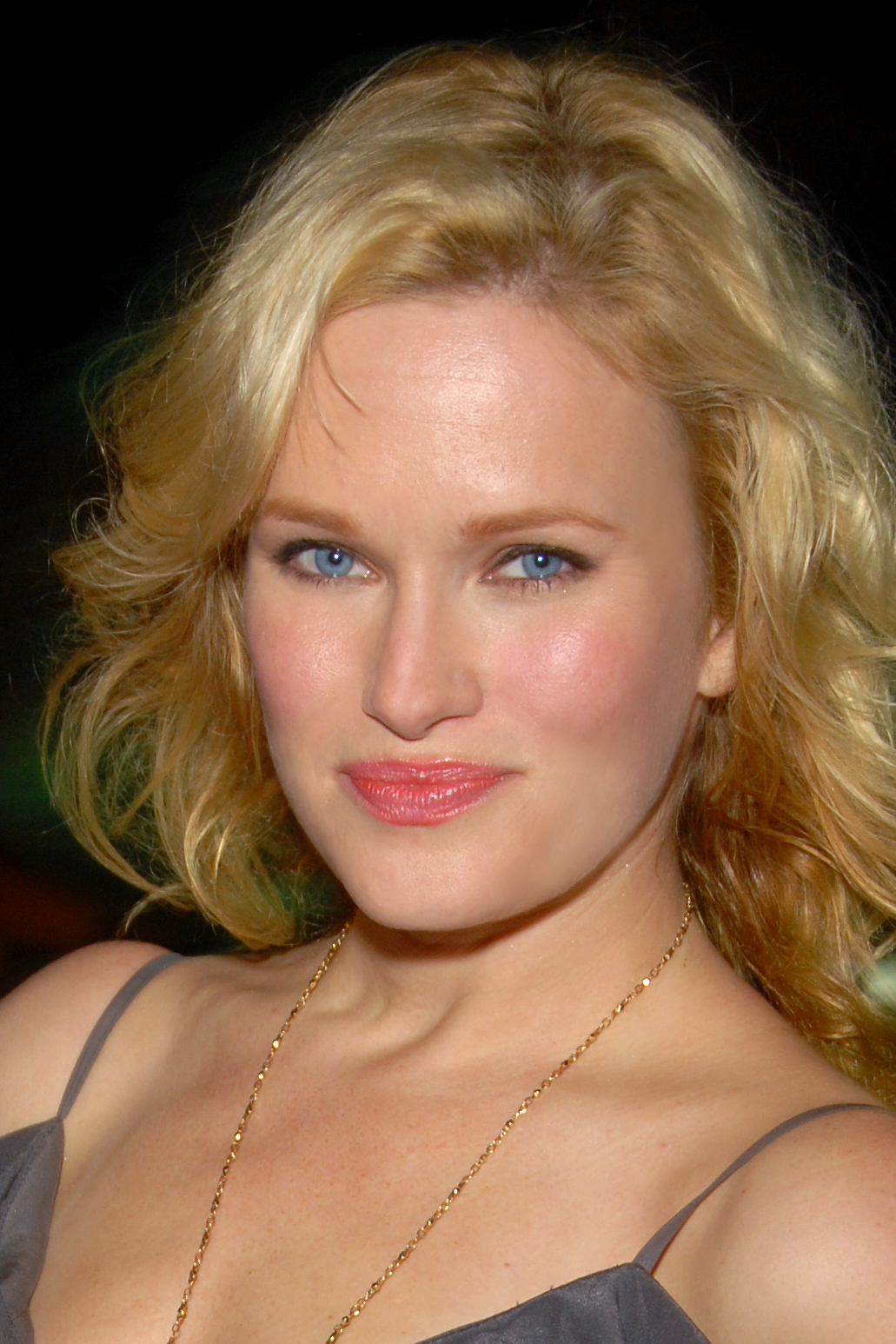
Nicholle Tom

- John Tobias, creator of Mortal Kombat video game
- James Tobin, economist, 1981 Nobel Prize
- Albert Tocco, organized crime figure
- Beverly Todd, actress, Lean on Me, The Bucket List
- Jonathan Toews, three-time Stanley Cup champion with Chicago Blackhawks (born in Canada)
- JP Tokoto, player for Hapoel Tel Aviv of Israeli Basketball Premier League
- Gregg Toland, Oscar-winning cinematographer, Citizen Kane, Wuthering Heights
- Scott Tolzien, NFL quarterback 2011–17, assistant coach
- David Tom, actor, The Young and the Restless, All My Children
- Lauren Tom, actress and voice artist, King of the Hill, The Joy Luck Club, Futurama, W.I.T.C.H.
- Nicholle Tom, actress, The Nanny, The Minor Accomplishments of Jackie Woodman, Her Only Child
- Clyde Tombaugh, astronomer, discoverer of dwarf planet Pluto
- Mike Tomczak, quarterback for four NFL teams
- Darlene Tompkins, actress, Beyond the Time Barrier, Blue Hawaii
- Mario Tonelli, football player, survivor of Bataan Death March
- Judy Baar Topinka, politician (Republican), comptroller, state treasurer
- Mel Tormé, singer, composer, actor, Grammy Lifetime Achievement Award, co-wrote "The Christmas Song"
- Jorge Torres, NCAA cross-country champion
- Johnny Torrio, organized crime figure (born in Italy)
- Audrey Totter, actress, The Postman Always Rings Twice, The Set-Up, High Wall, Tension, Lady in the Lake
- Cy Touff, trumpeter
- Roger Touhy, organized crime figure
- Tom Towles, actor
- Andre Townsend, starter in two Super Bowls for Denver Broncos
- Robert Townsend, actor and director, The Parent 'Hood, The Five Heartbeats, Hollywood Shuffle
- Taylor Townsend, tennis player
- Giorgio Tozzi, opera singer

Tr–Tz

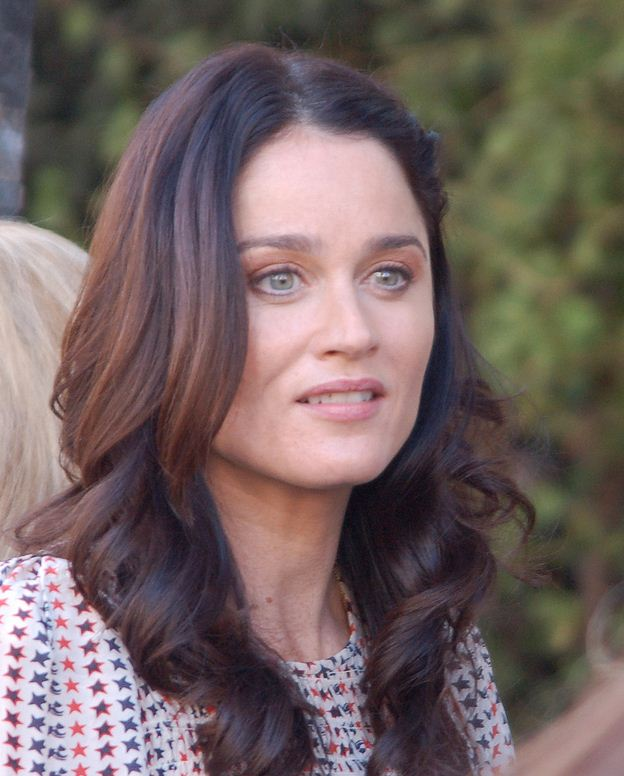
Robin Tunney

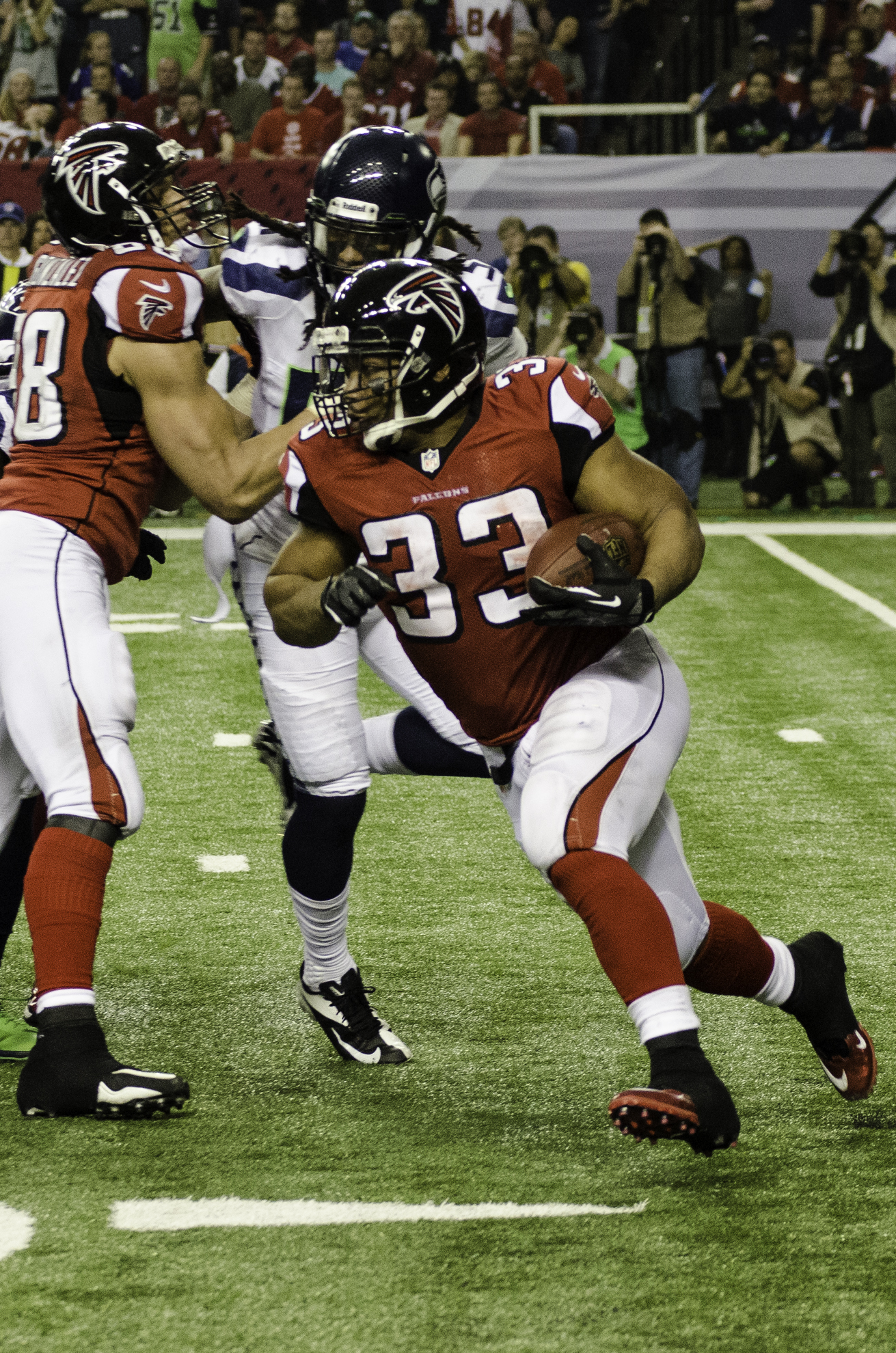
Michael Turner

- Al Trace, songwriter and bandleader
- George Trafton, Hall of Fame center for Chicago Bears
- Jane Trahey, advertising executive
- Mary Ellen Trainor, actress, Roswell, Parker Lewis Can't Lose, the Lethal Weapon films
- Rick Tramonto, restaurateur
- June Travis, actress, Circus Girl, The Case of the Black Cat
- Sam Travis, MLB infielder
- Sam Treiman, theoretical physicist
- Les Tremayne, radio personality (born in England)
- Ken Trickey, college basketball coach (born in Missouri)
- Roswell Tripp, football player for Yale
- Dick Triptow, pro basketball player and coach
- Lennie Tristano, jazz pianist
- Walter Trohan, journalist
- Harry Trotsek, Hall of Fame thoroughbred trainer
- Bill Trotter, MLB pitcher 1937–44
- Charlie Trotter, restaurateur
- Bobbi Trout, aviator
- Jim True-Frost, actor, The Wire
- Walter E. Truemper, pilot, World War II Medal of Honor recipient
- Frankie Trumbauer, jazz saxophonist
- Lyman Trumbull, politician, Illinois Supreme Court justice, U.S. senator, author of Thirteenth Amendment (born in Connecticut)
- Bob Trumpy, tight end for Cincinnati Bengals, sportscaster
- Morgan Tuck, four-time NCAA basketball champion for UConn
- Alando Tucker, pro basketball player, 2007 Big Ten Player of the Year
- Dennis Tufano, singer for The Buckinghams
- Robin Tunney, actress, The Mentalist, Prison Break, The Craft, Hollywoodland, Vertical Limit
- William Tuohy, Pulitzer-winning foreign correspondent
- Barbara Turf, CEO of Crate & Barrel
- Bob Turley, Cy Young-winning pitcher, primarily with New York Yankees
- Bulldog Turner, Hall of Fame player for Chicago Bears (born in Texas)
- Evan Turner, NBA guard 2010–20, second pick of 2010 NBA draft, 2010 Big Ten Player of the Year
- Ike and Tina Turner, musical duo, began in East St. Louis
- Jonathan Baldwin Turner, scholar, botanist, advocate of land grant universities (born in Massachusetts)
- Keena Turner, linebacker for San Francisco 49ers, four-time Super Bowl champion
- Michael Turner, NFL running back 2004–12
- Stansfield Turner, admiral and CIA director
- Scott Turow, author and lawyer, Presumed Innocent
- Bill Tuttle, MLB outfielder 1952–63
- Jeff Tweedy, musician with Wilco
- Twista, rapper
- R. Emmett Tyrrell Jr., founder, editor of The American Spectator

== U ==
- Peter Ueberroth, president of U.S. Olympic Committee, commissioner of Major League Baseball
- Ted Uhlaender, outfielder for Minnesota Twins and Cleveland Indians
- Tyler Ulis, basketball player for Phoenix Suns (born in Michigan)
- Chuck Ulrich, lineman for Illinois 1952 Rose Bowl championship team and NFL's Chicago Cardinals
- Jim Umbricht, pitcher for Houston Colt .45s
- Colton Underwood, football player, The Bachelor star (born in Indiana)
- Lauren Underwood, U.S. Representative (born in Ohio)
- Oliver A. Unger, movie producer, distributor and exhibitor
- Kay Unger, fashion designer
- Tim Unroe, MLB first baseman 1995–2000
- Paul Unruh, 1950 All-America basketball player for Bradley
- Al Unser, MLB catcher 1942–45
- Del Unser, outfielder for six MLB teams
- Phil Upchurch, jazz and R&B guitarist and bassist
- Dawn Upshaw, Grammy-winning soprano
- Calla Urbanski, pairs skater, two-time U.S. champion
- Kraig Urbik, offensive lineman for Buffalo Bills
- Urge Overkill, alt rock band from Chicago
- Brian Urlacher, 13-year Chicago Bears linebacker, Pro Football Hall of Fame (born in Washington)
- Frank Urson, silent-film director, Chicago
- Garrick Utley, television journalist
- Nancy Utley, Hollywood studio executive

== V ==
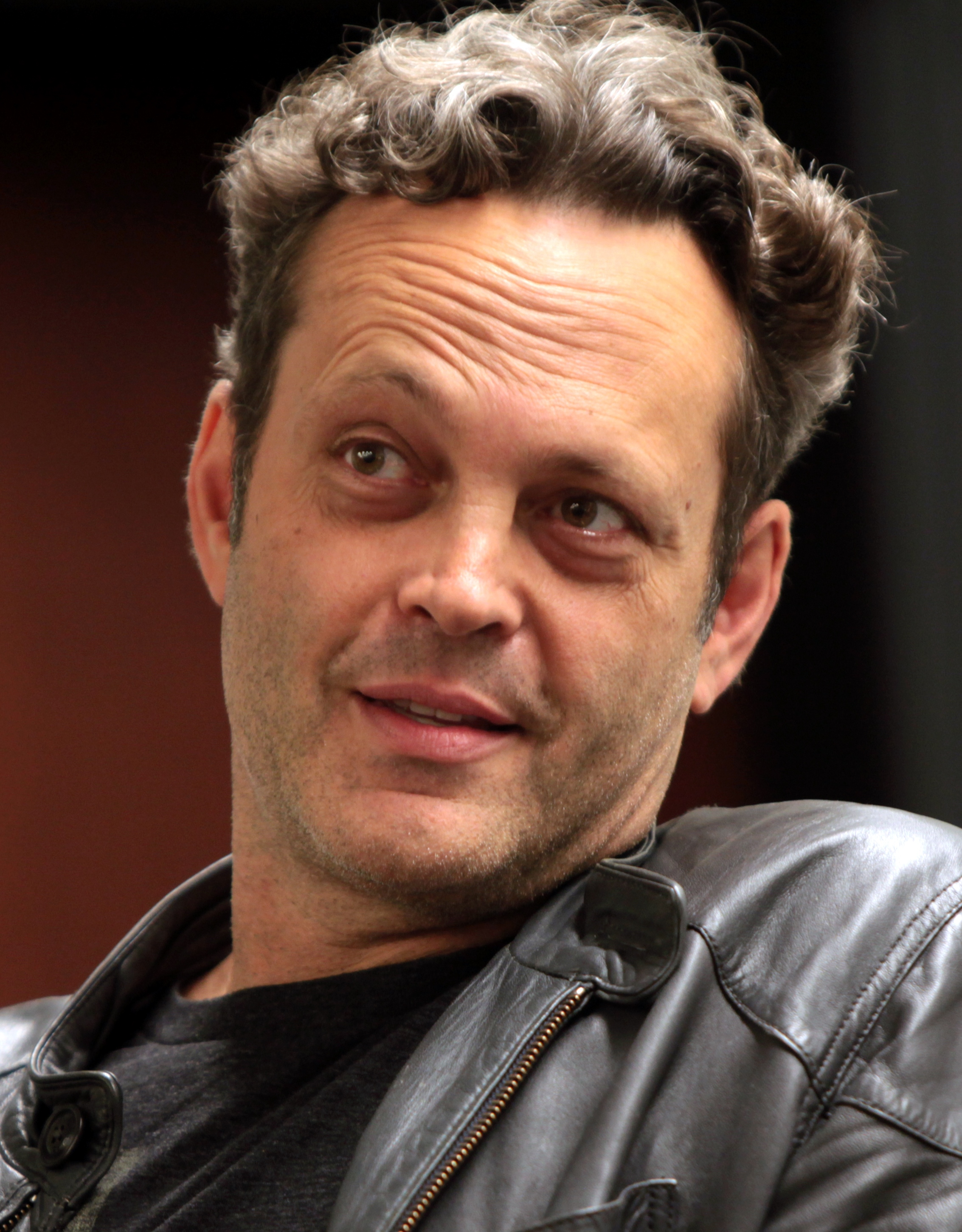
Vince Vaughn

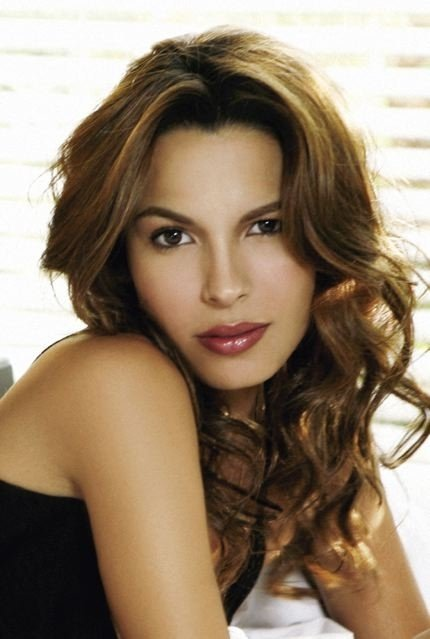
Nadine Velazquez

- Richard B. Vail, World War I officer, U.S. Representative
- Jerry Vainisi, general manager of Chicago Bears 1983–86
- Jim Valek, football player, coach for Illinois
- Darnell Valentine, NBA guard 1981–91
- Elmer Valentine, founder of Whisky a Go Go and The Roxy Theatre
- Vincent Valentine, defensive tackle for New England Patriots
- Virginia Valli, silent movie actress
- Egbert Van Alstyne, songwriter, "In the Shade of the Old Apple Tree"
- John S. Van Bergen, architect
- Al Van Camp, MLB first baseman, outfielder 1928–32
- Danitra Vance, actress, Saturday Night Live cast member
- Gene Vance, basketball player, athletic director for Illinois
- Art Van Damme, accordionist (born in Michigan)
- Christian Vande Velde, professional cyclist
- James Oliver Van de Velde, second Bishop of Chicago (born in Belgium)
- Shaun Vandiver, basketball player and coach
- Carl Clinton Van Doren, author, 1939 Pulitzer Prize for biography
- Mark Van Doren, professor, 1940 Pulitzer Prize for poetry
- Wendelin Van Draanen, author of Sammy Keyes children's novels
- Dick Van Dyke, actor, The Dick Van Dyke Show, Diagnosis: Murder, Bye Bye Birdie, Mary Poppins (born in Missouri)
- Jerry Van Dyke, actor, comedian, Coach, The Courtship of Eddie's Father, My Mother the Car
- Brian Van Holt, actor, Cougar Town, John from Cincinnati
- William Cornelius Van Horne, railroad mogul, first mayor of Joliet
- Phillip Edward Van Lear, actor, Prison Break
- Norm Van Lier, player and broadcaster for Chicago Bulls (born in Ohio)
- Homer Van Meter, bank robber (born in Indiana)
- Sander Vanocur, television news journalist
- John M. Van Osdel, architect (born in Maryland)
- Melvin Van Peebles, director, screenwriter, actor, composer
- Jim Van Pelt, two-time Grey Cup champion CFL quarterback
- Todd Van Poppel, MLB pitcher 1991–2004
- Samuel Van Sant, governor of Minnesota 1901–05
- Virginia Van Upp, writer, producer, Cover Girl, Gilda
- Virginia Van Wie, golfer, three-time U.S. Women's Amateur champion
- Fred VanVleet, point guard, 2019 NBA champion with Toronto Raptors
- Bruce Vaughan, golfer, winner of British Senior Open
- Chico Vaughn, Southern Illinois and pro basketball player
- Clarence Vaughn, NFL defensive back 1987–92
- Govoner Vaughn, basketball player
- Hippo Vaughn, pitcher for Cubs 1913–21 (born in Texas)
- Vince Vaughn, actor, The Lost World: Jurassic Park, Wedding Crashers, Fred Claus, Psycho, The Break-Up
- Eddie Vedder, lead vocalist for Pearl Jam
- Bill Veeck, owner of Chicago White Sox, Cleveland Indians, St. Louis Browns, member of Hall of Fame
- William Veeck Sr., sportswriter, president of Chicago Cubs
- Nadine Velazquez, actress and model, My Name Is Earl, Flight
- Sasha Velour, drag queen, 9th-season winner of RuPaul's Drag Race (born in California)
- Rachel Veltri, actress and model
- Robin Ventura, third baseman, manager for Chicago White Sox (born in California)
- Rick Venturi, head football coach for Northwestern, defensive coordinator for four NFL teams
- Mark Venturini, actor
- Emil Verban, three-time All-Star infielder, played for 1944 World Series champion St. Louis Cardinals
- Jim Verraros, singer, Season 1 of American Idol
- Dick Versace, basketball coach, Bradley and Indiana Pacers (born in North Carolina)
- Izabela Vidovic, actress, singer, The Fosters, About a Boy
- Vince Vieluf, actor, Love, Inc., Rat Race
- Marjorie Vincent, news broadcaster and 1991 Miss America
- Jory Vinikour, harpsichordist and conductor
- Steve Vinovich, actor
- Craig Virgin, distance runner, three-time Olympian, won nine Big Ten track titles and NCAA cross country
- C. T. Vivian, associate of Martin Luther King Jr., awarded Presidential Medal of Freedom (born in Missouri)
- John Vivyan, actor, Mr. Lucky
- Alex Vlasic, NHL defenseman
- Virgil W. Vogel, film and TV director
- Rich Vogler, auto racer, five Indianapolis 500s
- Deborah Voigt, opera singer
- Mark Voigt, NASCAR driver
- Bob Voigts, Northwestern football player and coach
- Harry Volkman, 45-year Chicago television weather forecaster
- King Von (Dayvon Bennett), rapper
- Kevin Von Erich, professional wrestler
- Rufus B. von KleinSmid, president, University of Southern California 1921–47, raised in Von KleinSmid Mansion
- Pete Vonachen, Minor League Baseball executive
- Edward Vrdolyak, politician, Chicago alderman 1971–87, convicted of fraud
- George Vukovich, MLB outfielder 1980–85
- Charles W. Vursell, sheriff of Marion County, Illinois, U.S. Representative 1943–59

== W ==
Waa–Wam

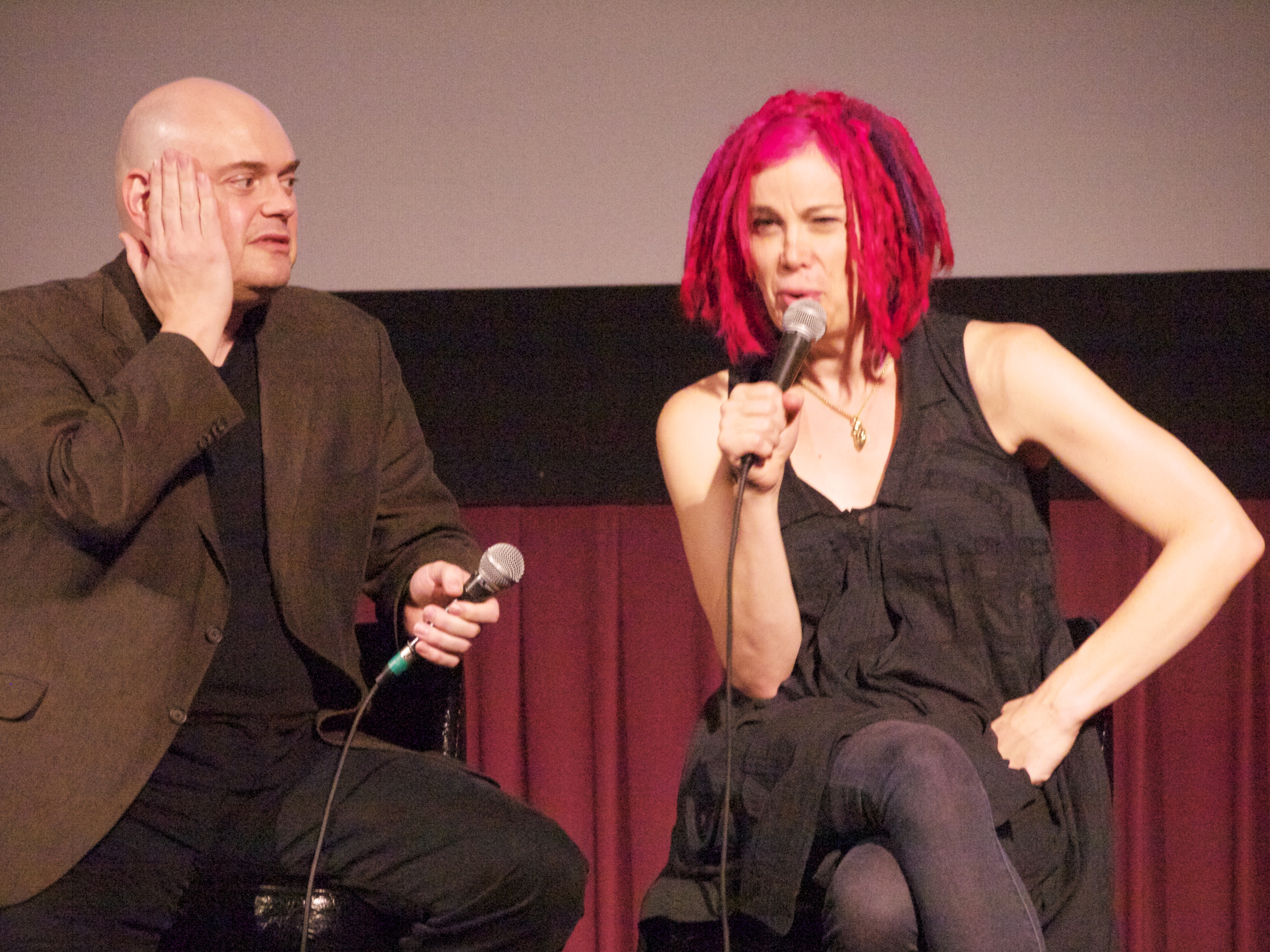
The Wachowskis

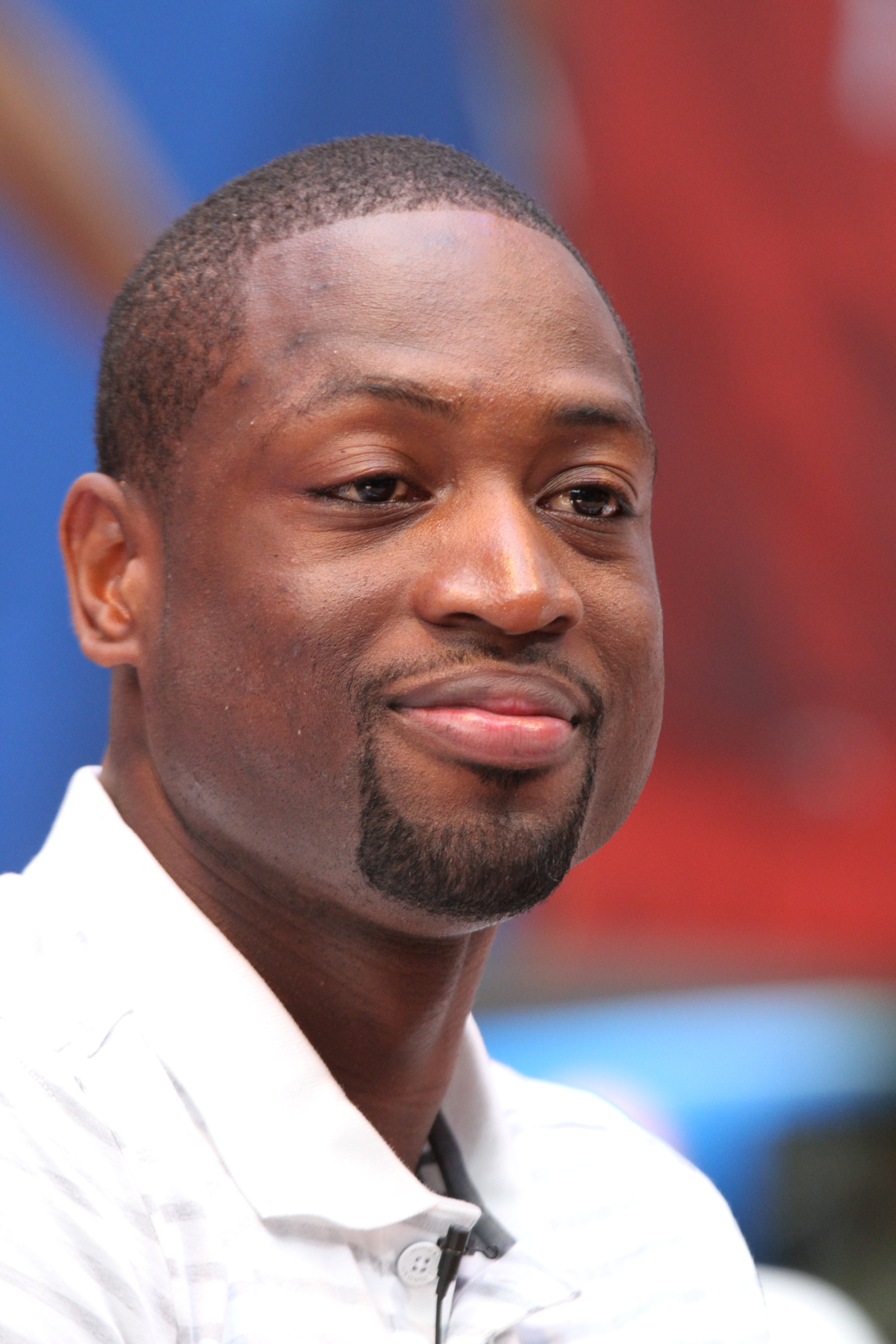
Dwyane Wade

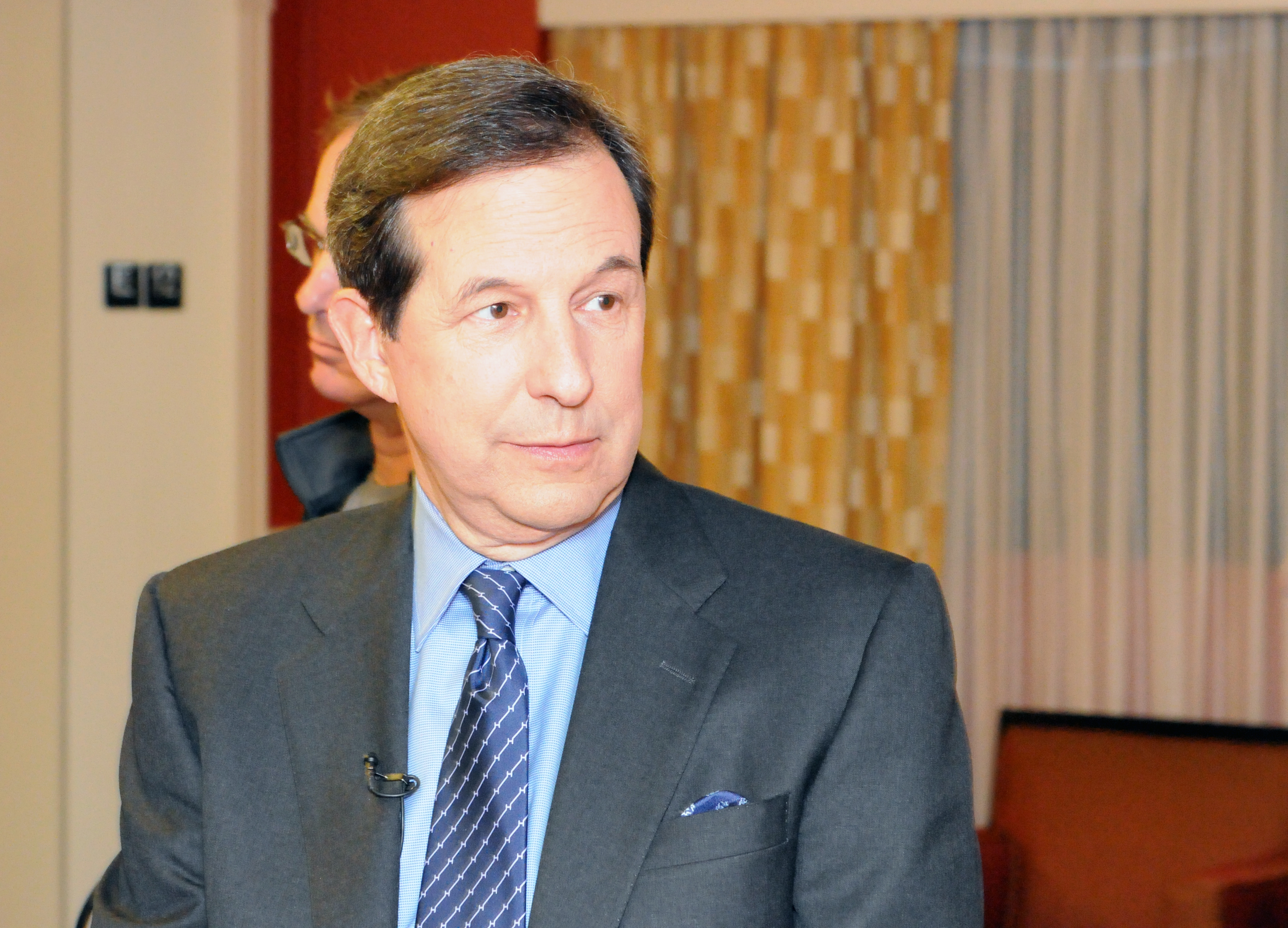
Chris Wallace

- The Wachowskis, filmmakers, the Matrix trilogy
- Charles H. Wacker, city planner, director of Chicago World's Fair
- Dwyane Wade, Hall of Fame basketball player, three-time NBA champion with Miami Heat
- Robert Wadlow, tallest man in U.S.
- E. S. Wadsworth, merchant, railroad president (born in Connecticut)
- Arthur L. Wagner, U.S. Army general
- Audrey Wagner, pro baseball player
- Gary Wagner, pitcher for Philadelphia Phillies 1965–69
- Mike Wagner, defensive back for Pittsburgh Steelers, won four Super Bowls
- Susan Wagner, financial executive, co-founder of BlackRock
- Ken Wahl, actor, Wiseguy, The Wanderers, Fort Apache, the Bronx
- Becky Wahlstrom, actress, Joan of Arcadia
- Jerry Wainwright, basketball coach of DePaul 2005–10
- Frank Wainright, tight end for four NFL teams
- Lena Waithe, actress, writer, producer, The Chi, Master of None, Ready Player One
- Dick Wakefield, MLB outfielder 1941–52
- Tim Walberg, U.S. Representative of Michigan
- Eliot Wald, TV and film comedy writer
- Frank Waldman, screenwriter, The Party, Return of the Pink Panther
- Randy Waldman, musician
- Tom Waldman, screenwriter, High Time, Inspector Clouseau
- Jim Walewander, MLB infielder 1987–93
- Charles Rudolph Walgreen, founder of Walgreens
- Albertina Walker, gospel singer
- Antoine Walker, forward for five NBA teams
- Bill Walker, MLB pitcher 1927–36
- Chet Walker, forward for Bradley and Chicago Bulls (born in Michigan)
- Clint Walker, actor, Cheyenne, The Dirty Dozen, Yellowstone Kelly
- Dan Walker, Governor of Illinois 1973–77 (born in D.C.)
- Darrell Walker, player for five NBA teams
- Derrick Walker, tight end for three NFL teams
- George W. Walker, auto designer, original Ford Thunderbird
- June Walker, actress
- Mysterious Walker, three-sport athlete, coach for University of Chicago (born in Nebraska)
- Nella Walker, actress
- William J. Walker, Army major general, U.S. House sergeant at arms
- Amy Wallace, author (born in California)
- Chris Wallace, television journalist, Fox News Channel and CNN
- David Foster Wallace, author (born in New York)
- Henry Cantwell Wallace, U.S. Secretary of Agriculture 1921–24
- Irving Wallace, author and screenwriter
- Jean Wallace, actress, Jigsaw, The Big Combo
- Martin R. M. Wallace, Union general in Civil War (born in Ohio)
- Mike Wallace, Chicago radio-TV personality and CBS News journalist (born in Massachusetts)
- Stan Wallace, defensive back for Chicago Bears 1954–59
- W.H.L. Wallace, Union general in Civil War (born in Ohio)
- Stephen Wallem, actor, Nurse Jackie
- Hal Wallis, film producer, Casablanca, The Maltese Falcon, Gunfight at the O.K. Corral, Blue Hawaii, True Grit
- Joe Wallis, MLB outfielder 1975–79
- Laurie Walquist, quarterback for Chicago Bears 1924–31
- Ed Walsh, pitcher and manager for Chicago White Sox, member of Hall of Fame (born in Pennsylvania)
- Frank Walsh, pro golfer, 1932 PGA Championship runner-up
- Matt Walsh, actor, Upright Citizens Brigade, Veep
- Minnie Gow Walsworth, poet
- Kevin Walter, NFL wide receiver 2003–13
- Melora Walters, actress, Cold Mountain, Boogie Nights, Magnolia
- Lloyd Walton, guard for Milwaukee Bucks 1976–80

Wan–Waz

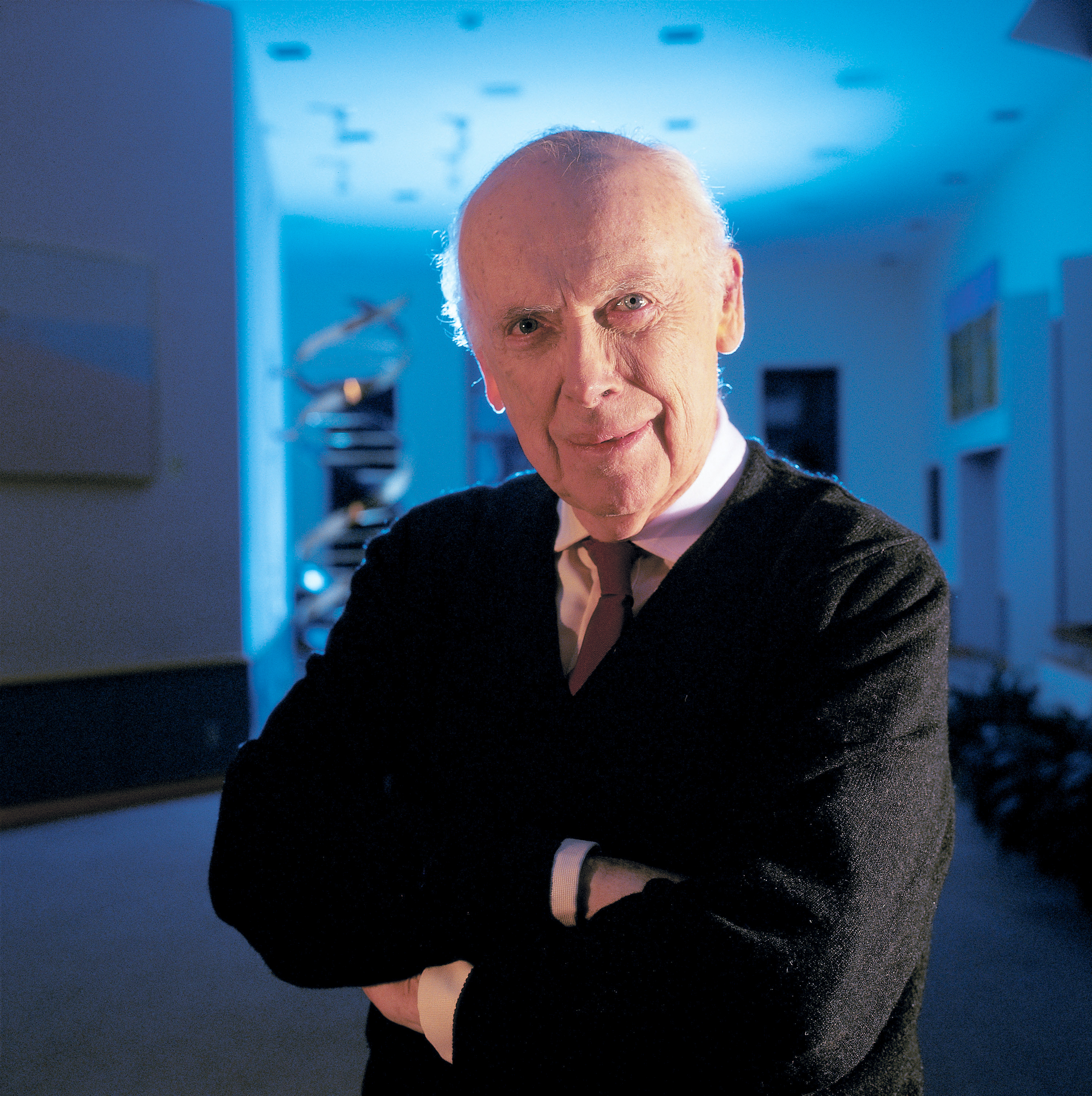
James Watson

- Sam Wanamaker, director and actor, The Spy Who Came in from the Cold, Superman IV, Guilty by Suspicion
- Carl Wanderer, World War I hero, convicted murderer
- Rudolf Wanderone, billiards' "Minnesota Fats" (born in New York)
- Betty Wanless, baseball player
- Aaron Montgomery Ward, retail businessman, creator of mail order catalog (born in New Jersey)
- Arch Ward, journalist, creator of baseball All-Star Game and boxing's Golden Gloves
- Brian Wardle, basketball coach, Bradley
- Wilbur Ware, jazz bassist
- Marsha Warfield, actress, Night Court
- Cy Warmoth, MLB player 1916–23
- Henry C. Warmoth, Civil War officer, governor of Louisiana
- Mark Warner, politician (Democrat), governor and U.S. senator of Virginia (born in Indiana)
- Vespasian Warner, Civil War soldier, U.S. Representative
- Elihu B. Washburne, U.S. Secretary of State under Ulysses S. Grant (born in Maine)
- Hempstead Washburne, Mayor of Chicago 1891–93
- Dinah Washington, singer, 1993 inductee in Rock and Roll Hall of Fame (born in Alabama)
- Harold Washington, first African-American Mayor of Chicago
- Mark Washington, NFL defensive back 1970–79
- Stan Wasiak, managed 4,844 minor-league baseball games
- Ted Wass, actor, Soap, Blossom, Oh, God! You Devil, Sheena, Curse of the Pink Panther
- Muddy Waters, blues musician and songwriter, Grammy Lifetime Achievement Award (born in Mississippi)
- Maurine Dallas Watkins, Chicago reporter who wrote stage play Chicago (born in Kentucky)
- Jody Watley, singer, songwriter, record producer
- Betty Jane Watson, singer and actress
- Bobby Watson, actor
- Deek Watson, original member of singing group The Ink Spots
- James Watson, molecular biologist, geneticist, co-discoverer of structure of DNA, winner of Nobel Prize
- Minor Watson, actor, Boys Town, The Jackie Robinson Story
- William Watson, actor, Lawman, Chato's Land
- Chris Watt, guard, Notre Dame and NFL
- May Theilgaard Watts, naturalist and writer
- Bobby Wawak, auto racer
- Ruby Wax, comedian, TV personality, Absolutely Fabulous, Girls on Top
- Carol Wayne, actress, television personality, Heartbreakers
- Nina Wayne, actress, Luv

Wb–Wg

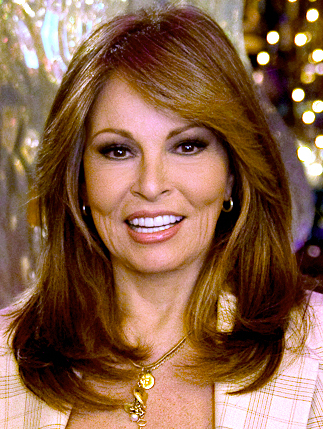
Raquel Welch

- Frank Wead, aviator and Oscar-nominated screenwriter
- Betty, Jean and Joanne Weaver, sisters in All-American Girls Professional Baseball League
- Buck Weaver, third baseman for 1917 World Series champion White Sox and 1919 "Black Sox" (born in Pennsylvania)
- Jason Weaver, actor, Smart Guy, Thea
- Bill Webb, coach, executive with White Sox
- Richard Webb, actor, Out of the Past, Distant Drums
- Wellington Webb, mayor of Denver, Colorado 1991–2003
- Jon Weber, jazz musician, NPR host
- Pete Weber, hockey broadcaster
- Mary Webster, actress
- Stokely Webster, impressionist painter
- Tracy Webster, basketball coach
- Reinhold Weege, comedy writer, creator of TV series Night Court
- Charles Weeghman, businessman, built Wrigley Field, owned Chicago Cubs (born in Indiana)
- D. A. Weibring, professional golfer
- Bill Weick, Greco-Roman wrestler and coach, member of first U.S. World Championships team 1961
- Tim Weigel, Chicago television broadcaster
- Joseph "Yellow Kid" Weil, notorious con artist
- Bob Weiland, pitcher for five MLB teams
- Jane Weiller, golfer
- Alvin M. Weinberg, nuclear physicist
- Lawrence Weingarten, Oscar-winning film producer
- Robbie Weinhardt, pitcher for Detroit Tigers
- Phil Weintraub, MLB player, had 11-RBI game in 1944
- Hymie Weiss, mobster, rival of Al Capone (born in Poland)
- Lois Weisberg, created Chicago Blues Festival and Taste of Chicago
- Burton Weisbrod, economist who pioneered theory of option value
- Mark Weisbrot, economist, columnist
- Mark Weiser, chief scientist at Xerox PARC
- Bob Weiskopf, TV writer, I Love Lucy
- Michael T. Weiss, actor, The Pretender, The Legend of Tarzan
- Robbie Weiss, 1988 NCAA tennis champion
- Johnny Weissmuller, athlete and actor, five-time Olympic swim gold medalist, star of Tarzan films (born in Hungary)
- Chris Welch, politician, speaker of Illinois House of Representatives
- Raquel Welch, actress, One Million Years B.C., Fantastic Voyage, Bandolero!, The Last of Sheila, Myra Breckinridge
- Jerry Weller, U.S. Representative 1995–2009
- Orson Welles, actor and director, Citizen Kane, The Third Man, Touch of Evil (born in Wisconsin)
- Judson Welliver, presidential speechwriter
- Jon Wellner, actor, Henry Andrews on CSI: Crime Scene Investigation
- Junior Wells, blues musician (born in Tennessee)
- Randy Wells, pitcher for Chicago Cubs 2008–12
- Marty Wendell, football player for Notre Dame
- Joe Wendryhoski, NFL guard 1964–68
- George Wendt, actor, Norm Peterson on television series Cheers
- John Wentworth, politician (Democrat), U.S. Congressman, Mayor of Chicago and newspaper editor (born in New Hampshire)
- Pete Wentz, bass player of Fall Out Boy
- Dennis Werth, player for New York Yankees 1979–81
- Jayson Werth, MLB outfielder 2002–17
- Paul Wertico, drummer with Pat Metheny Group
- Dallas West, billiards player
- Kanye West, multiple Grammy Award-winning rap musician, songwriter, producer, fashion designer, actor; husband of reality TV star Kim Kardashian
- Mary Allen West, journalist, editor, educator, social reformer
- Matthew West, Christian musician
- Roy Owen West, U.S. Secretary of the Interior 1928–29
- Helen Westerman, baseball player
- Thomas D. Westfall, mayor of El Paso, Texas 1978–82
- Edward Weston, photographer
- Haskell Wexler, Oscar-winning cinematographer, producer, director
- Jerrold Wexler, financier

Wh

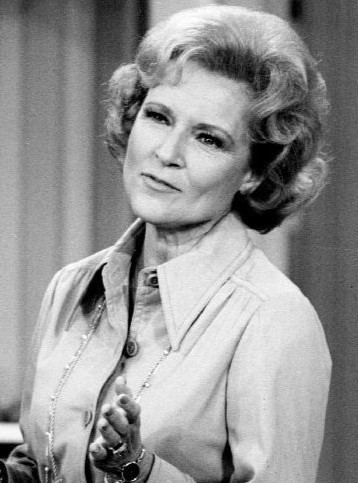
Betty White

- Warren L. Wheaton, philanthropist, namesake of Wheaton, Illinois (born in Connecticut)
- Cora Stuart Wheeler, poet, writer, journalist, lecturer
- Loren E. Wheeler, mayor of Springfield, U.S. Representative
- John Whistler, first commandant of Fort Dearborn (born in Ireland)
- Betty White, Emmy-winning actress and comedian, The Golden Girls, The Mary Tyler Moore Show, The Proposal, Hot in Cleveland
- Deacon White, baseball Hall of Famer (born in New York)
- Frank White, eighth Governor of North Dakota, 1921–28 U.S. Secretary of Treasury
- George A. White, military officer and journalist
- Isaac White, 19th-century militia officer (born in Virginia)
- Jesse White, politician, Illinois Secretary of State
- John H. White, Pulitzer Prize-winning photographer
- Maurice White, musician, founder of Earth, Wind & Fire
- Michole Briana White, actress
- Nettie L. White, stenographer, suffragist
- Stephanie White, head coach, WNBA's Connecticut Sun; 1998–99 Player of the Year for NCAA champion Purdue
- Verdine White, musician, original member of Earth, Wind & Fire
- Wendy White, opera singer
- Willye White, track-and-field athlete, five-time Olympian
- Jerome Whitehead, center-forward for Marquette, six NBA teams
- John C. Whitehead, banker, civil servant, chairman of Lower Manhattan Development Corporation
- Steven Whitehurst, author, poet, educator
- Larry Whiteside, sportswriter, 2008 Spink Award winner
- Samuel Whiteside, soldier and 19th-century member of U.S. General Assembly (born in North Carolina)
- Richard A. Whiting, composer, "On the Good Ship Lollipop", "Hooray for Hollywood"

Wi

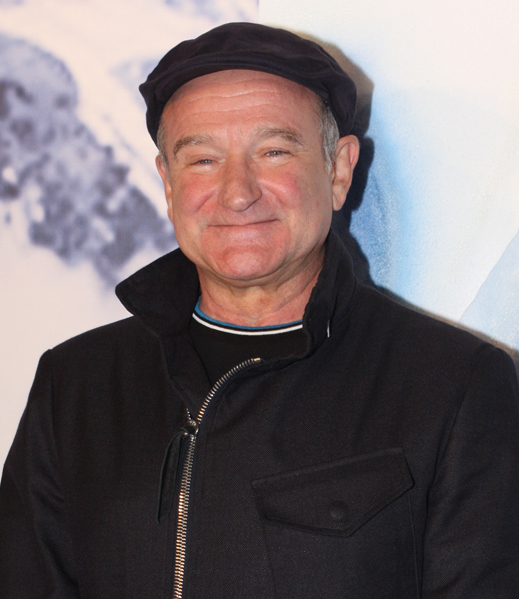
Robin Williams

- Al Wickland, MLB outfielder 1913–19
- Richard Widmark, Oscar-nominated actor, Judgment at Nuremberg, The Alamo, Kiss of Death, Night and the City, How the West Was Won, Murder on the Orient Express
- Scott Wike, U.S. Representative, assistant treasury secretary to Grover Cleveland (born in Pennsylvania)
- Michael Wilbon, sports columnist, co-host of ESPN's Pardon the Interruption
- Wilco, rock band from Chicago
- Linda Wild, tennis player
- Lee and Lyn Wilde, actresses, Twice Blessed, Campus Honeymoon
- Thornton Wilder, playwright, University of Chicago professor (born in Wisconsin)
- Tim Wilkerson, drag racer
- David B. Wilkins, Harvard law professor
- Jeff Wilkins, center for Utah Jazz 1980–86
- J. Ernest Wilkins Jr., nuclear scientist, University of Chicago student at 13
- Amie Wilkinson, mathematician and professor
- Steve Wilkos, television personality, The Jerry Springer Show, The Steve Wilkos Show
- Bob Will, outfielder for Cubs 1957–63
- George Will, conservative Pulitzer Prize-winning columnist, journalist, ABC news analyst, author
- Alice Willard, journalist, editor
- Frances E. Willard, suffragist, head of temperance union, Northwestern dean of women (born in New York)
- Frank Willard, cartoonist, creator of Moon Mullins
- Louise Collier Willcox, writer, editor, anthologist, translator
- Lois Wille, Pulitzer Prize-winning journalist
- Walt Willey, actor, All My Children
- Aaron Williams, forward for 10 NBA teams
- Billy Williams, 15-year outfielder for Cubs, member of Hall of Fame (born in Alabama)
- Brandon Williams, NFL tight end
- Cynda Williams, actress, Mo' Better Blues, One False Move
- Dick Anthony Williams, actor, Homefront, The Mack, Dog Day Afternoon
- Frank Williams, NBA and Illinois guard, 2001 Big Ten Player of the Year
- Jason Williams, linebacker for five NFL teams
- Jesse Williams, actor, Grey's Anatomy, Lee Daniels' The Butler
- Joe Williams, jazz and blues singer, Count Basie Orchestra (born in Georgia)
- Joe Williams, Olympic wrestler, three-time NCAA champion
- Juice Williams, quarterback for Illinois
- Kenny Williams, outfielder, executive for Chicago White Sox (born in California)
- Kyle Williams, NFL wide receiver 2010–16 (born in California)
- Mayo Williams, football player and music producer
- Michelle Williams, R&B singer-songwriter, member of Destiny's Child, actress
- Robin Williams, comedian and Oscar-winning actor, Good Will Hunting, Good Morning, Vietnam, Mrs. Doubtfire, Dead Poets Society, Mork & Mindy, Aladdin
- Rip Williams, MLB player 1911–18
- Ron Williams, CEO and chairman of Aetna Inc. 2006–11
- Tex Williams, western swing musician
- William E. Williams, three-term U.S. Representative
- Richard S. Williamson, diplomat in George W. Bush administration
- Sonny Boy Williamson, blues harmonica musician (born in Tennessee)
- Dave Willock, actor, What Ever Happened to Baby Jane?
- Dave Wills, baseball broadcaster for Tampa Bay Rays 2005–23
- Art Wilson, MLB catcher 1908–21
- Ben Wilson, murdered high school basketball star
- Bobby Wilson, NFL tackle 1991–94
- Dan Wilson, MLB catcher 1992–2005, Seattle Mariners Hall of Fame
- Dooley Wilson, singer, "Sam" in Casablanca (born in Texas)
- Gahan Wilson, cartoonist
- George Wilson, NFL player and coach
- George Wilson, NBA center, played in two NCAA title games (born in Mississippi)
- Gretchen Wilson, country music singer
- Hack Wilson, Hall of Fame outfielder for Cubs, record-breaking 191-RBI season (born in Pennsylvania)
- Hugh R. Wilson, diplomat, assistant Secretary of State
- James H. Wilson, Civil War general
- Kenneth L. Wilson, president of United States Olympic Committee 1953–65, Big Ten commissioner 1945–61
- Martez Wilson, linebacker for three NFL teams
- Parke Wilson, MLB catcher of 19th century
- Pete Wilson, politician, mayor of San Diego 1971–83, U.S. senator 1983–91, Governor of California 1991–99
- Richard G. Wilson, soldier, Medal of Honor winner
- Thomas E. Wilson, founder of Wilson Sporting Goods (born in Canada)
- Whip Wilson, actor in western films
- William Warfield Wilson, four-term U.S. representative
- Frank Wilton, football coach, Miami University 1932–41
- Hal Wiltse, MLB pitcher 1926–31
- Verne Winchell, founder of Winchell's Donuts
- Dorothy Wind, baseball player
- William G. Windrich, Medal of Honor recipient from Korean War
- Henry Haven Windsor, editor, founder of Popular Mechanics
- Jill Wine-Banks, lawyer, Watergate scandal prosecutor
- Oprah Winfrey, iconic television host, actress, producer and media magnate (born in Mississippi)
- Tommy Wingels, NHL wing 2010–18
- Clare Winger, science-fiction writer
- Dan Winkler, MLB relief pitcher
- Roy Winsor, soap opera creator, Search for Tomorrow
- Florence Hull Winterburn, writer, editor
- Frank Winters, basketball coach
- Nobby Wirkowski, CFL quarterback
- Arthur Wirtz, owned Chicago Stadium, Chicago Blackhawks, Chicago Bulls, Detroit Red Wings
- Bill Wirtz, 41-year president of Chicago Blackhawks
- Danny Wirtz, owner of Chicago Blackhawks
- Rocky Wirtz, owner of Chicago Blackhawks 2007–23
- W. Willard Wirtz, U.S. secretary of labor under John F. Kennedy and Lyndon B. Johnson
- Lindsay Wisdom-Hylton, WNBA player 2009–12
- Beverly "Pudgy" Wisniewski, comedian
- Al, Alvin and Whitey Wistert, members of College Football Hall of Fame
- John Wittenborn, NFL kicker 1958–68
- Tom Wittum, NFL punter 1973–77
- Samuel Witwer, actor, Davis Bloome on Smallville

Wj–Wz

- Rick Wohlhuter, runner, 1976 Olympic bronze medalist in 800 meters
- Gary K. Wolf, author of novel adapted into Who Framed Roger Rabbit
- Hillary Wolf, actress, judo player, Home Alone, Home Alone 2
- Raymond Wolf, football coach, North Carolina, Florida, Tulane
- Ross Wolf, MLB pitcher 2008–13
- Garrett Wolfe, running back, Northern Illinois and Chicago Bears
- Ian Wolfe, actor, Bedlam, Julius Caesar
- Roger Wolff, MLB pitcher 1941–46
- Violet Bidwill Wolfner, owner of NFL's Chicago and St. Louis Cardinals 1947–62
- Benson Wood, Civil War officer, U.S. Representative (born in Pennsylvania)
- Corinne Wood, first female lieutenant governor of Illinois
- Elizabeth Wood, director of Chicago Housing Authority 1937–54 (born in Japan)
- James N. Wood, director of Art Institute of Chicago 1979–2004
- John Wood, Governor of Illinois 1860–61, founder of Quincy, Illinois (born in New York)
- Kerry Wood, 10-year pitcher for Cubs (born in Texas)
- Mike Woodard, MLB infielder 1985–88
- Cliff Woodbury, auto racer, third in 1926 Indy 500
- Jim Woods, MLB infielder 1957–61
- Ray Woods, first basketball All-American for Illinois 1915–17
- Abe Woodson, NFL cornerback 1958–66 (born in Mississippi)
- Bob Woodward, journalist for Washington Post, instrumental in Watergate scandal, co-author of All the President's Men
- Neil Woodward, Naval officer, NASA astronaut
- James Hutchinson Woodworth, U.S. Representative, Mayor of Chicago 1848–50 (born in New York)
- John Maynard Woodworth, first U.S. Surgeon General (born in New York)
- Collett E. Woolman, co-founder of Delta Air Lines
- Ralph Works, MLB pitcher 1909–13
- Stephen T. Worland, economist
- Robert Wrenn, tennis player, one of Teddy Roosevelt's Rough Riders
- Amy Wright, actress, The Accidental Tourist, The Scarlet Letter
- Eric C. Wright, defensive back, four-time Super Bowl champion with San Francisco 49ers
- Eugene Wright, bassist with Dave Brubeck Quartet
- Frank Lloyd Wright, iconic architect, designer, writer and educator (born in Wisconsin)
- Jeremiah Wright, retired pastor of Trinity United Church of Christ (born in Pennsylvania)
- Joseph C. Wright, Oscar-winning art director
- Julian Wright, pro basketball player
- Margie Wright, softball Hall of Famer
- Michael Wright, pro basketball player
- Randy Wright, quarterback for Green Bay Packers 1984–88
- Warren Wright Sr., owner of horse racing's Calumet Farm (born in Ohio)
- P.K. Wrigley, chewing gum mogul, Chicago Cubs owner 1932–77
- William Wrigley Jr., founder of Wrigley Company, majority owner of Cubs 1918–32 (born in Pennsylvania)
- William Wrigley III, CEO of Wrigley Co., sold Cubs to Tribune Company
- Jim Wulff, defensive back, 1956 Rose Bowl champion Michigan State
- Vic Wunderle, archer, 2000 Olympic silver medalist
- Alex Wurman, film and TV composer
- Addie L. Wyatt, civil rights activist (born in Mississippi)
- John Wyatt, pitcher for five MLB teams
- Brooke Wyckoff, player for three WNBA teams
- Victoria Wyndham, actress, Another World
- Renaldo Wynn, player for four NFL teams
- Marvell Wynne, MLB outfielder 1983–90
- Johnny Wyrostek, MLB outfielder 1942–54

== Y ==
- Rick Yager, cartoonist
- Kevin Yagher, special effects technician
- Luke Yaklich, basketball coach, Illinois-Chicago
- Estelle Yancey, blues singer
- Jimmy Yancey, jazz musician
- Ron Yary, Hall of Fame offensive tackle, primarily with Minnesota Vikings, 1969 NFL champion
- Richard Yates Sr., politician (Republican), U.S. representative, U.S. senator, governor of Illinois 1861–65 (born in Kentucky)
- Richard Yates Jr., politician (Republican), attorney, U.S. representative, Governor of Illinois 1901–05
- Sidney R. Yates, politician (Democrat), 49-year U.S. representative
- Leland B. Yeager, economist, expert on monetary policy and international trade
- Molly Yeh, cookbook author, Food Network personality
- Charles Yerkes, financier, mass-transit developer (born in Pennsylvania)
- Mary Agnes Yerkes, painter
- Philip Yordan, Oscar-winning screenwriter, Detective Story, Johnny Guitar, The Harder They Fall
- Dick York, actor, Bewitched, Inherit the Wind (born in Indiana)
- John J. York, actor, General Hospital, Werewolf
- Bruce A. Young, actor, The Sentinel, Blink, The Color of Money
- Bryant Young, Hall of Fame defensive lineman for Super Bowl XXIX champion San Francisco 49ers
- Buddy Young, NFL running back and College Football Hall of Famer
- Chic Young, creator of comic strip Blondie
- Clara Kimball Young, actress
- Donald Young, professional tennis player
- Ella Flagg Young, superintendent of Chicago schools 1909–1915 (born in New York)
- Ernie Young, outfielder for five MLB teams, minor-league manager, 2000 Olympic gold medalist
- Frank A. Young, sportswriter for Chicago Defender
- James Young, musician with Styx
- John Young, jazz pianist
- Larry Young, MLB umpire
- Richard M. Young, judge, U.S. senator 1837–43
- Robert Young, actor, Father Knows Best, Marcus Welby, M.D., Crossfire, Northwest Passage, Western Union
- Roger Young, writer, director, Lassiter, The Squeeze
- Victor Young, Oscar-winning composer, arranger, violinist, conductor; wrote "When I Fall in Love", "Around the World"
- Zora Young, blues singer (born in Mississippi)
- Robin Yount, Hall of Fame player for Milwaukee Brewers
- Linda Yu, television newscaster (born in China)
- Jay Yuenger, musician with White Zombie
- Rich Yunkus, basketball player
- Timi Yuro, singer, "Hurt"
- Kateryna Yushchenko, former First Lady of Ukraine

== Z ==
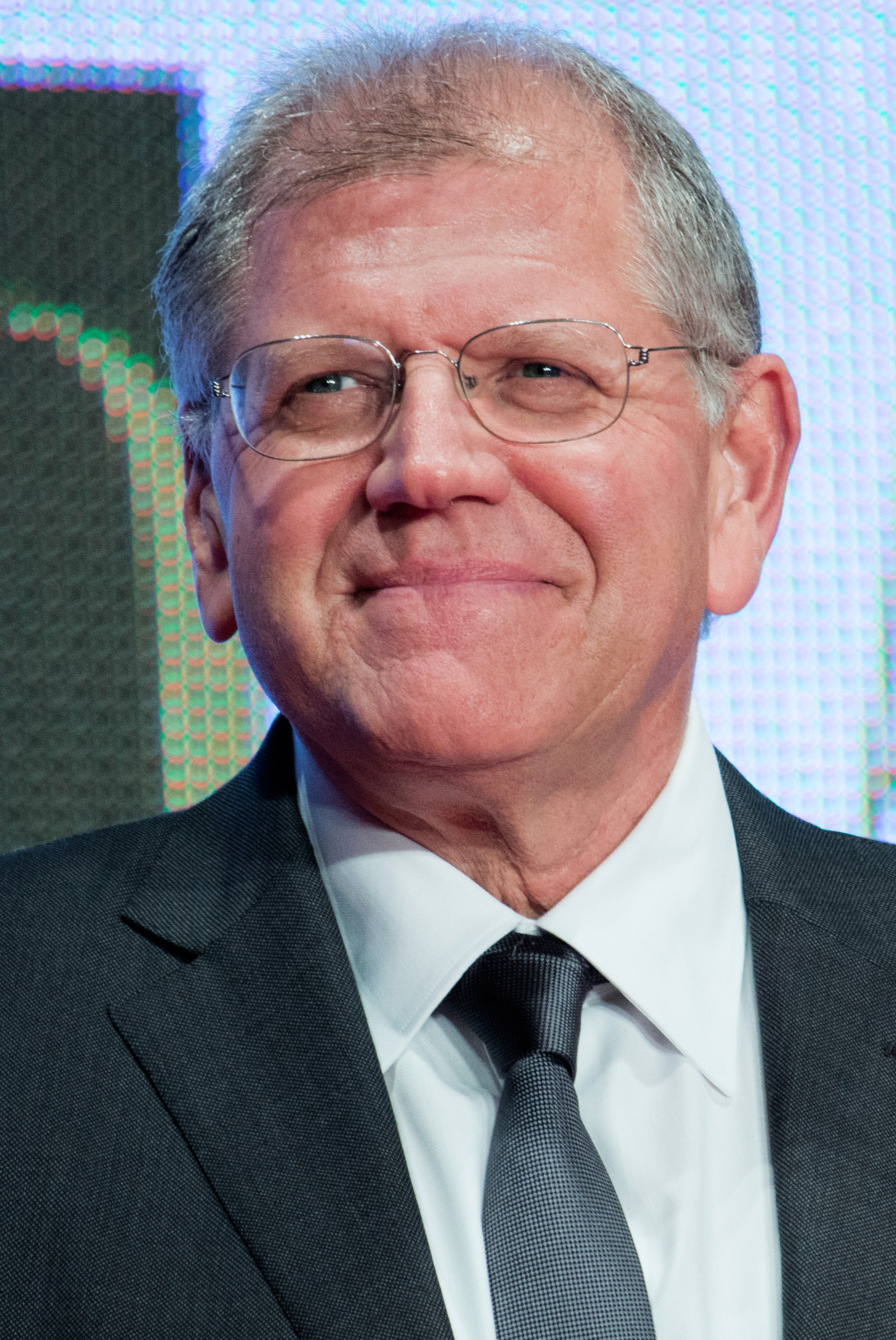
Robert Zemeckis

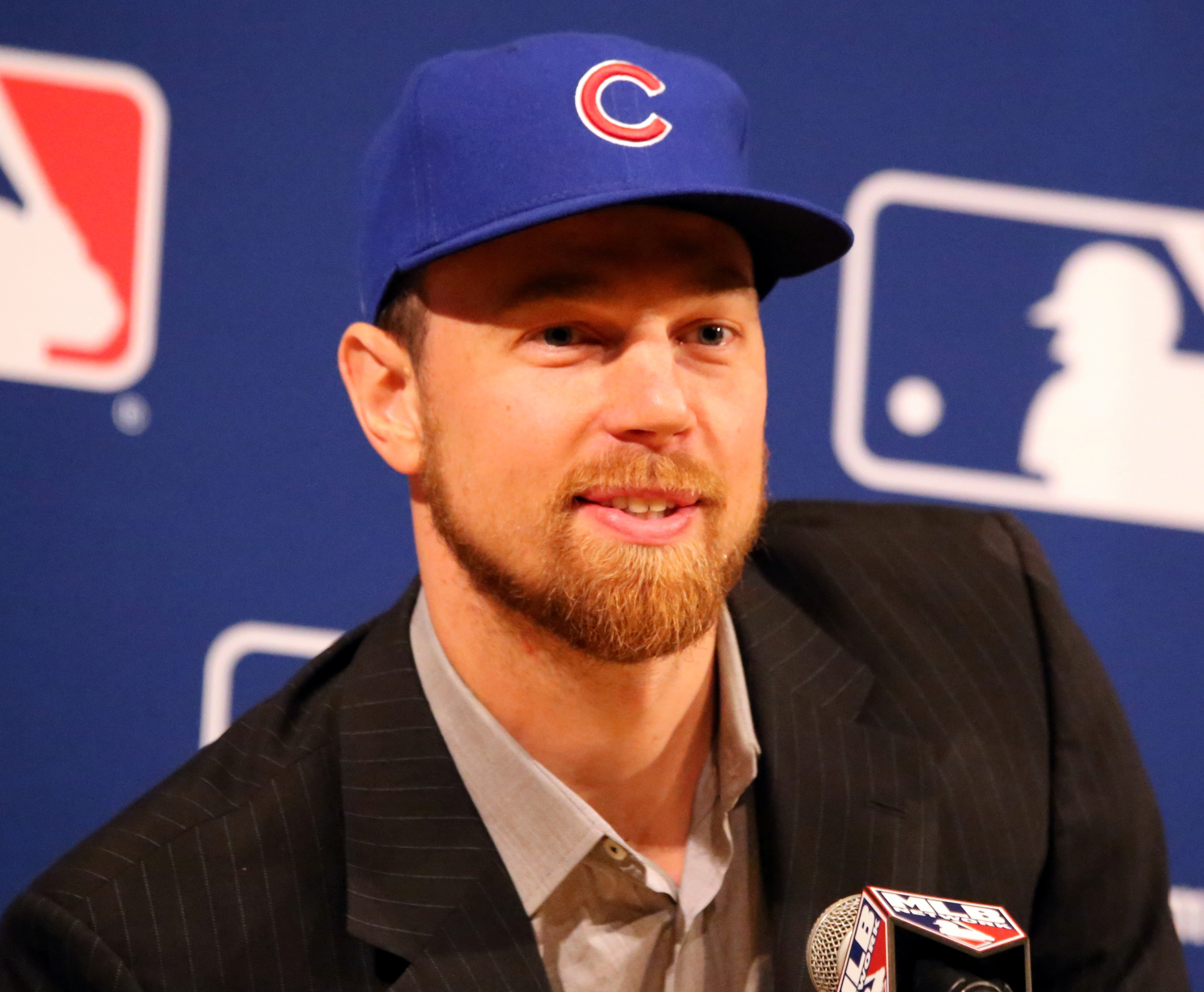
Ben Zobrist

- Florian ZaBach, musician and television personality
- Courtney Zablocki, luge, fourth place at 2006 Turin Olympics
- Jacob Zachar, actor, Greek
- James Zagel, judge, novelist
- Paula Zahn, journalist, TV personality, On the Case with Paula Zahn (born in Nebraska)
- Timothy Zahn, science-fiction author
- Robin Zander, musician with Cheap Trick (born in Wisconsin)
- Billy Zane, producer, director and actor, Titanic, The Phantom, Dead Calm, Only You, Sniper, Tombstone
- Charles S. Zane, judge, associate of Abe Lincoln (born in New Jersey)
- Lisa Zane, actress, L.A. Law, Biker Mice from Mars, Roar
- John Zaremba, actor, I Led Three Lives, The Time Tunnel, Ben Casey
- Agnes Zawadzki, figure skater, 2010 U.S. junior champion
- Jed Zayner, professional soccer player
- Tom Zbikowski, defensive back for Notre Dame and Baltimore Ravens
- Larry Zbyszko, pro wrestler
- Robert Z'Dar, actor, producer
- Joe Zdeb, outfielder for Kansas City Royals 1977–79
- Kara Zediker, actress
- Stephen A. Zeff, accounting historian
- John D. Zeglis, president of AT&T
- Bill Zehme, magazine writer and author
- Alfred Zeisler, film director
- Fannie Bloomfield Zeisler, pianist (born in Austria)
- Zeke Zekley, cartoonist
- Pam Zekman, Pulitzer Prize-winning investigative journalist
- Sarah Zelenka, world champion rower, fourth at 2012 Olympics
- Sam Zell, real estate entrepreneur, Tribune Company chairman
- Bob Zeman, pro football player and coach
- Robert Zemeckis, film director, Forrest Gump, Cast Away, Who Framed Roger Rabbit, the Back to the Future films
- Colleen Zenk, actress, As the World Turns
- Warren Zevon, rock musician, singer-songwriter, "Werewolves of London"
- Jeff Zgonina, defensive lineman for seven NFL teams
- Howard Zieff, film and TV commercial director, The Main Event, Private Benjamin, My Girl
- Florenz Ziegfeld, Broadway impresario, creator of Ziegfeld Follies
- Alma Ziegler, pro baseball player
- Brad Ziegler, MLB pitcher 2008–18 (born in Kansas)
- Zach Ziemek, Olympic decathlete
- Benny Zientara, MLB infielder 1941–48
- Lester Ziffren, screenwriter
- Mike Zimmer, head coach of Minnesota Vikings 2014–22
- Frederick Hinde Zimmerman, banker and land owner
- Jacob Zimmerman, editor, politician (born in Pennsylvania)
- Mary Zimmerman, Tony Award-winning director (born in Nebraska)
- Mary Beth Zimmerman, golfer, four-time Women's U.S. Amateur champion
- Bob Zimny, lineman for 1947 NFL champion Chicago Cardinals
- Bud Zipfel, first baseman for Washington Senators
- Patricia Zipprodt, costume designer
- Adrian Zmed, actor, TV personality, T. J. Hooker, Grease 2
- Ben Zobrist, MLB second baseman 2006–19, two-time World Series champion
- Robert Zoellick, president of World Bank 2007–12
- Rick Zombo, hockey player for Detroit Red Wings, St. Louis Blues
- Billy Zoom, guitarist for band X
- Chris Zorich, lineman for Notre Dame and Chicago Bears
- Louis Zorich, actor, musician, Mad About You, Brooklyn Bridge
- Anthony E. Zuiker, creator of CSI
- Jim Zulevic, actor, comedian, radio host, TV writer
- Robert Zuppke, football coach for University of Illinois 1913–41, College Football Hall of Fame (born in Germany)
- Jack Zuta, organized crime figure (born in Russia)
- Edward Zwick, film director, Glory, The Last Samurai, Legends of the Fall, Love & Other Drugs, Defiance
- Tony Zych, MLB pitcher 2015–17

== 0–9 ==
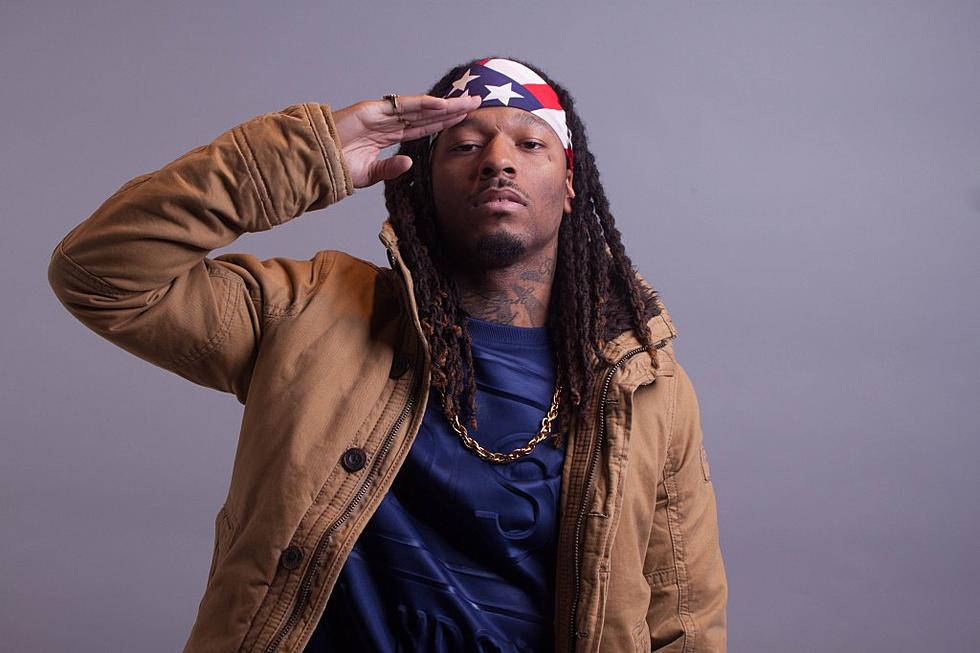
Montana-of-300

Montana of 300, rapper

== See also ==
- List of Illinois suffragists
- Lists of Americans

== Sources ==
- Bateman N, Selby P, Hostetter CL (1913). Bateman N, Selby P, Hostetter CL (eds.). Historical Encyclopedia of Illinois. Vol. 2 – via Google Books.
- Katchmer, George A. (2009). A Biographical Dictionary of Silent Film Western Actors and Actresses. McFarland. ISBN 9781476609058. OCLC 909773565. "...born in Morrison, Illinois, on January 23, 1872...."
- Leszczak, Bob (2015). Encyclopedia of Pop Music Aliases, 1950-2000. London: Rowman & Littlefield. ISBN 978-1-4422-4007-0 – via Google Books (preview).
- Sužiedélis, Saulius (2011). Historical Dictionary of Lithuania (2nd ed.). Lanham, Maryland: Scarecrow Press (Rowman & Littlefield). ISBN 978-0-8108-4914-3 – via Google Books (preview).
- Willard FE, Rice Livermore MA, eds. (1893). A Woman of the Century. Moulton – via Internet Archive (free eBook).
