= Ronald Reagan =

President of the United States from 1981 to 1989

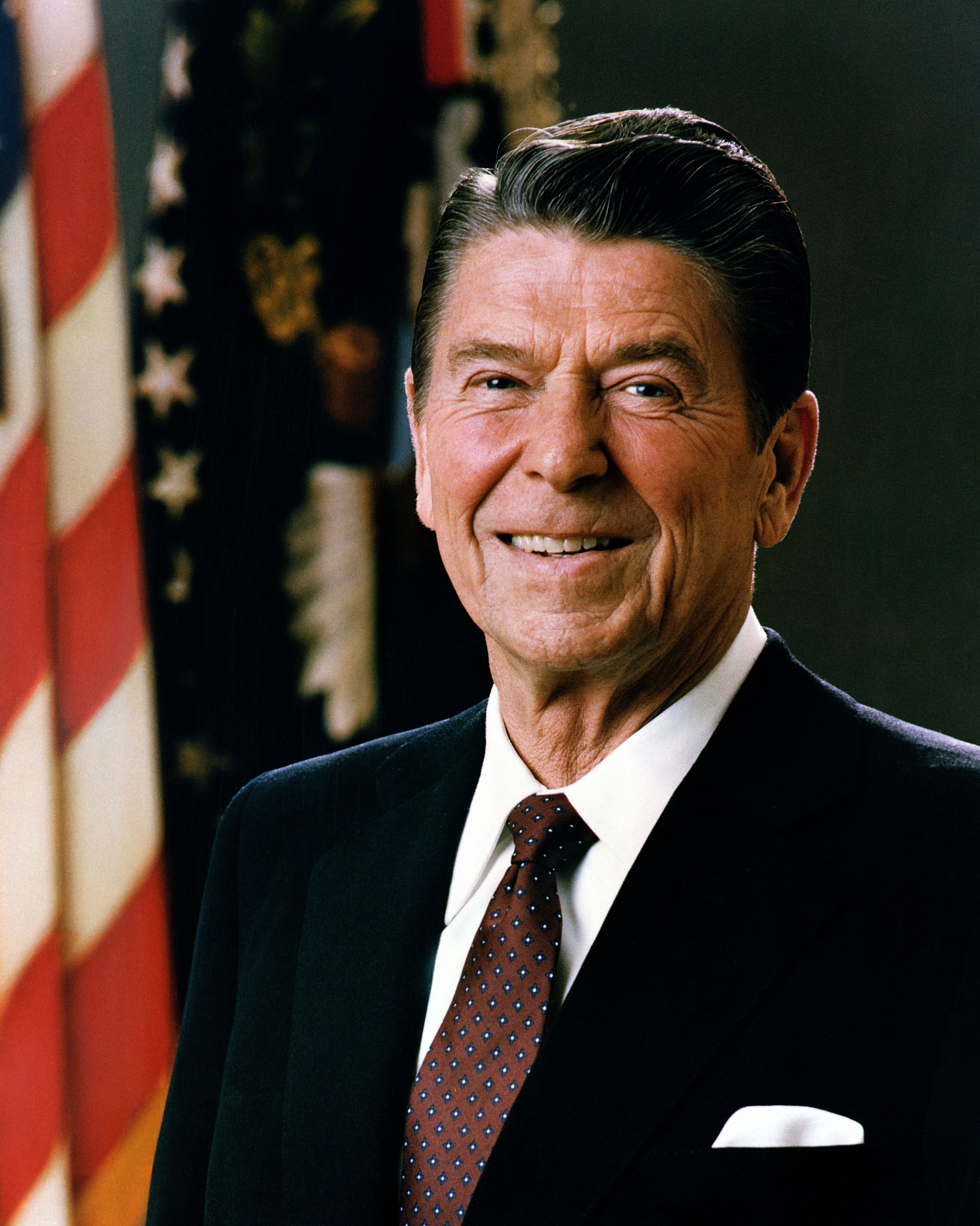
- Official portrait, 1981

40th President of the United States
- In office January 20, 1981 – January 20, 1989
- Vice President: George H. W. Bush
- Preceded by: Jimmy Carter
- Succeeded by: George H. W. Bush

33rd Governor of California
- In office January 2, 1967 – January 6, 1975
- Lieutenant: Robert Finch (1967–1969); Edwin Reinecke (1969–1974); John L. Harmer (1974–1975)
- Preceded by: Pat Brown
- Succeeded by: Jerry Brown

Chair of the Republican Governors Association
- In office December 4, 1968 – December 13, 1969
- Preceded by: John Chafee
- Succeeded by: Raymond P. Shafer

President of the Screen Actors Guild
- In office November 16, 1959 – June 7, 1960
- Preceded by: Howard Keel
- Succeeded by: George Chandler
- In office March 10, 1947 – November 10, 1952
- Preceded by: Robert Montgomery
- Succeeded by: Walter Pidgeon

Personal details
- Born: February 6, 1911 Tampico, Illinois, U.S.
- Died: June 5, 2004 (aged 93) Los Angeles, California, U.S.
- Resting place: Ronald Reagan Presidential Library
- Party: Republican (from 1962)
- Other political affiliations: Democratic (until 1962)
- Spouses: Jane Wyman (m. 1940; div. 1949); Nancy Davis (m. 1952)
- Children: 5, including Maureen, Michael, Patti, and Ron
- Parents: Jack Reagan (father); Nelle Wilson (mother)
- Relatives: Neil Reagan (brother)
- Education: Eureka College (BA)
- Occupation: Politician; actor; sports broadcaster; union leader
- Awards: Full list
- Website: Presidential Foundation; Presidential library
- Nickname: "The Great Communicator"

Military service
- Allegiance: United States
- Service: United States Army; Army Reserve; Army Air Forces
- Years of service: 1937–1942 (reserve); 1942–1945 (active)
- Rank: Captain
- Unit: 322nd Cavalry Regiment; 323rd Cavalry Regiment; 18th AAF Base Unit
- Wars: World War II
- Reagan's voice Reagan on civil rights Recorded June 15, 1985

Ronald Wilson Reagan (Note: Pronounced /ˈreɪɡən/ RAY-gən) (February 6, 1911 – June 5, 2004) was an American politician and actor who served as the 40th president of the United States from 1981 to 1989. A member of the Republican Party, he became an important figure in the American conservative movement. The period encompassing his presidency is known as the Reagan era.

Born in Tampico, Illinois, Reagan graduated from Eureka College in 1932 and was hired the next year as a sports broadcaster in Iowa. In 1937, he moved to California where he became a well-known film actor. During his acting career, Reagan was president of the Screen Actors Guild twice from 1947 to 1952 and from 1959 to 1960. In the 1950s, he hosted General Electric Theater and worked as a motivational speaker for General Electric. During the 1964 presidential election, Reagan's "A Time for Choosing" speech launched his rise as a leading conservative figure. After being elected governor of California in 1966, he raised state taxes, turned the state budget deficit into a surplus, and implemented crackdowns on university protests. Following his loss to Gerald Ford in the 1976 Republican Party presidential primaries, Reagan won the Republican Party's nomination and then obtained a landslide victory over President Jimmy Carter in the 1980 presidential election.

In his first term as president, Reagan began implementing "Reaganomics", a policy involving economic deregulation and cuts to both taxes and government spending during a period of stagflation. On the world stage, he escalated the arms race, increased military spending, shifted Cold War policy away from détente, and ordered the 1983 invasion of Grenada. Other notable events during Reagan's first term included his survival of an assassination attempt, a well-publicized fight with public-sector labor unions, an expansion of the war on drugs, and his administration's slow response to the AIDS epidemic. In the 1984 presidential election, he was elected to a second term by defeating former vice president Walter Mondale in one of the largest landslide victories in American history. Foreign affairs dominated his second term, including the 1986 bombing of Libya, the secret and illegal sale of arms to Iran to fund the Contras, and negotiations with Soviet leader Mikhail Gorbachev that culminated in the Intermediate-Range Nuclear Forces Treaty.

Reagan left the presidency in 1989 with the American economy having experienced a significant reduction of inflation, a decline in the unemployment rate, and the longest peacetime economic expansion in US history at that time. The national debt had nearly tripled since 1981 as a result of his tax cuts and increased military spending outweighing his cuts to domestic discretionary spending. Reagan's foreign policies also contributed to the end of the Cold War. Although he planned an active post-presidency, those plans were hindered after he was diagnosed with Alzheimer's disease in 1994. His physical and mental capacities gradually deteriorated, leading to his death in 2004. His tenure constituted a realignment toward conservative policies in the United States, and he is often considered an icon of American conservatism. Historical rankings of US presidents have typically placed Reagan in the middle to upper tier, and his post-presidential approval ratings by the general public have generally remained high.

== Early life ==
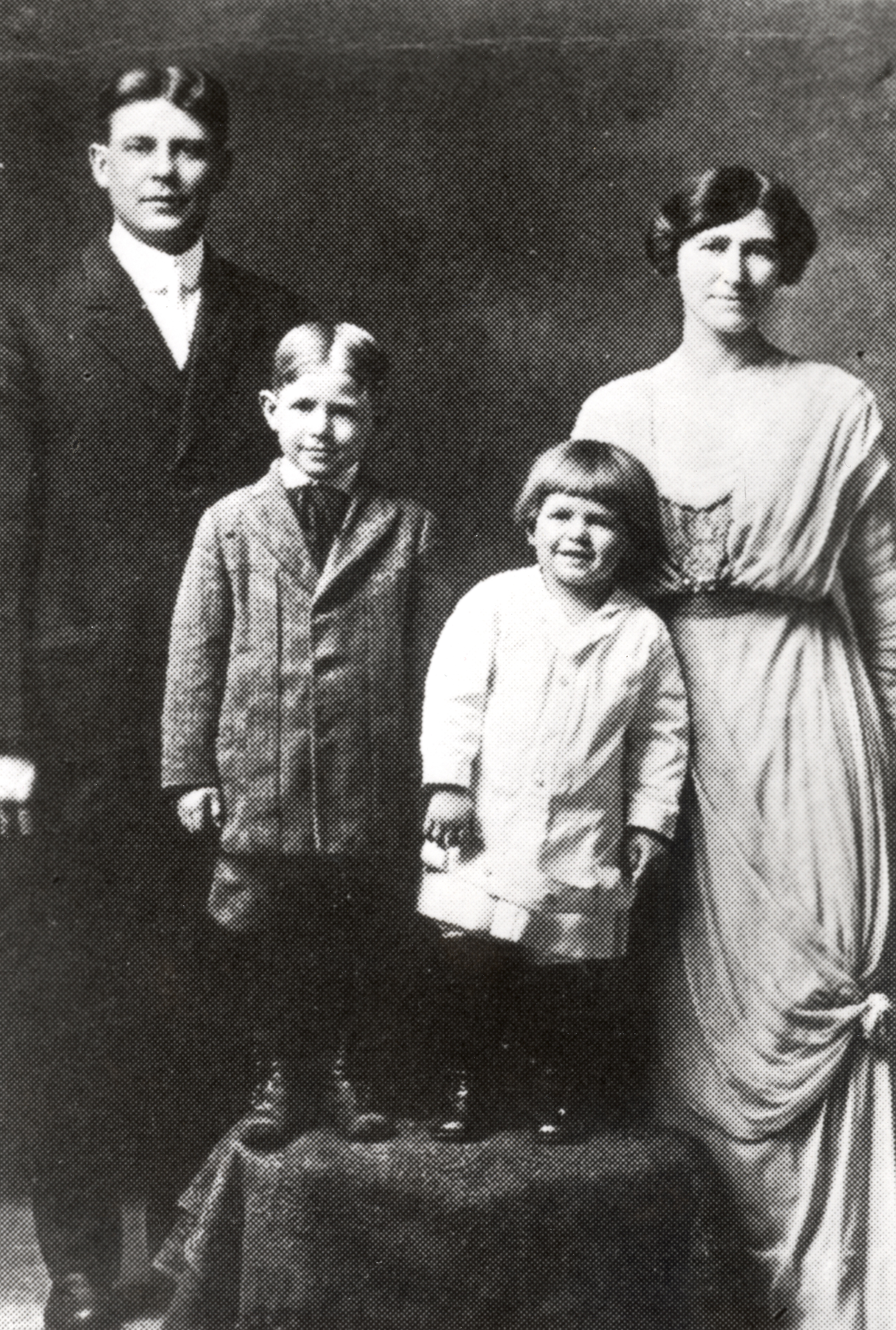
From left to right: Jack (father), Neil, Ronald, and Nelle (mother) (c. 1915)

Ronald Wilson Reagan was born on February 6, 1911, in an apartment in Tampico, Illinois, the younger son of Nelle Clyde Wilson and Jack Reagan. Nelle was committed to the Disciples of Christ, which believed in the Social Gospel. She led prayer meetings and ran mid-week prayers at her church when the pastor was out of town. Reagan credited her spiritual influence and he became a Christian. According to American political figure Stephen Vaughn, Reagan's values came from his pastor, and the First Christian Church's religious, economic and social positions "coincided with the words, if not the beliefs of the latter-day Reagan". Jack focused on making money to take care of the family, but this was complicated by his alcoholism. Reagan had an older brother, Neil. The family lived in Chicago, Galesburg, and Monmouth before returning to Tampico. In 1920, they settled in Dixon, Illinois, living in a house near the H. C. Pitney Variety Store Building. Reagan attended Dixon High School, where he developed interests in drama and football. His first job was as a lifeguard at the Rock River in Lowell Park.

In 1928, Reagan began attending Eureka College, which Nelle approved because of its affiliation with the Disciples of Christ. He was a mediocre student who participated in cheerleading, sports, drama, and campus politics. He became student body president and joined a student strike that resulted in the college president's resignation. Reagan was initiated as a member of Tau Kappa Epsilon fraternity and served as president of the local chapter. Reagan played at the guard position for the 1930 and 1931 Eureka Red Devils football teams and recalled a time when two Black teammates were refused service at a segregated hotel; he invited them to his parents' home nearby in Dixon and his parents welcomed them. At the time, his parents' stance on racial questions was unusually progressive in Dixon. Reagan himself had grown up with very few Black Americans and felt oblivious to racial discrimination.

== Military service ==
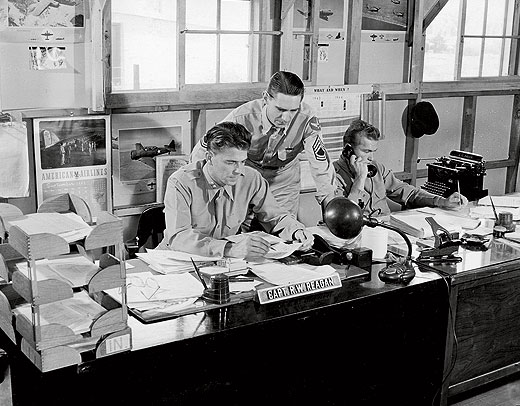
Reagan at Fort Roach, between 1943 and 1944

In April 1937, Reagan enlisted in the United States Army Reserve. He was assigned as a private in Des Moines' 322nd Cavalry Regiment and reassigned to second lieutenant in the Officers Reserve Corps. He later became a part of the 323rd Cavalry Regiment in California. As relations between the United States and Japan worsened, Reagan was ordered for active duty while he was filming Kings Row. Wasserman and Warner Bros. lawyers successfully sent draft deferments to complete the film in October 1941. However, to avoid accusations of Reagan being a draft dodger, the studio let him go in April 1942.

Reagan reported for duty with severe near-sightedness. His first assignment was at Fort Mason as a liaison officer, a role that allowed him to transfer to the United States Army Air Forces (AAF). Reagan became an AAF public relations officer and was assigned to the 18th AAF Base Unit in Culver City where he felt that it was "impossible to remove an incompetent or lazy worker" due to what he felt was "the incompetence, the delays, and inefficiencies" of the federal bureaucracy. Despite this, Reagan participated in the Provisional Task Force Show Unit in Burbank and continued to make theatrical films. He was also ordered to temporary duty in New York City to participate in the sixth War Loan Drive before being reassigned to Fort MacArthur until his discharge on December 9, 1945, as a captain. Throughout his military service, Reagan produced over 400 training films.

== Entertainment career ==
=== Radio and film ===
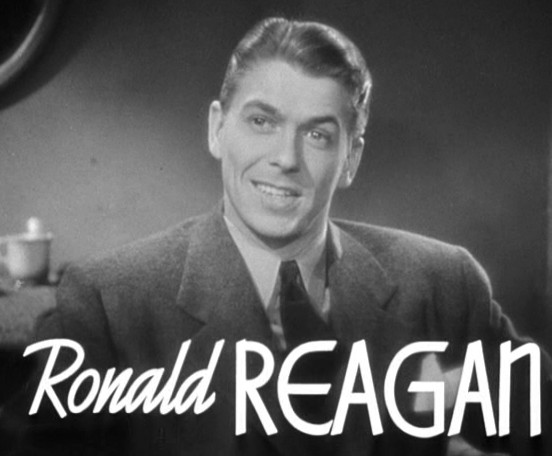
Dark Victory (1939)

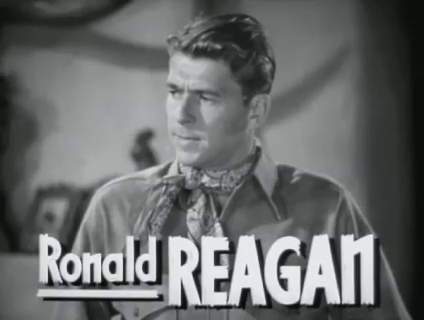
The Bad Man (1941)

After obtaining a Bachelor of Arts in economics and sociology from Eureka College in 1932, Reagan took a job in Davenport, Iowa, as a sports broadcaster for four football games in the Big Ten Conference. He then worked for WHO radio in Des Moines as a broadcaster for the Chicago Cubs. His specialty was creating play-by-play accounts of games using only basic descriptions that the station received by wire as the games were in progress. Simultaneously, he often expressed his opposition to racism. In 1936, while traveling with the Cubs to their spring training in California, Reagan took a screen test that led to a seven-year contract with Warner Bros. Pictures.

Reagan arrived in Hollywood in 1937, debuting in Love Is on the Air (1937). Using a simple and direct approach to acting and following his directors' instructions, he made thirty films, mostly B films, before beginning military service in April 1942. He broke out of these types of films by portraying George Gipp in Knute Rockne, All American (1940), which would be rejuvenated when reporters called Reagan "the Gipper" while he campaigned for president. Reagan starred in Kings Row (1942) as a leg amputee; this performance was considered his best by many critics. Reagan became a star, with Gallup polls placing him "in the top 100 stars" from 1941 to 1942.

World War II interrupted the movie stardom that Reagan would never be able to achieve again as Warner Bros. became uncertain about his ability to generate ticket sales. Reagan, who had a limited acting range, was dissatisfied with the roles he received. Lew Wasserman renegotiated his contract with his studio, allowing him to also make films with Universal Pictures, Paramount Pictures, and RKO Pictures as a freelancer. Reagan appeared in multiple western films, something that had been denied to him while working at Warner Bros. In 1952, he ended his relationship with Warner Bros., but went on to appear in a total of 53 films, his last being The Killers (1964).

=== Screen Actors Guild presidency ===
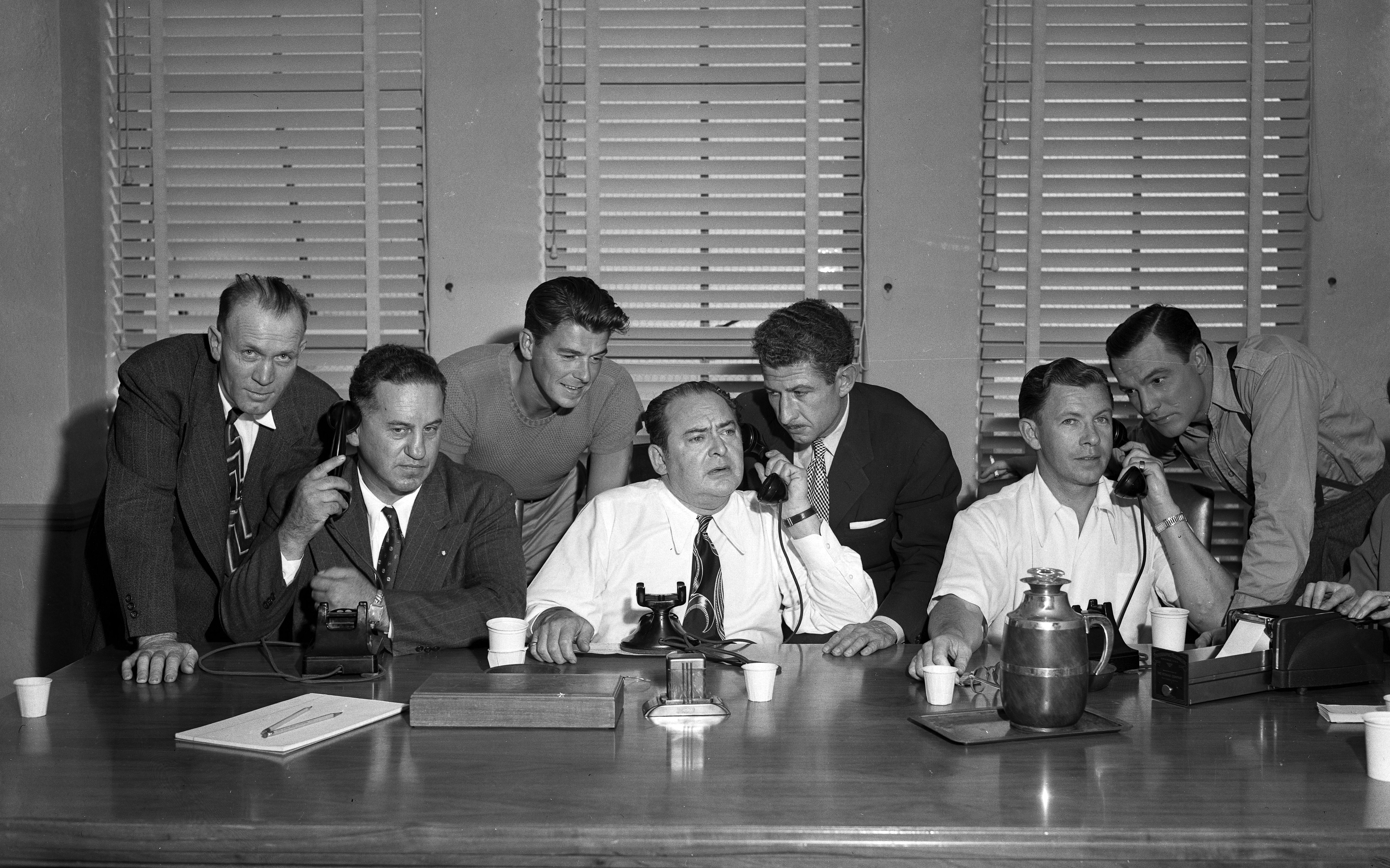
Seven actors and studio workers during a telephone conference held in the aftermath of Hollywood Black Friday in which American Federation of Labor officials denied issuing a "clarification" which set off the film strike, October 26, 1946. (L-R): James Skelton, Herbert Sorrell, Ronald Reagan, Edward Arnold, Roy Tindall, George Murphy, and Gene Kelly.

When Robert Montgomery resigned as president of the Screen Actors Guild (SAG) on March 10, 1947, Reagan was elected to that position in a special election. Reagan's first tenure saw various labor–management disputes, the Hollywood blacklist, and the Taft–Hartley Act's implementation. Reagan aligned the union with the studios against the Conference of Studio Unions in the aftermath of the Hollywood Black Friday strike. In The Invisible Bridge, Rick Perlstein wrote that Reagan's actions lent legitimacy to the studio's efforts to crush the more radical union by giving liberals in SAG who did not want to strike "a story that turned them into moral innocents instead of scabs". On April 10, the Federal Bureau of Investigation (FBI) interviewed Reagan and he provided the names of actors whom he believed to be communist sympathizers. During a House Un-American Activities Committee hearing, Reagan testified that some guild members were associated with the Communist Party and that he was well-informed about a "jurisdictional strike". When asked if he was aware of communist efforts within the Screen Writers Guild, he called information about the efforts "hearsay". Reagan resigned as SAG president November 10, 1952, but remained on the board.

The SAG fought with film producers for the right to receive residual payments, and on November 16, 1959, the board elected Reagan SAG president for the second time. Reagan managed to secure payments for actors whose theatrical films had been released between 1948 and 1959 and subsequently televised. The producers were initially required to pay the actors fees, but they ultimately settled instead for providing pensions and paying residuals for films made after 1959. Reagan resigned from the SAG presidency on June 7, 1960, and also left the board.

=== Marriages and children ===
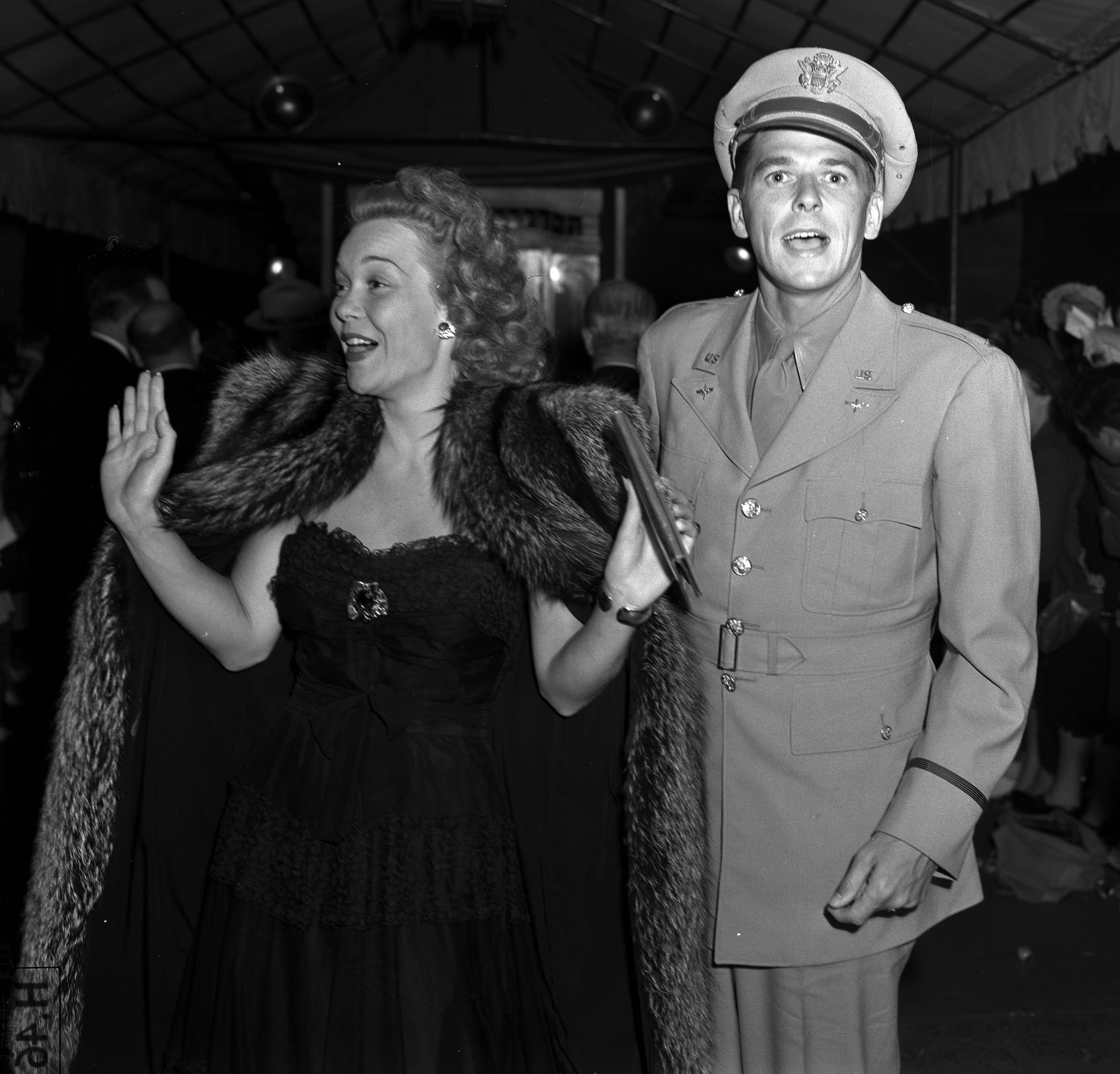
Reagan and Jane Wyman, 1942

Ronald and Nancy Reagan, 1952

In January 1940, Reagan married Jane Wyman, his co-star in the 1938 film Brother Rat. Together, they had two biological daughters: Maureen in 1941, and Christine in 1947 (born prematurely and died the following day). They adopted one son, Michael, in 1945. Wyman filed for divorce in June 1948. She was uninterested in politics, and occasionally recriminated, reconciled, and separated with him. Although Reagan was unprepared, the divorce was finalized in July 1949. Later that year, Reagan met Nancy Davis after she contacted him in his capacity as the SAG president about her name appearing on a communist blacklist in Hollywood; she had been mistaken for another Nancy Davis. They married in March 1952, and had two children, Patti in October 1952, and Ron in May 1958.

=== Television ===
Reagan became the host of MCA Inc. television production General Electric Theater at Wasserman's recommendation. It featured multiple guest stars, and Ronald and Nancy Reagan, continuing to use her stage name Nancy Davis, acted together in three episodes. When asked how Reagan was able to recruit such stars to appear on the show during television's infancy, he replied, "Good stories, top direction, production quality". However, the viewership declined in the 1960s and the show was canceled in 1962. In 1965, Reagan became the host of another MCA production, Death Valley Days.

== Early political activities ==
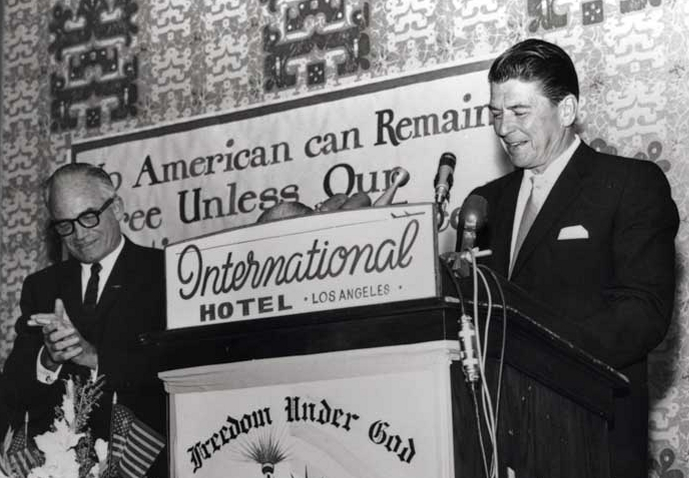
Reagan campaigning with Barry Goldwater, 1964

Reagan began his political career as a Democrat, viewing Franklin D. Roosevelt as "a true hero". He joined the American Veterans Committee and Hollywood Independent Citizens Committee of the Arts, Sciences and Professions (HICCASP), worked with the AFL–CIO to fight right-to-work laws, and continued to speak out against racism when he was in Hollywood. In 1945, Reagan planned to lead an HICCASP anti-nuclear rally, but Warner Bros. prevented him from going. In 1946, he appeared in a radio program called Operation Terror to speak out against rising Ku Klux Klan activity, calling it a "capably organized systematic campaign of fascist violence and intimidation and horror". Reagan supported Harry S. Truman in the 1948 presidential election, and Helen Gahagan Douglas for the US Senate in 1950. It was Reagan's belief that communism was a powerful backstage influence in Hollywood that led him to rally his friends against them.

Reagan began shifting to the right when he supported the presidential campaigns of Dwight D. Eisenhower in 1952 and Richard Nixon in 1960. When Reagan was contracted by General Electric (GE), he gave speeches to their employees. His speeches had a positive take on free markets. In 1961, Reagan adapted his speeches into another speech to criticize Medicare. In his view, its legislation would have meant "the end of individual freedom in the United States". In 1962, Reagan was dropped by GE, and he formally registered as a Republican.

In the 1964 US presidential election, Reagan gave a speech for presidential contender Barry Goldwater that was eventually referred to as "A Time for Choosing". Reagan argued that the Founding Fathers "knew that governments don't control things. And they knew when a government sets out to do that, it must use force and coercion to achieve its purpose" and that "We've been told increasingly that we must choose between left or right". Even though the speech was not enough to turn around the faltering Goldwater campaign, it increased Reagan's profile among conservatives. David S. Broder and Stephen H. Hess called it "the most successful national political debut since William Jennings Bryan electrified the 1896 Democratic convention with his famous 'Cross of Gold' address".

=== 1966 California gubernatorial election ===
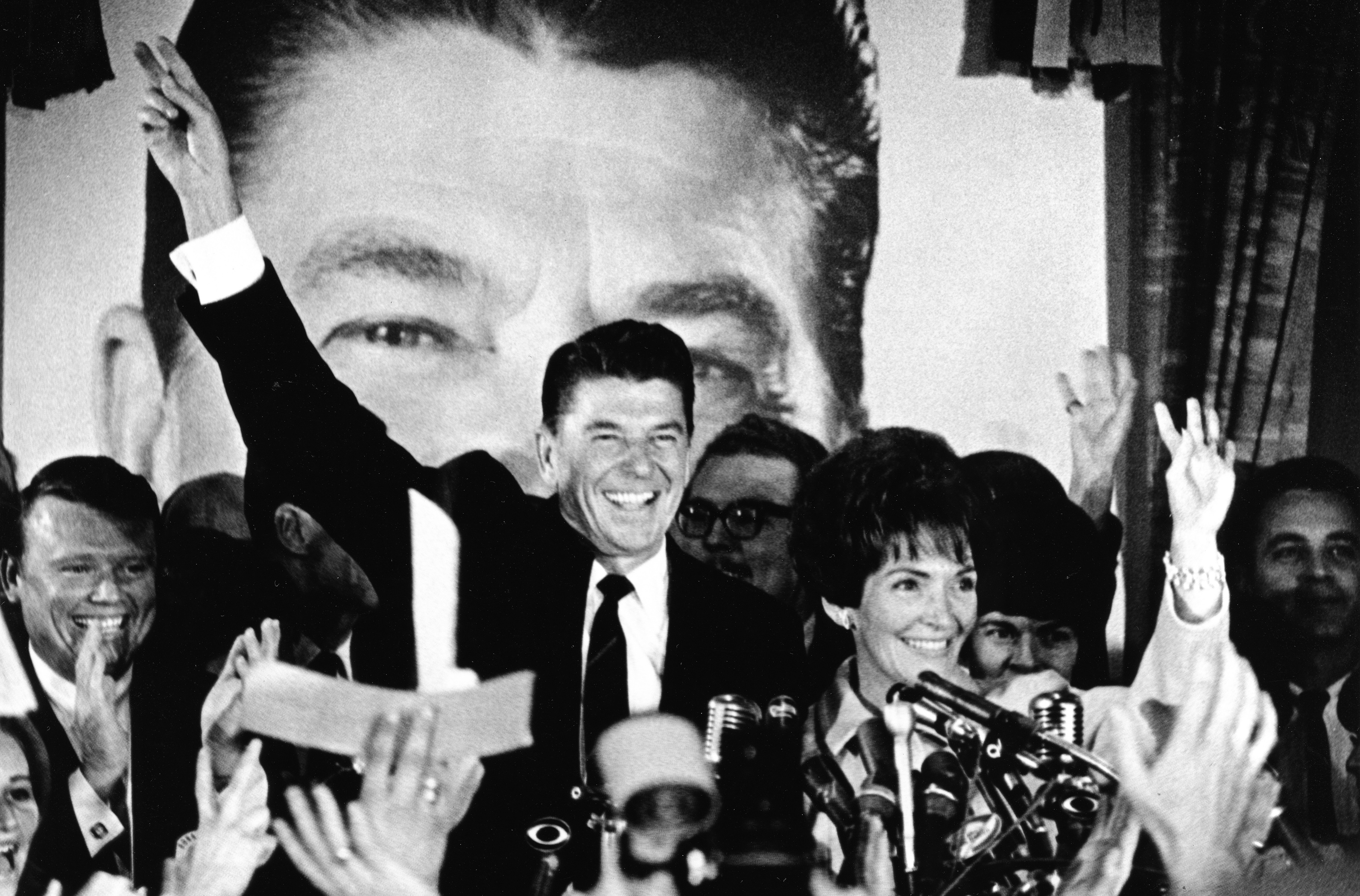
Ronald and Nancy Reagan celebrating his gubernatorial election victory, November 1966

In January 1966, Reagan announced his candidacy for the California governorship, repeating his stances on individual freedom and big government. When he met with black Republicans in March, he was criticized for opposing the Civil Rights Act of 1964. Reagan responded that bigotry was not in his nature and later argued that certain provisions of the act infringed upon the rights of property owners. After the Supreme Court of California ruled that the initiative that repealed the Rumford Act was unconstitutional in May, he voiced his support for the act's repeal, but later preferred amending it. In the Republican primary, Reagan defeated George Christopher, a moderate Republican who William F. Buckley Jr. thought had painted Reagan as extreme.

Reagan's general election opponent, incumbent governor Pat Brown, attempted to label Reagan as an extremist. Reagan portrayed himself as a political outsider, and charged Brown as responsible for the Watts riots and lenient on crime. In numerous speeches, Reagan "hit the Brown administration about high taxes, uncontrolled spending, the radicals at the University of California, Berkeley, and the need for accountability in government". Meanwhile, many in the press perceived Reagan as "monumentally ignorant of state issues", though Lou Cannon said that Reagan benefited from an appearance he and Brown made on Meet the Press in September. Reagan won the governorship with 58% of the vote compared to Brown's 42%.

== California governorship (1967–1975) ==
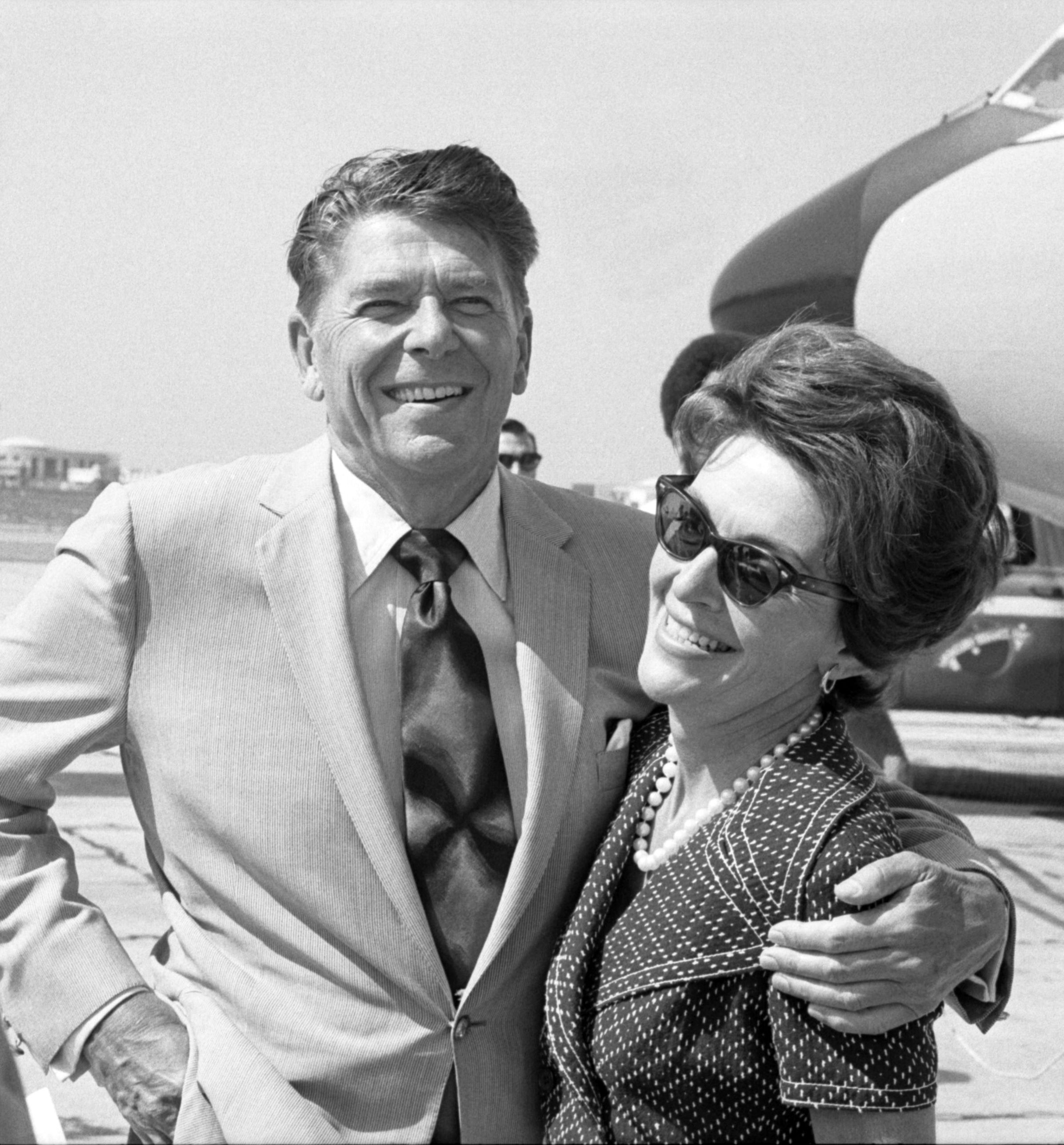
The Reagans in 1972

Brown had spent much of California's funds on new programs, prompting them to use accrual accounting to avoid raising taxes. Consequently, it generated a larger deficit, and Reagan called for reduced government spending and tax hikes to balance the budget. He worked with Jesse M. Unruh on securing tax increases and promising future property tax cuts. This caused some conservatives to accuse Reagan of betraying his principles. As a result, taxes on sales, banks, corporate profits, inheritances, liquor, and cigarettes jumped. Kevin Starr states Reagan "gave Californians the biggest tax hike in their history—and got away with it". In the 1970 gubernatorial election, Unruh used Reagan's tax policy against him, saying it disproportionally favored the wealthy. Reagan countered that he was still committed to reducing property taxes. By 1973, the budget had a surplus, which Reagan preferred "to give back to the people".

In 1967, Reagan reacted to the Black Panther Party's strategy of copwatching by signing the Mulford Act to prohibit the public carrying of firearms. The act was California's most restrictive piece of gun control legislation, with critics saying that it was "overreacting to the political activism of organizations such as the Black Panthers". The act marked the beginning of both modern legislation and public attitude studies on gun control. Reagan also signed the 1967 Therapeutic Abortion Act that allowed abortions in the cases of rape and incest when a doctor determined the birth would impair the physical or mental health of the mother. He later expressed regret over signing it, saying that he was unaware of the mental health provision. He believed that doctors were interpreting the provision loosely, resulting in more abortions.

After Reagan won the 1966 election, he and his advisors planned a run in the 1968 Republican presidential primaries. He ran as an unofficial candidate to cut into Nixon's southern support and be a compromise candidate if there were to be a brokered convention. He won California's delegates, but Nixon secured enough delegates for the nomination.

Reagan had previously been critical of former governor Brown and university administrators for tolerating student demonstrations in the city of Berkeley, making it a major theme in his campaigning. On February 5, 1969, Reagan declared a state of emergency in response to ongoing protests and violence at the University of California, Berkeley, and sent in the California Highway Patrol. In May 1969, these officers, along with local officers from Berkeley and Alameda county, clashed with protestors over a site known as the People's Park. One student was shot and killed while many police officers and two reporters were injured. Reagan then commanded the state National Guard troops to occupy Berkeley for seventeen days to subdue the protesters, allowing other students to attend class safely. In February 1970, violent protests broke out near the University of California, Santa Barbara, where he once again deployed the National Guard. On April 7, Reagan defended his policies regarding campus protests, saying, "If it takes a bloodbath, let's get it over with. No more appeasement".

During his victorious reelection campaign in 1970, Reagan, remaining critical of government, promised to prioritize welfare reform. He was concerned that the programs were disincentivizing work and that the growing welfare rolls would lead to both an unbalanced budget and another big tax hike in 1972. At the same time, the Federal Reserve increased interest rates to combat inflation, putting the American economy in a mild recession. Reagan worked with Bob Moretti to tighten up the eligibility requirements so that the financially needy could continue receiving payments. This was only accomplished after Reagan softened his criticism of Nixon's Family Assistance Plan. Nixon then lifted regulations to shepherd California's experiment. In 1976, the Employment Development Department published a report suggesting that the experiment that ran from 1971 to 1974 was unsuccessful.

Reagan declined to run for the governorship in 1974 and it was won by Pat Brown's son, Jerry. Reagan's governorship, as professor Gary K. Clabaugh writes, saw public schools deteriorate due to his opposition to additional basic education funding. As for higher education, journalist William Trombley believed that the budget cuts Reagan enacted damaged Berkeley's student-faculty ratio and research. The homicide rate doubled and armed robbery rates rose by even more during Reagan's eight years, even with the many laws Reagan signed to try toughening criminal sentencing and reforming the criminal justice system. Reagan strongly supported capital punishment, but his efforts to enforce it were thwarted by People v. Anderson in 1972. According to his son, Michael, Reagan said that he regretted signing the Family Law Act that granted no-fault divorces.

== Seeking the presidency (1975–1981) ==
=== 1976 Republican primaries ===
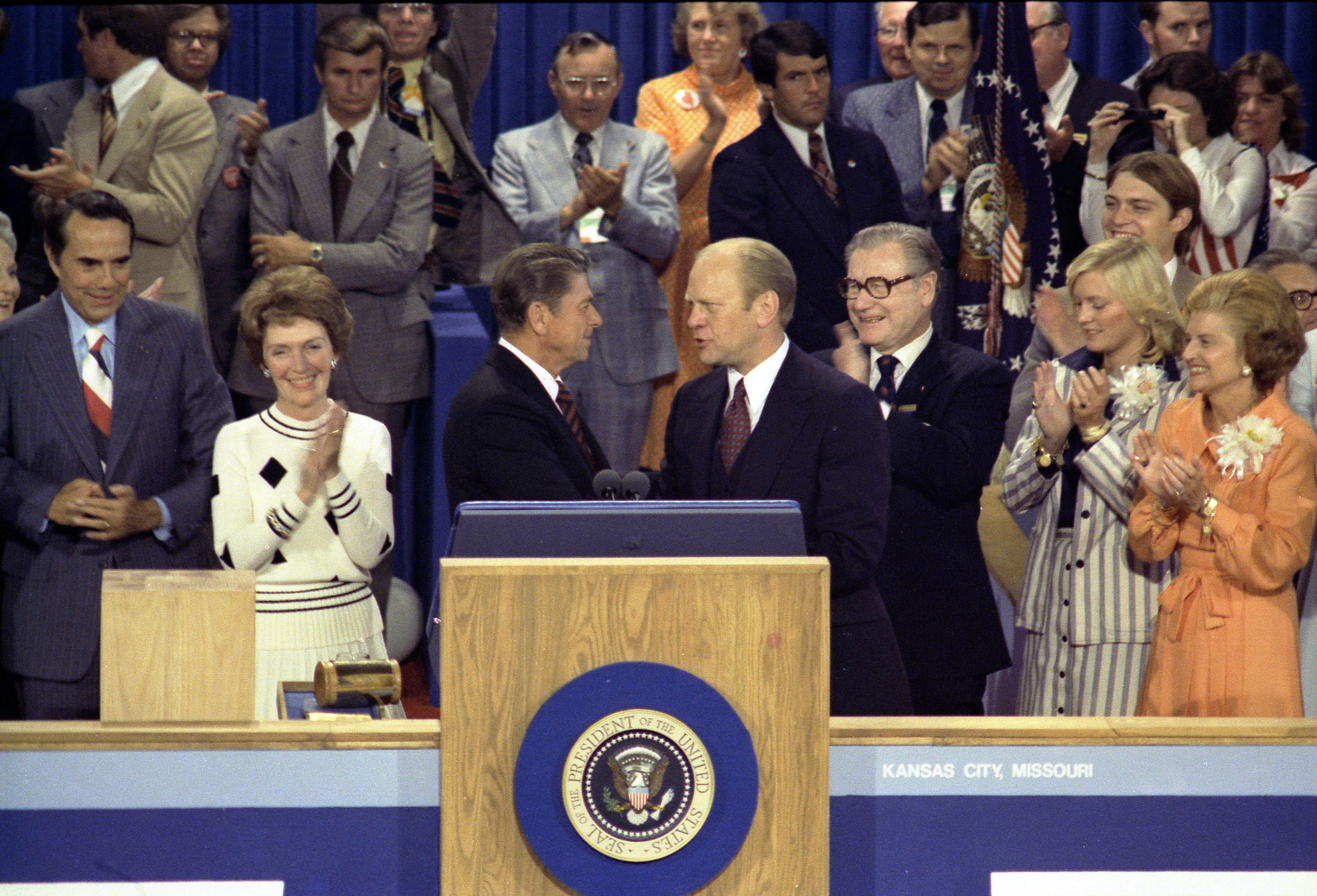
Reagan and Gerald Ford shaking hands on the podium after Reagan narrowly lost the nomination at the 1976 Republican National Convention

Insufficiently conservative to Reagan and many other Republicans, President Gerald Ford suffered from multiple political and economic woes. Ford, running for president, was disappointed to hear him also run. Reagan was strongly critical of détente and Ford's policy of détente with the Soviet Union. He repeated "A Time for Choosing" around the country before announcing his campaign on November 20, 1975, when he discussed economic and social problems, and to a lesser extent, foreign affairs. Both candidates were determined to knock each other out early in the primaries, but Reagan would devastatingly lose the first five primaries beginning with New Hampshire, where he popularized the welfare queen narrative about Linda Taylor, exaggerating her misuse of welfare benefits and igniting voter resentment for welfare reform, but never overtly mentioning her name or race.

In Florida, Reagan used racially coded rhetoric to undermine Food Stamps, referring to recipients as "strapping young buck[s]", and attacked Ford for handing the Panama Canal to Panama's government, while Ford implied that Reagan would end Social Security. Then, in Illinois, Reagan again criticized Ford's policy and his secretary of state, Henry Kissinger. Losing the first five primaries prompted Reagan to desperately win North Carolina's by running a grassroots campaign and uniting with the Jesse Helms political machine that viciously attacked Ford. Reagan won an upset victory, convincing party delegates that Ford's nomination was no longer guaranteed. Reagan won subsequent victories in Texas, Alabama, Georgia, and Indiana with his attacks on social programs, opposition to forced busing to achieve school desegregation, and repeated criticisms of Ford and Kissinger's policies, including détente.

Reagan's concession speech at the 1976 convention

The result was a seesaw battle for the 1,130 delegates required for their party's nomination that neither would reach before the Kansas City convention in August and Ford replacing mentions of détente with Reagan's preferred phrase, "peace through strength". Reagan took John Sears' advice of choosing liberal Richard Schweiker as his running mate, hoping to pry loose of delegates from Pennsylvania and other states, and distract Ford. Instead, conservatives were left alienated, and Ford picked up the remaining uncommitted delegates, earning 1,187 to Reagan's 1,070.

After giving his acceptance speech, Ford invited Reagan to address the convention. Reagan gave an eloquent and stirring speech that overshadowed Ford's own acceptance address, despite being little more than five minutes long. Some delegates later stated that they left the convention wondering if they had voted for the wrong candidate. A contemporary media account stated that if a motion to reconsider the nomination had been in order, it might have passed.

In 1977, Ford told Cannon that Reagan's primary challenge contributed to his own narrow loss to Democrat Jimmy Carter in the 1976 presidential election.

=== 1980 election ===
1980 electoral vote results. Reagan won 489–49.

Reagan emerged as a vocal critic of President Carter in 1977. The Panama Canal Treaty's signing, the 1979 oil crisis, and rise in the interest, inflation and unemployment rates helped set up his 1980 presidential campaign, which he announced on November 13, 1979 with an indictment of the federal government. His announcement stressed his fundamental principles of tax cuts to stimulate the economy and having both a small government and a strong national defense, since he believed the United States was behind the Soviet Union militarily. Heading into 1980, his age became an issue among the press, and the United States was in a severe recession.

In the primaries, Reagan unexpectedly lost the Iowa caucus to George H. W. Bush. Three days before the New Hampshire primary, the Reagan and Bush campaigns agreed to a one-on-one debate sponsored by The Telegraph at Nashua, New Hampshire, but hours before the debate, the Reagan campaign invited other candidates including Bob Dole, John B. Anderson, Howard Baker and Phil Crane. Debate moderator Jon Breen denied seats to the other candidates, asserting that The Telegraph would violate federal campaign contribution laws if it sponsored the debate and changed the ground rules hours before the debate. As a result, the Reagan campaign agreed to pay for the debate. Reagan said that as he was funding the event, he could decide who would participate. During the debate, when Breen was laying out the ground rules and attempting to ask the first question, Reagan interrupted in protest to make an introductory statement and wanted other candidates to be included before the debate began. The moderator asked Bob Malloy, the volume operator, to mute Reagan's microphone. After Breen repeated his demand to Malloy, Reagan furiously replied, "I am paying for this microphone, Mr. Green! [sic]". (Note: Reagan misstated Breen's last name as "Mr. Green".) This turned out to be the turning point of the debate and the primary race. Ultimately, the four additional candidates left, and the debate continued between Reagan and Bush. Reagan's polling numbers improved, and he won the New Hampshire primary by more than 39,000 votes. Soon thereafter, Reagan's opponents began dropping out of the primaries, including Anderson, who left the party to become an independent candidate. Reagan easily captured the presidential nomination and chose Bush as his running mate at the Detroit convention in July.

The general election pitted Reagan against Carter amid the multitude of domestic concerns and ongoing Iran hostage crisis that began on November 4, 1979. Reagan's campaign worried that Carter would be able to secure the release of the American hostages in Iran as part of the October surprise, Carter "suggested that Reagan would wreck Social Security" and portrayed him as a warmonger, and Anderson carried support from liberal Republicans dissatisfied with Reagan's conservatism. (Note: John B. Anderson questioned how realistic Reagan's budget proposals were, saying: "The only way Reagan is going to cut taxes, increase defense spending, and balance the budget at the same time is to use blue smoke and mirrors.") One of Reagan's key strengths was his appeal to the rising conservative movement. Though most conservative leaders espoused cutting taxes and budget deficits, many conservatives focused more closely on social issues like abortion and gay rights. Evangelical Protestants became an increasingly important voting bloc, and they generally supported Reagan. Reagan also won the backing of Reagan Democrats. Though he advocated socially conservative viewpoints, Reagan focused much of his campaign on attacks against Carter's foreign policy.

In August, Reagan gave a speech at the Neshoba County Fair, stating his belief in states' rights. Historians like Joseph Crespino argue that the visit was designed to incite racial animus in white Southern voters, and some also saw these actions as an extension of the Southern strategy to garner white support for Republican candidates. Allies and supporters of Reagan have said that this was his typical anti-big government rhetoric, without racial context or intent. In the October 28 debate, Carter chided Reagan for being against national health insurance. Reagan replied, "There you go again", though the audience laughed and viewers found him more appealing. Reagan later asked the audience if they were better off than they were four years ago, slightly paraphrasing Roosevelt's words in 1934. In 1983, Reagan's campaign managers were revealed to having obtained Carter's debate briefing book before the debates. On November 4, 1980, Reagan won in a decisive victory in the Electoral College over Carter, carrying 44 states and receiving 489 electoral votes to Carter's 49 in six states and the District of Columbia. He won the popular vote by a narrower margin, receiving nearly 51 percent to Carter's 41 percent and Anderson's 7 percent. Republicans won a majority of seats in the Senate for the first time since 1952 while Democrats retained the House of Representatives.

== Presidency (1981–1989) ==
=== First inauguration ===
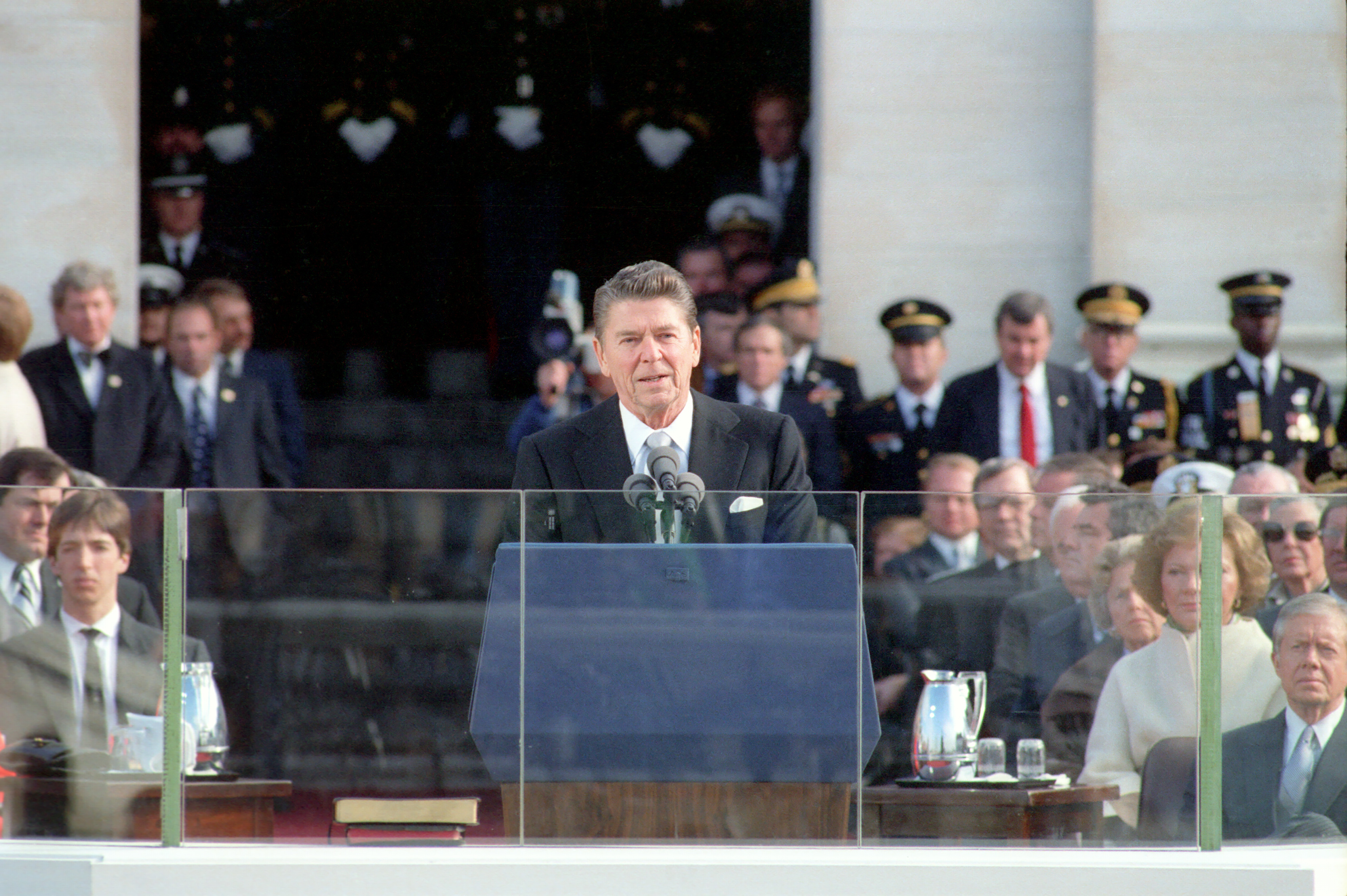
Reagan delivers his inaugural address from the US Capitol (audio only).

Reagan was inaugurated as the 40th president of the United States on January 20, 1981. Chief Justice Warren E. Burger administered the presidential oath of office. In his inaugural address, Reagan commented on the country's economic malaise, arguing, "In this present crisis, government is not the solution to our problem, government is the problem". As a final insult to President Carter, Iran waited until Reagan had been sworn in before announcing the release of their American hostages.

=== "Reaganomics" and the economy ===
Reagan advocated a laissez-faire philosophy, and promoted a set of neoliberal reforms dubbed "Reaganomics", which included monetarism and supply-side economics.

==== Taxation ====
Reagan outlining his plan for tax cuts, 1981

Reagan worked with the boll weevil Democrats to pass tax and budget legislation in a Congress led by Tip O'Neill, a liberal who strongly criticized Reaganomics. (Note: Despite their various disagreements, Reagan and O'Neill developed a friendship across party lines. O'Neill told Reagan that Republican opponents were friends "after six o'clock". Reagan would sometimes call O'Neill at any time and ask if it was after six o'clock to which O'Neill would invariably respond, "Absolutely, Mr. President".) He lifted federal oil and gasoline price controls on January 28, 1981, and in August, he signed the Economic Recovery Tax Act of 1981 to dramatically lower federal income tax rates and require exemptions and brackets to be indexed for inflation starting in 1985. Amid growing concerns about the mounting federal debt, Reagan signed the Tax Equity and Fiscal Responsibility Act of 1982, one of the eleven times Reagan raised taxes. The bill doubled the federal cigarette tax, rescinded a portion of the corporate tax cuts from the 1981 tax bill, and according to Paul Krugman, "a third of the 1981 cut" overall. Many of his supporters condemned the bill, but Reagan defended his preservation of cuts on individual income tax rates. By 1983, the amount of federal tax had fallen for all or most taxpayers, with taxes for higher-income people decreasing the most.

The Tax Reform Act of 1986 reduced the number of tax brackets and top tax rate, and almost doubled personal exemptions.

Reagan believed the tax cuts would not have increased the deficit as long as there was enough economic growth and spending cuts. His policies proposed that economic growth would occur when the tax cuts spurred investments. This theoretical relationship has been illustrated by some with the controversial Laffer curve. Critics labeled this "trickle-down economics", the belief that tax policies that benefit the wealthy will spread to the poor. Milton Friedman and Robert Mundell argued that these policies invigorated America's economy and contributed to the economic boom of the 1990s.

==== Inflation and unemployment ====
Monthly unemployment, inflation, and interest rates from January 1981 to January 1989 according to the Bureau of Labor Statistics and Federal Reserve Economic Data

Reagan took office in the midst of stagflation. The economy briefly experienced growth before plunging into a recession in July 1981. As Federal Reserve chairman, Paul Volcker fought inflation by pursuing a tight money policy of high interest rates, which restricted lending and investment, raised unemployment, and temporarily reduced economic growth. In December 1982, the Bureau of Labor Statistics (BLS) measured the unemployment rate at 10.8 percent. Around the same time, economic activity began to rise until its end in 1990, setting the record for the (then) longest peacetime expansion. In 1983, the recession ended and Reagan nominated Volcker to a second term in fear of damaging confidence in the economic recovery.

Reagan appointed Alan Greenspan to succeed Volcker in 1987. Greenspan raised interest rates in another attempt to curb inflation, setting off the Black Monday stock market crash, although the markets eventually recovered. By 1989, the BLS measured unemployment at 5.3 percent. The inflation rate dropped from 12 percent during the 1980 election to under 5 percent in 1989. Likewise, the interest rate dropped from 15 percent to under 10 percent. Yet, not all shared equally in the economic recovery, and both economic inequality and the number of homeless individuals increased during the 1980s. Critics have contended that a majority of the jobs created during this decade paid the minimum wage.

==== Government spending ====
In 1981, in an effort to keep it solvent, Reagan approved a plan for cuts to Social Security. He later backed off due to public backlash. He then created the Greenspan Commission to keep Social Security financially secure, and in 1983 he signed amendments to raise both the program's payroll taxes and retirement age for benefits. He had signed the Omnibus Budget Reconciliation Act of 1981 to cut funding for federal assistance such as food stamps, unemployment benefits, subsidized housing and the Aid to Families with Dependent Children, and would discontinue the Comprehensive Employment and Training Act. On the other side, defense spending doubled between 1981 and 1985. During Reagan's presidency, Project Socrates operated within the Defense Intelligence Agency to discover why the United States was unable to maintain its economic competitiveness. According to program director Michael Sekora, their findings helped the country surpass the Soviets in terms of missile defense technology.

==== Deregulation ====
Reagan sought to loosen federal regulation of economic activities, and he appointed key officials who shared this agenda. William Leuchtenburg writes that by 1986, the Reagan administration eliminated almost half of the federal regulations that had existed in 1981. The 1982 Garn–St. Germain Depository Institutions Act deregulated savings and loan associations by letting them make a variety of loans and investments outside of real estate. After the bill's passage, savings and loans associations engaged in riskier activities, and the leaders of some institutions embezzled funds. The administration's inattentiveness toward the industry contributed to the savings and loan crisis and costly bailouts.

==== Deficits ====
The deficits were exacerbated by the early 1980s recession, which cut into federal revenue. The national debt tripled between the fiscal years of 1980 and 1989, and the national debt as a percentage of the gross domestic product rose from 33 percent in 1981 to 53 percent by 1989. During his time in office, Reagan never fulfilled his 1980 campaign promise of submitting a balanced budget. The United States borrowed heavily to cover newly spawned federal budget deficits. Reagan described the tripled debt the "greatest disappointment of his presidency". Jeffrey Frankel opined that the deficits were a major reason why Reagan's successor, Bush, reneged on his campaign promise by raising taxes through the Budget Enforcement Act of 1990.

=== Assassination attempt ===
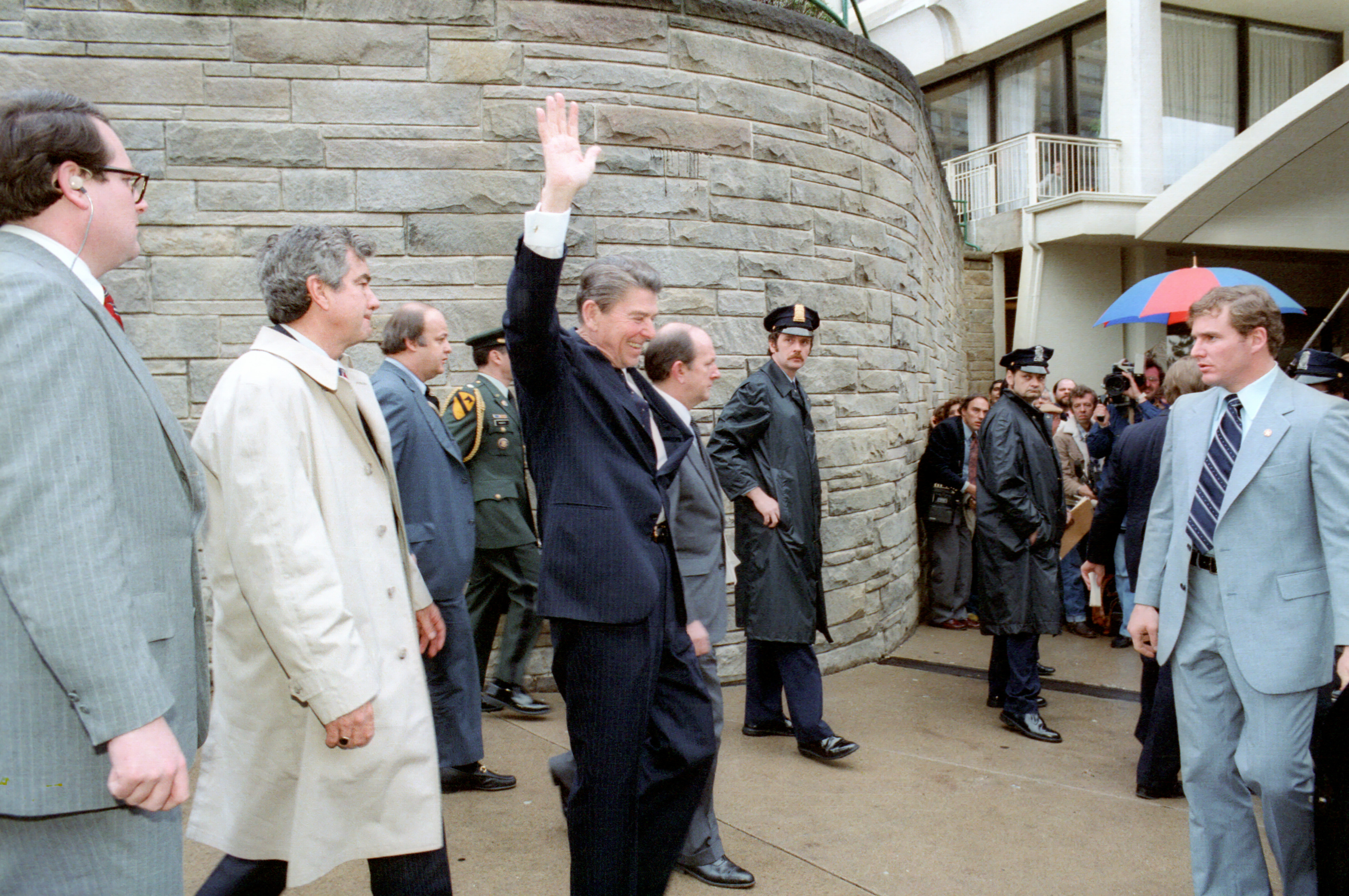
Reagan (center) waves just before he is shot on March 30, 1981.

On March 30, 1981, Reagan was shot by John Hinckley Jr. outside the Washington Hilton. Although "right on the margin of death" upon arrival at George Washington University Hospital, Reagan underwent surgery and recovered quickly from a broken rib, punctured lung, and internal bleeding. Later, Reagan came to believe that God had spared his life "for a chosen mission".

=== Supreme Court appointments ===
Reagan appointed three Associate Justices to the Supreme Court of the United States: Sandra Day O'Connor in 1981, which fulfilled a campaign promise to name the first female justice to the Court, Antonin Scalia in 1986, and Anthony Kennedy in 1988. He also elevated William Rehnquist from Associate Justice to Chief Justice in 1986. The direction of the Supreme Court's reshaping has been described as conservative.

=== Public sector labor union fights ===
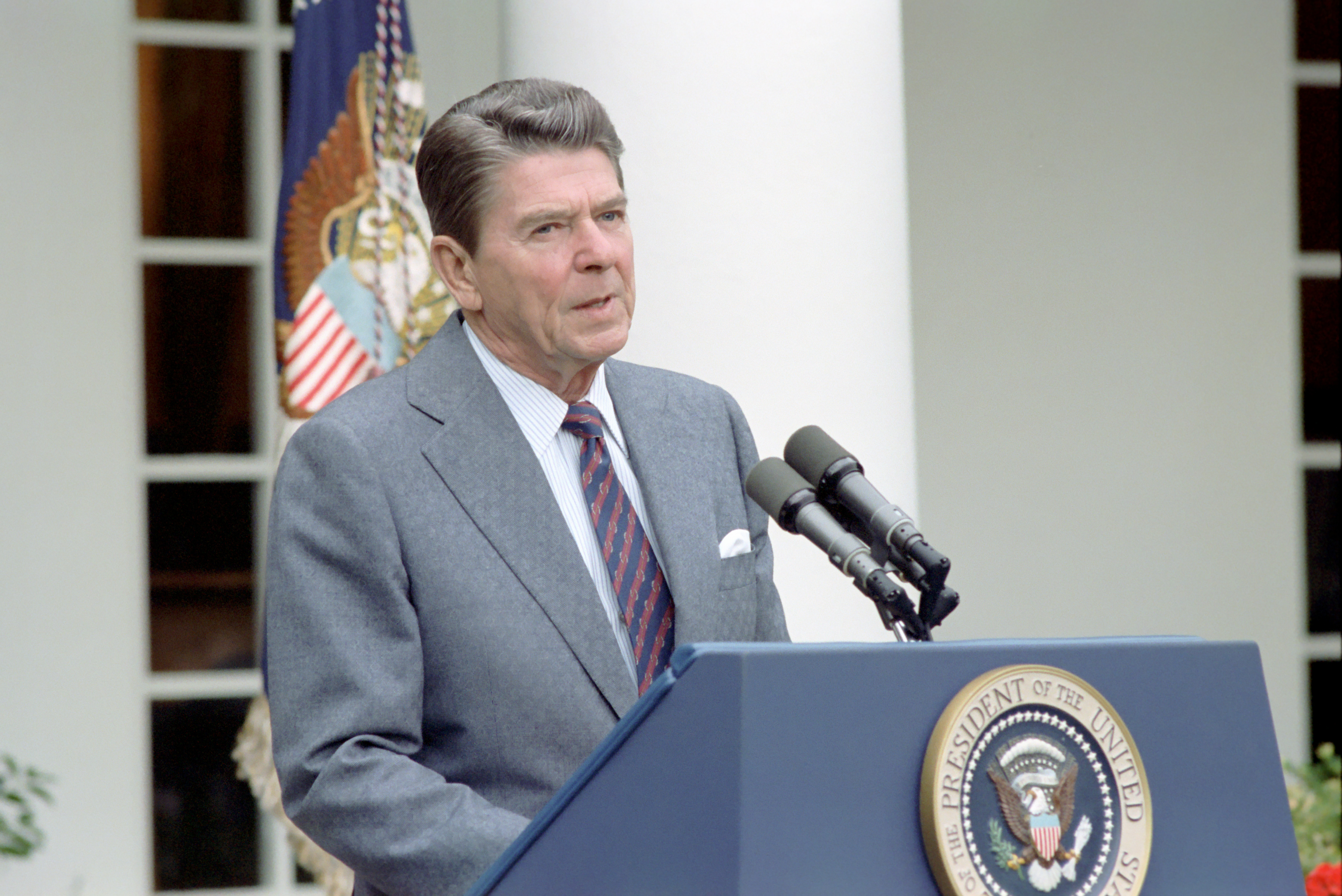
Reagan making a statement to the press regarding the air traffic controllers strike, 1981

Early in August 1981, the Professional Air Traffic Controllers Organization (PATCO) went on strike, violating a federal law prohibiting government unions from striking. On August 3, Reagan said that he would fire air traffic controllers if they did not return to work within 48 hours; according to him, 38 percent did not return. On August 13, Reagan fired roughly 12,000 striking air traffic controllers who ignored his order. He used military controllers and supervisors to handle the nation's commercial air traffic until new controllers could be hired and trained. The breaking of the PATCO strike demoralized organized labor, and the number of strikes fell greatly in the 1980s. With the assent of Reagan's sympathetic National Labor Relations Board appointees, many companies also won wage and benefit cutbacks from unions, especially in the manufacturing sector. During Reagan's presidency, the share of employees who were part of a labor union dropped from approximately one-fourth of the total workforce to approximately one-sixth of the total workforce.

=== Civil rights ===
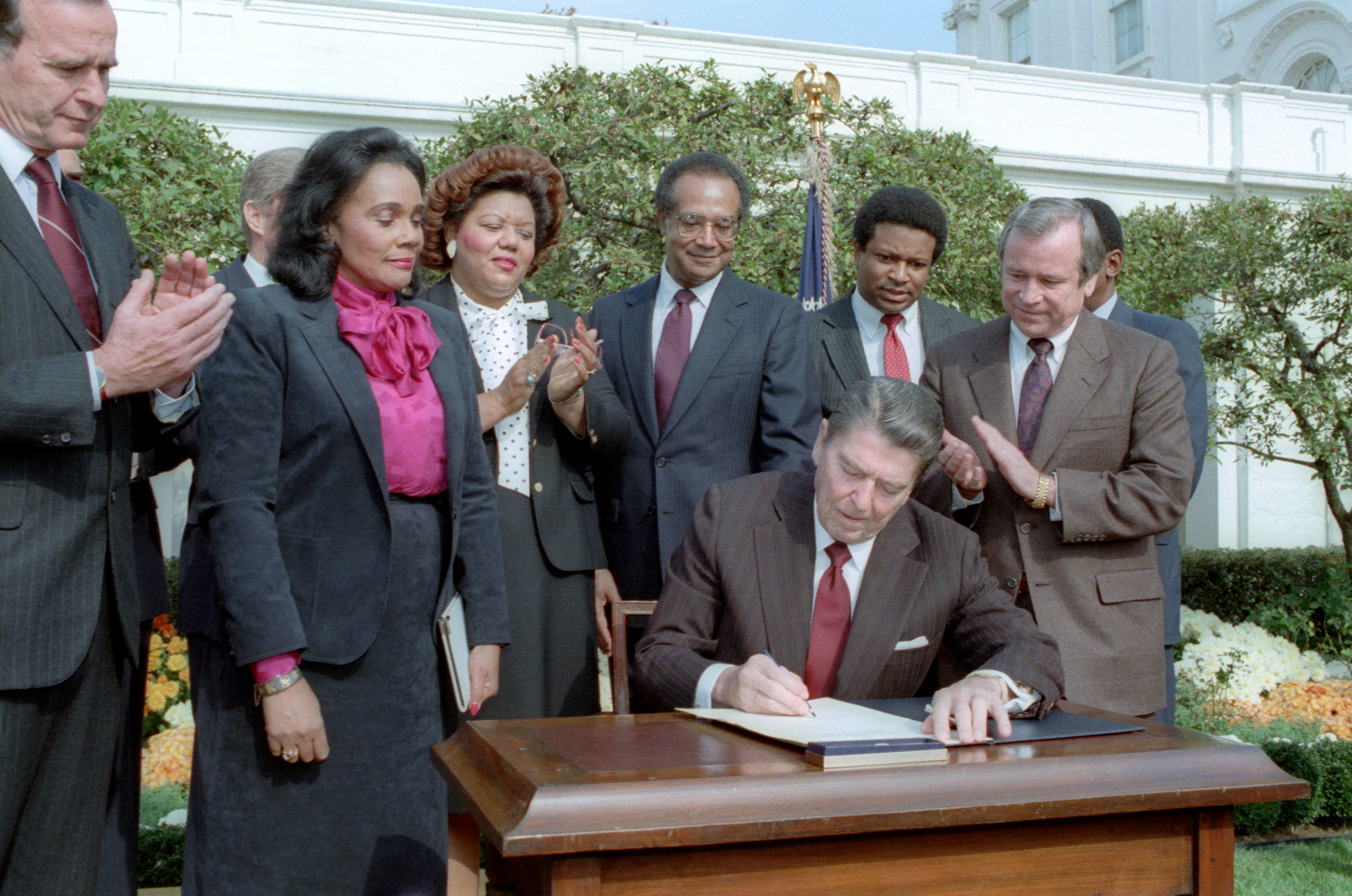
Reagan signing the Passage of Martin Luther King Jr. Day, 1983

Despite Reagan having opposed the Voting Rights Act of 1965, which he long-deemed "humiliating to the South", the bill was extended for 25 years in 1982. He initially opposed the establishment of Martin Luther King Jr. Day, believing that the momentum for establishing the holiday was "based on an image, not reality," but signed a bill to create the holiday in 1983 after it passed both houses of Congress with veto-proof margins. In 1984, he signed legislation intended to impose fines for fair housing discrimination offenses. In March 1988, Reagan vetoed the Civil Rights Restoration Act of 1987, but Congress overrode his veto. He had argued that the bill unreasonably increased the federal government's power and undermined the rights of churches and business owners. In doing so, Reagan was the first US president to veto civil rights legislation since Andrew Johnson vetoed the Civil Rights Act of 1866, which was also overridden by Congress. Later in September, legislation was passed to correct loopholes in the Fair Housing Act of 1968.

Early in his presidency, Reagan appointed Clarence M. Pendleton Jr., known for his opposition to affirmative action and equal pay for men and women, as chair of the United States Commission on Civil Rights. Pendleton and Reagan's subsequent appointees greatly eroded the enforcement of civil rights law, arousing the ire of civil rights advocates. In 1987, Reagan unsuccessfully nominated Robert Bork to the Supreme Court as a way to achieve his civil rights policy that could not be fulfilled during his presidency; his administration had opposed affirmative action, particularly in education, federal assistance programs, housing and employment, but Reagan reluctantly continued these policies. In housing, Reagan's administration saw considerably fewer fair housing cases filed than the three previous administrations.

=== War on drugs ===
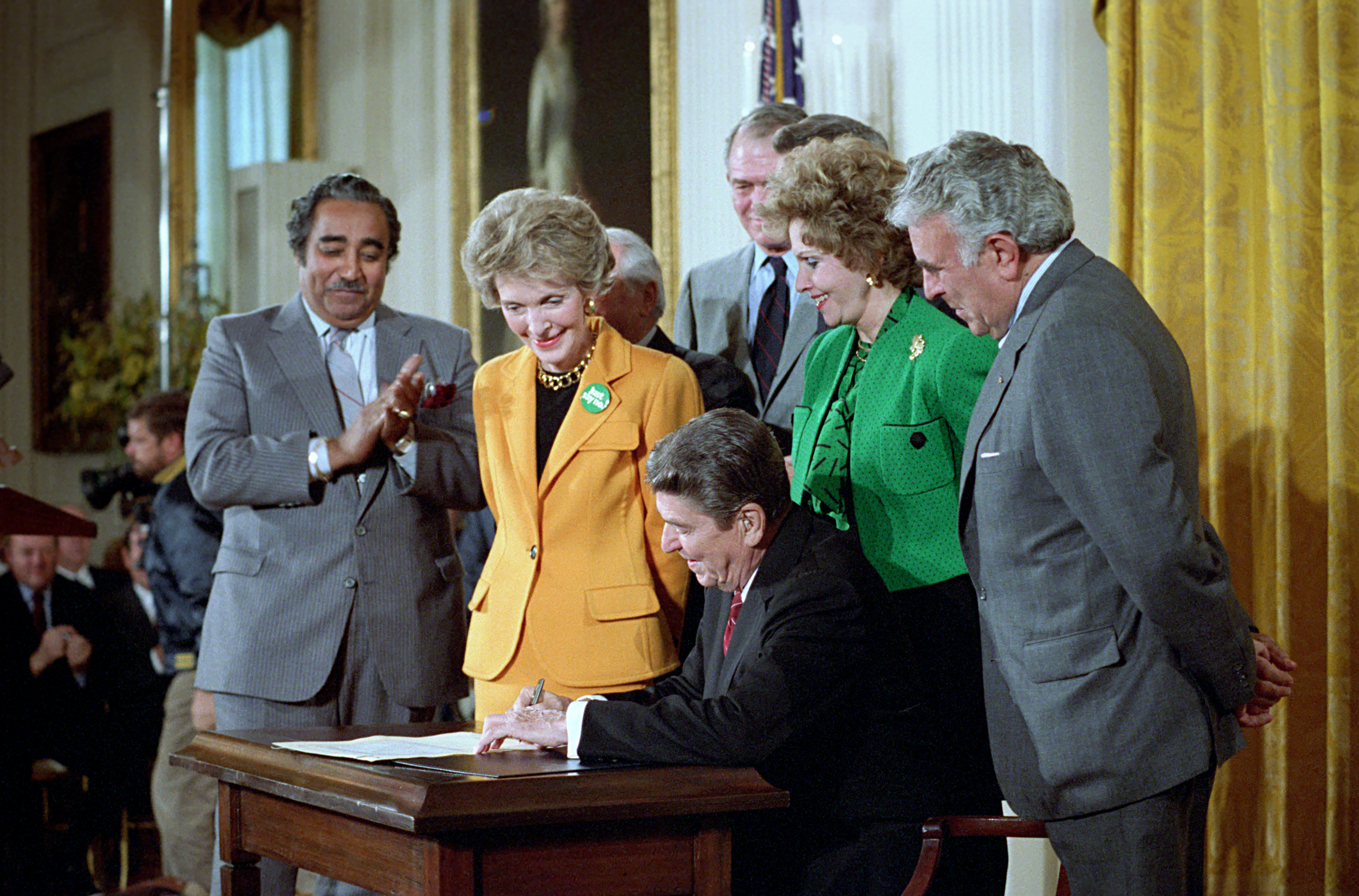
Reagan signing the Anti-Drug Abuse Act of 1986

In response to concerns about the increasing crack epidemic, Reagan intensified the war on drugs in 1982. While the American public did not see drugs as an important issue then, the FBI, Drug Enforcement Administration and the United States Department of Defense all increased their anti-drug funding immensely. Reagan's administration publicized the campaign to gain support after crack became widespread in 1985. Reagan signed the Anti-Drug Abuse Act of 1986 and 1988 to specify penalties for drug offenses. Both bills have been criticized in the years since for promoting racial disparities. Nancy Reagan founded the "Just Say No" campaign to discourage others from engaging in recreational drug use and raise awareness about the dangers of drugs. A 1988 study showed 39 percent of high school seniors using illegal drugs compared to 53 percent in 1980, but Scott Lilienfeld and Hal Arkowitz say that the success of these types of campaigns has not been affirmatively proven.

=== Escalation of the Cold War ===
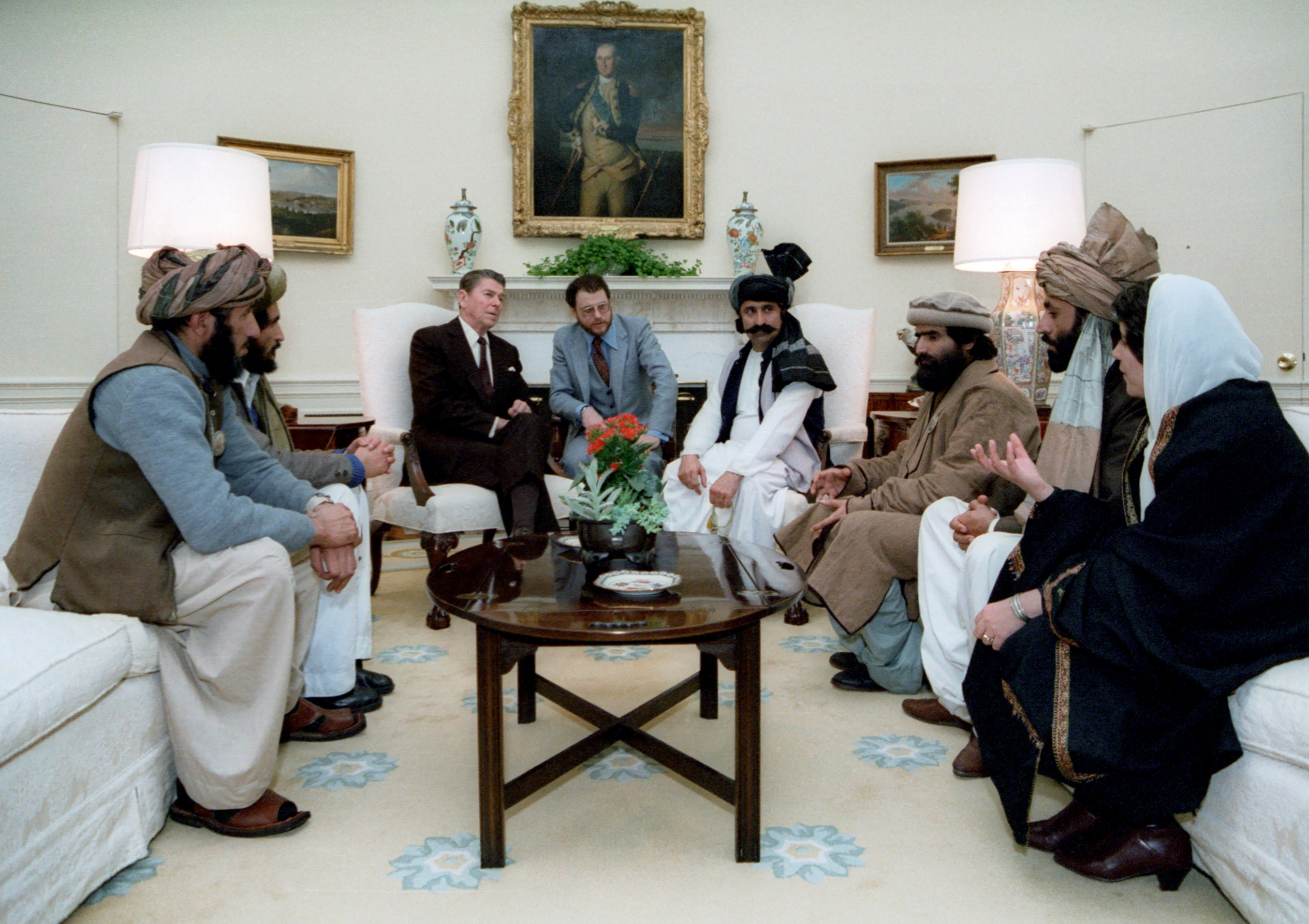
Reagan meeting with Afghan mujahideen leaders, 1983

Reagan ordered a massive defense buildup; he revived the B-1 Lancer program that had been rejected by the Carter administration, and deployed the MX missile. In response to the Soviet deployment of the SS-20 ballistic missile, he oversaw NATO's deployment of Pershing II ballistic missiles and GLCM cruise missiles in Western Europe, which had been approved by Carter as part of the NATO Double-Track Decision. In 1982, Reagan tried to cut off the Soviet Union's access to hard currency by impeding its proposed gas line to Western Europe. This hurt the Soviet economy, but also caused ill will among American allies in Europe who counted on the resulting revenue; he later retreated on this issue. In March 1983, Reagan introduced the Strategic Defense Initiative (SDI) to protect the United States from space intercontinental ballistic missiles. He believed that this defense shield could protect the country from nuclear destruction in a hypothetical nuclear war with the Soviet Union. There was much disbelief among the scientific community surrounding the program's scientific feasibility, leading opponents to dub the SDI "Star Wars", although Soviet leader Yuri Andropov said it would lead to "an extremely dangerous path".

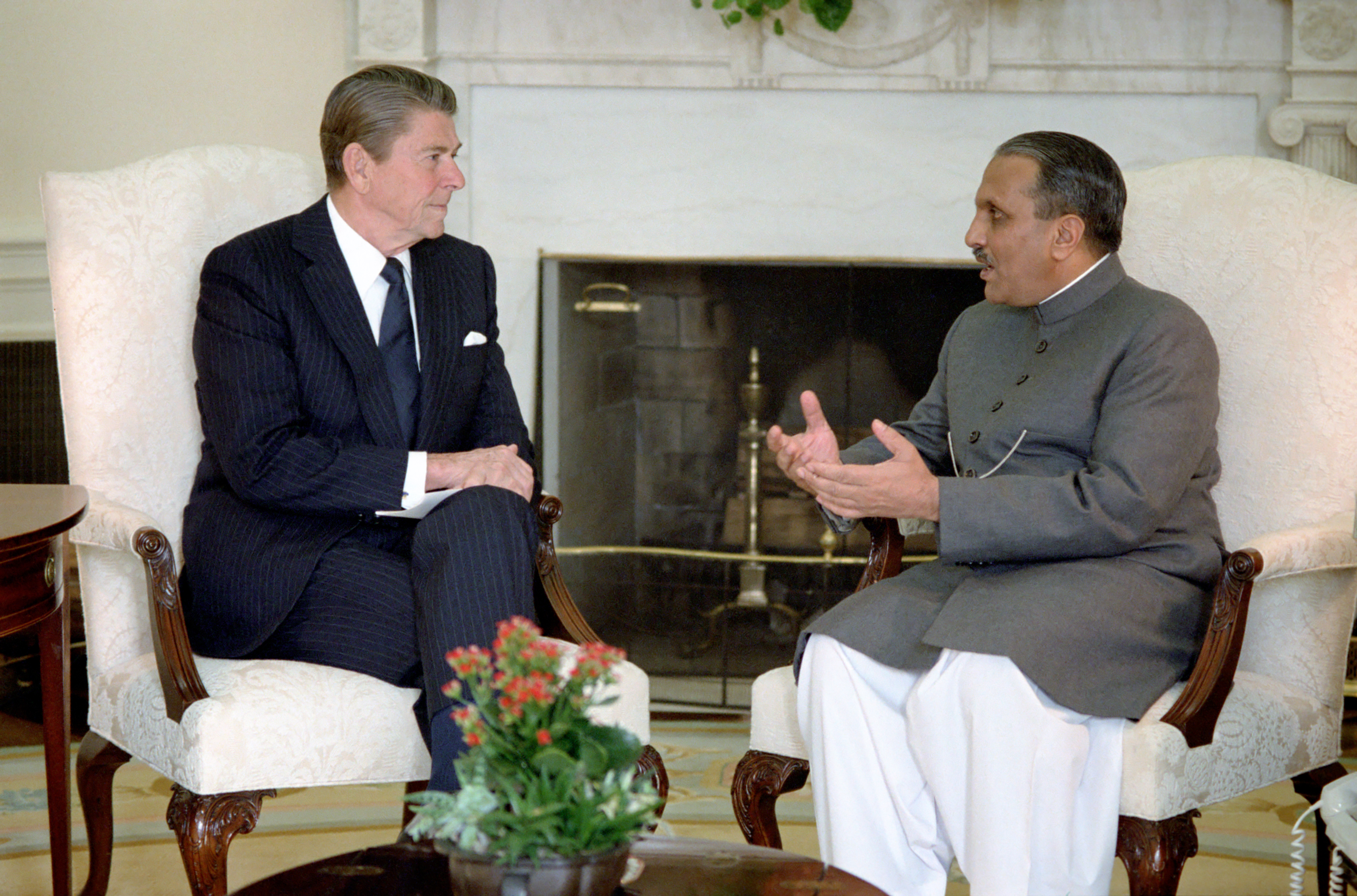
Reagan listening to Pakistani president Muhammad Zia-ul-Haq, 1982

In a 1982 address to the British Parliament, Reagan said, "the march of freedom and democracy... will leave Marxism–Leninism on the ash heap of history". Dismissed by the American press as "wishful thinking", Margaret Thatcher called the address a "triumph". David Cannadine says of Thatcher that "Reagan had been grateful for her interest in him at a time when the British establishment refused to take him seriously", with the two agreeing on "building up stronger defenses against Soviet Russia" and both believing in outfacing "what Reagan would later call 'the evil empire'", in reference to the Soviet Union, during a speech to the National Association of Evangelicals in March 1983. After Soviet fighters downed Korean Air Lines Flight 007 in September, which included Congressman Larry McDonald and 61 other Americans, Reagan expressed outrage towards the Soviet Union. The next day, reports suggested that the Soviets had fired on the plane by mistake. In spite of the harsh, discordant rhetoric, Reagan's administration continued discussions with the Soviet Union on START I.

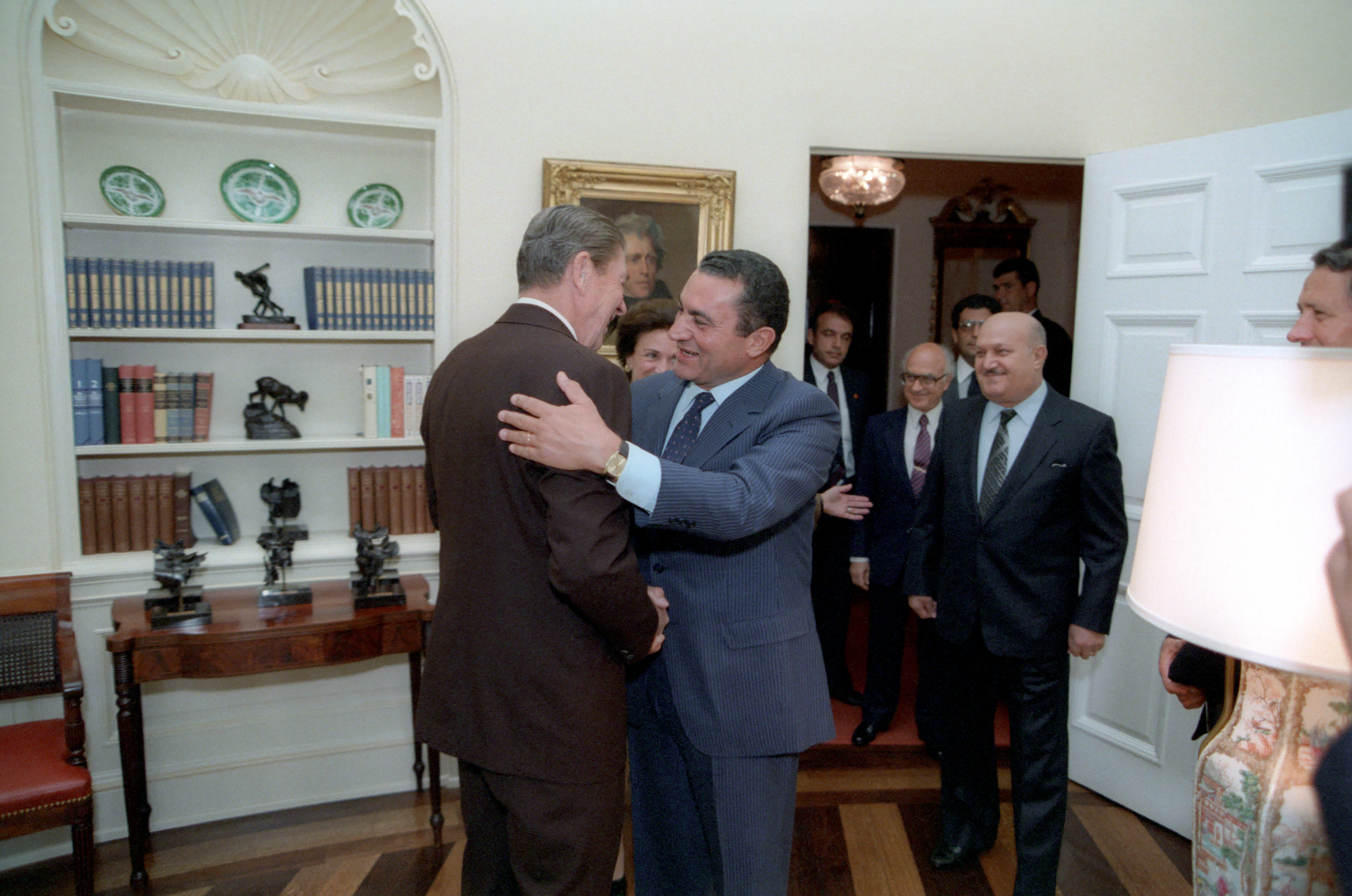
Reagan meeting Egyptian President Hosni Mubarak in the Oval Office, September 1983

Although the Reagan administration agreed with the communist government in China to reduce the sale of arms to Taiwan in 1982, Reagan was the first US president to explicitly reject containment and détente, instead advancing the idea that the Soviet Union could be defeated rather than managed through negotiation. His covert aid to Afghan mujahideen forces through Pakistan against the Soviets has been given credit for assisting in ending the Soviet occupation of Afghanistan. However, the United States was subjected to blowback in the form of the Taliban that opposed them in the war in Afghanistan. In his 1985 State of the Union Address, Reagan proclaimed, "Support for freedom fighters is self-defense." Through the Reagan Doctrine, his administration supported anti-communist movements that fought against groups backed by the Soviet Union in an effort to rollback Soviet-backed communist governments and reduce Soviet influence across the world. The Reagan administration ignored human rights violations in the countries they backed and held a narrow definition of human rights. Other human rights concerns include the genocide in Guatemala, as well as mass killings in Chad.

=== Invasion of Grenada ===
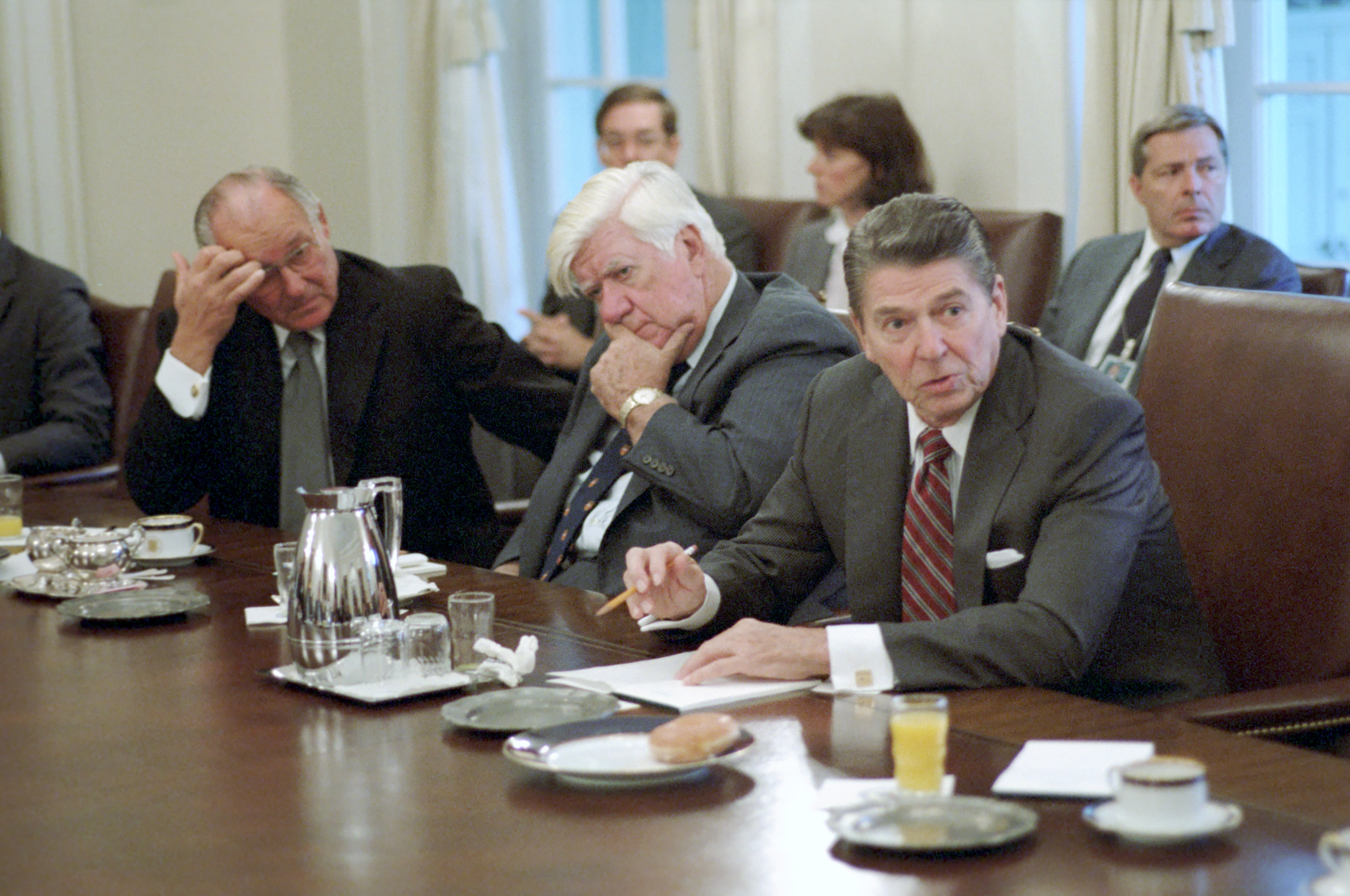
Reagan discussing the Grenada situation with a bipartisan group of members of Congress, 1983

On October 19, 1983, Maurice Bishop, the Prime Minister of Grenada, was overthrown and murdered in a coup orchestrated by his Deputy Prime Minister, Bernard Coard. Several days later, Reagan ordered American forces to invade Grenada. Reagan cited a regional threat posed by a Soviet-Cuban military build-up and concern for the safety of hundreds of American medical students at St. George's University. Two days of fighting commenced, resulting in an American victory. While the invasion enjoyed public support in the United States, it was criticized internationally, with the United Nations General Assembly voting to censure the American government. Cannon later noted that throughout Reagan's 1984 presidential campaign, the invasion overshadowed the 1983 Beirut barracks bombings, which killed 241 Americans taking part in an international peacekeeping operation during the Lebanese Civil War.

=== 1984 election ===
1984 electoral vote results. Reagan won 525–13.

Reagan announced his reelection campaign on January 29, 1984, declaring, "America is back and standing tall". In February, his administration reversed the unpopular decision to send the United States Marine Corps to Lebanon, thus eliminating a political liability for him. Reagan faced minimal opposition in the Republican primaries, and he and Bush accepted the nomination at the Dallas convention in August. In the general election, his campaign ran the commercial, "Morning in America". At a time when the American economy was already recovering, former vice president Walter Mondale was attacked by Reagan's campaign as a "tax-and-spend Democrat", while Mondale criticized the deficit, the SDI, and Reagan's civil rights policy. However, Reagan's age induced his campaign managers to minimize his public appearances. Mondale's campaign believed that Reagan's age and mental health were issues before the October presidential debates.

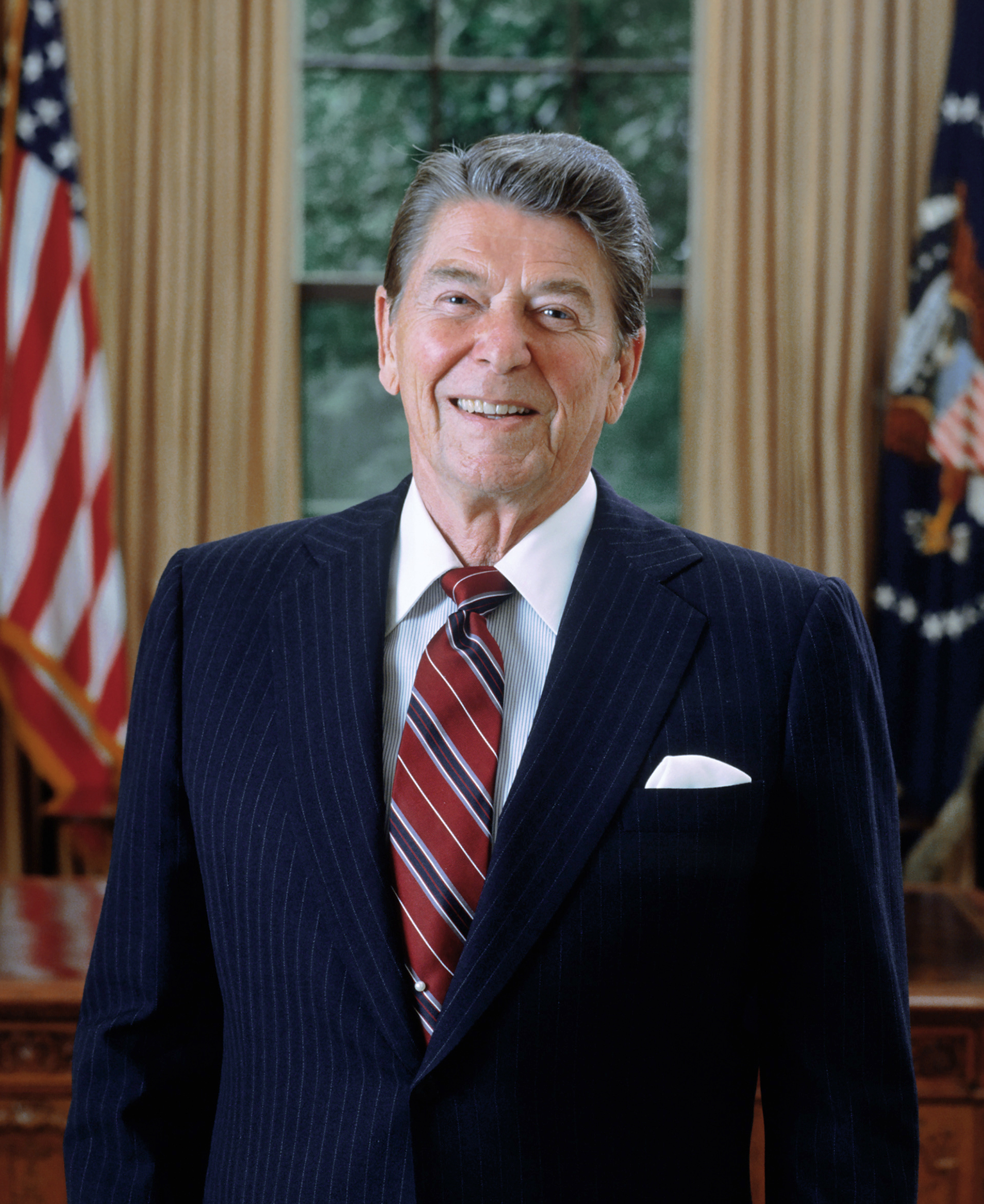
Official portrait, 1985

Following Reagan's performance in the first debate where he struggled to recall statistics, his age was brought up by the media in negative fashion. Reagan's campaign changed his tactics for the second debate where he quipped, "I will not make age an issue of this campaign. I am not going to exploit, for political purposes, my opponent's youth and inexperience". This remark generated applause and laughter, even from Mondale. At that point, Broder suggested that age was no longer a liability for Reagan, and Mondale's campaign felt that "the election was over". In November, Reagan won a landslide reelection victory with 59 percent of the popular vote and 525 electoral votes from 49 states. Mondale won 41 percent of the popular vote and 13 electoral votes from the District of Columbia and his home state of Minnesota.

=== Response to the AIDS epidemic ===
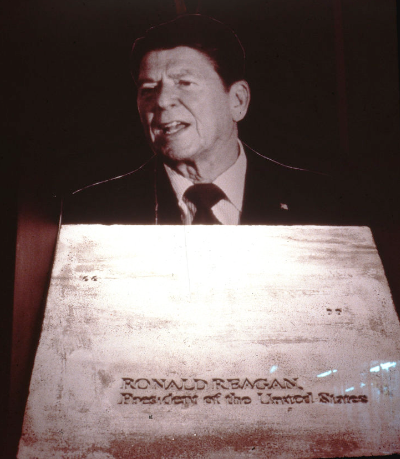
Reagan has been criticized for his delayed and muted response to the AIDS epidemic. This 1987 art installation by ACT UP quotes Reagan on AIDS with a blank slate, representing total silence.

The AIDS epidemic began to unfold in 1981, and AIDS was initially difficult to understand for physicians and the public. As the epidemic advanced, according to White House physician and later physician to the president, brigadier general John Hutton, Reagan thought of AIDS as though "it was the measles and would go away". The October 1985 death of the President's friend and Hollywood celebrity Rock Hudson affected Reagan's view; Reagan approached Hutton for more information on the disease. Still, between September 18, 1985, and February 4, 1986, Reagan did not mention AIDS in public.

In 1986, Reagan asked C. Everett Koop to develop a report on AIDS. Koop angered many evangelical conservatives, both in and out of the Reagan administration, by stressing the importance of sex education including condom usage in schools. A year later, Reagan, who reportedly had not read the report, gave his first speech on the epidemic when 36,058 Americans had been diagnosed with AIDS, and 20,849 had died of it. Reagan called for increased testing (including routine testing for marriage applicants) and mandatory testing of select groups (including federal prisoners). Even after this speech, however, Reagan remained reluctant to publicly address AIDS.

Scholars and AIDS activists have argued that the Reagan administration largely ignored the AIDS crisis. Randy Shilts and Michael Bronski said that AIDS research was chronically underfunded during Reagan's administration, and Bronski added that requests for more funding by doctors at the Centers for Disease Control and Prevention were routinely denied. In a September 1985 press conference (shortly before Hudson publicly announced his AIDS diagnosis) Reagan called a government AIDS research program a "top priority", but also cited budgetary constraints. Between the fiscal years of 1984 and 1989, federal spending on AIDS totaled $5.6 billion. The Reagan administration had proposed $2.8 billion during this time period, but pressure from congressional Democrats resulted in the larger amount.

=== Addressing apartheid ===
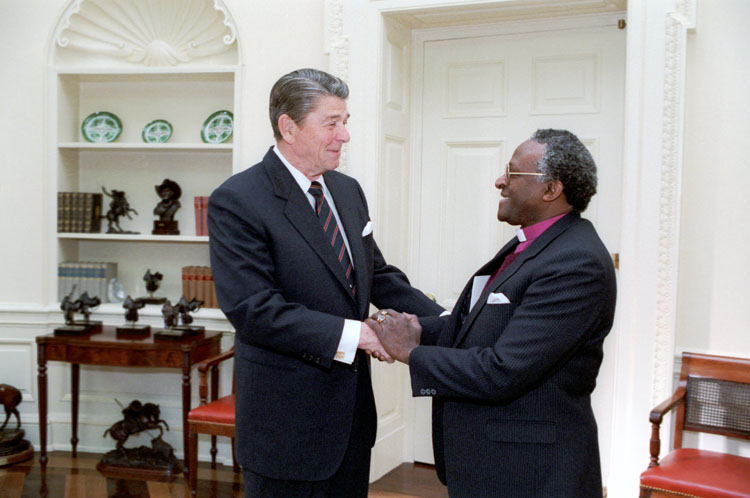
Reagan meeting with Bishop Desmond Tutu in the Oval Office, December 1984

Popular opposition to apartheid increased during Reagan's first term in office and the disinvestment from South Africa movement achieved critical mass after decades of growing momentum. Criticism of apartheid was particularly strong on college campuses and among mainline Protestant denominations. President Reagan was opposed to divestiture because he personally thought, as he wrote in a letter to Sammy Davis Jr., it "would hurt the very people we are trying to help and would leave us no contact within South Africa to try and bring influence to bear on the government". He also noted the fact that the "American-owned industries there employ more than 80,000 blacks" and that their employment practices were "very different from the normal South African customs".

The Reagan administration developed constructive engagement with the South African government as a means of encouraging it to gradually move away from apartheid and to give up its nuclear weapons program. It was part of a larger initiative designed to foster peaceful economic development and political change throughout southern Africa. This policy, however, engendered much public criticism, and renewed calls for the imposition of stringent sanctions. Desmond Tutu described Reagan administration as "an unmitigated disaster for us blacks", and Reagan himself as "a racist pure and simple".

In response, Reagan announced the imposition of new sanctions on the South African government, including an arms embargo in late 1985. These sanctions were seen as weak by anti-apartheid activists and as insufficient by the president's opponents in Congress. In 1986, Congress approved the Comprehensive Anti-Apartheid Act, which included tougher sanctions; Reagan's veto was overridden by Congress. Afterward, he remained opposed to apartheid and unsure of "how best to oppose it". Several European countries, as well as Japan, also imposed their sanctions on South Africa soon after.

=== Libya bombing ===
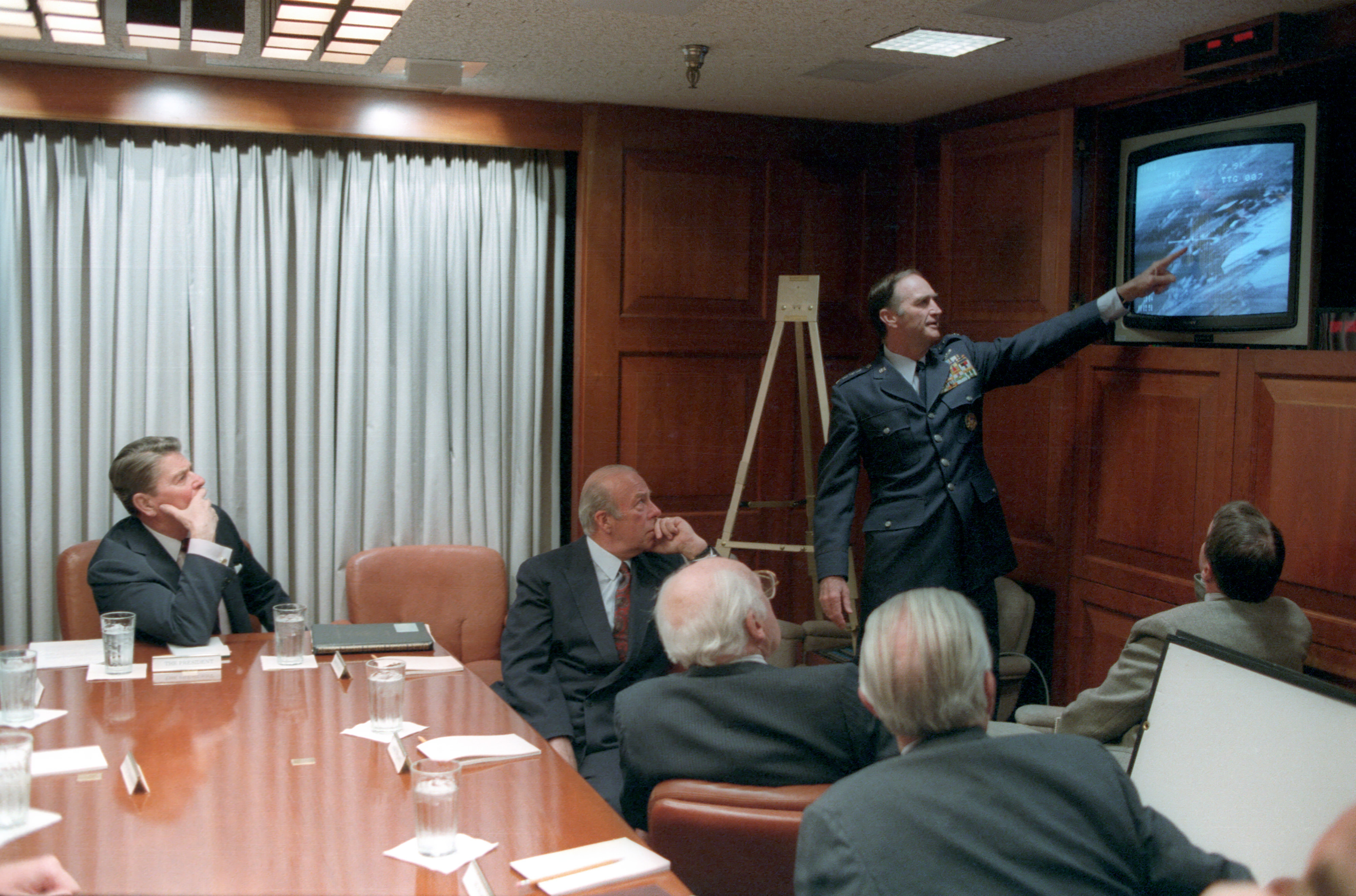
Reagan receiving a briefing on the Libya bombing, 1986

Contentious relations between Libya and the United States under President Reagan were revived in the West Berlin discotheque bombing that killed two American soldiers and injured dozens of others on April 5, 1986. Stating that there was irrefutable evidence that Libya had a direct role in the bombing, Reagan authorized the use of force against the country. On April 14, the United States launched a series of airstrikes on ground targets in Libya. Thatcher allowed the United States Air Force to use Britain's air bases to launch the attack, on the justification that the United Kingdom was supporting America's right to self-defense under Article 51 of the Charter of the United Nations. The attack was, according to Reagan, designed to halt Muammar Gaddafi's "ability to export terrorism", offering him "incentives and reasons to alter his criminal behavior". The attack was condemned by many countries; by an overwhelming vote, the United Nations General Assembly adopted a resolution to condemn the attack and deem it a violation of the Charter and international law.

=== Iran–Contra affair ===
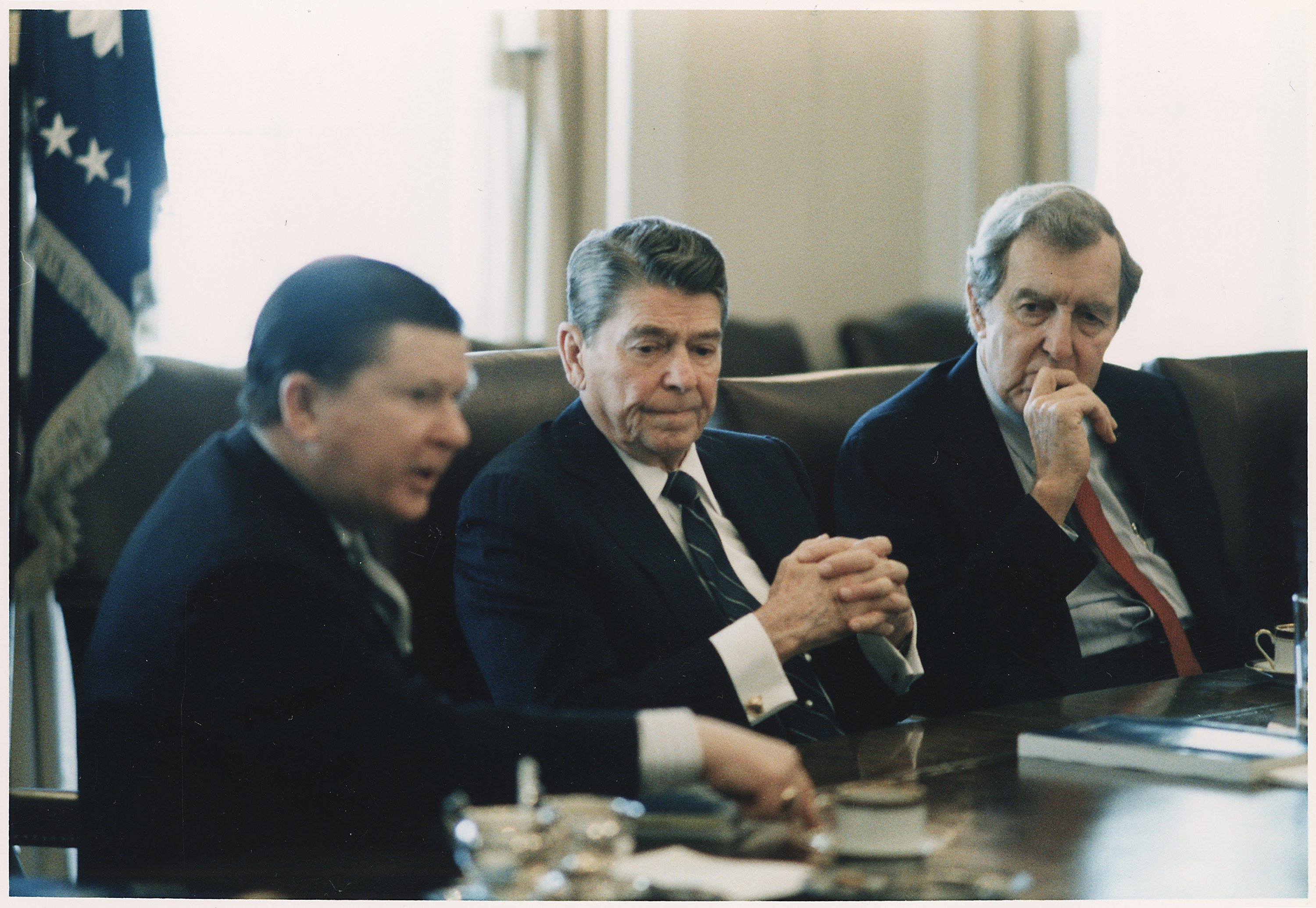
Reagan receiving the Tower Commission on the Iran–Contra affair, 1987

Reagan authorized William J. Casey to arm the Contras, fearing that Communists would take over Nicaragua if it remained under the leadership of the Sandinistas. Congress passed the 1982 Boland Amendment, prohibiting the CIA and Department of Defense from using their budgets to provide aid to the Contras. Still, the Reagan administration raised funds for the Contras from private donors and foreign governments. When Congress learned that the CIA had secretly placed naval mines in Nicaraguan harbors, Congress passed a second Boland Amendment that barred granting any assistance to the Contras. By mid-1985, Hezbollah began to take American hostages in Lebanon, holding seven of them in reaction to the United States' support of Israel.

Reagan procured the release of seven American hostages held by Hezbollah by selling American arms to Iran, then engaged in the Iran–Iraq War, in hopes that Iran would pressure Hezbollah to release the hostages. The Reagan administration sold over 2,000 missiles to Iran without informing Congress; Hezbollah released four hostages but captured an additional six Americans. On Oliver North's initiative, the administration redirected the proceeds from the missile sales to the Contras. The transactions were exposed by Ash-Shiraa in early November 1986. Reagan initially denied any wrongdoing, but on November 25, he announced that John Poindexter and North had left the administration and that he would form the Tower Commission to investigate the transactions. A few weeks later, Reagan asked a panel of federal judges to appoint a special prosecutor who would conduct a separate investigation.

The Tower Commission released a report in February 1987 confirming that the administration had traded arms for hostages and sent the proceeds of the weapons sales to the Contras. The report laid most of the blame on North, Poindexter, and Robert McFarlane, but it was also critical of Donald Regan and other White House staffers. Investigators did not find conclusive proof that Reagan had known about the aid provided to the Contras, but the report noted that Reagan had "created the conditions which made possible the crimes committed by others" and had "knowingly participated or acquiesced in covering up the scandal". The affair damaged the administration and raised questions about Reagan's competency and the wisdom of conservative policies. The administration's credibility was also badly damaged on the international stage as it had violated its own arms embargo on Iran.

=== USS Stark incident ===
In the context of the Tanker War on May 17, 1987, an Iraqi fighter jet hit the USS Stark with two Exocet missiles, killing 37 sailors. Three days later, Reagan declared a "policy of self-defense" would now be ordered, as he accepted Iraq's official apology:

Our ships are deployed in the Persian Gulf in order to protect U.S. interests and maintain free access and maintain freedom of navigation and access to the area's oil supplies. It is a vital mission, but our ships need to protect themselves and they will. [From now on] if aircraft approach any of our ships in a way that appears hostile, there is one order of battle. Defend yourselves. Defend American lives.. We're going to do what has to be done to keep the Persian Gulf open. It's international waters. No country there has a right to try and close it off and take it for itself. And the villain in the piece really is Iran. And so they're delighted with what has just happened.

=== Soviet decline and thaw in relations ===
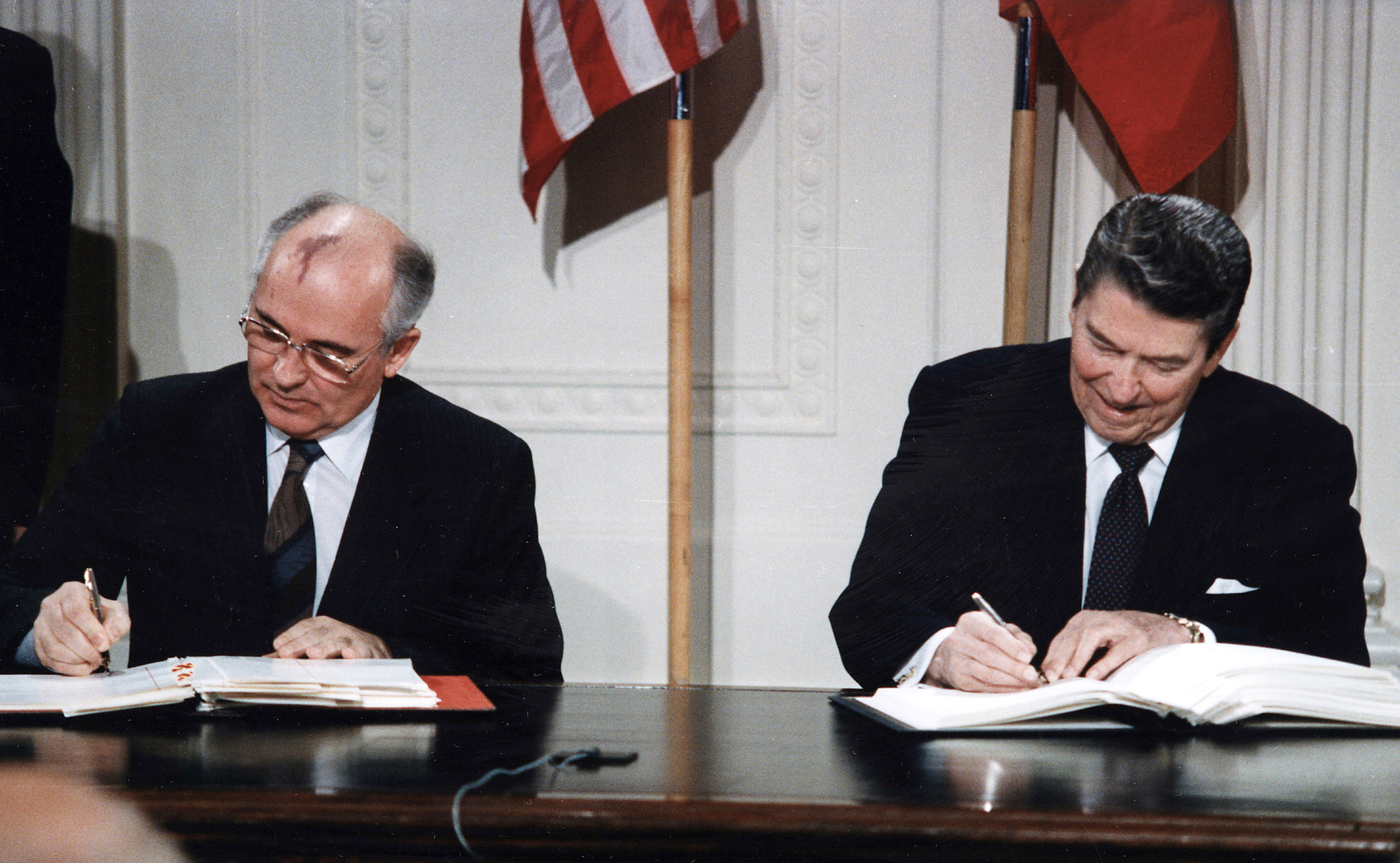
Mikhail Gorbachev and Reagan signing the INF Treaty, 1987

Although the Soviets did not accelerate military spending in response to Reagan's military buildup, their enormous military expenses, in combination with collectivized agriculture and inefficient planned manufacturing, were a heavy burden for the Soviet economy. At the same time, the prices of oil, the primary source of Soviet export revenues, fell to one third of the previous level in 1985. These factors contributed to a stagnant economy during the tenure of Mikhail Gorbachev as Soviet leader.

President Ronald Reagan giving a speech at Moscow State University in the USSR, 1988

Reagan's foreign policy towards the Soviets wavered between brinkmanship and cooperation. Reagan appreciated Gorbachev's revolutionary change in the direction of the Soviet policy and shifted to diplomacy, intending to encourage him to pursue substantial arms agreements. They held four summit conferences between 1985 and 1988. Reagan believed that if he could persuade the Soviets to allow for more democracy and free speech, this would lead to reform and the end of communism. The critical summit was in Reykjavík in 1986, where they agreed to abolish all nuclear weapons. However, Gorbachev added the condition that SDI research must be confined to laboratories during the ten-year period when disarmament would take place. Reagan refused, stating that it was defensive only and that he would share the secrets with the Soviets, thus failing to reach a deal.

In June 1987, Reagan addressed Gorbachev during a speech at the Berlin Wall, demanding that he "tear down this wall". The remark was ignored at the time, but after the wall fell in November 1989, it was retroactively recast as a soaring achievement. In December, Reagan and Gorbachev met again at the Washington Summit to sign the Intermediate-Range Nuclear Forces Treaty, committing to the total abolition of their respective short-range and medium-range missile stockpiles. The treaty established an inspections regime designed to ensure that both parties honored the agreement. In May 1988, the US Senate overwhelmingly voted in favor of ratifying the treaty, providing a major boost to Reagan's popularity in the aftermath of the Iran–Contra affair. A new era of trade and openness between the two powers commenced, and the United States and Soviet Union cooperated on international issues such as the Iran–Iraq War.

== Post-presidency (1989–2004) ==
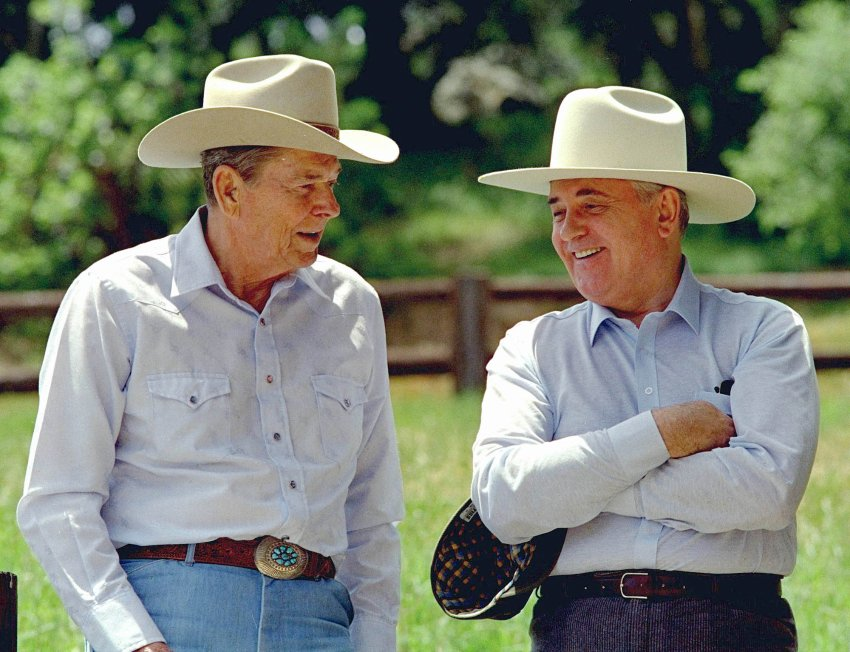
Reagan and Gorbachev at Rancho del Cielo, 1992

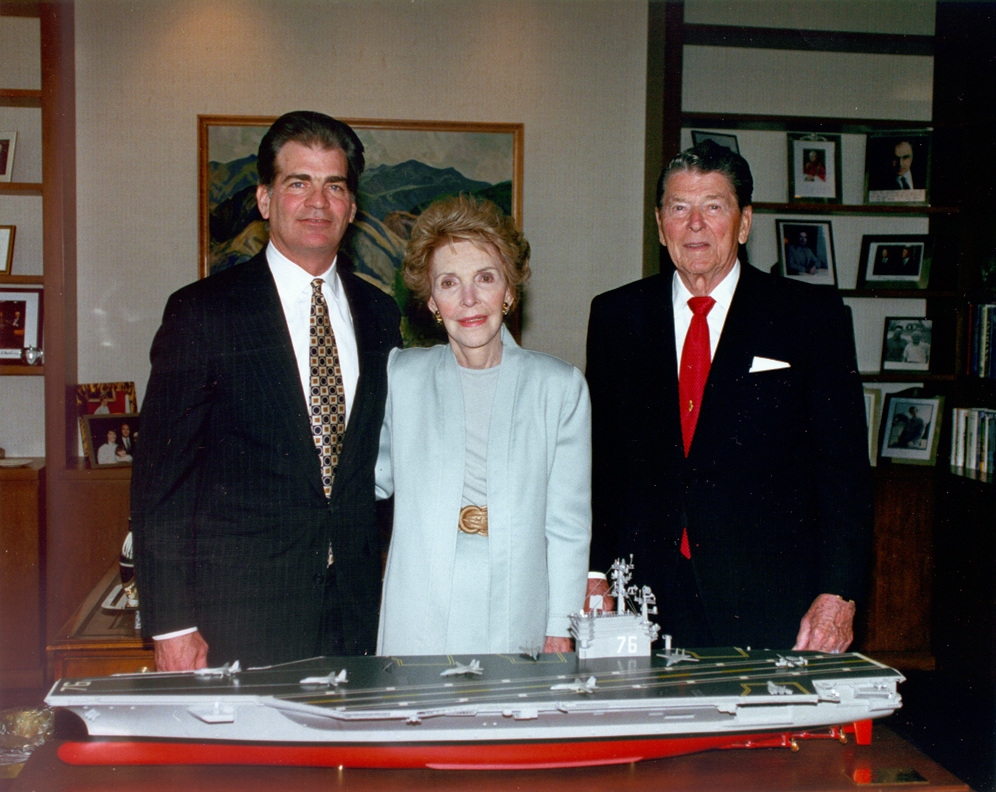
Nancy and Ronald Reagan with a model of USS Ronald Reagan, 1996

Upon leaving the presidency on January 20, 1989, at the age of 77, Reagan became the oldest president at the end of his tenure. This distinction eventually passed to president Joe Biden, who was 82 years old when he left office in 2025.

In retirement, Ronald and Nancy Reagan lived at 668 St. Cloud Road in Bel Air, in addition to Rancho del Cielo in Santa Barbara. He received multiple awards and honors in addition to generous payments for speaking engagements. In 1989 he supported repealing the Twenty-second Amendment's presidential term limits. In 1991, the Ronald Reagan Presidential Library opened. Reagan also addressed the 1992 Republican National Convention "to inspire allegiance to the party regulars", and favored a constitutional amendment requiring a balanced budget.

=== Support for Brady Bill ===
Reagan publicly favored the Brady Bill, drawing criticism from gun control opponents. In 1989, in his first public appearance after leaving office and shortly after the Stockton schoolyard shooting, he stated: "I do not believe in taking away the right of the citizen to own guns for sporting, for hunting, and so forth, or for home defense. But I do believe that an AK-47, a machine gun, is not a sporting weapon or needed for the defense of the home".

In March 1991, Reagan wrote an op-ed in the New York Times, titled "Why I'm for the Brady Bill". In May 1994, Reagan, Gerald Ford, and Jimmy Carter sent a letter to House members, urging them to support the controversial Federal Assault Weapons Ban.

=== Alzheimer's disease ===
Reagan's final public speech occurred on February 3, 1994, during a tribute to him in Washington, D.C.; his last major public appearance was at the funeral of Richard Nixon on April 27, 1994. In August 1994, Reagan was diagnosed with Alzheimer's disease, which he announced through a handwritten letter in November. There was speculation over how long he had demonstrated symptoms of mental degeneration, but lay observations that he suffered from Alzheimer's while still in office have been disputed by medical experts. His doctors said that he first began exhibiting overt symptoms of the illness in late 1992 or 1993. Over time, the disease destroyed Reagan's mental capacity. By 1997, he was reported to recognize few people other than his wife, though he continued to walk through parks and on beaches, play golf, and visit his office in nearby Century City. Eventually, his family decided that he would live in quiet semi-isolation with his wife. By the end of 2003, Reagan had lost his ability to speak and was mostly confined to his bed, no longer able to recognize family members.

== Death and funeral ==
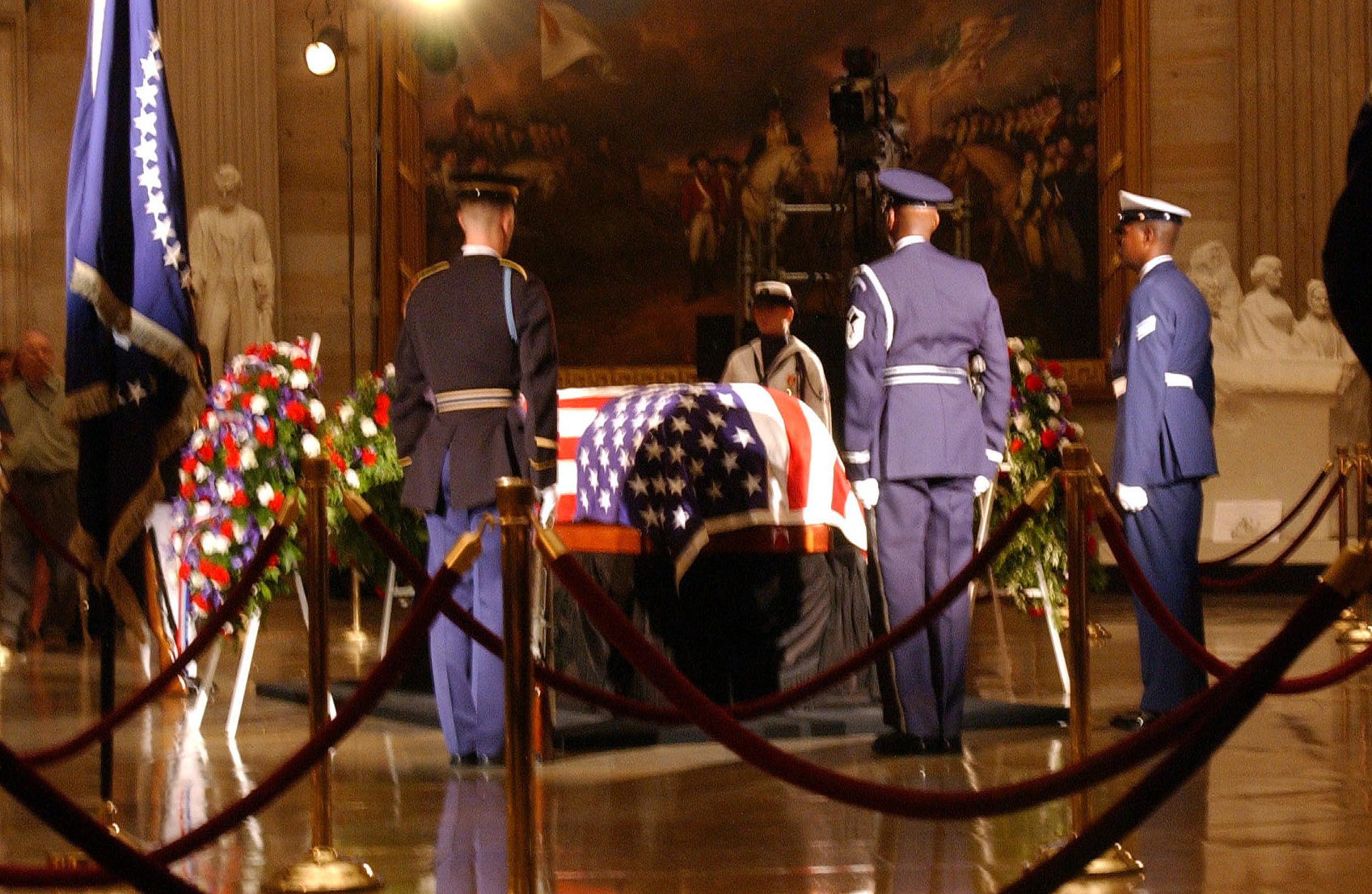
Reagan lying in state in the US Capitol rotunda

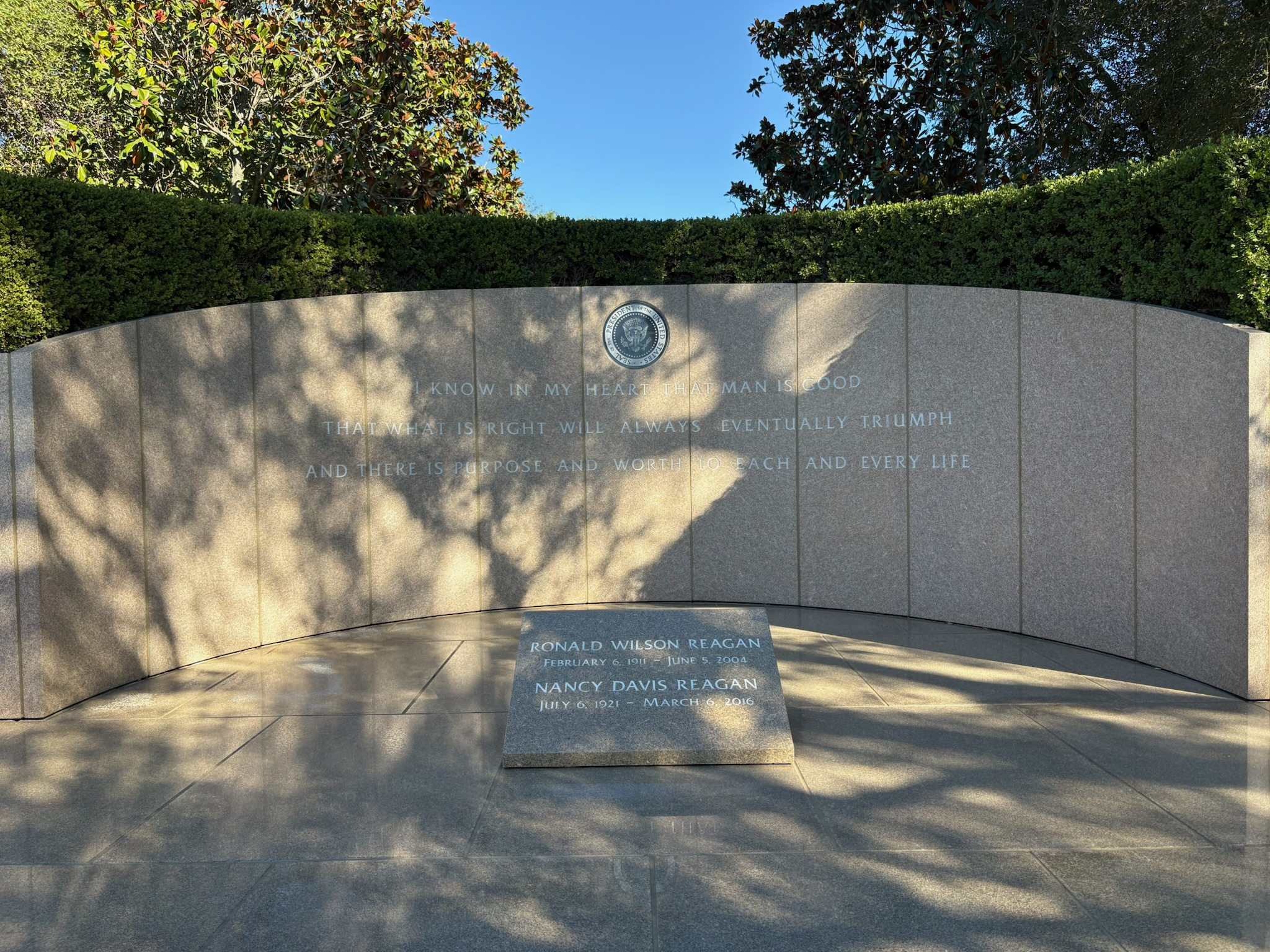
The tomb of Reagan and his wife, Nancy, in October 2025

Reagan died of pneumonia, complicated by Alzheimer's, at his home in Los Angeles, on June 5, 2004. President George W. Bush called Reagan's death "a sad hour in the life of America". His public funeral was held in the Washington National Cathedral, where eulogies were given by Margaret Thatcher, Brian Mulroney, George H. W. Bush, and George W. Bush. Other world leaders attended including Mikhail Gorbachev. Reagan was interred at his presidential library.

== Legacy ==
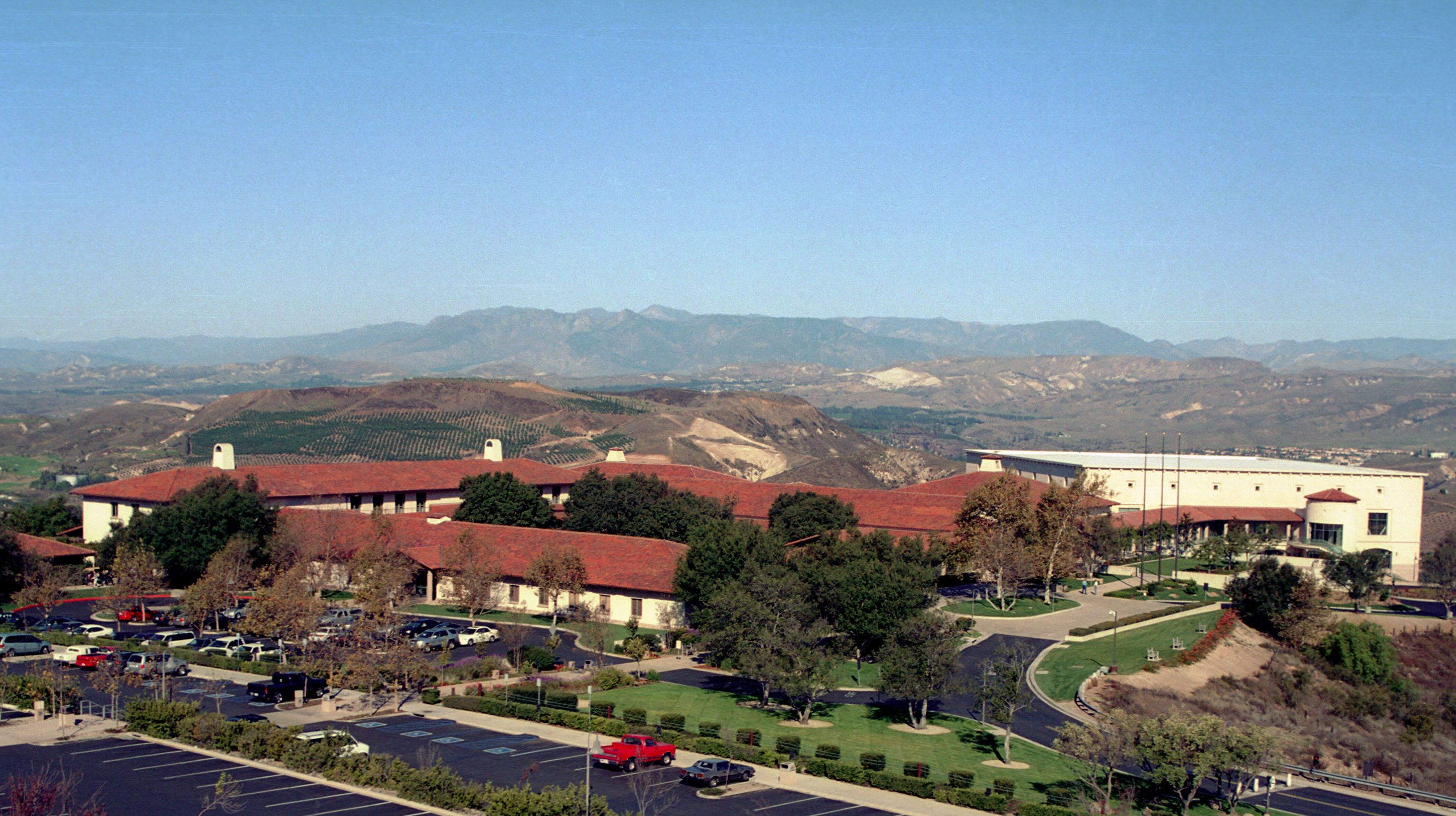
The Ronald Reagan Presidential Library in Simi Valley, California

=== Approval ratings ===
Similar to previous presidents, Reagan began his presidency with approval ratings greater than 50 percent, peaking above 70 percent shortly after his attempted assassination, before declining by the end of his first year. Afterwards, his ratings fluctuated in the mid-30s and mid-40s in his second and third years, which has been attributed to the 1981–1982 recession. His approval ratings rebounded after the invasion of Grenada and by mid-1984 his approval rating neared 60 percent. In the first two years of his second term, his approval ratings were consistently above 60 percent but declined during the Iran–Contra scandal, before beginning to recover in mid-1987. In the Gallup poll, Reagan finished his presidency with an approval rating of 63 percent, the third highest for a departing president in history, behind only Franklin D. Roosevelt and Bill Clinton, both of whom finished at 66 percent.

In 1990, a year after he left office, a Gallup survey found that 54 percent of Americans said they approved of the overall job Reagan did as president. The number of Americans who approved of the Reagan administration declined to 48 percent in 1992 but rebounded two years later to 52 percent. In recent years, favorability of Reagan's presidency reached its highest ever: 71 percent approval in 2006; 74 percent in 2010; 72 percent in 2018; and 69 percent in 2023. He is often found to be second-most popular president since World War II, with only John F. Kennedy having higher ratings.

=== Historical reputation ===
In 2008, British historian M. J. Heale summarized that scholars had reached a broad consensus in which "Reagan rehabilitated conservatism, turned the country to the right, practiced a 'pragmatic conservatism' that balanced ideology with the constraints of government, revived faith in the presidency and American self-respect, and contributed to critically ending the Cold War", which ended with the dissolution of the Soviet Union in 1991. Many conservative and liberal scholars have agreed that Reagan has been the most influential president since Roosevelt, leaving his imprint on American politics, diplomacy, culture, and economics through his effective communication of his conservative agenda and pragmatic compromising. During the initial years of Reagan's post-presidency, historical rankings placed his presidency in the twenties. Throughout the 2000s and 2010s, his presidency was often placed in the top ten.

Many proponents, including his Cold War contemporaries, believe that his defense policies, economic policies, military policies, and hard-line rhetoric against the Soviet Union and communism, together with his summits with Gorbachev, played a significant part in ending the Cold War. Jeffrey Knopf argues that while Reagan's practice of referring to the Soviet Union as "evil" probably made no difference to the Soviet leaders, it possibly gave encouragement to Eastern European citizens who opposed their communist regimes. President Truman's policy of containment is also regarded as a force behind the fall of the Soviet Union, and the Soviet invasion of Afghanistan undermined the Soviet system itself. Nevertheless, Melvyn P. Leffler called Reagan "Gorbachev's minor, yet indispensable partner, setting the framework for the dramatic changes that neither anticipated happening anytime soon".

Critics, for example Paul Krugman, note Reagan's tenure as having begun a period of increased income inequality, sometimes called the "Great Divergence". Krugman also views Reagan as having initiated the ideology of the current-day Republican Party, which he feels is led by "radicals" who seek to "undo the twentieth century" gains in income equality and unionization. Others, such as Nixon's Secretary of Commerce Peter G. Peterson, also criticize what they feel was not just Reagan's fiscal irresponsibility, but also the ushering in of an era where tax cutting "became the GOP's core platform", with resulting deficits and GOP leaders (speciously in Peterson's opinion) arguing supply-side gains would enable the country to "grow" its way out of deficits.

Reagan was known for storytelling and humor, which involved puns and self-deprecation. Reagan also often emphasized family values, despite being the first president to have been divorced. He showed the ability to comfort Americans during the aftermath of the Space Shuttle Challenger disaster. Reagan's ability to talk about substantive issues with understandable terms and to focus on mainstream American concerns earned him the laudatory moniker the "Great Communicator". He also earned the nickname "Teflon President" in that public perceptions of him were not substantially tarnished by the controversies that arose during his administration.

=== Political influence ===
Reagan led a new conservative movement, altering the political dynamic of the United States. Conservatism became the dominant ideology for Republicans, displacing the party's faction of liberals and moderates. Men began voting more Republican, and women began voting more Democrat – a gender distinction that has persisted. He was supported by young voters, an allegiance that shifted many of them to the party. He attempted to appeal to Black voters in 1980, but would receive the lowest Black vote for a Republican presidential candidate at the time. Throughout Reagan's presidency, Republicans were unable to gain complete control of Congress.

The period of American history most dominated by Reagan and his policies (particularly on taxes, welfare, defense, the federal judiciary, and the Cold War) is known as the Reagan era, which suggests that the "Reagan Revolution" had a lasting impact on the United States in domestic and foreign policy. The presidencies of George H. W. Bush, Bill Clinton, and George W. Bush are often treated as an extension of the era. Since 1988, Republican presidential candidates have invoked Reagan's policies and beliefs.

== Bibliography ==
- Dick, Bernard F. (2014). The President's Ladies: Jane Wyman and Nancy Davis. University Press of Mississippi. ISBN 978-1-61703-980-5.
- Evans, Thomas W. (2006). The Education of Ronald Reagan: The General Electric Years and the Untold Story of His Conversion to Conservatism. Columbia University Press. ISBN 978-0-231-13860-4.
- Garrow, David (2007). "Review: Picking up the Books: The New Historiography of the Black Panther Party". Reviews in American History. 35 (4): 650–670. doi:10.1353/rah.2007.0068. JSTOR 30031608.
- Landesman, Fred (2015). The John Wayne Filmography. McFarland & Company. ISBN 978-0-7864-3252-3.
- Reimler, John (1999). "The Rebirth of Racism in Education: The Real Legacy of the Reagan Revolution". Journal of Thought. 34 (2): 31–40. JSTOR 42589574.

Non-profit organization positions
Preceded by Robert Montgomery	President of the Screen Actors Guild; 1947–1952	Succeeded by Walter Pidgeon
Preceded by Howard Keel	President of the Screen Actors Guild; 1959–1960	Succeeded by George Chandler
Party political offices
Preceded by Richard Nixon	Republican nominee for Governor of California; 1966, 1970	Succeeded by Houston I. Flournoy
Preceded by John Chafee	Chair of the Republican Governors Association; 1968–1970	Succeeded by Louie B. Nunn
Preceded by Gerald Ford	Republican nominee for President of the United States; 1980, 1984	Succeeded by George H. W. Bush
Political offices
Preceded by Pat Brown	Governor of California; 1967–1975	Succeeded by Jerry Brown
Preceded by Jimmy Carter	President of the United States; 1981–1989	Succeeded by George H. W. Bush
Diplomatic posts
Preceded by François Mitterrand	Chair of the Group of Seven; 1983	Succeeded by Margaret Thatcher
Awards and achievements
Preceded by Ruhollah Khomeini	Time Person of the Year; 1980	Succeeded by Lech Wałęsa
Preceded by The Computer	Time Person of the Year; 1983; With: Yuri Andropov	Succeeded by Peter Ueberroth
