= National Register of Historic Places listings in Lee County, Illinois =

Location of Lee County in Illinois

This is a list of the National Register of Historic Places listings in Lee County, Illinois.

This is intended to be a complete list of the properties and districts on the National Register of Historic Places in Lee County, Illinois, United States. Latitude and longitude coordinates are provided for many National Register properties and districts; these locations may be seen together in a map.

There are 10 properties and districts listed on the National Register in the county.

This National Park Service list is complete through NPS recent listings posted March 6, 2026.

== Current listings ==
	Name on the Register	Image	Date listed	Location	City or town	Description
1	Amboy Illinois Central Depot	Amboy Illinois Central Depot	August 18, 1992 (#92001015)	50 S. East Ave. 41°42′50″N 89°19′55″W	Amboy	
2	Christopher Brookner House	Christopher Brookner House	November 13, 1984 (#84000319)	222 N. Dixon Ave. 41°50′58″N 89°28′50″W	Dixon	
3	Dixon Downtown Historic District	Dixon Downtown Historic District	March 7, 2012 (#12000059)	Roughly bounded by River St., Dixon Ave., 3rd St., & Monroe Ave. 41°50′34″N 89°29′02″W	Dixon	
4	Illinois Central Stone Arch Railroad Bridges	Illinois Central Stone Arch Railroad Bridges	December 2, 1987 (#87002048)	W. First, W. Second, & W. Third Sts. between Monroe & College Aves. 41°50′26″N 89°29′28″W	Dixon	
5	Lowell Park	Lowell Park	August 8, 2006 (#06000680)	2114 Lowell Park Rd. 41°53′23″N 89°29′43″W	Dixon	
6	Nachusa House	Nachusa House	February 10, 1983 (#83000323)	215 S. Galena Ave. 41°50′32″N 89°28′55″W	Dixon	
7	Ronald Reagan Boyhood Home	Ronald Reagan Boyhood Home	March 26, 1982 (#82002580)	816 S. Hennepin Ave. 41°50′10″N 89°28′51″W	Dixon	
8	William H. Van Epps House	William H. Van Epps House	February 11, 1982 (#82002581)	212 S. Ottawa Ave. 41°50′33″N 89°28′50″W	Dixon	
9	Col. Nathan Whitney House	Col. Nathan Whitney House	November 2, 1990 (#90001726)	1620 Whitney Rd. 41°49′06″N 89°17′37″W	Franklin Grove	
10	Stephen Wright House	Stephen Wright House	May 22, 2005 (#05000433)	612 Chicago Rd. 41°41′33″N 88°59′17″W	Paw Paw	

== See also ==
- List of National Historic Landmarks in Illinois
- National Register of Historic Places listings in Illinois
