= KSB =

KSB may refer to:

- KSB Hospital
- KSB Open, a golf tournament
- Kativik School Board
- Kashmere Stage Band
- Keystone State Boychoir
- KSB SE & Co. KGaA, a German manufacturer
- K. K. Setonaikai Broadcasting (KSB), a Japanese television station

== See also ==
- KSBS (disambiguation)
