= Minnie Gow Walsworth =

American poet (1859–1947)

- Born: Mary Murdock Gow; July 25, 1859; Dixon, Illinois, U.S.
- Died: June 25, 1947 (aged 87)
- Other name: "Minnie"
- Education: Washington Female Seminary
- Occupation: poet
- Spouse: Edgar Douglas Walsworth (m. 1891)
- Writing career
- Notable work: "Luaine"

Minnie Gow Walsworth (July 25, 1859 – June 25, 1947) was an American poet from Illinois. She came from a family of literary and professional pursuits, and began writing poetry before the age of ten. She was a prolific contributor to various periodicals and newspapers throughout her career. Walsworth was also the author of the poem "Luaine", which was considered her most mature and careful work.

== Biography ==
Mary Murdock Gow was born in Dixon, Illinois, July 25, 1859. Her family was one of the earliest to settle in western Pennsylvania. Her family's ancestors included people of literary and professional pursuits. Her grandfather, John L. Gow, of Washington, Pennsylvania, was a writer of poetry and prose. Her father, Alex M. Gow, was a prominent educator and editor in Pennsylvania and Indiana. He was the author of "Good Morals and Gentle Manners," a book used in the public schools of the U.S.

Before Minnie was ten years of age, her poetic productions were numerous and showed a precocious imagination and unusual grace of expression. Minnie's sister, Sybil, was also a poet.

Walsworth was a graduate of Washington Female Seminary.

On December 4, 1891, she married Edgar Douglas Walsworth, of Fontanelle, Iowa, to which place she had removed with her family a few years previous.

She was a contributor to the New York Independent, Interior, St. Nicholas Wide Awake, Literary Life, Presbyterian Banner, and other periodicals.

Her works appeared in several newspapers, such as Iowa County Democrat, Los Angeles Herald. News-Journal, "Luaine", a poem, contained her most mature and careful work.

Minnie Gow Walsworth died June 25, 1947.
