= Christopher Brookner House =

Historic house in Illinois, United States

- U.S. National Register of Historic Places
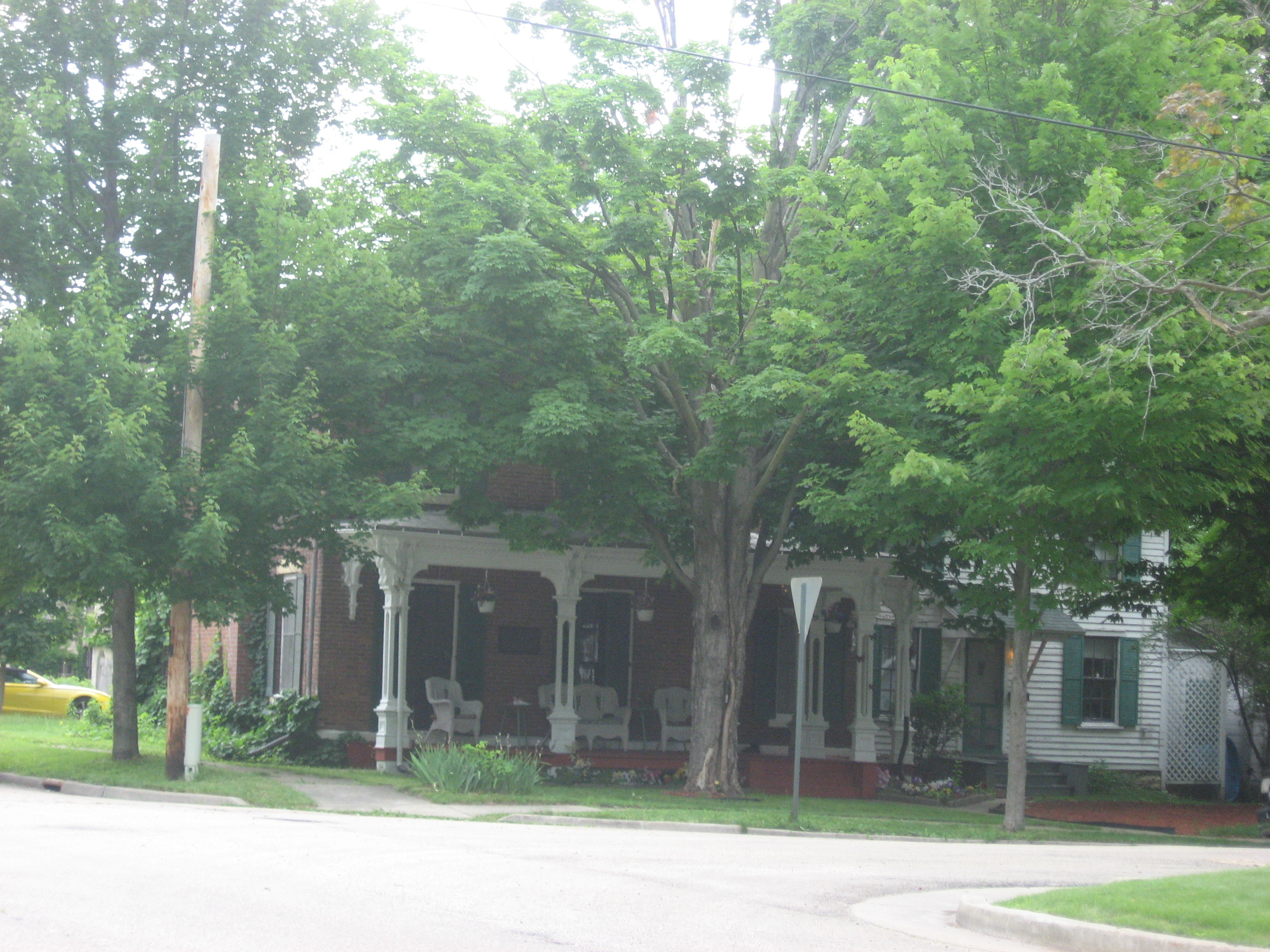

- Location within Illinois Location within the United States
- Location: 222 N. Dixon Ave., Dixon, Illinois
- Coordinates: 41°50′58″N 89°28′50″W
- Area: 0.2 acres (0.081 ha)
- Built: 1861–2
- Built by: Brookner, Christopher
- Architectural style: Italianate, Federal, Greek Revival
- NRHP reference No.: 84000319
- Added to NRHP: November 13, 1984

The Christopher Brookner House is a historic house located at 222 North Dixon Avenue in Dixon, Illinois. Original owner Christopher Brookner, a carpenter and early Dixon resident, built the house in 1861 or 1862. The house's design is primarily Italianate, which is reflected in its front porch, tall windows, bracketed cornice, and hipped roof. The Federal style can also be seen in the house, particularly in its window treatments and its simple brick exterior. The main entrance to the house has a Greek Revival design, adding a third style to the house's architecture.

The house was added to the National Register of Historic Places on November 13, 1984.
