= KSBS =

KSBS may refer to:

- KSBS-FM, a radio station (92.1 FM) licensed to serve Pago Pago, American Samoa
- KSBS-CD, a low-power digital television station (channel 19, virtual 10) licensed to serve Denver, Colorado, United States
- KMHC, a television station (channel 10, virtual 24) licensed to Steamboat Springs, Colorado, United States, which used the KSBS-TV call sign from 1987 to 2000
- the ICAO code for Steamboat Springs Airport
