= William H. Van Epps House =

Historic house in Illinois, United States

- U.S. National Register of Historic Places
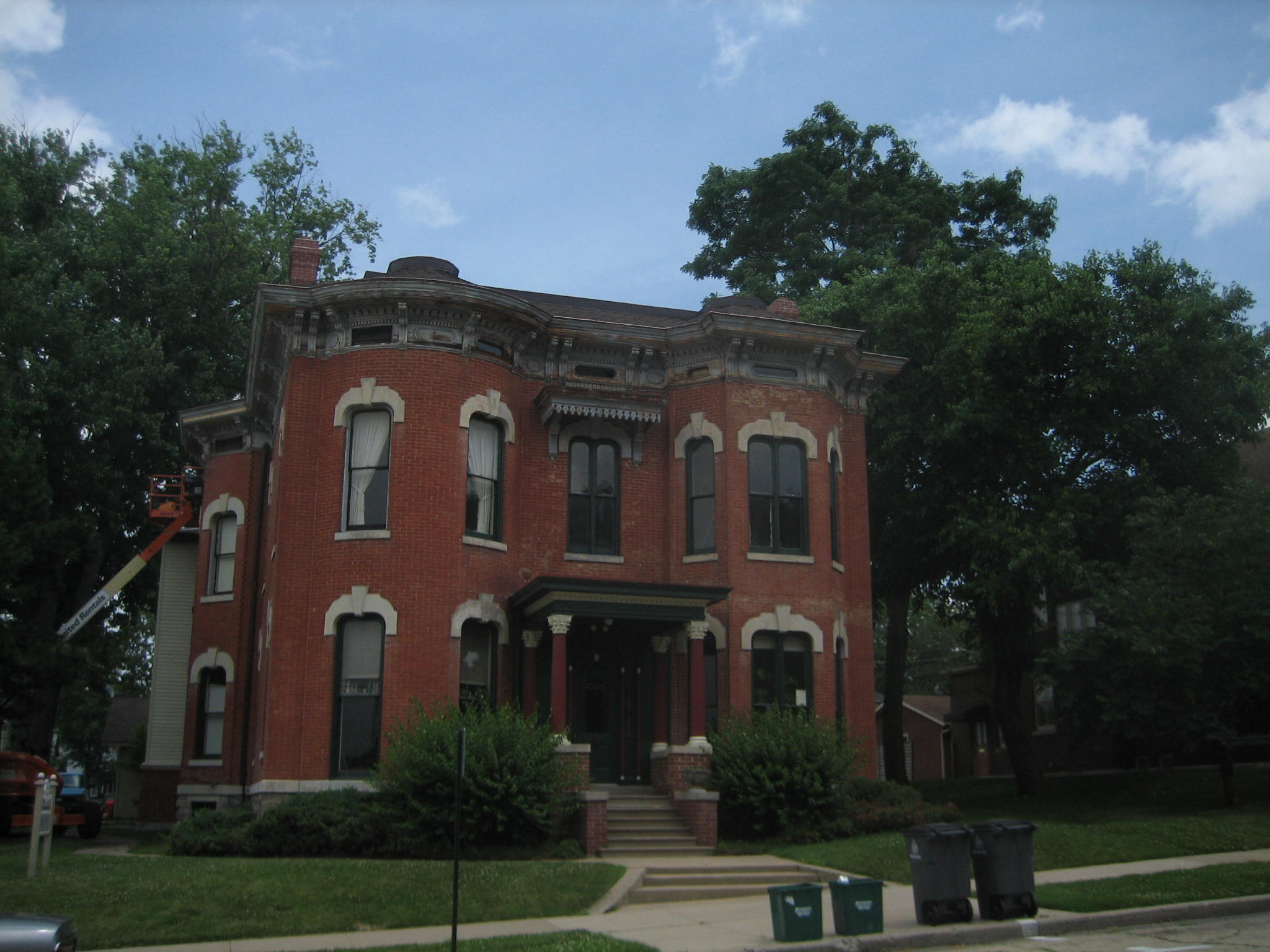

- Location within Illinois Location within the United States
- Location: 212 S. Ottawa Ave., Dixon, Illinois
- Coordinates: 41°50′31″N 89°28′52″W
- Area: 0.3 acres (0.12 ha)
- Built: 1855
- Architectural style: Italianate
- NRHP reference No.: 82002581
- Added to NRHP: February 11, 1982

The William H. Van Epps House is a historic house in Dixon, Illinois. It is an example of Italianate architecture. and was constructed around 1855. The Van Epps House was added to the U.S. National Register of Historic Places in 1982.

== History ==
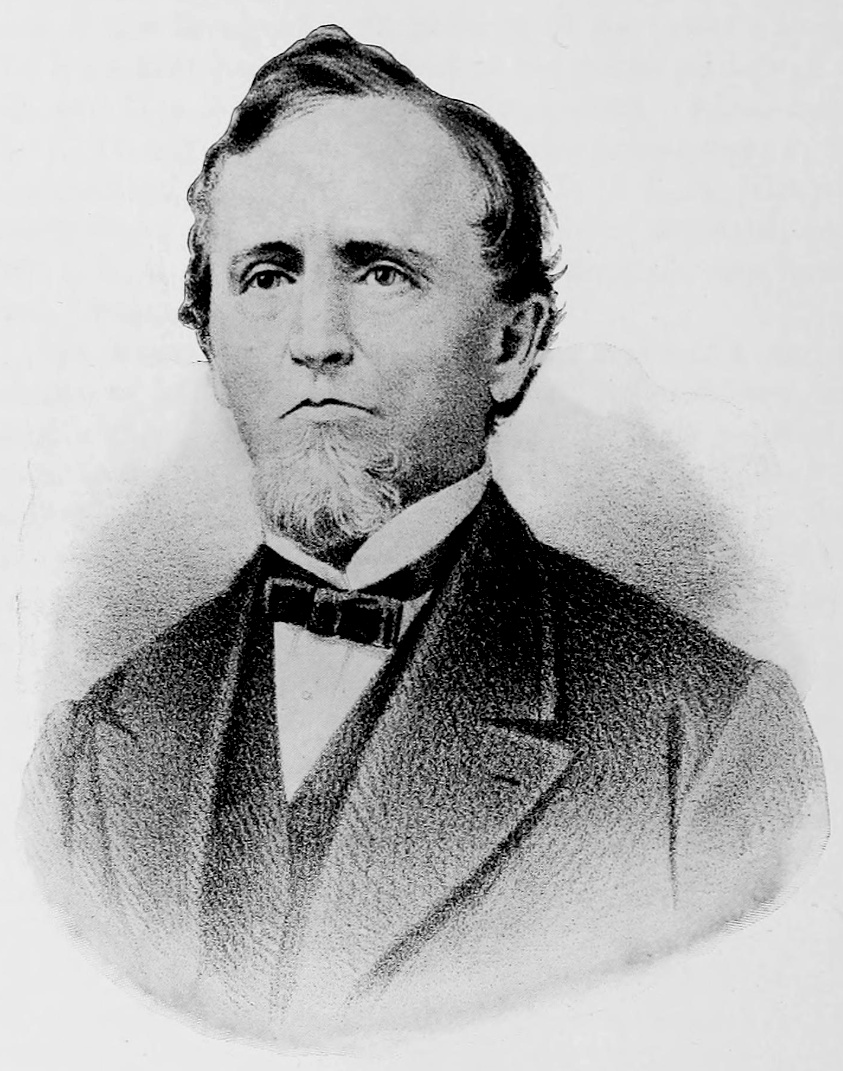
William H. Van Epps

The William H. Van Epps House was constructed for William H. Van Epps c. 1855. Van Epps was an early settler, prominent in politics, agriculture, and business who arrived in Dixon in 1854 and stayed until he died in 1877. Presently, the building is occupied by an architectural firm.

== Architecture ==
The Van Epps House is an example of Italianate architecture, one of several in Dixon. The rectangular house with projecting octagonal bays has seen some alterations both interior and exterior, though the front facade is largely unchanged. Around 1900 a rear addition was added and in 1926 the building was converted from a single-family dwelling to four apartments.

== Historic significance ==
The Van Epps House is an outstanding example of Italianate architecture. It was cited in the 1970s Illinois Historic Sites Survey as significant for that architecture. The house's location, on the Lee County Courthouse Square, helps contribute to the historical character of the neighborhood through its high visibility and unique architectural features. The house was added to the National Register of Historic Places in 1982.
