= Nachusa House =

- U.S. National Register of Historic Places
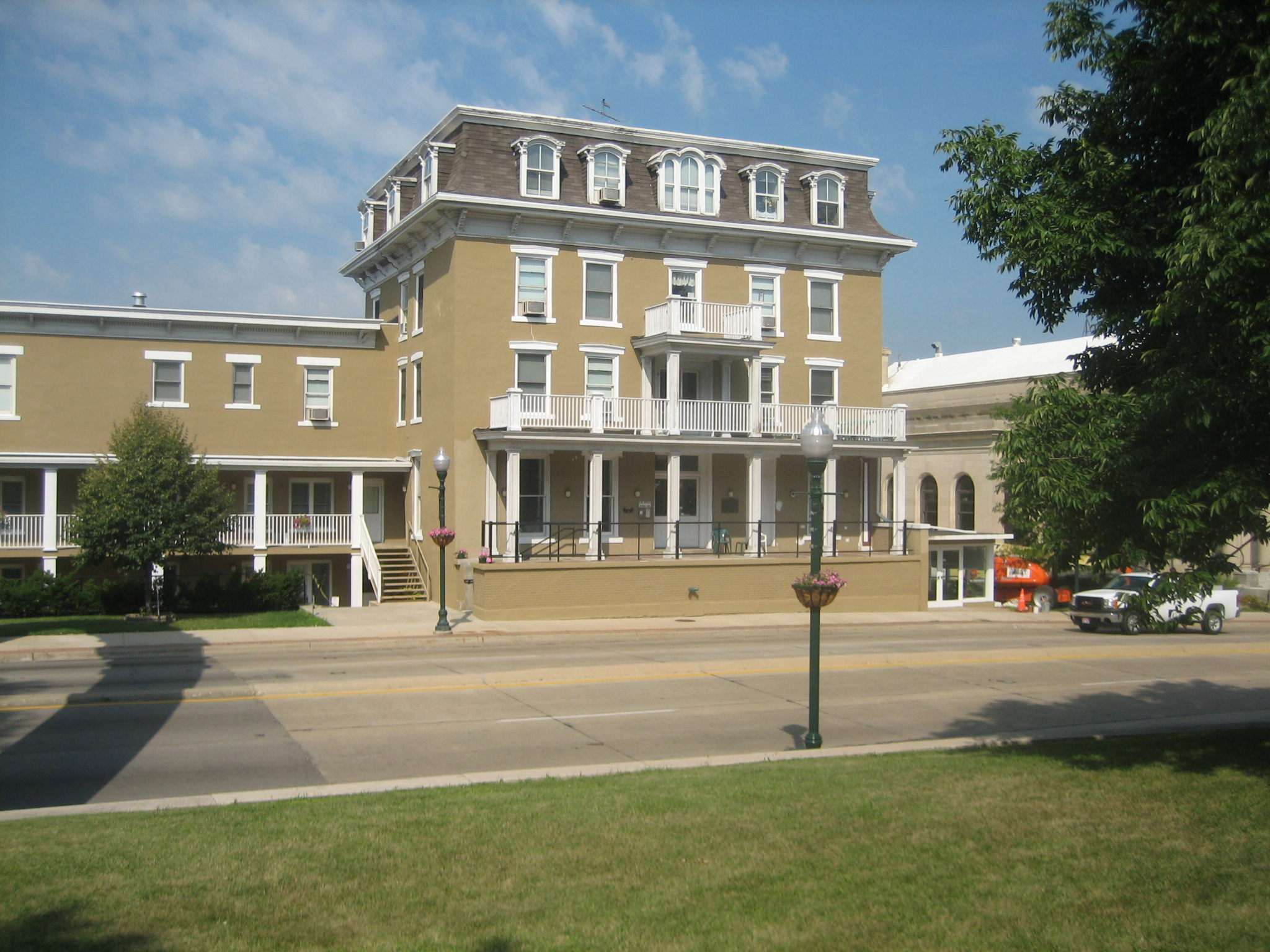

- Location within Illinois Location within the United States
- Location: 5 S. Galena Ave., Dixon, Illinois
- Coordinates: 41°50′33″N 89°28′55″W
- Area: 1 acre (0.40 ha)
- Built: 1853, 1868
- NRHP reference No.: 83000323
- Added to NRHP: February 10, 1983

The Nachusa House is a former hotel building in Dixon, Illinois, United States along Galena Avenue (Illinois Route 26). The building was constructed in 1853 and operated continuously as a hotel until 1988. It underwent many alterations during the time it operated as a hotel. Following its period as a hotel the five-story mansard roofed building fell into disrepair and was nearly demolished in 1997. The building was restored by the Illinois Housing Development Authority and a Chicago developer at a cost of US$3.2 million and renovated into affordable housing for senior citizens. During its height the Nachusa House was a popular stop along rail and stagecoach lines and was a known layover for Abraham Lincoln. The Nachusa House was added to the U.S. National Register of Historic Places in 1983.

== History ==
The Nachusa House was first conceived in 1837 by John Dixon, the founder of Dixon, Illinois, and a group of early settlers when they returned from a trip to the then-state capital of Vandalia. While in Vandalia the group had pushed the state legislature for a charter to establish the Dixon Hotel Company. Money was raised and a foundation laid in 1838 but the Panic of 1837 put a halt to the project.

The Nachusa House was finally constructed in 1853 as a four-story limestone building with simple wooden lintel and sill windows. The structure is perched on a hilltop overlooking the Rock River, directly across the street from the Lee County Courthouse. The hotel gets its unique name from John Dixon. "Na-Chu-Sa" was the name area Native Americans gave to Dixon, meaning "head white hair". During its first years, the early 1850s, the hotel was primarily a stopover on the stagecoach routes from Chicago to Galena, and Peoria. When the railroad came to the city of Dixon in 1855 the Nachusa House grew in popularity with stagecoach travelers as well as those traveling via rail. The Nachusa House layout can be divided into three main components, the main building, the south annex and the west annex.

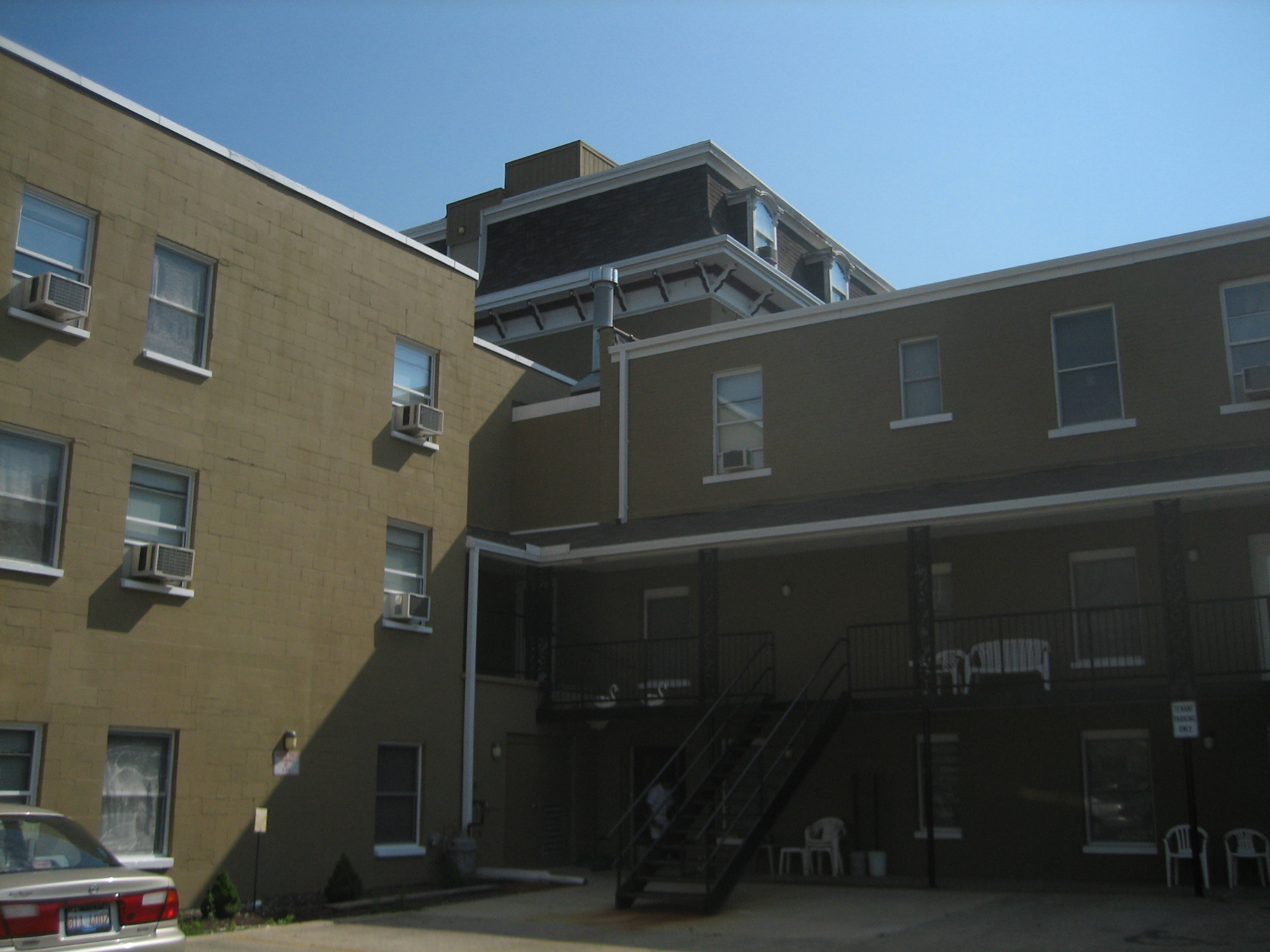
The Nachusa House can be divided into three components, the main building, the south annex and the west annex.

The past commercial success of Nachusa House is reflected through the many changes to its design. The first addition to the hotel was in 1854 when the old west annex was added, this four story, 60 room structure was demolished during the 1950s and rebuilt as it appears today. In 1868 the mansard roof and fifth floor were added to the building; both features were important in solidifying the hotel's image as a first class hotel. Other architectural details were added and removed through the years, including the addition of a thin coat of stucco in the 1880s. In 1914 the building's south annex was added, though it was essentially gutted during the 1950s and very little of the original 1914 structure remains.

When the hotel was listed on the U.S. National Register of Historic Places in 1983 it was one of the oldest continuously operated hotels in the state of Illinois. In 1988 the hotel closed and the building was left vacant and in a rapidly deteriorating state for ten years. In 1996 the Landmarks Preservation Council of Illinois listed the Nachusa House on its top-ten most endangered landmarks list. The hotel seemed destined to be demolished in 1997 when the Illinois Housing Development Authority (IHDA) and a Chicago developer stepped in to save the building, not as a hotel, but as affordable housing for senior citizens.

The $3.2 million restoration project was paid for, in part, through the federal Low Income Housing Tax Credit Program, commonly known as Housing Credits. The program, which dates to 1986, is the primary federal affordable housing resource. The restoration of the building began in 1997, by September there were already names on a waiting list for the 35 apartment units and by 1998 residents were occupying the spaces.

== Architecture ==
The Nachusa House's main, nearly square, building forms the centerpiece of the present-day structure. The main building is the most historically and architecturally significant portion of Nachusa House. Nachusa House's main construction occurred in 1853 and 1868. The 1853 portion of the building stands upon the limestone foundation, laid in 1838. It was built as a four-story limestone building with 2 foot (.6 m) thick walls and wood framed floor and roof construction; originally the limestone walls were undressed. In 1868 the second period of construction on Nachusa House added the fifth floor, mansard roof, and now removed cupola. These alterations established the image that became iconic of the hotel.

After 1868 the building continued to evolve, stucco was added to the stone walls in the 1880s and seventy years later wrought iron grill work was added to the balconies and porches. Galena Avenue was widened in 1965 forcing the removal of the original front stairs which led to the lobby porch.

== Significance ==
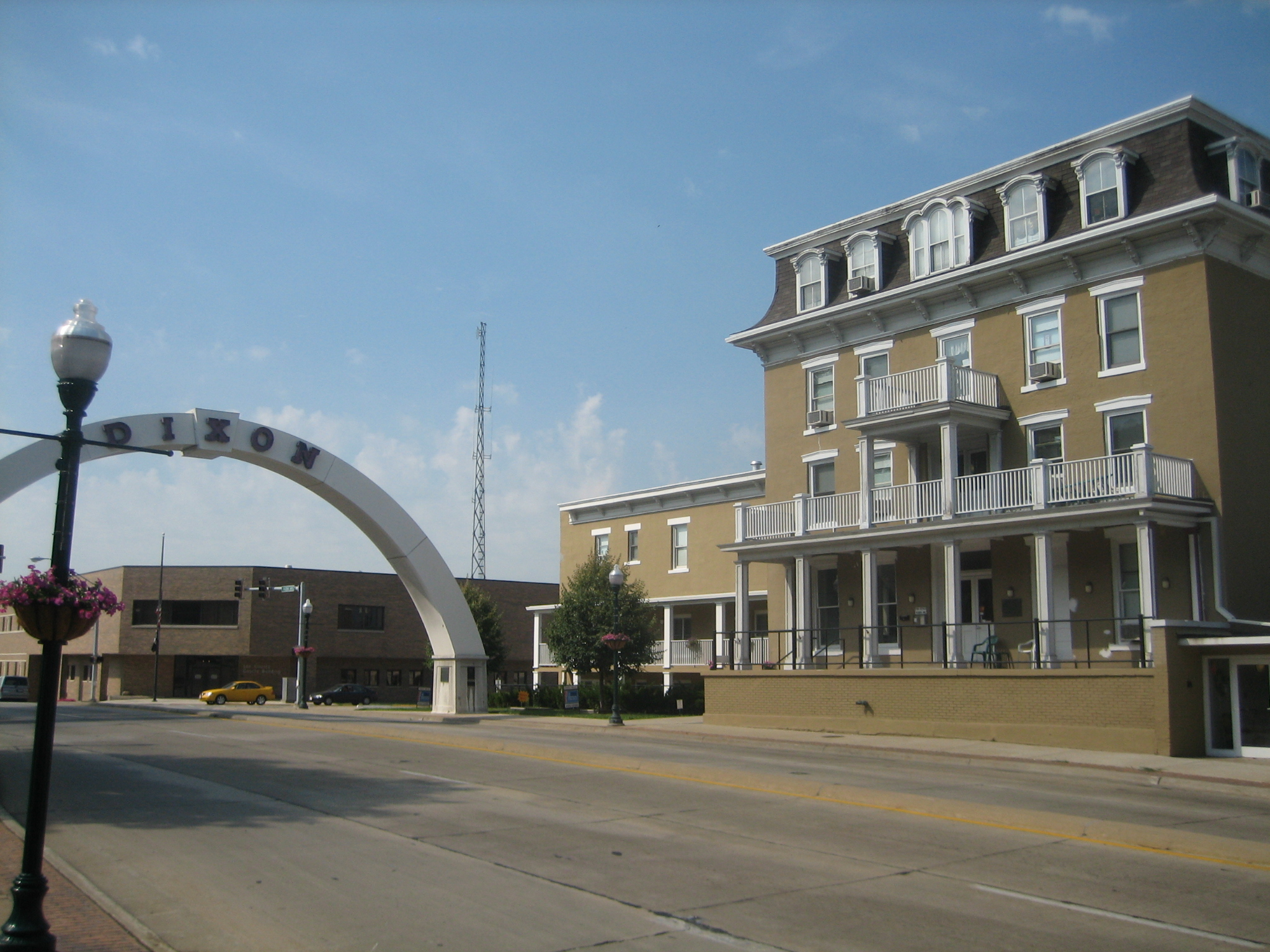
The Nachusa House is considered a "prized landmark" in Dixon, Illinois.

As early as 1878-1879 commentators noted the Nachusa House as one of Dixon's most substantial and eye-catching buildings. The building possesses significance of a social, commercial and architectural nature and was called a "prized landmark" in the 1983 National Register of Historic Places nomination form and the building was added to the National Register on February 10, 1983. The 1974 Illinois Historic Sites Survey cited the structure as "probably" the oldest in Dixon as well as for its commercial and political, significance, the latter because of its guest list.

Throughout its history, the hotel hosted notable guests including U.S. Presidents Abraham Lincoln, Ulysses S. Grant, William Howard Taft, Theodore Roosevelt and President of the Confederate States of America Jefferson Davis. Lincoln stayed at the Nachusa House numerous times and generally occupied the same room. A Lincoln room was established in his honor within the hotel during its later years, the room was furnished much as it was when Lincoln stayed at the hotel. The balcony outside the room was known to be a place where Lincoln would sit and socialize. The room has since been converted into an apartment.
