= Illinois Central Stone Arch Railroad Bridges =

- U.S. National Register of Historic Places
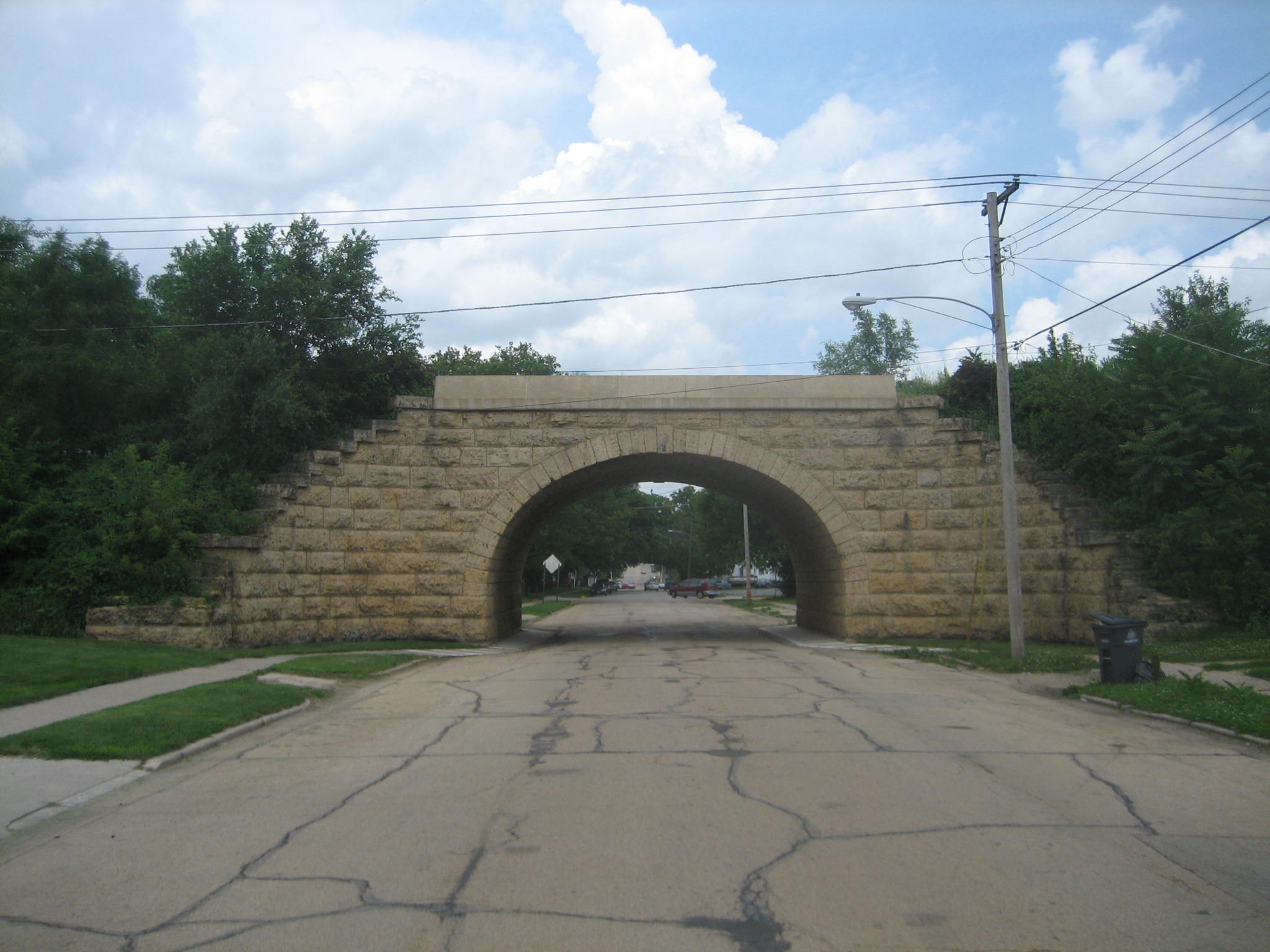
- The stone arch bridge over Second Street in Dixon, Illinois.
- Location: W. First, W. Second, & W. Third Sts. between Monroe & College Aves., Dixon, Illinois
- Coordinates: 41°50′29″N 89°29′23″W
- Area: 2 acres (0.81 ha)
- Built: 1852–1855; 171 years ago
- Architect: Robert F. Laing
- NRHP reference No.: 87002048
- Added to NRHP: December 2, 1987

The Illinois Central Stone Arch Railroad Bridges are a trio of limestone railroad bridges in the city of Dixon, Illinois, United States. The bridges were constructed between 1852 and 1855 as the Illinois Central Railroad laid its first rail lines across the state of Illinois. They were designed by Robert F. Laing for Laing and Douglas Construction Company, a railroad company contractor during the 1850s. Though each limestone bridge is similar in design, they each have different clearances ranging between 12 and 15 feet (3.7 and 4.6 m). The bridges remained in use by the railroad until 1985, and the three bridges were added to the U.S. National Register of Historic Places in 1987.

== History ==
The three bridges were built between 1852 and 1855 from locally quarried limestone as the Illinois Central Railroad (ICRR) built the first railroad lines crossing the state. In the summer of 1851 the Illinois Central began laying its first section of track, from Mendota to Amboy. On March 6, 1852, the route the ICRR would take through Dixon was announced. By 1853 the section was complete and the first locomotives rolled into the city of Amboy, 12 miles (19.3 km) south of Dixon, on November 27, 1853. Amboy's depot would eventually become the Northern Division Headquarters for the Illinois Central Railroad.

The section of railroad that came through Dixon was constructed from 1852 to 1855 partially on a 15-foot (4.6 m) embankment that would cradle the trio of bridges when the project was completed. The bridges were constructed of Galena faced limestone quarried just upstream the Rock River from Dixon at Dement's Quarry. The first train passed over the trio of bridges along West First, Second and Third Streets on February 1, 1855. The arrival of the train prompted the local media to quip of the train, "like a huge chariot of fire on a monstrous beast, it bellowed along -- high above the dwellings." The bridges remained in use by the railroad until December 21, 1985.

== Design ==
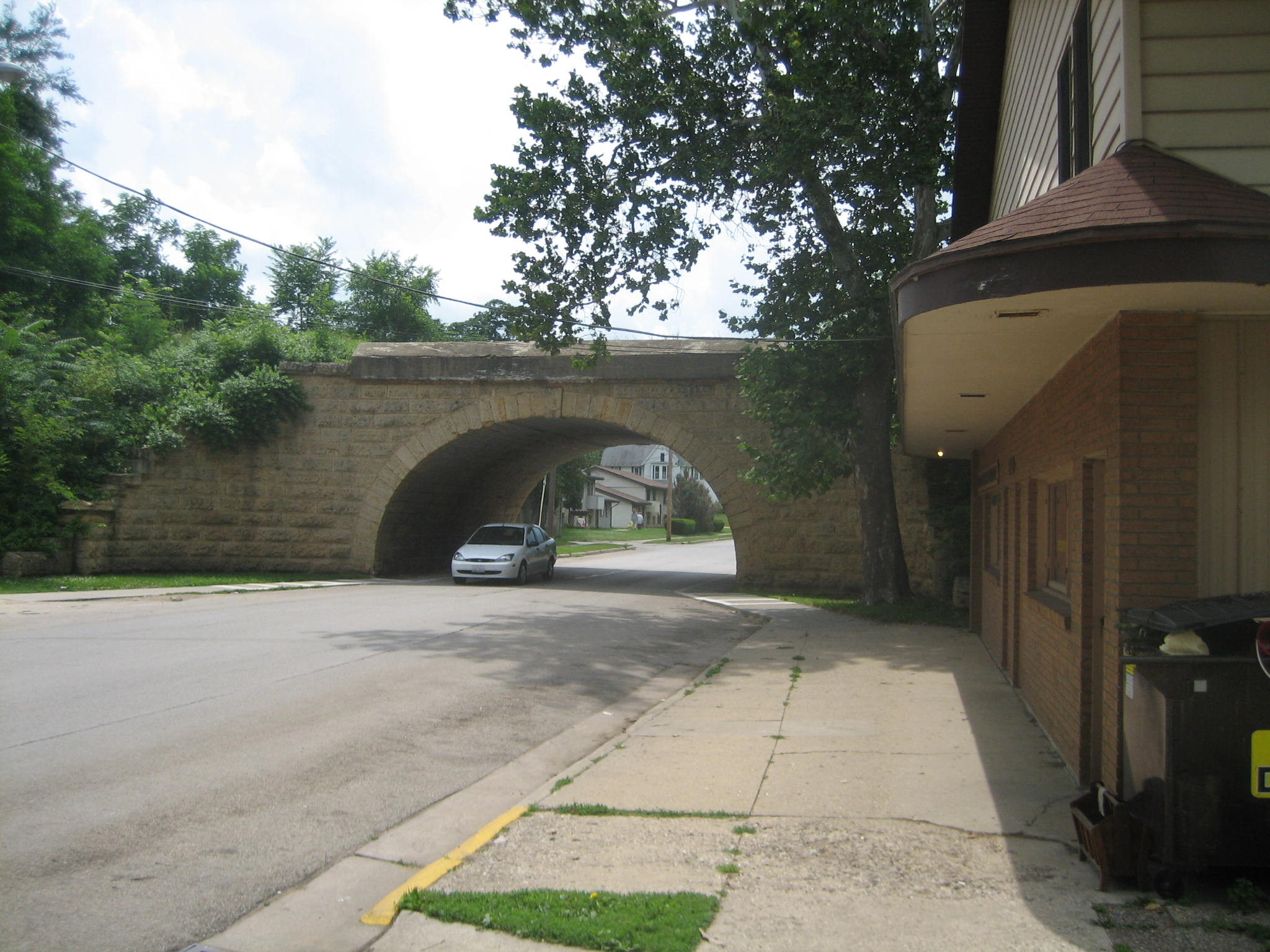
The Third Street bridge, with a 12-foot (3.7 m)) clearance, is the shortest of the three.

The trio of bridges are all similar in design, but they do have differing clearances, which were based upon the topography of the area. The bridges were designed by Robert Finley Laing of Laing and Douglas Construction Company; the company contracted for the ICRR from 1852 to 1853. In addition to designing the three bridges over the city streets in Dixon, Laing also designed the bridge with stone piers that the ICRR took over the Rock River on its way to Freeport. The three stone bridges are set into a 15-foot-high (4.6 m) embankment which stretches from West Seventh Street to the Rock River, the span includes the three stone arch bridges.

The yellowed limestone was cut to fit and is held together using no bond. Instead there are stone "keys" cut and notched into the rock which prevents the stones from slipping. The stone is of a plain ashlar masonry type and either cut or dimension stone. The stone's facing varies depending upon its location within the structure of the bridges. The arch stones are finished with a chiseled face while the wingwall and arch bases are finished with a rock face. There have been almost no alterations of the original structures besides a limited attempt at tuckpointing between 1912 and 1915.

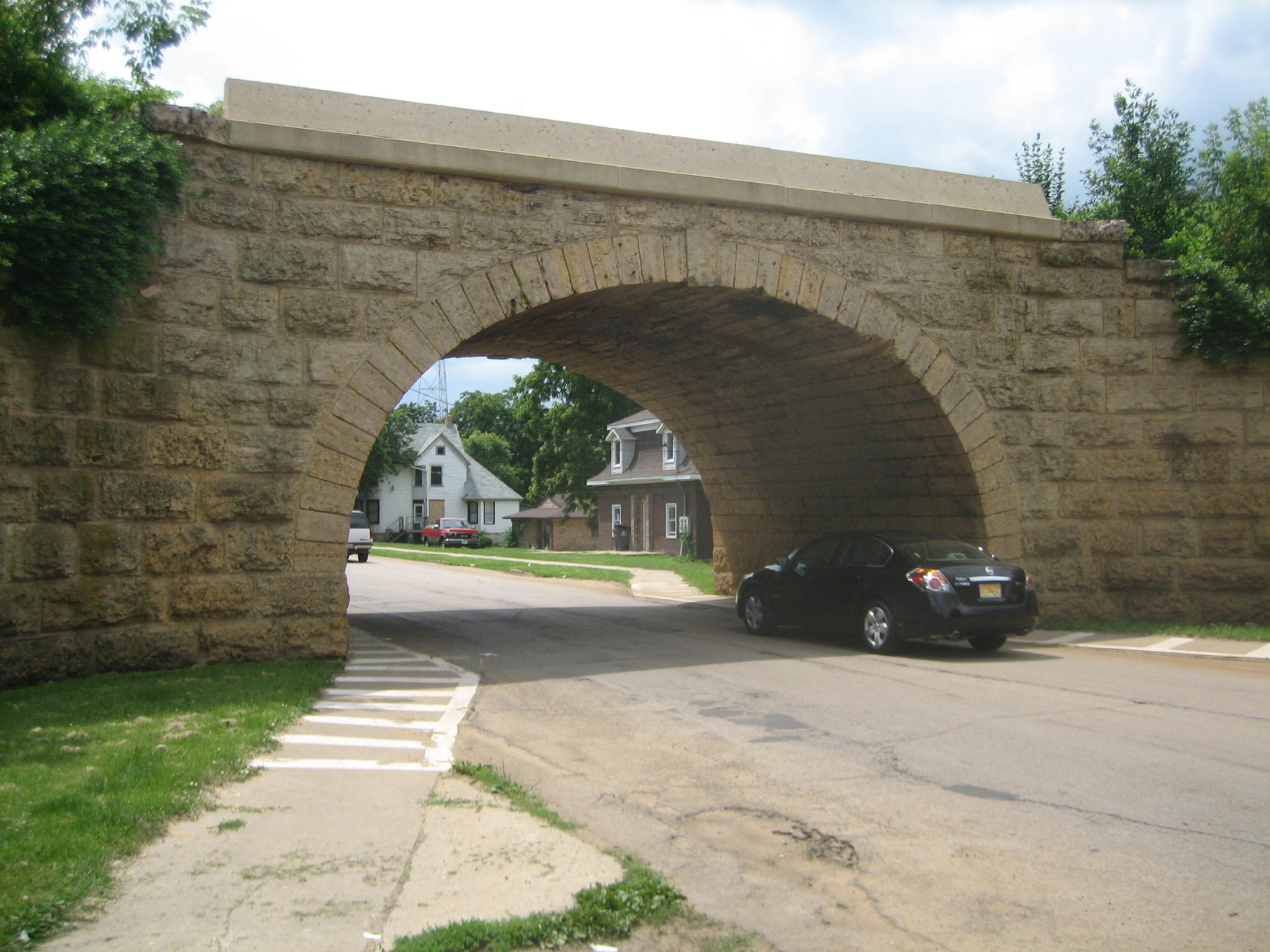
The First Street bridge has the shortest depth at 28 feet (8.5 m).

Each bridge is of a different height. The bridge spanning First Street has 14 ft (4.3 m) of clearance, the Second Street bridge, also the tallest, has 15 ft (4.6 m) clearance and the Third Street Bridge has a clearance of 12 ft (3.7 m). Because of its short height the Third Street Bridge is sometimes referred to as "Little Sister." All three bridges have the same arch span, 28 ft (8.5 m), but each has a differing depth. The longest of the three bridges is the Little Sister Bridge which has a 38-foot (12 m) depth. The bridge at First has a 28 ft (8.5 m) depth and the bridge at Second Street a 34 ft (10 m) depth. The wingwalls on each bridge extends 33 ft (10 m) at their bases.

== Significance ==
The three bridges are the only ones of their type still extant in Lee County, Illinois. They are also significant for their association with the Illinois Central Railroad and its beginnings. With the arrival of the Illinois Central Railroad to Dixon, business and industry followed allowing Dixon to grow and prosper. The increase in population in the Dixon area over many years was a direct result of the arrival of the ICRR. There was an attempt by the city government to tear down the arches but the local citizens protested and the bridges were saved. The three bridges were listed on the U.S. National Register of Historic Places, as part of the same listing, on December 2, 1987.

== See also ==
- Amboy Illinois Central Depot
