= OSF Saint Katharine Medical Center =

Coordinates: 41°50′40″N 89°28′47″W

OSF Saint Katharine Medical Center is a hospital in Dixon, Illinois. OSF Saint Katharine is an 80-bed acute care facility providing comprehensive ancillary services, including emergency medicine, obstetrics, inpatient psychiatry, a cardiovascular laboratory, outpatient surgery, inpatient surgery, and intensive care, among others.

== History ==
In May 1895 Judge Solomon H. Bethea purchased land for $3,500 and gave it to the City of Dixon for the establishment of a hospital in the memory of his wife, Katherine Shaw Bethea, who in her short lifetime had been deeply interested in the establishment of a hospital for Dixon, and during her last illness frequently expressed the wish that such work might be accomplished in the near future.

On May 27, 1895, Mayor Charles H. Hughes informed the City Council of this gift. An ordinance was passed to establish and maintain a hospital for the use and benefit of the citizens of Dixon. This ordinance, dated November 1, 1895, also stated that the Mayor, with the approval of the City Council, appoint a board of nine women directors chosen from the citizens at large, which would be authorized to accept the donations of money and real or personal property in the name of the hospital.

The hospital began its activities January 5, 1897 with 17 beds. The funds for the first building, which cost $7,250, were raised by individuals, churches, and city organizations.

In 1909 Judge Bethea died, leaving his Palmyra farmlands to the hospital as an endowment.

Shortly after the hospital was opened, the KSB Hospital School for Nurses began educating young women who studied for a three-year term to become registered nurses.

In 1913 a third story and an addition was added creating a 40-bed capacity. This was financed by Miss Elizabeth Shaw, sister of Katherine Shaw Bethea, and one of the first hospital board members.

In 1925, the Nurses Home, providing housing for 25 nurses, was built at a cost of $38,000.

Another addition was built in 1926 at a cost of $47,000, enlarging the hospital to a 60-bed capacity and adding two solaria for the comfort and enjoyment of patients.

The generosity of Dr. Samuel Houston of Polo and the perseverance of the board members, under the able leadership of Mrs. W. H. Coppins, made possible the 1941 addition which cost $130,000. This provided 13 new private rooms, 4 semi‑private rooms, two additional five-bed wards, a nursery, an operating room, an x‑ray room, and kitchen and dining rooms. This addition brought KSB Hospital to an 89-bed capacity.

In November 1957, the board authorized a $1,250,000 hospital expansion program and launched a drive for $750,000 in public subscriptions to finance the major portion of the project. A half‑million dollars in capital funds was already in hand from Miss Bess P. Eells, Miss Helen Brinton, the Ford Foundation and other gifts and bequests which had been accumulated over a period of years.

This project was completed in 1960 and provided 44 desperately needed beds plus space for central supply, laboratory, x‑ray, operating rooms, recovery rooms, kitchen, dining room, and laundry.

In 1967, it once again became necessary to expand the facilities. The 1970 addition increased hospital capacity by 80 beds and remodeled the 1941 building. This project was financed by $365,000 of hospital reserve funds in conjunction with a $2.2 million in bonds issued through B.C. Ziegler.

The 1970s also saw the establishment of many modern service lines. A twenty-four-hour emergency room began operations in July 1971. In March 1972, the first male member of the Board of Directors was sworn in, and the board completed the sale of the 698-acre Bethea farm in Palmyra in October 1972. A seven-bed intensive care unit opened in February 1972, and a $2 million clinic was opened and occupied by early physicians with the Medical Arts Clinic in July 1977. March 1978 saw the opening of the 17-bed inpatient psychiatric unit.

In 1988, KSB Hospital purchased Commerce Towers and soon after constructed a walkway over Crawford Street to connect the building to the hospital. Physician offices and Materials Management were the first to occupy the new space.

In January 1989 a new emergency room was opened at the far west end of the hospital, and included a two-stall ambulance garage. The ER had four treatment bays, two trauma bays and a new x-ray room.

The spring of 1990 brought a newly remodeled cafeteria and vending machine area. In 1991, the psychiatry unit was downsized from 26 beds to 16 beds and moved from 3rd floor west to 2nd floor east. The new psychiatry unit featured improved safety and security features for patients and employees, and included a new eating area, therapy facilities, video monitoring, outside patio, patient lounge, and an isolation room.

By 1991, the Medical Arts Clinic, founded by Dr. E. S. Murphy and Dr. J. G. McFetridge had grown into a multi-speciality group of more than twenty physicians and had outgrown the 1977 addition. MAC moved to a large office building downtown that had been built for the USF&G Insurance Company. The space vacated by MAC was renamed The Annex and became home to several hospital departments, including Medical Records, Patient Accounts, Accounting, Education, Human Resources, Data Processing, Medical Staff, Administration, and included a physician lounge, library, a renal dialysis unit, and space for the Red Cross and Lee County Volunteer Care Clinic.

In 1992 the Holly and Avis Campbell Surgical Wing was opened. After nearly two years of construction, this 7,500-square-foot addition offered three new large operating suites and one single use cystoscopy suite for urological procedures. The Campbell estate of $6 million has remained as the single largest bequest in KSB Hospital history. The surgical wing addition also provided for a dedicated heliport. Prior to the opening of the heliport, traffic was halted and cars were moved for each flight to allow helicopters to land at street level near the front entrance.

In 1995 the Obstetrics and Nursery units were remodeled and downsized from 11 traditional beds to 7 private birthing suites. The new suites offer a private bath, sleep-in area for family, and a large space for visitors.

In April 1995 Respiratory Therapy, located on 2nd floor just outside the birthing center, moved into newly renovated space on 3rd floor center. This new space included larger staff areas and offices plus new areas for EEG's and pulmonary tests. A Sleep Lab was added to the Respiratory Therapy area in 1998.

In 1996 KSB Hospital opened its first outpatient facility in Oregon, in a new 13,000 square foot building on a 2.5-acre lot at the corner of Route 64 and West Washington Street. Antreas Mesrobian M.D., who had practiced in the Warmolts Clinic since 1978, was joined in the Oregon Clinic by Mark Myers M.D., an Oregon native, in 1997, and by Greg Reckamp M.D. in 1998.

In October 1996 the north half of 3rd floor of Commerce Towers was renovated for a new venture, the Sports and Occupational Medicine Center. This 13,000-square-foot space was staffed by Drs. Gregg Grubb, Philip Zinni, Jon Ortman and Susan Gould and soon had more than 100 local corporations under contract. This department also provided athletic trainers, physical therapists and physicians free to many local school athletic programs.

In 1997, KSB Hospital purchased the substance abuse service line from Rockford Memorial Hospital and renamed it the KSB Recovery Center. This service was expanded in 1998 another recovery center was opened on North Galena in Dixon. Also in 1997, the KSB Adult Day Care Center was opened in the lower level of Edwards Clinic.

A network of clinics was developed with the construction of the Polo Clinic in 1999, the Amboy Clinic in 2002, the opening of the Ashton Clinic in 2001, and the purchase of Edwards Clinic in 2000.

In 2002, the laboratory was renovated and a new CT and MRI machines were purchased by the Medical Imaging department.

In 2003, KSB Hospital was recognized by Arbor Associates for Highest Overall Patient Satisfaction, scoring 96.8% satisfaction, the highest score among all hospitals Arbor surveyed.

In 2004, KSB Hospital purchased Town Square Centre and its primary tenant the Medical Arts Clinic in a $3.8 million deal that added eleven MAC physicians to the KSB Medical Group and significantly expanded hospital property holdings. In July 2004, the first two residents from the University of Illinois College of Medicine at Rockford began work at KSB Hospital as a part of the newly formed Dixon Rural Training Track. Also in 2004, the KSB Foot and Ankle Center opened in Commerce Towers, staffed by Dr. Michael Wessels and Dr. David Yeager.

A new parking lot was added in 2005, on the site formerly occupied by a house for students and interns.

In June 2006, the KSB Cardiovascular Services Lab opened, offering a facility for minimally invasive vascular and cardiac cath services.

In 2007, a major excavation and construction project brought a two-level parking deck to the front of KSB Hospital.

A new MRI was purchased in 2008 that offered more space for patients and better quality images for physicians. Because of its size and weight, a hole was cut into the wall of the MRI room and a crane hoisted the machine into place. At the same time, a new elevator was added to the west end of the hospital, serving the basement through 4th floor.

Also in 2008, KSB Hospital began installation of a computerized nurse documentation system, the first in a series of software products necessary for electronic health records.

In 2010, the sleep lab was renovated and expanded in Commerce Towers, and, in October, half of a new emergency department was completed and opened. Crawford Street south of 1st Street was vacated by the City of Dixon and closed to traffic to allow KSB Hospital to level off and build a new parking lot for the emergency department.

The $16 million expansion of outpatient surgery and the emergency department was completed in the fall of 2011. The expansion included two new surgical suites, recovery rooms, registration and reception areas, new emergency department rooms and trauma bays, and a new three-stall ambulance garage.

In 2011, KSB Hospital received the Outstanding Patient Experience Award from HealthGrades, in which KSB scored in the top 5% of more than 3,700 U.S. hospitals surveyed. In August, KSB Hospital conducted an employee and found 86.2% satisfaction on a survey in which 94% of employees participated—both percentages were benchmarks among all hospitals in the survey pool. KSB Medical Group was also awarded by Arbor Associates for exceeding patient expectations in the medical office setting.

On January 1, 2025, OSF HealthCare acquired KSB Hospital and renamed the medical center to OSF St. Katharine Medical Center. The name change honored the previous name honoring Katherine Shaw Bethea and aligned it OSF's tradition of naming its facilities after Catholic Saints by naming it after Saint Katharine Drexel, an American.

== Today ==
KSB Hospital provides healthcare services in nine locations in the Sauk Valley area. KSB Hospital, Commerce Towers, Town Square Centre, Edwards Clinic, KSB Eye & Vision Center, KSB Center for Health Services - Amboy Clinic, KSB - Ashton Clinic, KSB Center for Health Services - Oregon Clinic, KSB Center for Health Services - Polo Clinic,

== Mission statement ==
The mission of Katherine Shaw Bethea Hospital is "to restore, maintain, and enhance health by providing superior care now and in the future."
