= Dixon, Illinois =

- City
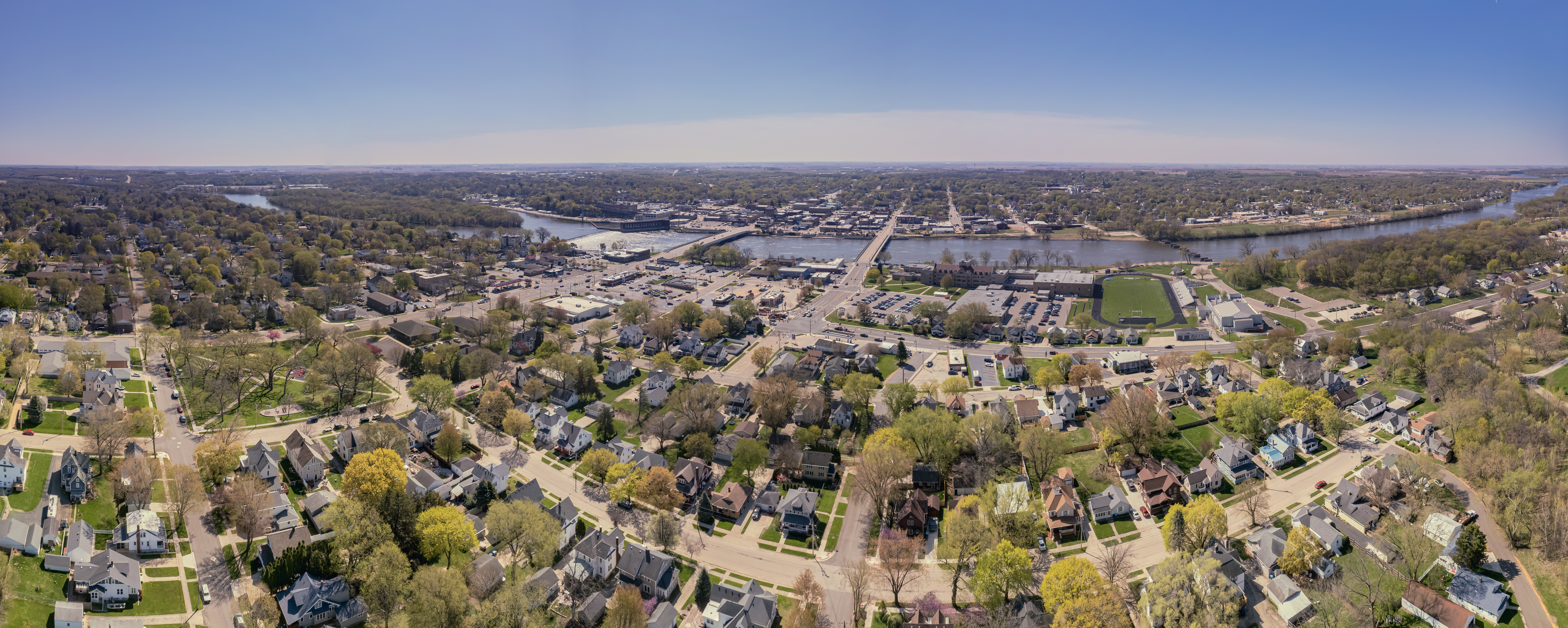
- Aerial view of Dixon, Illinois

- Flag Seal
- Nickname: Petunia City
- Interactive map of Dixon, Illinois
- Location within Illinois Location within the United States
- Coordinates: 41°50′56″N 89°29′36″W
- Country: United States
- State: Illinois
- County: Lee

Area
  - Total: 8.79 sq mi (22.76 km^{2})
  - Land: 8.48 sq mi (21.96 km^{2})
  - Water: 0.31 sq mi (0.80 km^{2})
- Elevation: 646 ft (197 m)

Population (2020)
  - Total: 15,274
  - Density: 1,801.7/sq mi (695.64/km^{2})
- Time zone: UTC−6 (CST)
  - Summer (DST): UTC−5 (CDT)
- ZIP code: 61021, 61022, 61023
- Area code: 815
- FIPS code: 17-20162
- GNIS ID: 2394537
- Website: www.dixongov.com

Dixon is a city in Lee County, Illinois, United States, and its county seat. The population was 15,274 as of the 2020 census. The city is named after founder John Dixon, who operated a rope ferry service across the Rock River, which runs through the city. The Illinois General Assembly designated Dixon as "Petunia Capital of Illinois" in 1999 and "The Catfish Capital of Illinois" in 2009.

Dixon was the boyhood home of former U.S. President Ronald Reagan. The city is also the site of the Lincoln Monument State Memorial, marking the spot where Abraham Lincoln joined the Illinois militia at Fort Dixon in 1832 during the Black Hawk War. The memorial is located on the west side of Dixon's main north–south street, Galena Avenue (U.S. Route 52, also Illinois Route 26), north of the Rock River. The city is also the site of the Dixon Bridge Disaster of 1873, the worst road bridge disaster in American history. A marker for the disaster stands near the Lincoln Statue, on the north bank of the river.

== History ==
Around 1828, Joseph Ogee, a man of mixed French and Native American descent, established a ferry and a cabin along the banks of the Rock River. In 1829, an employee of Ogee was named postmaster at the newly constructed post office. John Dixon, the eponymous founder, bought Ogee's Ferry in the spring of 1830 and brought his family to his newly purchased establishment on April 11 of that year. Shortly after, the name of the post office was changed to Dixon's Ferry.

On May 4, 1873, the Truesdell Bridge collapsed resulting in the deaths of 46 people. About 150-200 people were on the bridge in order to watch a baptism ceremony in the river below.

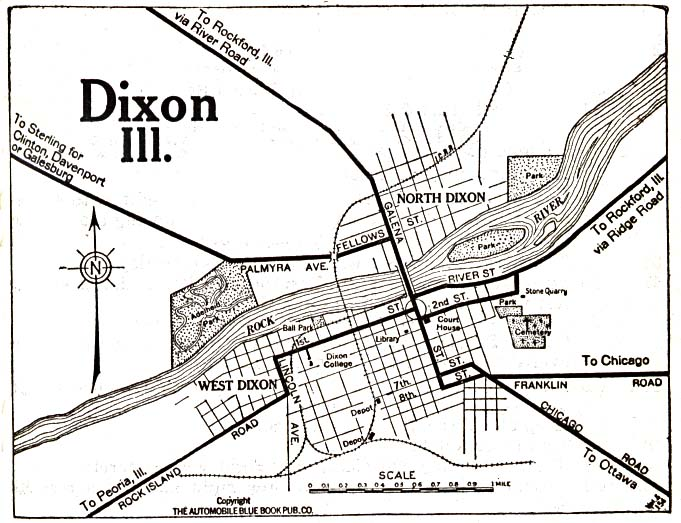
Map of Dixon in 1919

Running by Interstate 88 is a road named Bloody Gulch Road. The road is named after a murder and body disposal. On September 12, 1885, two young men walked along a county road south of Dixon, one a farm hand named Joseph M. Mosse and the other, Frank C. Thiel, a traveling salesman from Elgin, IL. The unemployed farmhand told the salesman of a place he could sell his Bibles and proceeded to take him to a farm where he had worked. As the two men passed a gulch the farmhand struck and killed the salesman with a knife and a walnut baluster he was seen carrying under his arm. He then buried the body in the culvert. The body was later discovered when cattle refused to use the underpass en route to a milking barn. An overnight rain had washed away some of the dirt exposing a limb. When the sheriff arrived to question the farm hand, since he was seen leaving Dixon with the deceased, he pretended to get a drink while throwing a watch chain taken from the salesman in the bushes. The evidence was found and the farmhand was eventually put in jail for life, while the road over the underpass began to be called Bloody Gulch Road.

In April 2012, Dixon Municipal Comptroller Rita Crundwell was indicted by a Federal Grand Jury for embezzlement. She used the embezzled funds to pay for her lavish lifestyle and what became one of the nation's best-known quarter horse-breeding programs, among other things. Crundwell's crimes, thought to be the most substantial municipal theft in U.S. history, impacted Dixon's finances severely. Federal prosecutors estimated the amount embezzled at $53 million since 1990. The city sued the auditors who had failed to detect the embezzlement and the bank at which Crundwell maintained a secret account, and received $40 million in settlements. In February 2013, Crundwell was sentenced to almost 20 years in prison.

On May 16, 2018, Matthew Milby, a 19-year-old student, entered Dixon High School and fired shots during graduation practice. He was pursued by School Resource Officer Mark Dallas, of the Dixon Police Department. After firing shots at the officer, the shooter was wounded by Dallas as he returned fire. Milby was then taken into custody. There were no additional injuries. Milby was diagnosed with schizotypal personality disorder and initially found unfit to stand trial. On July 14, 2022, he pleaded guilty to aggravated discharge of a firearm towards a peace officer and aggravated discharge of a firearm in a school building; he was sentenced to thirty years in prison.

=== Ronald Reagan ===
Dixon was the childhood home of the 40th President of the United States, Ronald Reagan. Reagan was born in nearby Tampico and moved to Dixon, aged nine. In his teen years, he lifeguarded along the banks of the Rock River. His family house is preserved at 816 South Hennepin Avenue, and authorized by Congress to become the Ronald Reagan Boyhood Home. On February 6, 1984, during his first term as president, Reagan returned to Dixon to celebrate his 73rd birthday. He toured his boyhood residence and the city held a parade in his honor.

== Geography ==
According to the 2021 census gazetteer files, Dixon has a total area of 8.17 square miles (21.16 km^{2}), of which 7.75 square miles (20.07 km^{2}) (or 94.93%) is land and 0.41 square miles (1.06 km^{2}) (or 5.07%) is water.

=== Climate ===
Dixon has a hot summer humid continental climate (Köppen: Dfa) with four seasons. The winters are generally cold and see frequent snowfall, while the summers are warm and humid. Typically Dixon ranges from a low of 10 °F (-12 °C) to a high of 82 °F (28 °C). A low of -32 °F (-35 °C) was recorded during the January–February 2019 North American cold wave, and a record high of 110 °F (43 °C) was recorded during the 1936 North American heat wave. Average monthly precipitation ranges from 1.43 inches (36 mm) in February to 4.88 inches (124 mm) in June.

Climate data for Dixon, Illinois (1991–2020 normals, extremes 1893–present)
Month	Jan	Feb	Mar	Apr	May	Jun	Jul	Aug	Sep	Oct	Nov	Dec	Year
Record high °F (°C)	65 (18)	71 (22)	87 (31)	93 (34)	105 (41)	106 (41)	110 (43)	103 (39)	102 (39)	95 (35)	81 (27)	68 (20)	110 (43)
Mean daily maximum °F (°C)	29.0 (−1.7)	33.6 (0.9)	46.3 (7.9)	59.9 (15.5)	71.0 (21.7)	79.8 (26.6)	82.7 (28.2)	81.4 (27.4)	75.3 (24.1)	62.8 (17.1)	47.6 (8.7)	34.5 (1.4)	58.7 (14.8)
Daily mean °F (°C)	21.3 (−5.9)	25.5 (−3.6)	37.3 (2.9)	49.4 (9.7)	60.9 (16.1)	70.2 (21.2)	73.5 (23.1)	71.9 (22.2)	64.6 (18.1)	52.4 (11.3)	39.0 (3.9)	27.3 (−2.6)	49.4 (9.7)
Mean daily minimum °F (°C)	13.6 (−10.2)	17.3 (−8.2)	28.3 (−2.1)	38.8 (3.8)	50.7 (10.4)	60.7 (15.9)	64.3 (17.9)	62.4 (16.9)	53.8 (12.1)	42.0 (5.6)	30.5 (−0.8)	20.1 (−6.6)	40.2 (4.6)
Record low °F (°C)	−32 (−36)	−27 (−33)	−13 (−25)	8 (−13)	24 (−4)	34 (1)	43 (6)	37 (3)	22 (−6)	7 (−14)	−8 (−22)	−25 (−32)	−32 (−36)
Average precipitation inches (mm)	1.97 (50)	1.81 (46)	2.63 (67)	3.98 (101)	4.82 (122)	5.59 (142)	4.29 (109)	4.19 (106)	3.69 (94)	2.96 (75)	2.43 (62)	2.17 (55)	40.53 (1,029)
Average snowfall inches (cm)	13.0 (33)	5.7 (14)	4.5 (11)	0.6 (1.5)	0.0 (0.0)	0.0 (0.0)	0.0 (0.0)	0.0 (0.0)	0.0 (0.0)	0.0 (0.0)	1.8 (4.6)	5.6 (14)	31.2 (79)
Average precipitation days (≥ 0.01 in)	7.9	6.6	7.3	9.8	10.8	9.4	8.1	8.2	7.2	7.4	7.1	7.6	97.4
Average snowy days (≥ 0.1 in)	6.0	3.8	1.9	0.4	0.0	0.0	0.0	0.0	0.0	0.0	1.0	4.1	17.2
Source: NOAA

== Demographics ==
Historical population
Census	Pop.	Note	%±
1840	725		—
1850	1,073		48.0%
1860	2,218		106.7%
1870	4,055		82.8%
1880	3,658		−9.8%
1890	5,161		41.1%
1900	7,917		53.4%
1910	7,216		−8.9%
1920	8,191		13.5%
1930	9,908		21.0%
1940	10,671		7.7%
1950	11,523		8.0%
1960	19,565		69.8%
1970	18,147		−7.2%
1980	15,710		−13.4%
1990	15,144		−3.6%
2000	15,941		5.3%
2010	15,733		−1.3%
2020	15,274		−2.9%
U.S. Decennial Census

=== Racial and ethnic composition ===
Dixon city, Illinois – Racial and ethnic composition Note: the US Census treats Hispanic/Latino as an ethnic category. This table excludes Latinos from the racial categories and assigns them to a separate category. Hispanics/Latinos may be of any race.
Race / Ethnicity (NH = Non-Hispanic)	Pop 2000	Pop 2010	Pop 2020	% 2000	% 2010	% 2020
White alone (NH)	13,290	12,698	11,442	83.37%	80.71%	74.91%
Black or African American alone (NH)	1,660	1,583	1,698	10.41%	10.06%	11.12%
Native American or Alaska Native alone (NH)	18	25	13	0.11%	0.16%	0.09%
Asian alone (NH)	130	152	134	0.82%	0.97%	0.88%
Native Hawaiian or Pacific Islander alone (NH)	5	2	3	0.03%	0.01%	0.02%
Other race alone (NH)	9	17	44	0.06%	0.11%	0.29%
Mixed race or Multiracial (NH)	144	205	566	0.90%	1.30%	3.71%
Hispanic or Latino (any race)	685	1,051	1,374	4.30%	6.68%	9.00%
Total	15,941	15,733	15,274	100.00%	100.00%	100.00%

=== 2020 census ===
As of the 2020 census, Dixon had a population of 15,274. The median age was 40.5 years. 19.0% of residents were under the age of 18 and 17.3% of residents were 65 years of age or older. For every 100 females there were 126.7 males, and for every 100 females age 18 and over there were 133.0 males age 18 and over. There were 2,891 families residing in the city, and the population density was 1,870.44 inhabitants per square mile (722.18/km^{2}).

98.7% of residents lived in urban areas, while 1.3% lived in rural areas.

There were 5,781 households in Dixon, of which 27.1% had children under the age of 18 living in them. Of all households, 35.4% were married-couple households, 22.0% were households with a male householder and no spouse or partner present, and 32.9% were households with a female householder and no spouse or partner present. About 37.6% of all households were made up of individuals and 15.6% had someone living alone who was 65 years of age or older.

There were 6,355 housing units at an average density of 778.23 per square mile (300.48/km^{2}), and 9.0% were vacant. The homeowner vacancy rate was 2.8% and the rental vacancy rate was 10.6%.

== Economy ==
Dixon is a regional employment hub and is part of two fast growing distribution and warehousing and food processing districts: one is I-88 West and the other, the I-39 Logistics Corridor. The biggest industries are healthcare and government. Healthcare employs over 1,700, while government jobs approach 1,500. The Dixon Correctional Center employs over 600 workers, as does the Department of Transportation. OSF Saint Katharine Medical Center has nearly 1,000 employees. Dixon has many industries employing thousands of the region's residents. The largest are Raynor Garage Doors, Donaldson Inc., Borg Warner, and Spectrum Brands. Fifteen miles away in Ashton, Crest Foods employs over 600.

== Arts and culture ==
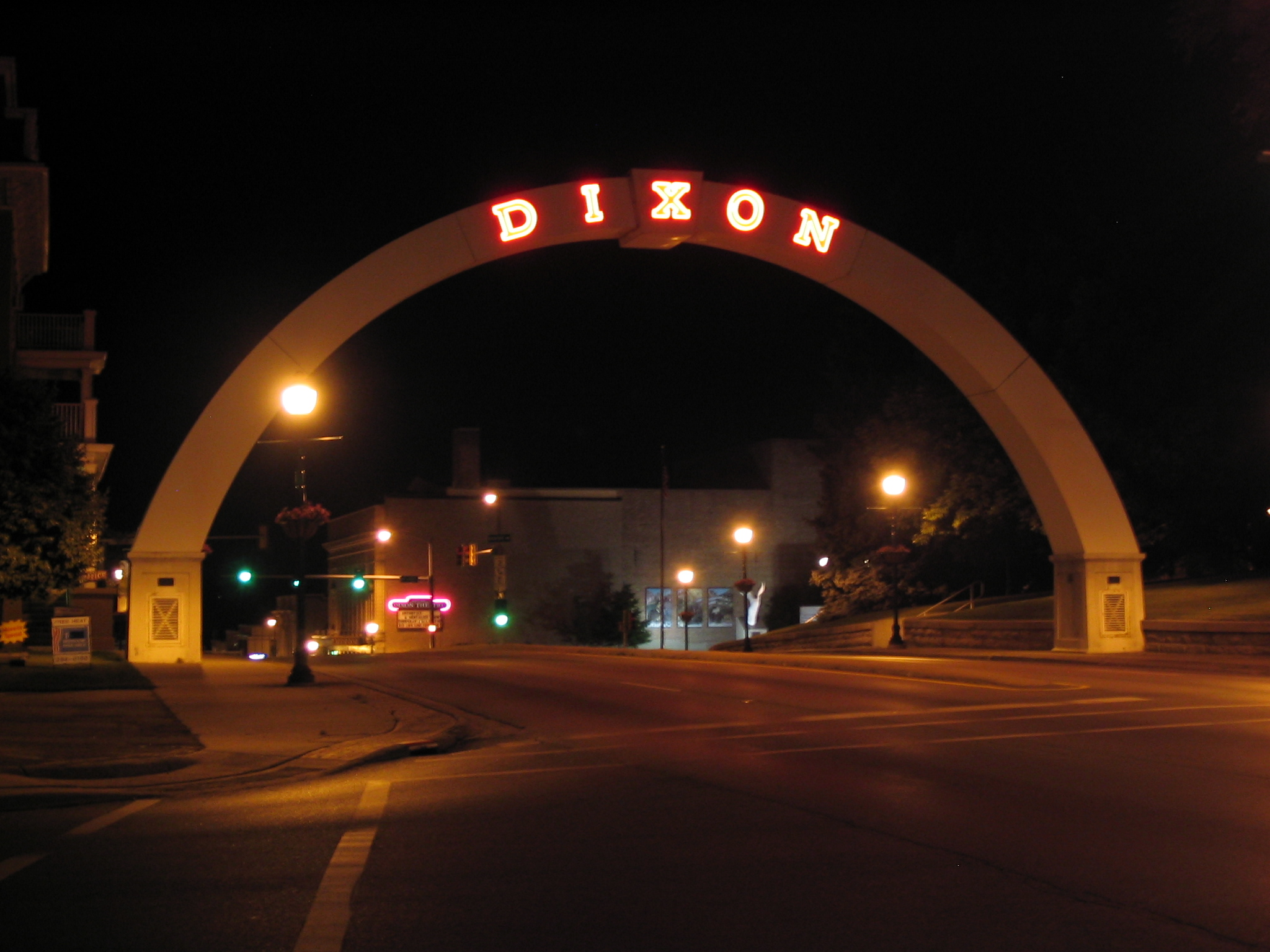
War Memorial Arch, also called the Dixon Memorial Arch

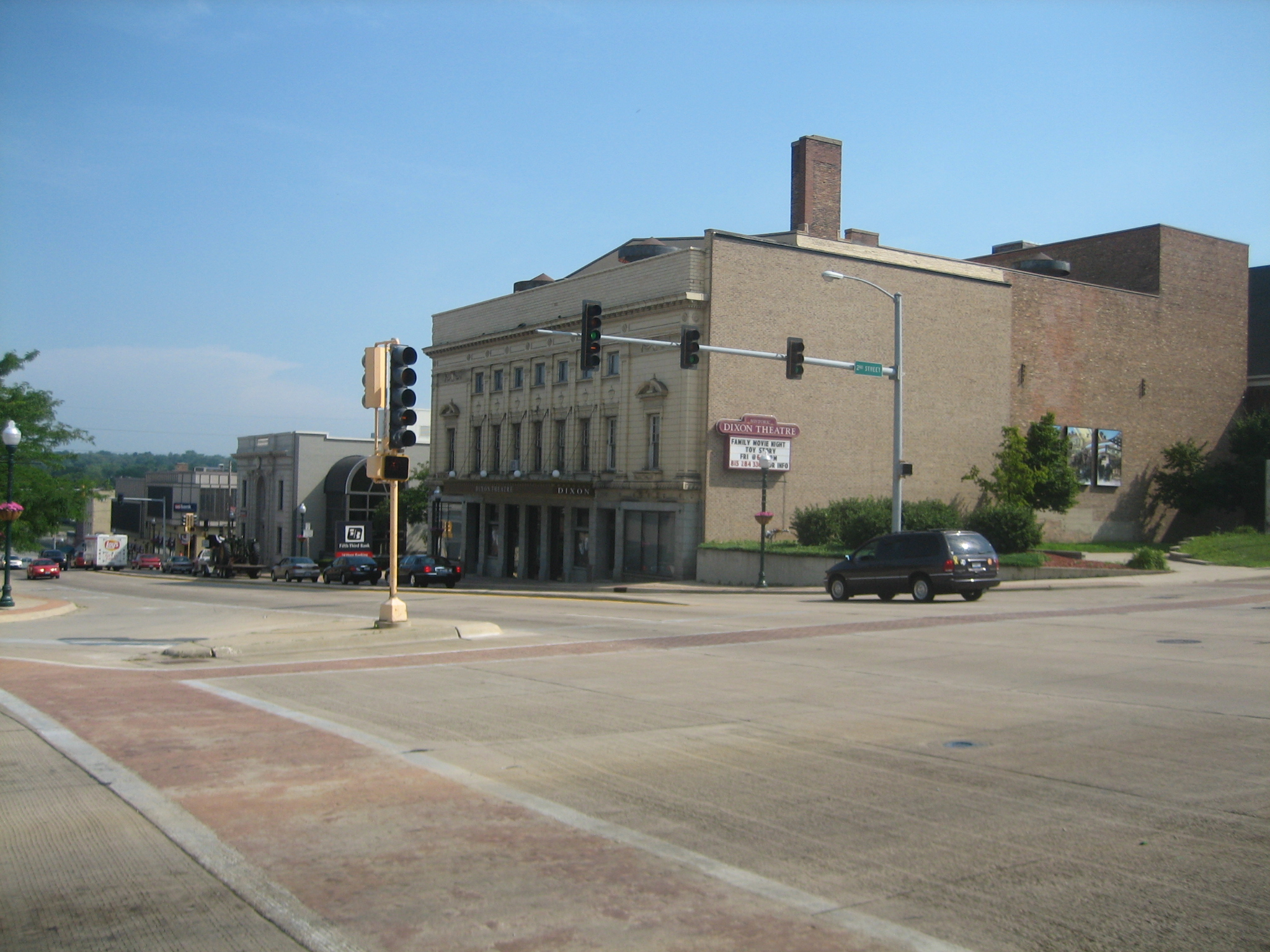
Dixon Theatre

The War Memorial Arch, also referred to as the Dixon Memorial Arch, sits on Galena Avenue atop a hill just south of the Rock River. It features the word "Dixon" in neon glasswork. The arch was originally created in 1919, to honor the veterans of the first World War. It was then rebuilt multiple times: once in 1949 after "deteriorating", again in 1965 to fit the widened Galena Avenue, and one final time on Veteran's Day, 1985, being rebuilt to be made out of fiberglass. The arch has gone on to become a symbol of the town, showing up on the official seal of Dixon and the logo of the government website.

Every summer Dixon holds the annual Petunia Festival featuring a parade, carnival (Farrow shows), country concert, fireworks show, and a 5K race—the Reagan Run. The parade features a multitude of floats from surrounding businesses, politicians, and other area groups. The festival ends with the Fourth of July fireworks.

The Petunia Festival was conceived after Dutch Elm Disease and highway expansion wiped out the trees along the major roads in the late 1950s. In response to the dramatic change the streetscape underwent, the Dixon Men's Garden Club planted petunias along Galena Avenue to regain some sort of streetscape identity once again in the early 1960s. Before this annual festival, volunteers plant thousands of pink petunias along the main streets. The flowers are watered and maintained by the combined efforts of city workers and volunteers.

Dixon is also home to the Dixon Historic Theatre, or simply The Dixon, a theater that hosts live performances, movies, and community events. Formerly an opera house that was destroyed in a fire, the property was bought by Leonard G. Rorer, who converted it into The Dixon, hosting orchestras, vaudeville acts, and silent movies. It would close in 1984 and be sold to its current owners, Dixon Theatre Renovation, Inc. and the Lee County Civic Center Authority, the following year.

The Rock River, which runs through the center of Dixon, is open to many activities such as kayaking, fishing, and boating. At one point, places such as Lowell park even allowed swimming, with Ronald Reagan serving as a lifeguard at the park. However, swimming has since been banned in many parts of the river, including Dixon.

The Downtown district has become a National Historic District due to its historic buildings that reflect the dominant architectural styles of the years they were built in, including the city court house, town hall, and various government buildings and churches in the area.

The Northwest Territory Historic Center is a museum located in the Boyhood School of President Ronald Reagan and affiliated with the Smithsonian Institution. It houses exhibits on the Native American tribes and prairies that once existed in what is now Dixon, as well as exhibits on early American farming and former U.S. presidents Abraham Lincoln and Ronald Regan. It also has many rooms restored and preserved from its time as a school, including a classroom and gym. Alongside this, it also houses the Veterans History Project Regional Center as well as a research library, art gallery, surround-sound theater, and museum store.

== Parks and recreation ==
The Dixon Park District owns more than 1,100 acres (450 ha) of land including two historic parks platted in 1842. The parks range from Lowell Park's 200 acres (81 ha) which is listed on the National Register of Historic Places; rural Meadows Park which encompasses 567 acres (229 ha) of recreational opportunities with natural areas and farm land; to neighborhood parks located throughout the city. Lee County, of which Dixon is the County Seat, offers many recreational areas and campgrounds; over 7,000 campsites are located within 17 miles (27 km) of the city. Tourists from nearby Chicago take advantage of Lee County's recreational opportunities, particularly during summer weekends, adding approximately 20,000 people to the area's population.

Petunia Crossing

A pedestrian path runs along a portion of the route once taken by an Illinois Central Railroad line, on top of the Illinois Central Stone Arch Railroad Bridges and Dixon Railroad Crossing, before crossing the Rock River via a pedestrian bridge (Petunia Crossing) and merging into Page Park. Another path, the Lowell Parkway Trail, follows a different portion of the same former railway route, connecting Dixon to both Meadows Park and Lowell Park.

== Infrastructure ==
=== Healthcare ===
Dixon is a regional center for healthcare. The community has OSF Saint Katharine Medical Center, is a medical student-teaching facility, four adult clinics, a children's clinic, two dialysis centers, two urgent-care clinics, Sinnissippi Mental Health Center and the Northern Illinois Cancer Center. There is also a hospital, an infirmary and a clinic for the mentally ill at the Dixon Correctional Center. The Mabley State Mental Health complex is also located in Dixon.

=== Transportation ===
Dixon is served by Interstate 88, connecting it to the Quad Cities and Chicago, as well as Route 26, connecting it to Peoria.

Dixon was once served by Illinois Central railroad as well as the Chicago and North Western Railway (C&NW), both with their own passenger depot and freight houses. While little remains today, the freight house for C&NW was preserved and now is the site of a furniture store for kitchens and bathrooms. Union Pacific purchased the C&NW line, which today runs through the town and sees regular service. However, it has no stops for either freight or passenger trains in Dixon. The Illinois Central line, on the other hand, was almost entirely removed and the route it took now serves as the path for various trails.

For a short time, from 1904 to 1925, an electric tram ran between Dixon and the nearby town of Sterling. However, it was torn down after its closure, with its rails being reused for the structure of the nearby Walgreen Field airport, and no other physical remnants exist today.

Today, the only major mass transit that exists connecting Dixon to local cities is the Regan Mass Transit service.

Dixon is served by the Charles R. Walgreen Field, a general aviation-only airport.

== Education ==
The school district is Dixon Unit School District 170. The district's high school is Dixon High School.

Sauk Valley Community College is the area community college.

== Notable people ==
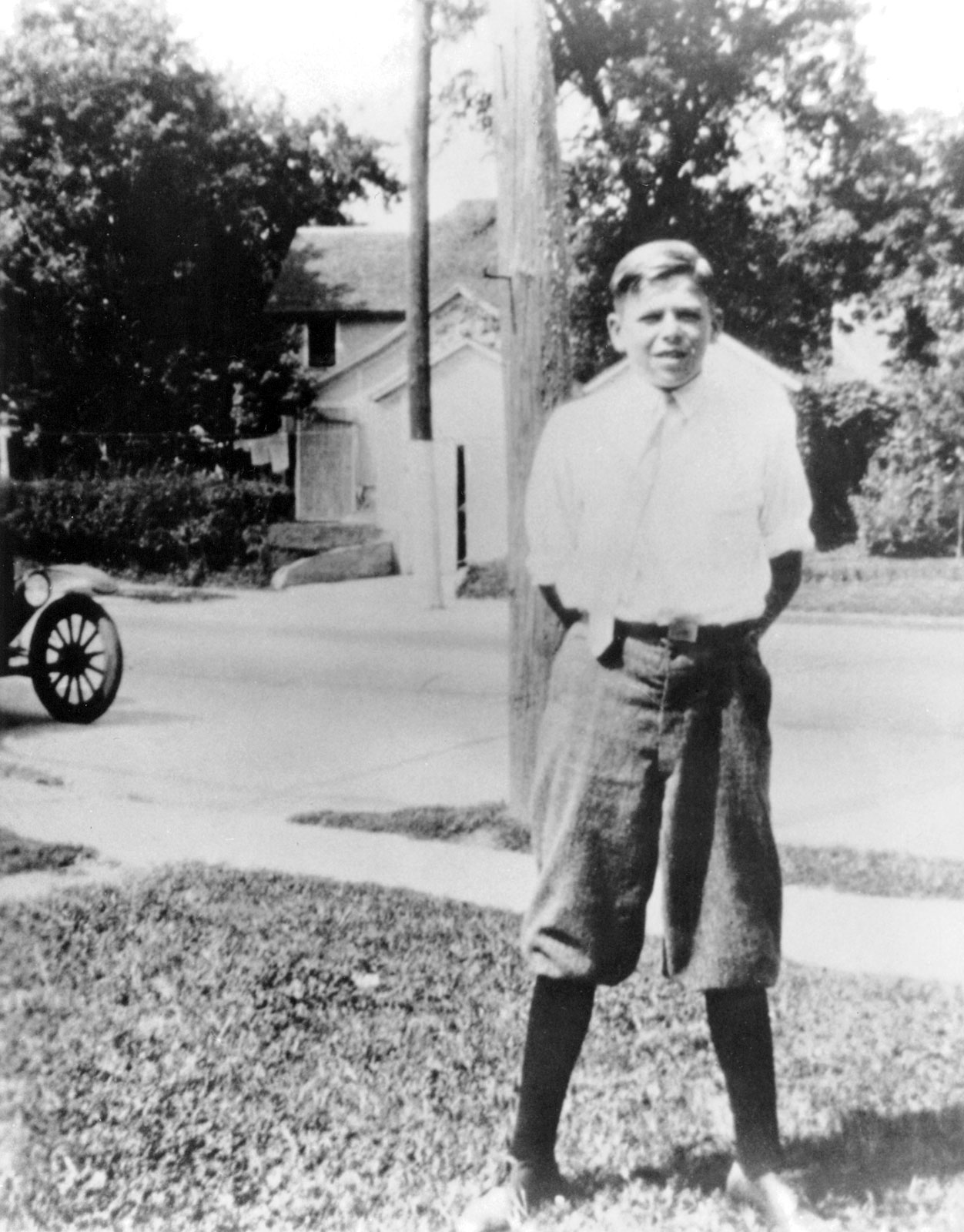
Ronald Reagan in Dixon, 1922

- Noah Brooks: journalist and biographer of Abraham Lincoln
- William Conger: painter and educator
- Hubert D. Considine: Illinois state representative and businessman
- Rita Crundwell: Dixon comptroller and embezzler
- John Dement: 19th century politician and military commander
- John Deere: industrialist, invented steel plow
- John Devine: professional bicycle racer
- John P. Devine: Speaker of the Illinois House of Representatives
- Sherwood Dixon: politician, 36th Lieutenant Governor of Illinois
- James K. Edsall: politician, Illinois Attorney General
- Samuel Cook Edsall: Episcopal Bishop of Minnesota
- Daniel G. Garnsey: United States Congressman
- Harriet E. Garrison (1848–1930), physician, writer
- Charna Halpern: Comedian and co-founder of iO Theater with Del Close
- Jerry Hey: five-time Grammy winner
- David Klamen: artist and academic
- Jeanie Linders: writer and producer of Menopause: The Musical
- William H. McMaster: South Dakota politician, later banker in Dixon
- Ward T. Miller: professional baseball player for various teams
- Julia Swift Orvis, history professor at Wellesley College
- George Ham Page: co-founder of the Anglo-Swiss Condensed Milk Company
- Louella Parsons newspaper columnist; grew up in Dixon
- Ronald Reagan: 40th president of the United States; grew up in Dixon
- Rondi Reed: Tony Award-winning actress and singer
- Isaiah Roby: NBA Oklahoma City Thunder
- Fred E. Sterling: politician
- Charles Rudolph Walgreen: founder of drugstore chain
- Minnie Gow Walsworth, poet
- Larry Young: MLB umpire

== Sister cities ==
Dixon has four sister cities.

- Dikson, Russia
- Herzberg, Germany
- Castlebar, Ireland
- Thika, Kenya

== See also ==
- Illinois Central Stone Arch Railroad Bridges
- Nachusa House
- William H. Van Epps House
- Lincoln Highway
- Ronald Reagan Trail
- Nachusa Grasslands
