= Reagan (2024 film) =

2024 American biographical film by Sean McNamara

- Theatrical release poster
- Directed by: Sean McNamara
- Screenplay by: Howard Klausner
- Based on: The Crusader by Paul Kengor
- Produced by: Mark Joseph
- Starring: Dennis Quaid; Penelope Ann Miller; Jon Voight; Kevin Dillon; David Henrie; Mena Suvari
- Cinematography: Christian Sebaldt
- Edited by: Clayton Woodhull; Jeff W. Canavan
- Music by: John Coda
- Production companies: Rawhide Pictures; MJM Entertainment Group; Makeshift Productions
- Distributed by: ShowBiz Direct
- Release date: August 30, 2024
- Running time: 141 minutes
- Country: United States
- Language: English
- Budget: $25 million
- Box office: $30.1 million

Reagan is a 2024 American biographical drama film directed by Sean McNamara and written by Howard Klausner, based on Paul Kengor's 2006 book The Crusader: Ronald Reagan and the Fall of Communism. The film stars Dennis Quaid as President Ronald Reagan, alongside Penelope Ann Miller, Jon Voight, Kevin Dillon, David Henrie, and Mena Suvari.

Filming began on September 9, 2020, and included locations such as Guthrie, Oklahoma. Theatrically released in the United States on August 30, 2024, Reagan was panned by critics, grossed $30.1 million worldwide against its budget of $25 million, and, at the 45th Golden Raspberry Awards, was nominated for six Razzie Awards including Worst Picture, Worst Actor for Dennis Quaid, Worst Supporting Actress for Lesley-Anne Down and earning Jon Voight the Worst Supporting Actor award. Despite this, audiences reviewed the film more favorably.

== Plot ==
Moscow, today, Russian politician Andrei Novikov arrives at the home of former KGB agent Viktor Petrovich, and questions why the Soviet Union fell. Petrovich, who was assigned to surveil U.S. politician Ronald Reagan, discusses the Soviet Union's past ambitions to infiltrate Washington, D.C. and Hollywood. Petrovich details Reagan's childhood in 1920s Illinois, where his father Jack was an alcoholic but his mother Nelle instilled Reagan with Christian values.

Reagan becomes a born-again Christian, and works as a lifeguard and radio announcer. He later moves to Hollywood, where he becomes an actor for Warner Bros. After World War II, Reagan's status as a leading man is in decline, though he is elected president of the Screen Actors Guild in 1947. During the Hollywood blacklist era, Reagan becomes an FBI informant and feuds with Herbert Sorrell, a union organizer. Reagan's marriage to actress Jane Wyman ends in divorce due to his political involvement and the premature death of their daughter Christine.

In 1949, Reagan meets actress Nancy Davis, and the two marry in 1952. In 1964, Reagan campaigns for Republican presidential nominee Barry Goldwater, and delivers his "A Time for Choosing" speech. Goldwater ultimately loses the 1964 election in a landslide to incumbent president Lyndon B. Johnson. Reagan discusses his political future, and decides to run for governor of California in 1966. In 1969, Governor Reagan clashes with students at the University of California, Berkeley, and has the state National Guard sent in to quell the protests.

In 1970, the Reagans hold prayers with Pat Boone and pastor George K. Otis, who prophesies Reagan will become president if he "walks uprightly" before God. Six years later, Reagan challenges incumbent President Gerald Ford for the Republican nomination at the Republican National Convention but narrowly loses in the delegate count. Ford narrowly loses the election to Democrat Jimmy Carter, and Reagan runs again for president in 1980. He beats Carter in a landslide and forms a friendship with Tip O'Neill, the Democratic Speaker of the House.

In 1981, after delivering a speech at the Washington Hilton, Reagan is shot and wounded but survives. Upon returning to the White House, Reagan clashes with David Stockman, the White House budget director, over his tax cut proposal. When Reagan learns that air traffic controllers are on strike, he fires the air traffic controllers who do not return to work within 48 hours.

Reagan selects George Shultz as his Secretary of State to handle diplomacy with the Soviet Union. Despite this, in 1983, Reagan labels the Soviet Union as an evil empire. Tensions between the U.S. and the Soviet Union escalate when Soviet interceptor planes shoot down a commercial passenger plane. Meanwhile, there are nationwide protests against Reagan's handling of the AIDS crisis, though Reagan still wins reelection in 1984 over Walter Mondale in a landslide.

By the time of Reagan's second term, Leonid Brezhnev's successors had died in office, making diplomacy difficult. Reagan meets with UK Prime Minister Margaret Thatcher, who persuades him to meet with Soviet leader Mikhail Gorbachev. At the Geneva Summit in 1985, the two leaders negotiate nuclear disarmament, but Reagan is reluctant to sign an agreement due to his support for the Strategic Defense Initiative (SDI). A year later, the Iran-Contra scandal breaks, and Reagan is threatened with impeachment. Reagan denies there were arms traded for hostages, but backtracks in an Oval Office speech.

Despite Shultz's opposition, Reagan delivers a speech near the Brandenburg Gate, and demands for Gorbachev to tear down the Berlin Wall. In 1989, Reagan leaves office and the Berlin Wall falls shortly thereafter; the Soviet Union dissolves two years later after he leaves office. In retirement, Reagan experiences memory lapses and in 1994, discloses he has been diagnosed with Alzheimer's disease. Reagan dies in 2004, and international leaders attend his funeral to pay their respects.

== Cast ==
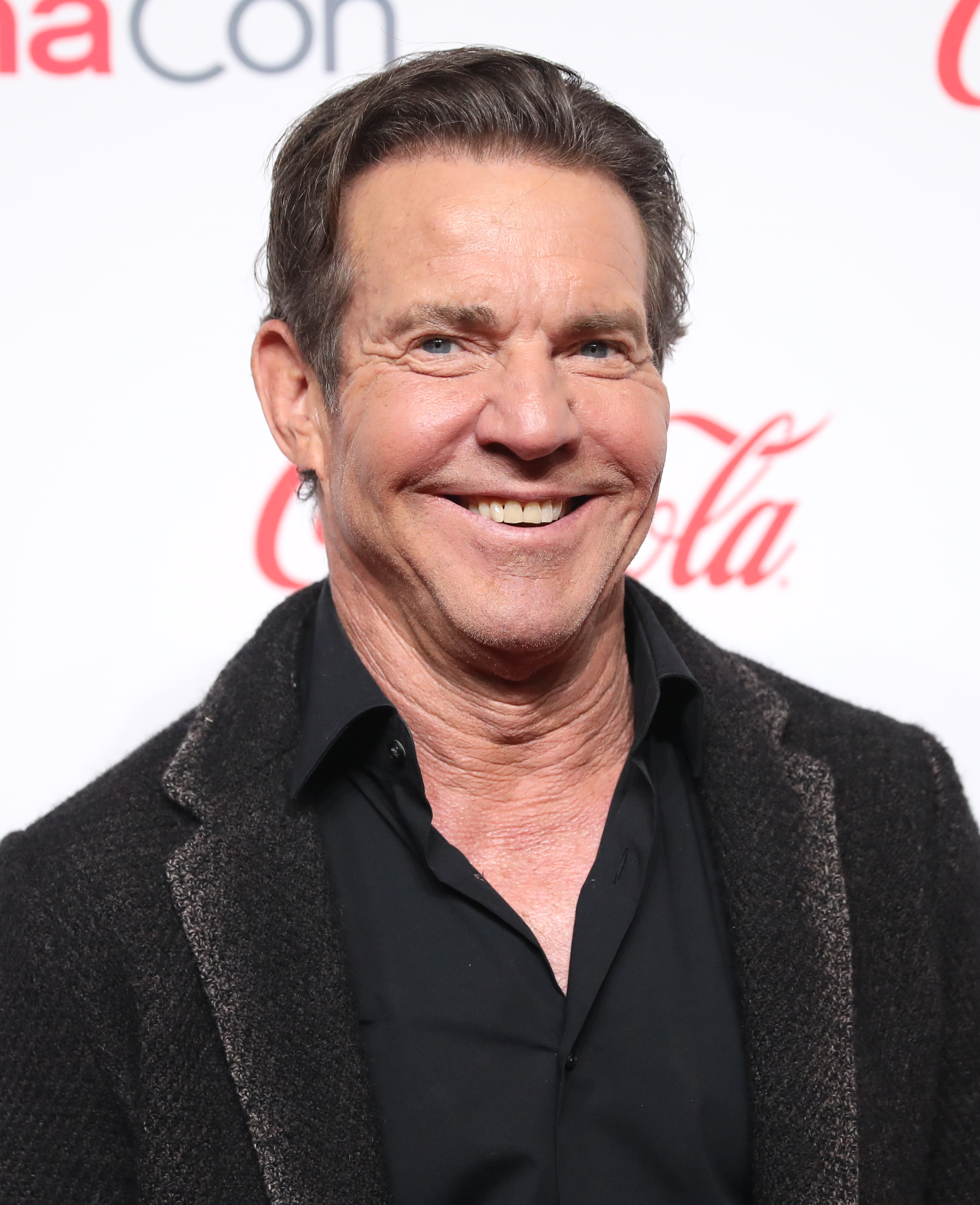
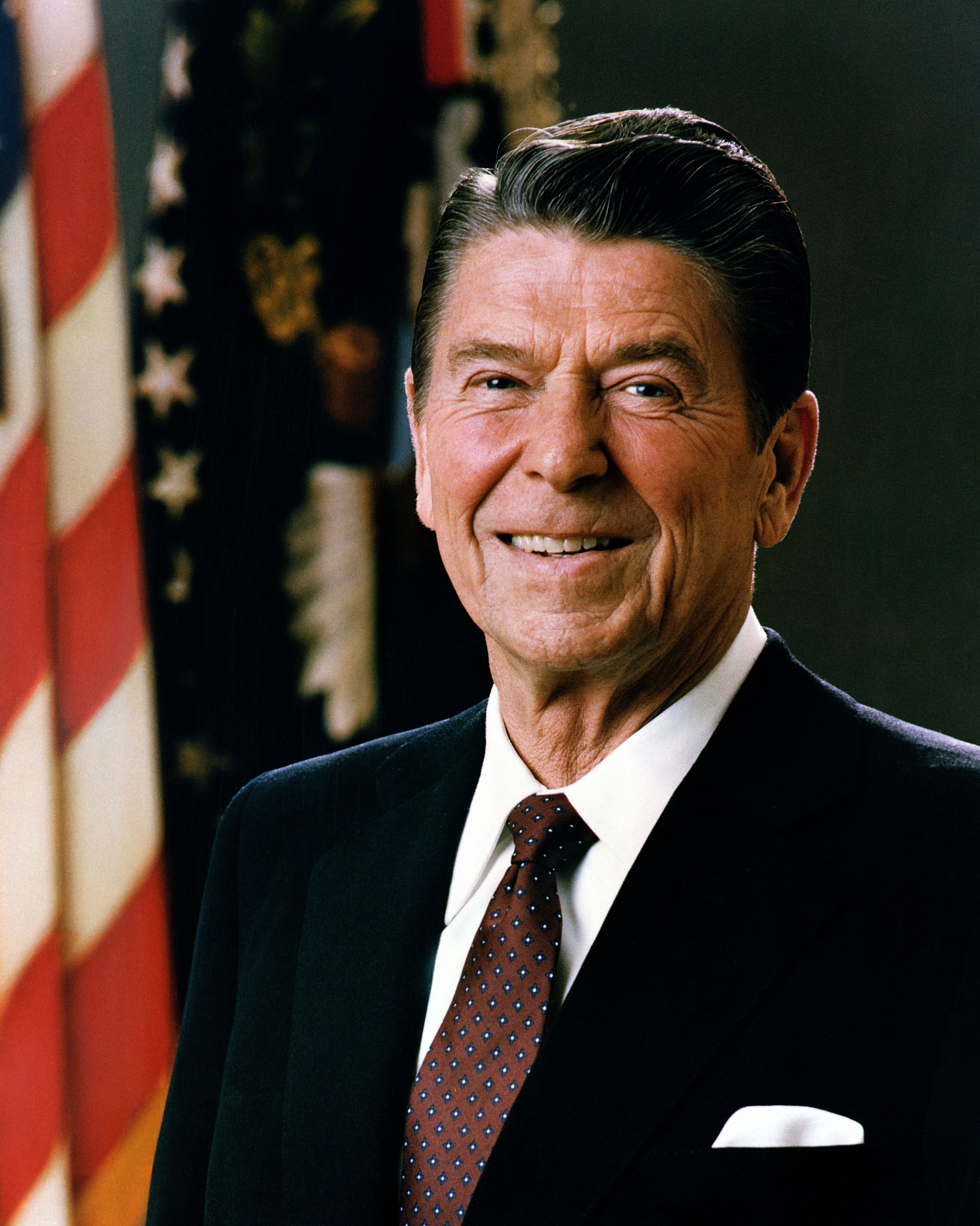
Dennis Quaid (left) plays President Ronald Reagan.
- Dennis Quaid as Ronald Reagan
  - Tommy Ragen as Dutch Reagan
  - David Henrie as young Ronald Reagan
- Penelope Ann Miller as Nancy Reagan
- Jon Voight as Viktor Petrovich
- Mena Suvari as Jane Wyman
- Kevin Dillon as Jack Warner
- Mark Moses as William "Judge" Clark
- Trevor Donovan as John Barletta
- Olek Krupa as Mikhail Gorbachev
- Alex Sparrow as Andrei Novikov
- Robert Davi as Leonid Brezhnev
- Amanda Righetti as Nelle Reagan
- Jennifer O'Neill as older Nelle Reagan
- Justin Chatwin as Jack Reagan
- Dan Lauria as Tip O'Neill
- Lesley-Anne Down as Margaret Thatcher
- Will Wallace as Edwin Meese
- Xander Berkeley as George Shultz
- C. Thomas Howell as Caspar Weinberger
- Derek Richardson as Dana Rohrabacher
- Elya Baskin as B.E. Kertchman
- Kevin Sorbo as Reverend Ben Cleaver
- Nick Searcy as James Baker
- Pat Boone as George Otis
- Darryl Cox as William Casey
- Darci Lynne Farmer as drowning girl
- Stephen Guarino as Mike Deaver
- Sean Hankinson as Dalton Trumbo
- Eloisa Huggins as Patti Davis
- James Austin Kerr as Sterling Hayden
- Hideo Kimura as Yasuhiro Nakasone
- Jordan Matlock as William Holden
- Moriah Peters as Loyce Whiteman
- Skip Schwink as Jimmy Carter
- Scott Stapp as Frank Sinatra
- Ryan Whitney as Margaret "Mugs" Cleaver
- Chris Massoglia as Pat Boone (uncredited)

== Production ==
In 2010, it was announced producer Mark Joseph would be producing a feature film biopic of Ronald Reagan with Joseph having been inspired to take on such a project after reacting to the miniseries The Reagans with distaste. Screenwriter Jonas McCord had initially been uninterested in the project, but changed his mind after deciding that Reagan's childhood and formative years were dramatically rich. Klausner and McCord wrote the script based on a book by Paul Kengor: The Crusader: Ronald Reagan and the Fall of Communism. Kengor described the script's development as faithful to both his books and history.

In 2012, Jon Voight was in discussions to portray Viktor Petrovich, whom Kengor said "is actually a character based on a number of KGB agents and Soviet analysts who we now know were tasked with keeping tabs on Ronald Reagan for many years".

In August 2016, it was reported Sean McNamara, who had, at 18, worked as a sound engineer on the filming of Reagan's inauguration ceremony in 1981, had signed on to direct. John G. Avildsen had been in negotiations to direct prior to his death. Penelope Ann Miller, who played Nancy Reagan in the film, described Reagan as being a Rocky like love story where the primary focus would be on the romance between Ronald and Nancy.

Joseph had trouble securing financing for the film with several deals made before production actually started, only for the money to never actually come through. This led to Joseph turning to outside independent financing which made up the film's $25 million budget.

Principal photography began on September 9, 2020. Filming locations included Guthrie, Oklahoma. It was announced on October 22, 2020, that filming had shut down after several crew members tested positive for COVID-19 in the midst of the ongoing pandemic. Filming resumed on November 5, 2020.

== Music ==
The film features prominent musicians' covers of standards. Bob Dylan sings Cole Porter's "Don't Fence Me In" over the end credits. Gene Simmons covers the 1930s standard "Stormy Weather". Clint Black sings John Denver's "Take Me Home, Country Roads." The original score was composed by John Coda.

== Release ==
Reagan was originally due to be released in 2021 but was then delayed to an unspecified date. In March 2024, it was announced ShowBiz Direct would theatrically distribute the film on August 30, 2024.

Facebook temporarily restricted the film from advertising on its platform, alleging that the ads were efforts to influence the 2024 United States elections. In March 2025, it was announced that Universal Pictures Content Group had acquired most international rights to the film from Voltage Pictures excluding countries such as Spain, Portugal, Lithuania, Croatia, Estonia, Latvia and Poland where it had been theatrically released prior, with plans for a digital-only release.

Reagan is set to be re-released in a dozen American cities in 2026 beginning on Independence Day weekend as part of the America250 celebrations, featuring ten minutes of unreleased footage. It will later expand to 600 theaters in September.

== Reception ==
=== Box office ===
Reagan grossed $30.1 million worldwide.

In the United States and Canada, Reagan was released alongside AfrAId, Slingshot, 1992, and City of Dreams, and was projected to gross $5–7 million from 2,754 theaters in its four-day opening weekend. It grossed $2.6 million on its first day, including $525,000 from Thursday night previews. The film earned $7.7 million during its opening three day weekend, and $10.3 million over the four day Labor Day Weekend. The theater with the highest grosses for the film on opening weekend was located in Edmond, Oklahoma, nearby where the film was in-part shot.

=== Critical response ===
On the review aggregator website Rotten Tomatoes, 17% of 69 critics' reviews are positive, with an average rating of 4/10. The website's consensus reads: "While Reagan the movie undoubtedly admires Reagan the man, its cloying and glossy rendering of history flattens the 40th U.S. President into caricature." The audience score was much more favorable at 98%, giving the film one of the largest audience-to-critic score gaps in the site's history. Metacritic, which uses a weighted average, assigned the film a score of 22 out of 100, based on 20 critics, indicating "generally unfavorable" reviews. Audiences polled by CinemaScore gave the film an average grade of "A" on an A+ to F scale, while those surveyed by PostTrak gave it an average 4.5 out of 5 stars, with 77% saying they would definitely recommend it.

Bilge Ebiri of Vulture said the film was "pure hagiography, but it's not even one of those convincing hagiographies that pummel you into submission with compelling scenes that reinforce their subject's greatness." Writing in The Wall Street Journal, Kyle Smith said, "Mannered acting, dismal cinematography, clunky attempts to enhance excitement via gimmicks such as slow motion, and a musical score like a fountain of goo all serve as flashbacks to Reagan-era network schlock." Nick Schager of The Daily Beast wrote, "Regardless of how you feel about Ronald Reagan the president, most will be united in finding this biopic a preachy, plodding, graceless groaner."

The Washington Post's Ty Burr gave the film 1.5/4 stars, writing, "The faithful for whom Reagan was made aren't likely to see that it's a hagiography as rosy and shallow as anything in a Kremlin May Day parade. As pop-culture propaganda — popaganda, if you will — the movie's strictly for true believers. As history, it's worthless." Glenn Kenny of The New York Times deemed the film an "unabashed love letter to the former president", concluding, "It all makes for a plodding film, more curious than compelling."

Bill Newcott of The Saturday Evening Post gave the film 3/5 stars, calling it "A shamelessly adoring biopic that is single-handedly rescued from worshipful ignominy by its star, Dennis Quaid, who stubbornly chips through the script's plaster façade to offer glimpses of a man who spent his entire career concealing his complexities."

In December 2024, Owen Gleiberman of Variety placed the film in his "Top Worst Movies of 2024" list at #3, writing "it’s like watching an infomercial for an aw-shucks cult leader."

=== Accolades ===
Award	Date of ceremony	Category	Recipient(s)	Result	Ref.
Family Film and TV Awards	November 9, 2024	Outstanding Performance In A Historical Drama (Special Award)	Penelope Ann Miller	Won	
Golden Raspberry Awards	February 28, 2025	Worst Picture	Mark Joseph	Nominated	
Golden Raspberry Awards	February 28, 2025	Worst Actor	Dennis Quaid	Nominated	
Golden Raspberry Awards	February 28, 2025	Worst Supporting Actor	Jon Voight (Note: Also for Megalopolis, Shadow Land, and Strangers)	Won	
Golden Raspberry Awards	February 28, 2025	Worst Supporting Actress	Lesley-Anne Down	Nominated	
Golden Raspberry Awards	February 28, 2025	Worst Screenplay	Howard Klausner	Nominated	
Golden Raspberry Awards	February 28, 2025	Worst Screen Combo	Dennis Quaid and Penelope Ann Miller	Nominated	
Movieguide Awards	March 6, 2025	Faith and Freedom Award for Movies	Reagan	Won	
GMA Dove Awards	October 7, 2025	Feature Film of the Year	Reagan	Nominated	
Will Rogers Medallion Award	November 1, 2025	Western Film - Drama Feature	Reagan	Won	

== See also ==
- Cultural depictions of Ronald Reagan
