= Ronald Reagan Trail =

Collection of highways in Illinois, United States

Points of interest on the Ronald Reagan Trail

The Ronald Reagan Trail is a collection of highways in central Illinois that connect villages and cities that were of importance to former United States President Ronald Reagan. The trail was established on May 21, 1999, by the Illinois General Assembly, five years prior to former President Reagan's death in June 2004. The trail was dedicated in a ceremony on August 25, 2000 with a motorcade marking the first trip. The Reagan Trail was the brainchild of the late mayor of Eureka, Illinois Joe Serangeli. A volunteer-run Reagan Trail Association maintained a web presence and promoted the trail for its initial years, but the board was dissolved in July 2016 and website transferred to the care of the Ronald W. Reagan Society of Eureka College.

== Destinations ==
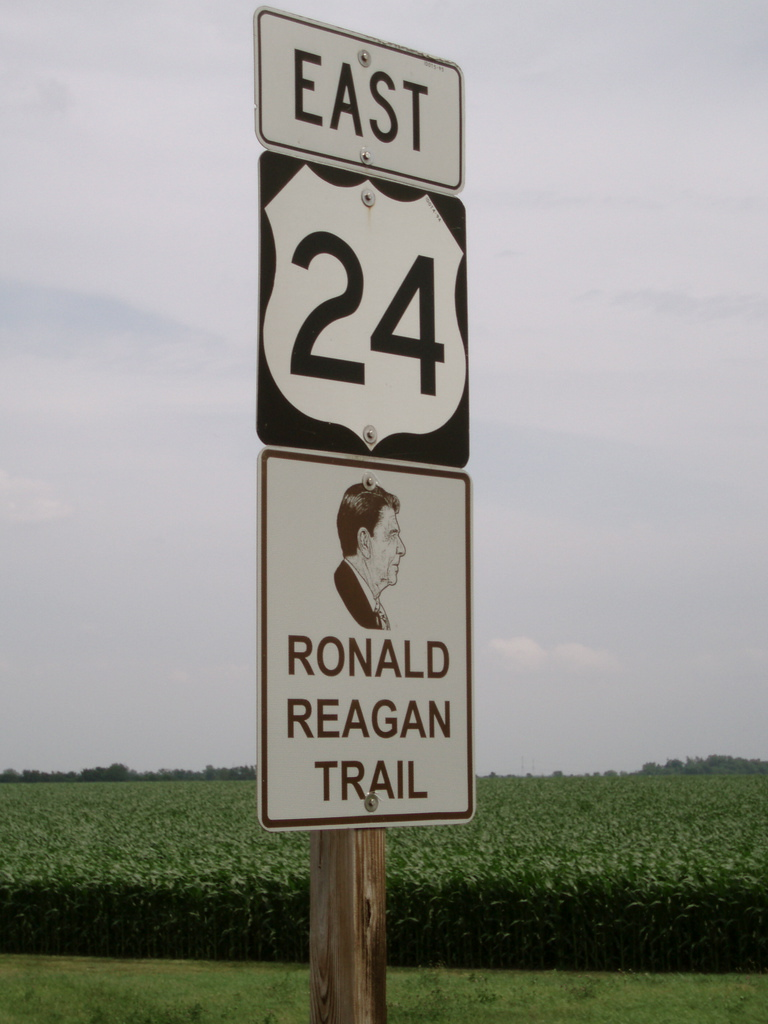
Ronald Reagan Trail

The trail is over 100 mi (160 km) and takes approximately 2 hours by car. It is marked by brown-and white signs with Reagan's profile. The trail takes on the general shape of a triangle, and can be summarized into the following segments:

=== Monmouth to Eureka ===
The southwest segment of the trail follows U.S. Route 34 from Monmouth, Illinois to Interstate 74 east to Galesburg, Illinois. It then follows I-74 east to Peoria, Illinois, and U.S. Route 24 east to Washington, Illinois and Eureka, Illinois. This segment has the following attractions:

- Monmouth — Reagan lived in Monmouth from 1918 to 1919. There is also a separate exhibit in the city.
- Galesburg — Reagan attended the first grade in Galesburg. Reagan lived in Galesburg c. 1915–1916.
- Washington — A frequent stop of Reagan when traveling to and from Eureka College.
- Eureka — Reagan went to college at Eureka College, located in the town of Eureka.

=== Peoria to Tampico/Dixon ===
The east segment of the trail starts at U.S. Route 24 in Peoria and follows Illinois Route 29 north to Bureau Junction, Illinois. It then follows Illinois Route 26 to Ohio, Illinois where it branches to Tampico, Illinois on Illinois Route 92 and Dixon, Illinois on Illinois 26. This segment has the following attractions:

- Peoria — Reagan stopped in Peoria for sporting events, including a 1930 football game Eureka College v. Bradley University.
- Peoria Heights — Contains two visitor's sites not related to Ronald Reagan.
- Chillicothe — Home of one of Reagan's close friends, George Taylor.
- Henry — Home of the trail's national headquarters and Visitor Center.
- Princeton — An antiquing destination and frequent Underground Railroad stop.
- Walnut — Home of three of Reagan's close college friends, Elvin "Pud" Fordham, Eddie Wilson, and Jeff Livey.
- Ohio — Another frequent stop of Reagan when traveling to and from college.
- Tampico — Birthplace of Ronald Reagan, Tampico Main Street Historic District, and the H.C. Pitney Variety Store.
- Dixon — Boyhood home of Ronald Reagan after age 9. The Dixon Historic Center, First Christian Church, Lowell Park, and the Wings of Peace and Freedom Park are all in Dixon.
- Fulton — Officially added to the trail in 2009, Fulton was home to Reagan's maternal grandparents and paternal grandparents, as well as other extended relatives.

=== Princeton to Galesburg ===
U.S. Route 34 merely connects Galesburg to Princeton to complete the trail.

== See also ==
- Ronald Reagan Memorial Highway
