= Ronald Reagan Boyhood Home =

Historic house in Illinois, United States

- U.S. National Register of Historic Places
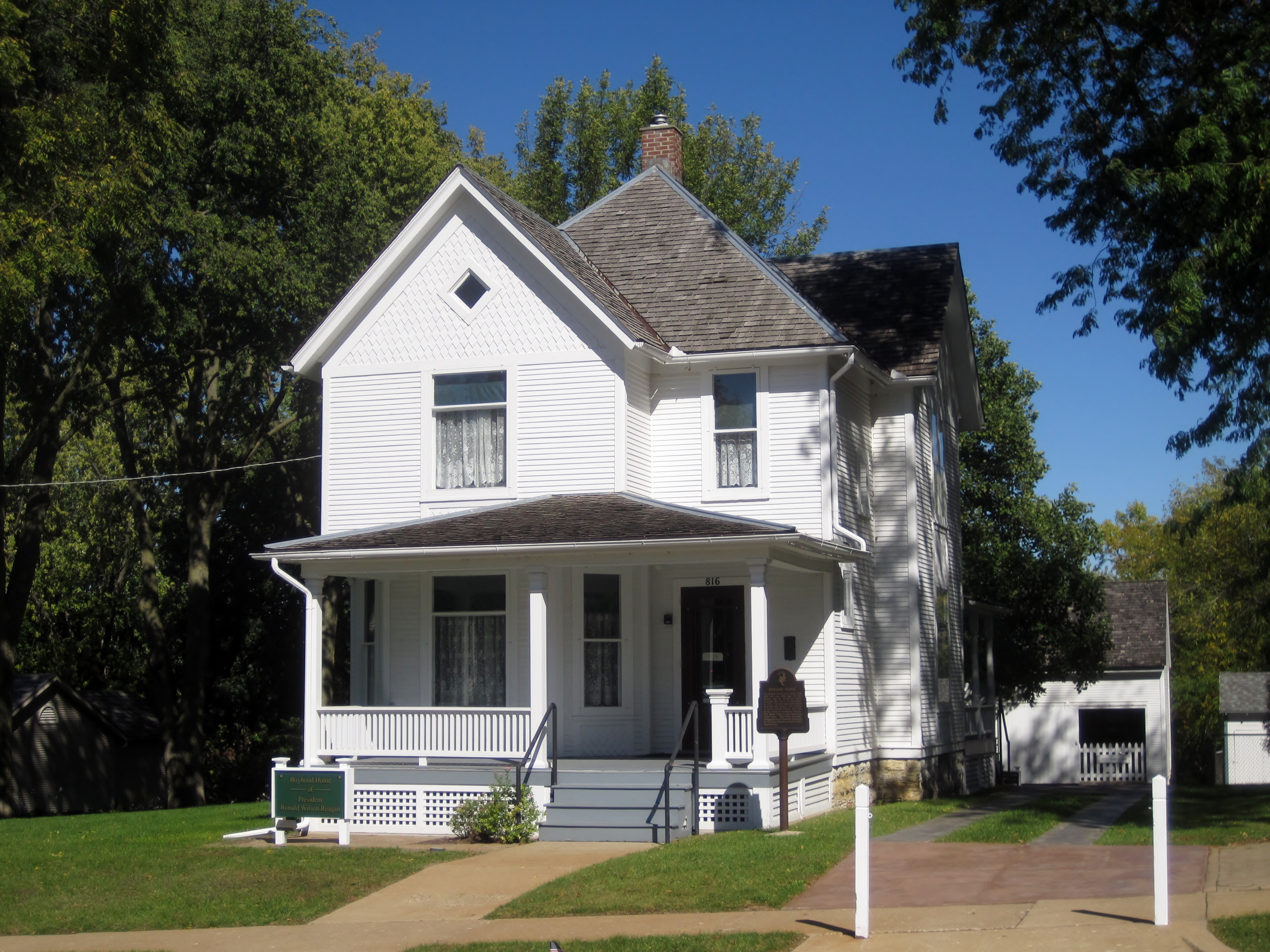

- Location within Illinois Location within the United States
- Interactive map showing the location of Ronald Reagan Boyhood Home
- Location: 816 S. Hennepin Ave., Dixon, Illinois
- Coordinates: 41°50′10″N 89°28′50.6″W
- Area: less than one acre
- Built: 1891
- Architectural style: Queen Anne
- NRHP reference No.: 82002580
- Added to NRHP: March 26, 1982

The Ronald Reagan Boyhood Home is the house located at 816 S. Hennepin Ave., Dixon, Illinois, in which the 40th President of the United States Ronald Reagan lived as a youth beginning in 1920. The building was listed on the National Register of Historic Places in 1982. The home is open to visitors from April to October.

== History ==
=== General ===
The Ronald Reagan Boyhood Home was constructed in Dixon, Illinois, in 1891; its design is fairly typical of American houses during the time period. The house's original owners were William C. and Susan Thompson; it was eventually sold, in 1917. The home's most significant period was between 1920 and 1923 and between 1975 and 1977 when it changed hands twice. In August 1980 a group of local residents, led by Lynn Knights of Dixon, Illinois, purchased the home. The group was then known as the Reagan Home Preservation and Restoration Committee.

=== National Historic Site designation ===
The home is open to the public and operated by Young America's Foundation.

On February 6, 2002, (Public Law 107-137), the United States Secretary of the Interior was authorized to purchase the property from the foundation and establish a U.S. National Historic Site under the jurisdiction of the National Park Service (NPS). The law specifies that the site will not be designated as the Ronald Reagan Boyhood Home National Historic Site until after the Department of the Interior acquires the property.

The Ronald Reagan Boyhood Home Foundation made a point of pride in receiving no funding from the state or federal government, in keeping with Reagan's motto that "government is not the solution to our problem. Government is the problem." However, visits dwindled to 5,000 per year by 2019, and the house increasingly fell into disrepair. In 2018, the foundation's perilous finances forced it to offer to sell the home to the National Park Service, which manages 16 other presidential homes. However, in December 2020, the preservation foundation gifted the home to Young America's Foundation to protect the property, just as YAF has preserved and protected Reagan's Rancho del Cielo in Santa Barbara, California.

== Architecture and design ==
The 1891 house is cast in the popular Queen Anne style. The two-storey house rests on a stone foundation and is topped with a gable roof which was originally covered with cedar shingles.

== Historic significance ==
=== National Register significance ===
The Reagan Boyhood Home is most significant as the home of 40th U.S. President Ronald Reagan and his family from late 1920 until 1923. Reagan was nine years old at the time and in grade school. Though the family moved from the house they remained in Dixon throughout the former president's formative years. For its association with Reagan and significance in the area of politics and government the building was listed on the National Register of Historic Places on March 26, 1982.

=== Reagan at the house ===
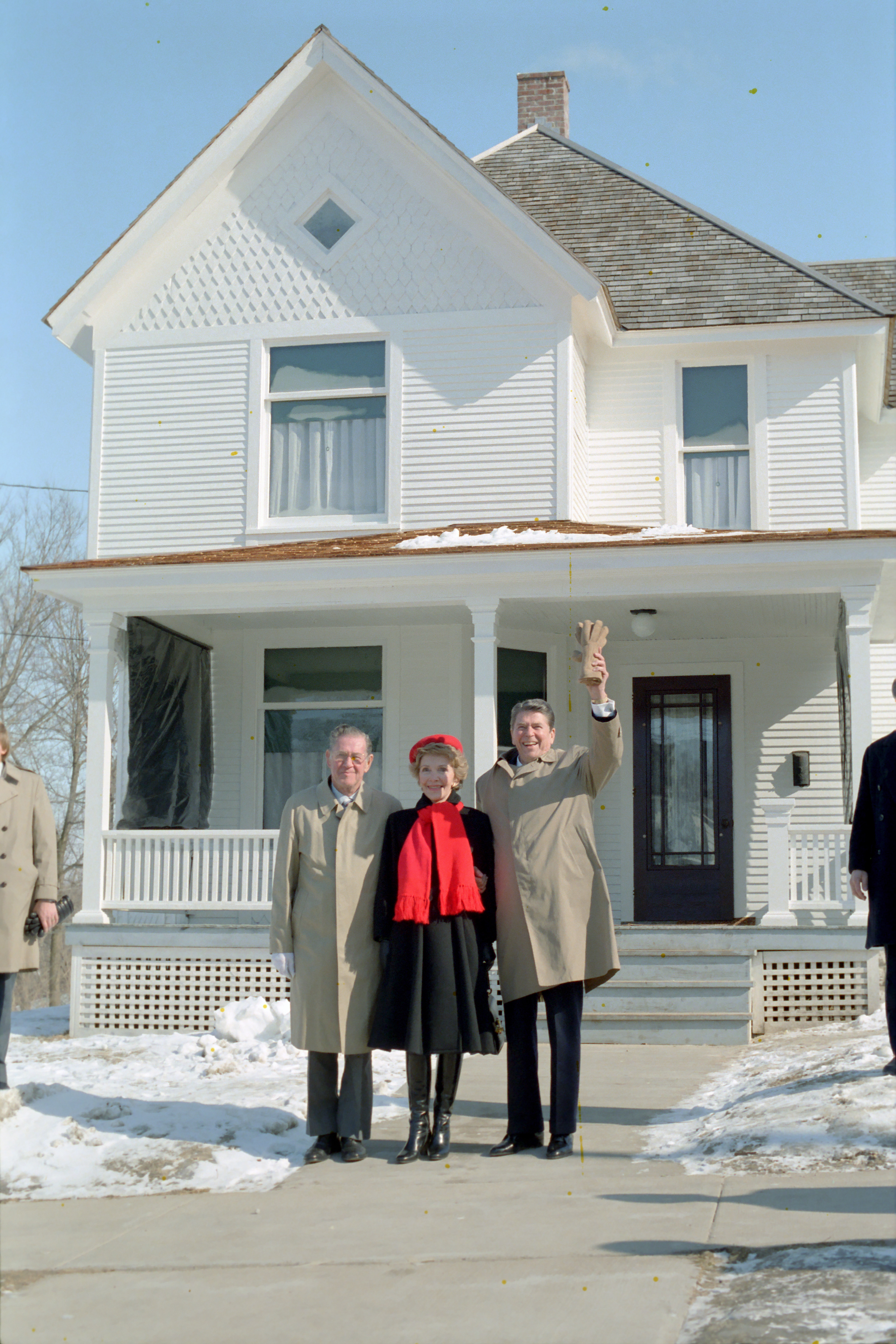
Ronald, Nancy, and Neil Reagan outside the Ronald Reagan Boyhood Home, 1984

According to the National Register of Historic Places documentation, Ronald Reagan stated that the house was associated with important events of his childhood. However, his brother Neil was quoted as saying that the house designated the Boyhood Home is the "wrong one for Ronald's principal memories of the town (Dixon)." One author, James E. Combs, called Dixon's claim that the "Boyhood Home" is the actual boyhood home of Ronald Reagan a bit bogus considering the Reagans moved often and only lived in the house for about two years.

While they lived in the home the Reagan brothers shared a second-floor bedroom, despite the house having three bedrooms. Ronald's mother used the third as a work room. The lone outbuilding on the property was used by the brothers for such activities as raising rabbits. In the house's side yard Ronald and his brother would participate in pick-up football games.

== See also ==
- Birthplace of Ronald Reagan
- H. C. Pitney Variety Store Building
- List of residences of presidents of the United States
- Tampico Main Street Historic District
- Ronald Reagan Trail
