= Birthplace of Ronald Reagan =

U.S. historic place in Tampico, Illinois

- U.S. Historic district – Contributing property
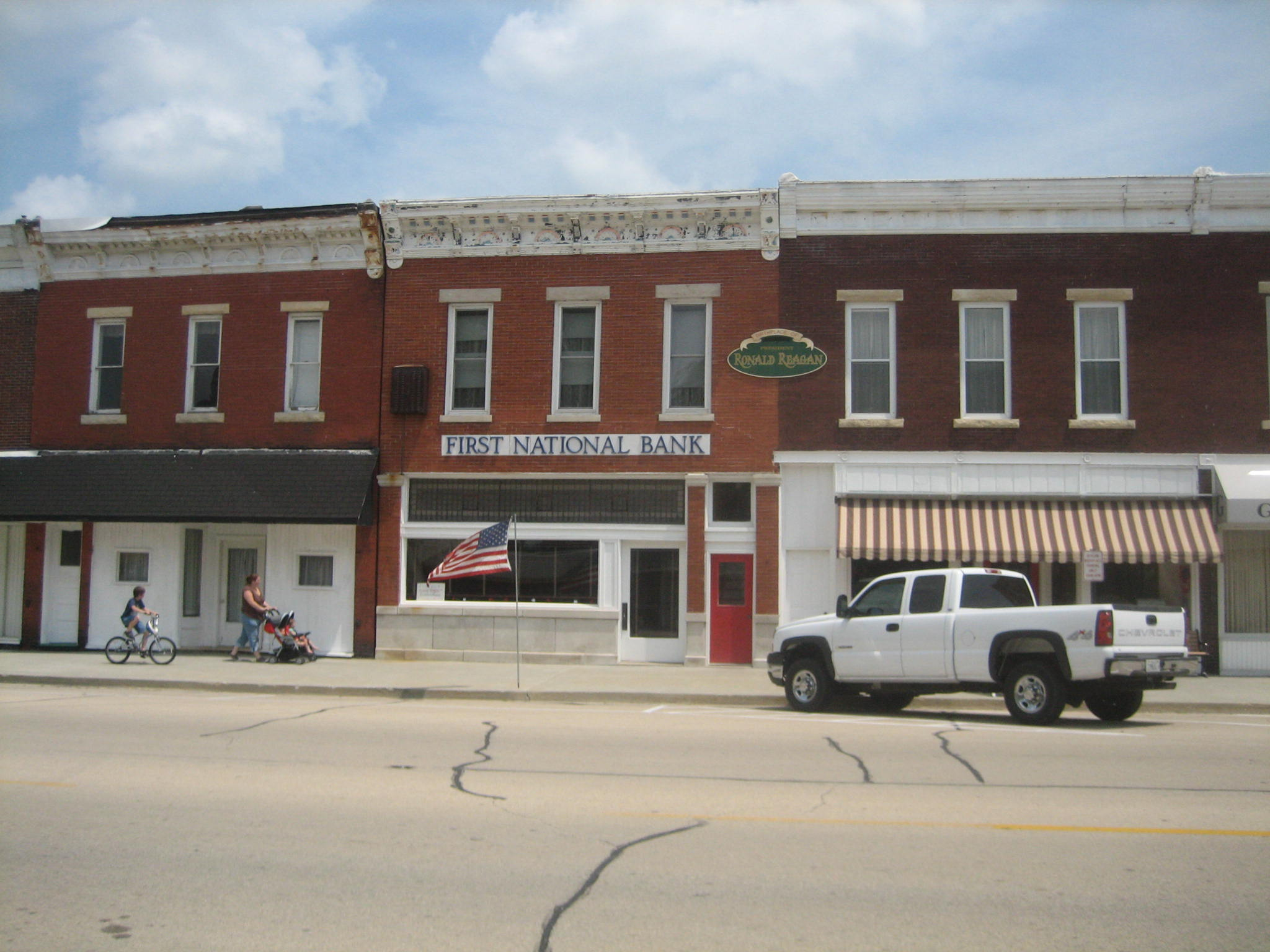
- Ronald Reagan's birthplace (center)

- Location within Illinois Location within the United States
- Interactive map showing the location of the Birthplace of Ronald Reagan
- Location: 111 - 113 S Main St; Tampico, Illinois, U.S.
- Coordinates: 41°37′52″N 89°47′9″W
- Built: 1896
- Architect: Fred Harvey Seymour (builder)
- Part of: Tampico Main Street Historic District (ID82002602)
- Added to NRHP: June 3, 1982

The Birthplace of Ronald Reagan, also known as the Graham Building, is located in an apartment on the second floor of a late 19th-century commercial building in Tampico, Illinois, United States. The building was built in 1896, and housed a tavern from that time until 1915. On February 6, 1911, the future 40th President of the United States, Ronald Reagan, was born in the apartment there. The Reagan family moved into a house in Tampico a few months later.

Architecturally, the two-story brick building is similar to its neighbors, all of which are part of a historic district added to the U.S. National Register of Historic Places in 1982.

== History ==
In 1896, the building was constructed by Fred Harvey Seymour for G.W. Stauffer, and later became known as the "Graham Building." From 1896 to 1915, the first floor of the building housed a tavern, while the second floor contained an apartment. On October 1, 1906, Jack and Nelle Reagan moved into the apartment above the tavern. The Reagans had two sons while they lived in the apartment. In 1908, they had their first son, Neil Reagan. Their second son, Ronald Reagan, was born on February 6, 1911, inside of the second floor apartment. The Reagans lived at the address from 1906 until May 5, 1911, when they moved into a house on Glassburn Street, also in Tampico. While the Reagans lived in Tampico, Jack was employed at the H.C. Pitney Variety Store, which was located across the street from the Reagan Birthplace in the 100 block of Main Street. The Reagans were in Tampico until Pitney's store closed in 1914, after which they settled in Chicago, Galesburg, and Monmouth for various periods of time. Pitney's store reopened in 1919, and the Reagans returned to Tampico for a short while, where they lived in an apartment above the store. Pitney's store again closed, and on December 6, 1920, the Reagans moved to Dixon, Illinois, where they occupied the house that would later be known as the Ronald Reagan Boyhood Home.

From 1915 to 1919, the building housed a bakery. The First National Bank was located in the structure in 1919, where it remained until 1931. The bank's owner and president, R.F. Woods, served as mayor of Tampico from 1917 to 1919. In 1968, the building was purchased by Paul Nicely and his wife. After Mrs. Nicely died in 2003, the building was put up for sale, and was then purchased by WPW Partners of Chicago.

== Architecture ==
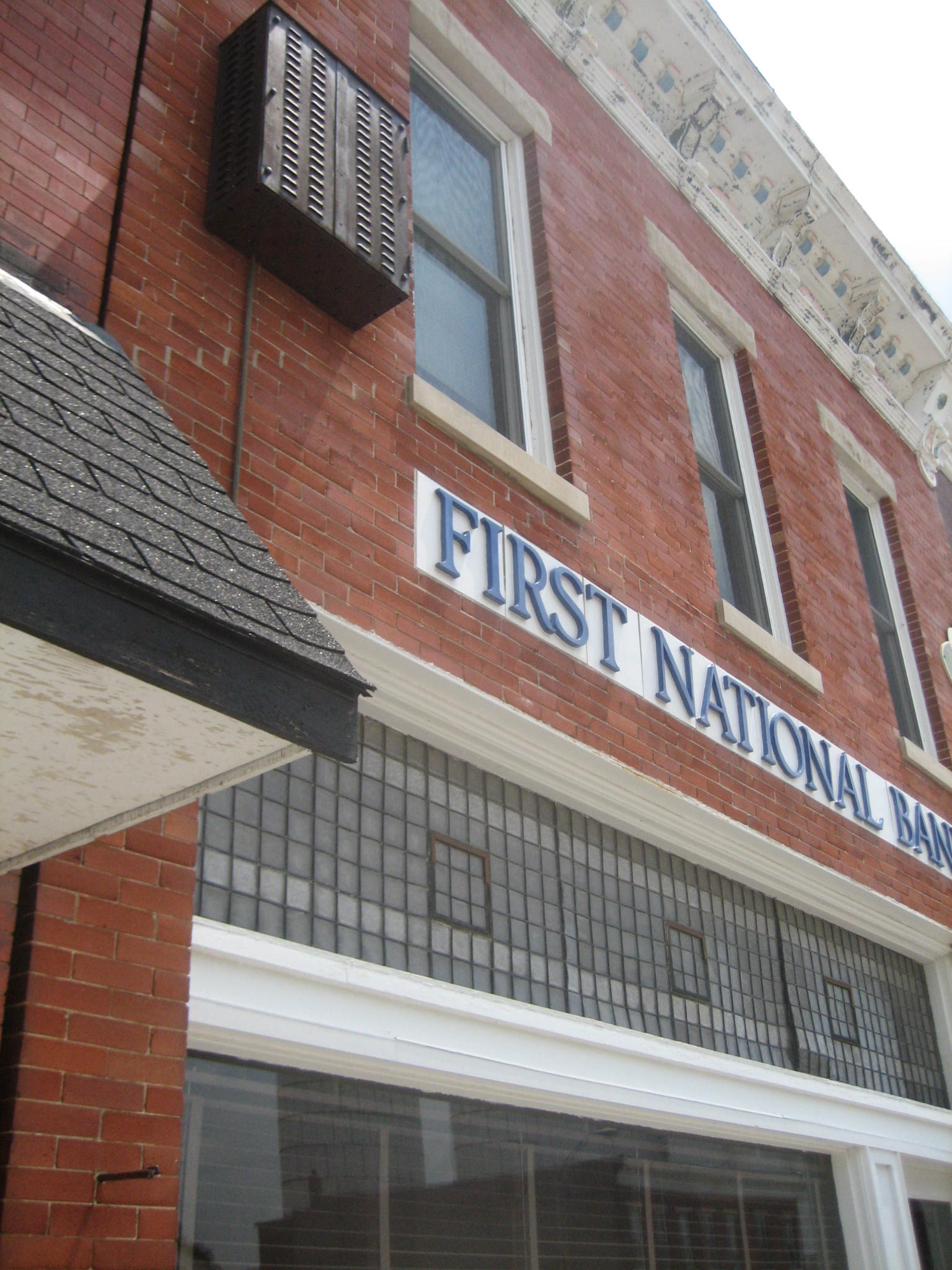
Former U.S. President Ronald Reagan was born in a second floor apartment of what is today a restored, early 20th century bank.

The Reagan Birthplace is similar to most of the commercial buildings along Tampico's Main Street. It is brick, two stories tall, has three second-story windows, and features a cornice. Only the area's oldest buildings differ from the Reagan Birthplace's metal cornices and flat-headed windows.

== Significance ==
The structure known as Ronald Reagan's Birthplace is most notable for being the place where Ronald Reagan was born on February 6, 1911. The building's first floor interior has been restored as the First National Bank, which occupied the property from 1919 to 1931. On the second floor, the apartment's condition has been restored to reflect the historical period when Reagan was born. The site offers tours to the public, and is listed as a “significant” contributing property to the Tampico Main Street Historic District. The Main Street Historic District was added to the U.S. National Register of Historic Places on June 3, 1982.

== See also ==
- List of residences of presidents of the United States
