= Illinois Route 172 =

State highway in northwestern Illinois, US

Illinois Route 172
- IL 172 highlighted in red

Route information
- Maintained by IDOT
- Length: 13.06 mi (21.02 km)
- Existed: 1946–present

Major junctions
- South end: IL 92 in Yorktown
- North end: IL 40 in Tampico

Location
- Country: United States
- State: Illinois
- Counties: Bureau, Whiteside

Highway system
- Illinois State Highway System; Interstate; US; State; Tollways; Scenic
← I-172	→ IL 173

Illinois Route 172 is an inverted-L-shaped highway in northwestern Illinois, though it is marked as being a north–south highway on signage. It runs from Illinois Route 40 to Illinois Route 92 by way of Tampico. This is a distance of 13.06 miles (21.02 km). Illinois 172 is also a part of the Ronald Reagan Trail.

== Route description ==
Illinois 172 runs north from Illinois 92 through Tampico. It then runs east over a feeder for the Hennepin Canal to Illinois 40. Illinois 172 is a two-lane surface road for its entire length. It is known as Main Street through Tampico, Tampico Road around Tampico, and Star Road for the east–west portion.

== History ==
SBI Route 172 originally ran from Libertyville to Gurnee; this became Illinois Route 63, and then Illinois Route 21. In 1946, Illinois 172 was used on former Illinois Route 226, which in addition to its current route ran west to Prophetstown, forming a T-shaped route. The 'spur' to Prophetstown was dropped in 1974. There have been no changes since.

== Major Intersections ==
County	Location	mi	km	Destinations	Notes
Bureau		0.00	0.00	IL 92 – Mendota, Moline	
Whiteside		13.06	21.02	IL 40	
1.000 mi = 1.609 km; 1.000 km = 0.621 mi
