= Nelle Wilson Reagan =

Mother of Ronald Reagan (1883-1962)

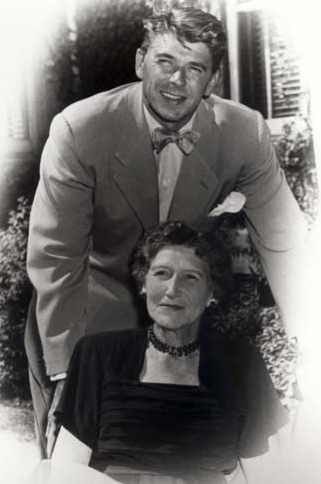
- Nelle Reagan with her son Ronald, 1950
- Born: Nelle Clyde Wilson; July 24, 1883; Fulton, Illinois, U.S.
- Died: July 25, 1962 (aged 79); Santa Monica, California, U.S.
- Burial place: Calvary Cemetery, East Los Angeles, California
- Spouse: Jack Reagan (m. 1904; died 1941)
- Children: Neil; Ronald
- Parents: Thomas Wilson (father); Mary Ann Elsey (mother)

Nelle Clyde Wilson Reagan (July 24, 1883 – July 25, 1962) was the mother of 40th United States President Ronald Reagan and his older brother Neil Reagan.

== Early life ==
Nelle was born in Fulton, Illinois, the oldest of seven children of Mary Ann (née Elsey) and Thomas Wilson. Her father was born in Clyde Township, Whiteside County, Illinois, of Scottish descent (partly by way of today Canada) while her mother was English, born in Epsom, Surrey, United Kingdom of Great Britain and Ireland.

Nelle met Jack Reagan in a farm town along the Illinois prairie. The two were married in Fulton in November 1904. They had two children: Neil "Moon" Reagan (b. 1908) and Ronald Wilson Reagan (b. 1911). After the birth of her second son, Nelle was told not to have any more children. The Reagan family moved from Tampico to many small Illinois towns, and Chicago, depending on Jack's employment.

== Workings with the church ==
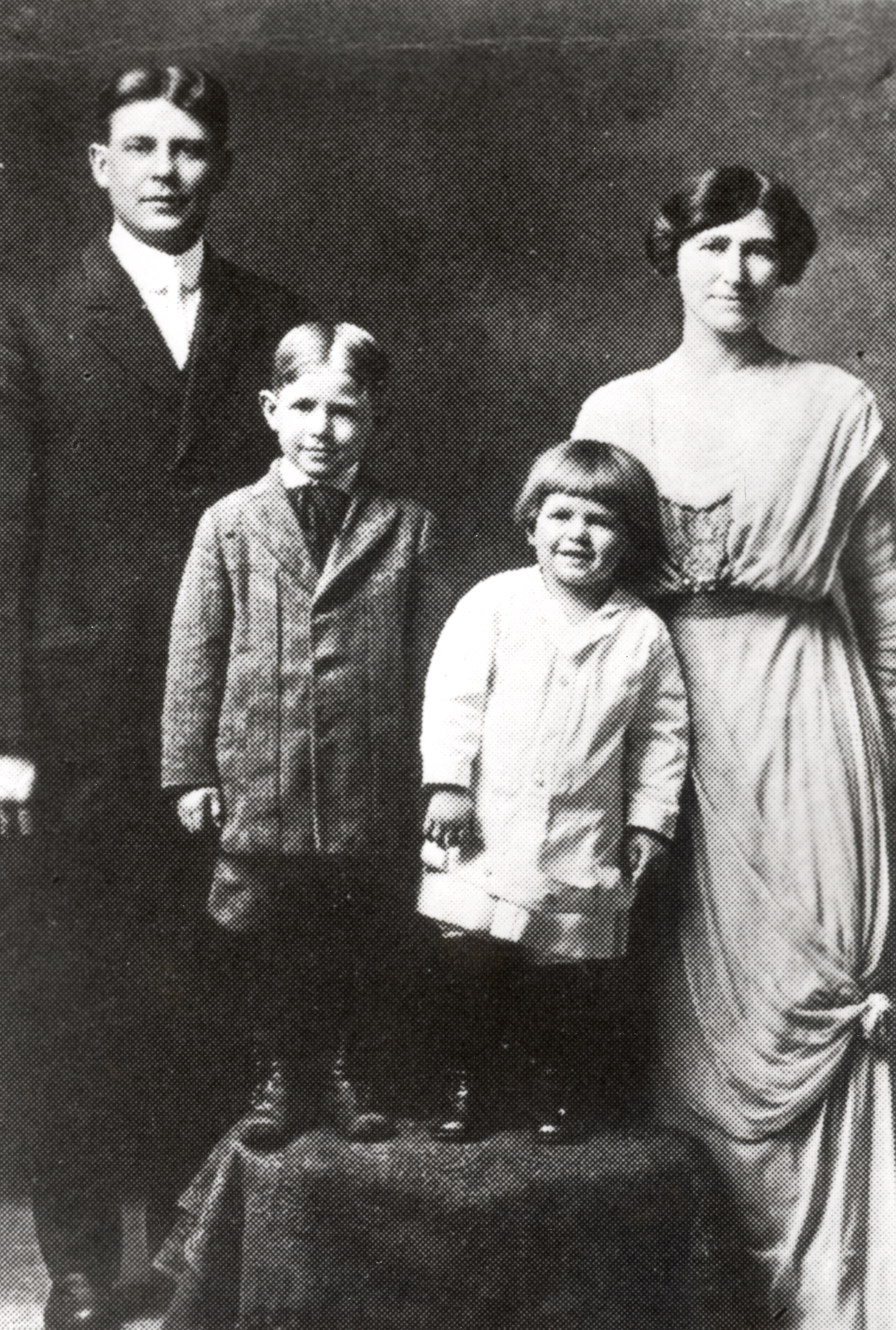
The Reagan family; from left to right: Jack, Neil, Ronald, and Nelle (c. 1915)

Ronald Reagan wrote that his mother "always expected to find the best in people and often did". She attended the Disciples of Christ church regularly and was active, and very influential, within it; she frequently led Sunday school services and gave the Bible readings to the congregation during the services. A strong believer in the power of prayer, she led prayer meetings at church and was in charge of mid-week prayers when the pastor was out of town. She was also an adherent of the Social Gospel movement. Her strong commitment to the church is what induced her son Ronald to become a Protestant Christian rather than a Roman Catholic like his father.

Due to her influence within the church community, one member of the congregation said that "Many of us believed Nelle Reagan had the gift to heal", and fellow churchgoer Mildred Neer recalled Reagan's strong passion for prayer:

When our little daughter was about four years old, she developed what seemed to be tonsillitis ... My husband said to me, 'Why don't you go to church? It will do you good.' [The pastor] spoke on how we as Christians should accept death ... When the service was dismissed, everybody had left except for Mrs. Reagan who was on the platform gathering up the music that the choir members had left. I thought, 'If only I could talk to Mrs. Reagan,' and went up to her. She said, 'Let's get down on our knees and pray about it.' She made a wonderful prayer, [and] Mrs. Reagan spent the whole afternoon in prayer with us ... She left about six o'clock. Moments later, the abscess [on our daughter's neck] burst. God had heard Nelle Reagan's prayer and answered it.

== Participation in amateur theatricals ==
Aside from her work with the church, Nelle acted in many plays. In 1913, she performed in Lizzie May Elwyn's melodrama Millie, the Quadroon; or, Out of Bondage, an historical drama set in the Antebellum south. Nelle performed, in succession, the role of a genteel Northern matron, a nun, and a Southern field-hand. One 1926 review of the play The Ship of Faith said, "Mrs. Reagan is one of Dixon's favorite readers and has appeared before many audiences, always greatly pleasing them."

== Later life and death ==
In 1938, after both Neil and Ronald Reagan had moved to California, Ronald bought his parents a new home in Hollywood; it was the first home they had ever owned. Nelle's life also changed after her husband Jack's death on May 18, 1941, leaving her widowed. She maintained her connections to the church in Dixon and began working at a tuberculosis sanitarium in Southern California. In her later years, however, Nelle had problems with her physical health and senility (later diagnosed as Alzheimer's disease). Speaking of her illness, she said "I just kept my mind on God." Nelle died from complications of the disease on July 25, 1962, a day after her 79th birthday.

== See also ==
- Birthplace of Ronald Reagan
