= Cultural depictions of Ronald Reagan =

Ronald Reagan has been variously depicted in popular culture since 1980, when he was elected president. Reagan also appeared numerous times in popular fiction, particularly in his role as U.S. president in the 1980s.

== Film and television ==
- Rap Master Ronnie: A Report Card, a satirical depiction of Reagan's presidency aired as a Cinemax Comedy Experiment
- Spitting Image, a satirical British puppet show featuring Reagan
- The Day Reagan Was Shot, a 2001 film about the attempted assassination of Ronald Reagan (Richard Crenna)
- The Reagans, a 2003 television film about Ronald Reagan (James Brolin) and his family
- Reagan, a 2011 documentary film about the presidency of Ronald Reagan
- The Butler, a 2013 film about an African-American butler who bore witness to the presidency of Ronald Reagan (Alan Rickman)
- Killing Reagan, a 2016 television film about the attempted assassination of Ronald Reagan
- The Reagans, a 2020 documentary broadcast on Showtime in four parts.
- Reagan, a 2024 film starring Dennis Quaid as Ronald Reagan.

Reagan appeared as one of the fictional supporting characters in the Inhumanoids episode "The Surma Plan" as president of the United States. Upon learning that the Soviet leadership were planning an Earth-threatening attack on the lair of the Inhumanoid leader Metlar, Reagan first suggested that they contact the Soviets. After being advised that the Soviets wouldn't listen he instead contacted the Earth Corps to stop the Soviet mission that could end up destroying the planet itself. He later expressed gratitude to the Earth Corps for stopping the Soviet plan. Reagan was voiced by Neil Ross.

In the second season of the television series Fargo, Reagan (portrayed by Bruce Campbell) makes a stop during his second presidential campaign in 1979 in the titular town; Campbell previously appeared in the 1996 film Fargo on a television screen and credited as "Soap Opera TV Star"; the season retroactively establishes this character as Reagan from his former career as an actor.

In the TV series The 13 Ghosts of Scooby-Doo (1985), episode "It's a Wonderful Scoob," an unnamed President in Reagan's image makes a televised speech where he entreats Scooby-Doo to save America from a ghostly invasion.

In the film Back to the Future (1985), Reagan is referenced when in 1955, Doctor Emmett Brown mocks Marty McFly after Marty tells him Reagan will be president in 1985, because Reagan was still an actor in 1955. Brown imagines Reagan's cabinet being made of comedians such as Jack Benny and Jerry Lewis. Reagan was referenced earlier in the film when his name appeared on a theater marquee.

In Back to the Future Part II (1989), Reagan has a Max Headroom-style AI that speaks in his voice and stutters just like Max. The AI serves as a waiter in the Cafe 80s, who gets interrupted by an AI of Ayatollah Ruhollah Khomeini who tries to tell Marty McFly to order the "Hostage Special" instead of the Cajun Style Mesquite Grilled Sushi. However, Marty tells them both that all he wants is a Pepsi-Cola.

In the China, IL episode "Rewind, Pause, Pay!", Reagan is featured as a time traveler who seeks revenge on Professor Steve Smith for doing impressions of him for a talent show.

In the Smiling Friends episode "Frowning Friends", the character Mr. Boss has a meeting with his "financial advisors" — caricatures of Ronald Reagan (voiced by Zach Hadel) along with Warren Buffett and Mr. Peanut — only for them to turn out to be hallucinations. In the later episode "Mr. President", Reagan is implied to have lost the 1980 United States presidential election, with it being stated that "Shrimpo Jones" won in a landslide victory.

== Literature ==
=== Comics ===
Ronald Reagan met Captain America in Marvel Comics, would become the paranormal hero "Teflon" in New Universe and was even depicted as the star of the Solsons' Comics series Reagans Raiders, in 1987.

Marvel Transformers UK Annual 1985 contained a story called "Plague of the Insecticons". Optimus Prime leads Prowl and Warpath to a meeting with Reagan in Washington D.C. to open a dialog between the Autobots and the US government. The evil Insecticons attack the US military in the name of the Autobots, hoping to derail the peace talks. Although the Autobots managed to chase off the Insecticons, Optimus Prime gives up on explaining the misunderstanding to Reagan, thinking he would never be believed. Reagan had been ready to hear what Optimus had to say and was disappointed they gave up so easily. In 1986, Reagan made an appearance in the eighth issue of the DC Comics series Booster Gold.

Reagan would also make an appearance in Strontium Dog, a long running strip in the British comic 2000 AD. In the storyline 'Bitch' (Progs 505–529, 1987), he is kidnapped and held hostage by time-travelling alien freedom fighters. The Reagan of this story is depicted as somewhat bumbling and not at all aware of what is happening; despite all evidence to the contrary, he maintains the opinion throughout that he has been kidnapped by the 'Commies'.

In the 1986 miniseries The Dark Knight Returns, Superman is an operative for the United States government, covertly fighting Soviet forces in Latin America and serving as the president's right-hand man. Though unnamed, this president bears an identical resemblance to Reagan, who was in office when the comic was published. He also possesses Reagan's folksy way of speaking.

In 1987's "Ten Nights of the Beast" (Batman #417-420, 1987), Batman serves as Reagan's bodyguard.

Reagan was also a key character in the satirical comic strip Benchley by Mort Drucker and Jerry Dumas. The plot revolved around the fictive character Benchley who served as Reagan's assistant.

=== Web original ===
On the collaborative fiction writing website SCP Foundation, Ronald Reagan is depicted in SCP-1981, an anomalous VHS tape that depicts the president giving corrupted versions of his Evil Empire speech while accompanied by a black hooded figure, all while being gradually mutilated by an unseen force until he is unable to continue speaking. The tape changes in content every time it is viewed. The real-life Reagan of the SCP universe was said to have developed an unhealthy obsession and chronic nightmares with SCP-1981 after being shown the tape, and developed Alzheimer's disease after Secret Service agents' unqualified attempt at inducing a drug-induced amnesia using amnestics stolen from the SCP Foundation.

== Music ==
Reagan is the subject of many songs.

== Toys ==
In 2020, Amazo Toys ran a successful Kickstarter campaign for the United States Space Force Action Figures. The basic 4 inch tall action figure for the Space Force Red team came with six head options, one of which was the Ghost of Ronald Reagan. In the series fiction the Ghost of Ronald Reagan is part of the Space Force Red team, led by Donald Trump, which is teamed up with the Space Force Blue team to right the Russian Space Agency.

A second Kickstarter campaign by Amazo Toys was American Presidents Action Figure Collection which included a Ronald Reagan figure with two alternate heads.

== Video games ==
- Reagan is featured as an easter egg in 2002 video game Grand Theft Auto: Vice City, where he is seen in a poster shooting then-Soviet leader Mikhail Gorbachev. He is also mentioned in the 2006 prequel game Grand Theft Auto: Vice City Stories.
- On August 26, 2020, in the worldwide reveal of Call of Duty: Black Ops Cold War, Reagan is the president of the United States in the campaign. He is voiced by Jeff Bergman.
- In the video game Wasteland 3, a digitized AI brain scan of Ronald Reagan is displayed on a computer screen similar to how Max Headroom was often depicted.

== Postage stamps ==
In 2005, following Reagan's death, the United States Postal Service issued a President Ronald Reagan commemorative postage stamp.

== See also ==
- "What would Reagan do?" is a phrase that has become popular, primarily among conservatives and Republicans in the United States.

== See also ==
- Cultural depictions of Margaret Thatcher
