= Jack Reagan =

American salesman (1883–1941)

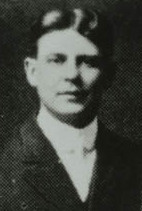
- Reagan in 1915
- Born: John Edward Reagan; July 13, 1883; Fulton, Illinois, U.S.
- Died: May 18, 1941 (aged 57); Santa Monica, California, U.S.
- Burial place: Calvary Cemetery, East Los Angeles
- Political party: Democratic
- Spouse: Nelle Wilson (m. 1904)
- Children: Neil; Ronald
Parents
- John Michael Reagan
- Jennie Cusick
Jack Reagan
Works Progress Administration Local Director
- In office 1935–1937

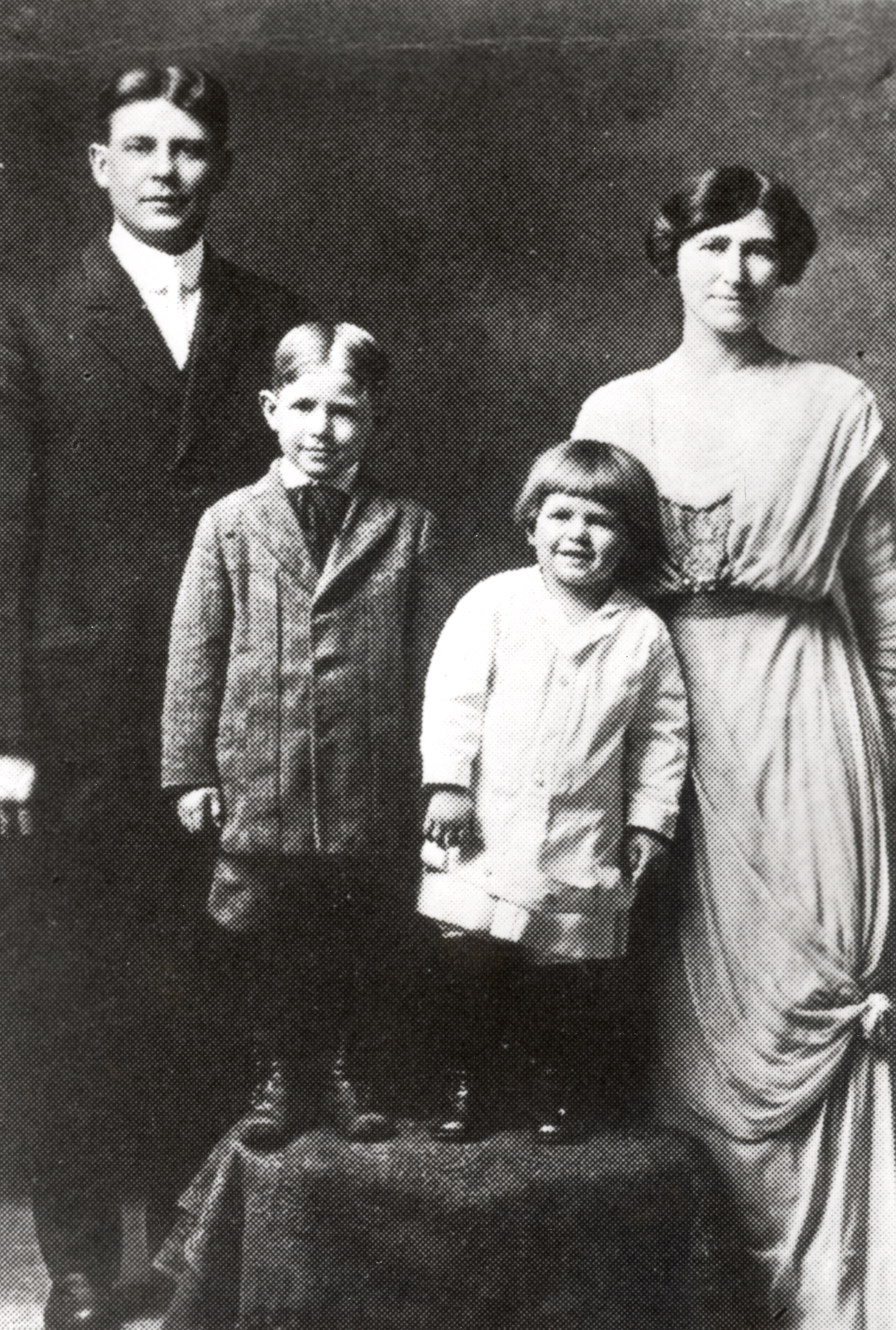
The Reagan family; from left to right: Jack, Neil, Ronald, and Nelle (c. 1915)

John Edward Reagan (July 13, 1883 – May 18, 1941) was an American salesman. He was the father of U.S. president Ronald Reagan.

== Ancestry ==
Jack's paternal grandfather, Michael O'Regan, son of Thomas O'Regan and wife Margaret Murphy, was a native of the village of Ballyporeen, County Tipperary, Munster, Ireland, where he was baptized in 1829. O'Regan worked as a tenant farmer during his early years in Ireland, before he moved to London not later than 1851. While living there, O'Regan married an Irish refugee named Catherine Mulcahey, daughter of Patrick Mulcahey and wife, and anglicized his family surname to "Reagan" before emigrating to Carroll County, Illinois, in 1857. John Michael, their son, born in 1855, became a grain elevator laborer and farmer, and married Jennie Cusick in 1878. Cusick was born in 1857 in today Canada, but, like John Michael, her parents Patrick Cusick (son of Patrick Thomas Cusick and wife Jean Gabbert) and wife Sarah Higgins came from Ireland. Their son, John Edward "Jack", was born five years later, in 1883.

8. Thomas O'Regan
4. Michael O'Regan then Reagan
9. Margaret Murphy
2. John Michael Reagan
10. Patrick Mulcahey
5. Catherine Mulcahey
1. John Edward "Jack" Reagan
12. Patrick Thomas Cusick
6. Patrick Cusick
13. Jean Gabbert
3. Jennie Cusick
7. Sarah Higgins

== Life and career ==
At the time of his second son Ronald's birth in 1911, the 27-year-old Jack was working at a store in Tampico, Illinois. He went on to work as a traveling salesman during Ronald's childhood. Politically, he was a populist Democrat, supporting economically progressive policies such as financial support for the working poor, trust-busting, child labor laws, a minimum wage, and progressive taxation. From his Irish heritage he inherited a dislike of the British Empire. He was a keen supporter of the United States' involvement in World War I and attempted to enlist. He was strongly opposed to the Ku Klux Klan due to his Catholic heritage, but also due to the Klan's antisemitism and racism. Reagan was a member of the Catholic men's organization the Knights of Columbus, according to an address given to the group by his son, President Ronald Reagan in 1986. It has also been reported that Jack at one point served as the local director of the Works Progress Administration office in Dixon.

Reagan died on May 18, 1941, at the age of 57 after a series of heart attacks. It has been suggested that he might have survived if a nearby ambulance had been allowed to cross out of their service territory. This possibility may have been one reason that Ronald Reagan, as governor of California, signed into law the Wedworth-Townsend Paramedic Act of 1970, authorizing the first paramedic program in the United States.

== See also ==
- Birthplace of Ronald Reagan
- Pitney Variety Store
