= Hazel A. McCaskrin =

American politician (1901–1954)

Member of the Illinois House of Representatives from the 33rd district
- In office 1947–1949
- In office 1951–1954

Personal details
- Born: Hazel A. Pierce; January 9, 1901 Tampico, Illinois, U.S.
- Died: December 2, 1954 (aged 53) Near Long Grove, Illinois, U.S.
- Party: Republican
- Spouse: Harry M. McCaskrin (m. 1911; died 1942)
- Occupation: Politician

Hazel A. McCaskrin (née Pierce; January 9, 1901 – December 2, 1954) was an American politician.

== Background ==
Born in Tampico, Illinois, McCaskrin moved to Rock Island, Illinois and graduated from Rock Island High School. She was a Republican. In 1911, McCaskrin married Harry M. McCaskrin, who served in the Illinois House of Representatives from 1921 to 1941. She also served as his secretary. McCaskrin also served in the Illinois House of Representatives from 1947 to 1949 and then from 1951 until her death in 1954. She represented the 33rd district. McCaskrin was killed in an auto accident near Long Grove, Illinois on December 2, 1954. She had been reelected to office at the time of her death.
