= Doughboys in Ireland =

1943 film by Lew Landers

- Directed by: Lew Landers
- Written by: Howard J. Green; Monte Brice
- Produced by: Jack Fier
- Starring: Kenny Baker; Jeff Donnell; Lynn Merrick; Robert Mitchum
- Cinematography: L. William O'Connell
- Edited by: Mel Thorsen
- Music by: John Leipold
- Production company: Columbia Pictures
- Distributed by: Columbia Pictures
- Release date: October 7, 1943
- Running time: 61 minutes
- Country: United States
- Language: English

Doughboys in Ireland is a 1943 American musical war film directed by Lew Landers and starring Kenny Baker, Jeff Donnell and Lynn Merrick. The film offered an early role for future star Robert Mitchum, who appeared in many films that year.

== Plot ==
A group of American troops are stationed in Ireland, where they come into conflict with the locals.

== Cast ==
- Kenny Baker as Danny O'Keefe
- Jeff Donnell as Molly Callahan
- Lynn Merrick as Gloria Gold
- Robert Mitchum as Ernie Jones
- George Tyne as Jimmy Martin
- Harry Shannon as Michael Callahan
- Dorothy Vaughan as Mrs. Callahan
- Larry Thompson as Captain
- Syd Saylor as Sergeant
- Herbert Rawlinson as Larry Hunt
- Neil Reagan as Medical Captain
- The Jesters as Singing Group

== Bibliography ==
- Biskupski, M.B.B. Hollywood's War with Poland, 1939-1945. University Press of Kentucky, 2011.
- Krutnik, Frank. In a Lonely Street: Film Noir, Genre, Masculinity. Routledge, 2006.
