= Harry M. McCaskrin =

American politician

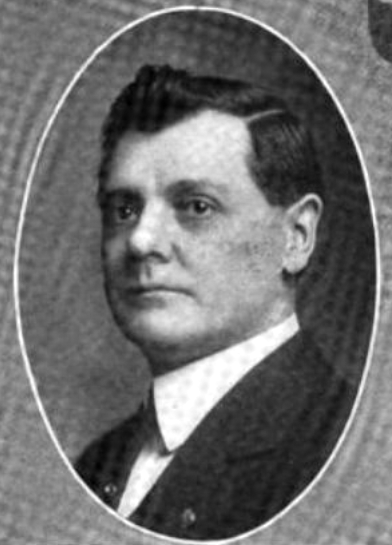

Member of the Illinois House of Representatives
- In office 1920–1940

Personal details
- Born: Harry Madison McCaskrin; August 26, 1873 Rantoul, Illinois
- Died: April 10, 1942 (aged 68) Rock Island, Illinois
- Party: Republican
- Spouse: Hazel A. McCaskrin
- Education: University of Illinois Urbana-Champaign; University of Michigan Law School
- Occupation: Lawyer, politician

Harry Madison McCaskrin (August 26, 1873 – April 10, 1942) was an American lawyer and politician.

== Background ==
McCaskrin was born in Rantoul, Illinois. He graduated from Rantoul High School in 1890. He received his bachelor of science degree from University of Illinois Urbana-Champaign in 1894 and his law degree from University of Michigan Law School in 1896. He practiced law in Rock Island, Illinois. He served in the Illinois House of Representatives from 1921 to 1941 and was a Republican. He died at his home in Rock Island, Illinois. His wife Hazel also served in the Illinois House of Representatives.
