= John B. Esnard =

American politician (1846–1931)

Member of the Louisiana House of Representatives from the St. Mary Parish district
- In office 1868–1870

Personal details
- Born: 1846 New Orleans, Louisiana, US
- Died: June 2, 1931 (aged 84–85) Los Angeles, California, US
- Resting place: Calvary Cemetery, Los Angeles, California, U.S.
- Children: 7
- Occupation: Politician

John B. Esnard (1846 – June 2, 1931) was an American politician. Born enslaved, he served in the Louisiana House of Representatives from 1868 to 1870.

== Biography ==
John B. Esnard was born in 1846, in New Orleans, to a slaveholder, and was of French descent. He was described as mulatto and when asked if he was a "colored man" he said "I cannot answer that; I do not know exactly whether I am or not". He served during the American Civil War in the Union Army.

Esnard represented St. Mary Parish along with A. J. Demarest at the 1868 Louisiana Constitutional Convention. Along with P. B. S. Pinchback, O. C. Blandin and Auguste Donato Jr., he signed the new constitution but registered protest against Article 99, which they believed went against their Radical Republican support of universal suffrage.

Esnard and Demarest were then elected to represent St. Mary Parish in the Louisiana House of Representatives. Due to threats, made he fled north, but returned soon after to take his seat, serving from 1868 to 1870. During his tenure, he served on the Committee on Railways. One source erroneously claims that he represented the Iberia Parish in the Louisiana State Senate from 1870 until 1876.

Esnard was married to Florentine K. Esnard, and had four sons and three daughters. He moved to Los Angeles c. 1913, dying there on July 2, 1931, aged 84 or 85. He was buried at Calvary Cemetery.

== See also ==
- African American officeholders from the end of the Civil War until before 1900
