= Calvary Cemetery (Los Angeles) =

Cemetery located in California, U.S.

Calvary Cemetery and Mortuary
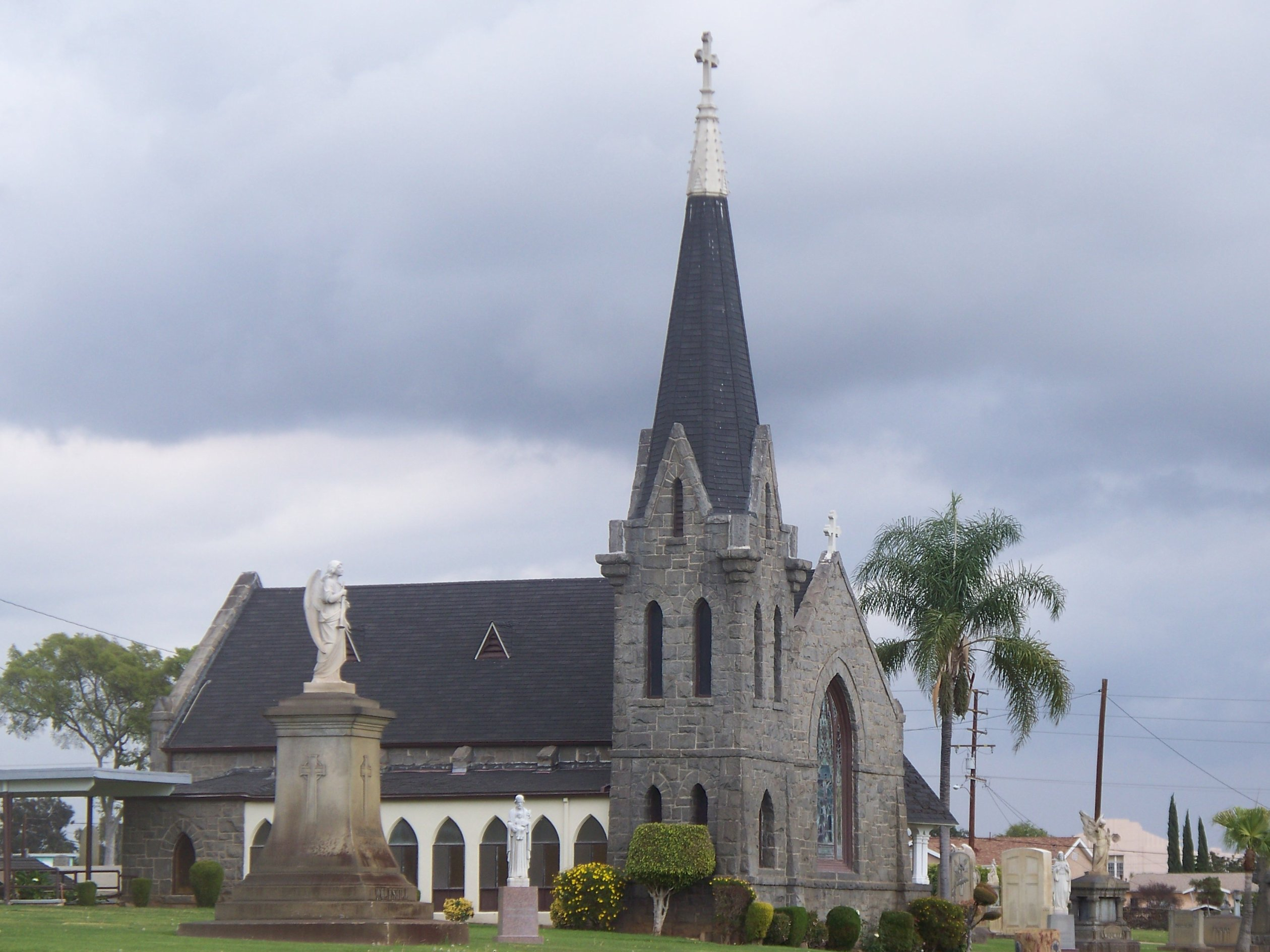
- Interactive map of Calvary Cemetery and Mortuary

Details
- Established: 1896
- Location: 4201 Whittier Boulevard, East Los Angeles, California, U.S.
- Country: United States
- Coordinates: 34°01′42″N 118°10′36″W
- Type: Roman Catholic
- Owned by: Roman Catholic Archdiocese of Los Angeles
- Size: 137 acres (55 ha)
- Website: Official website
- Find a Grave: Calvary Cemetery and Mortuary

Calvary Cemetery and Mortuary is a Catholic cemetery and funeral home operated by the Archdiocese of Los Angeles in East Los Angeles, California, United States. It is also called New Calvary Cemetery because it succeeded the original Calvary Cemetery (on north Broadway), over which Cathedral High School was built.

== History ==
=== Old Calvary ===
When Los Angeles was originally surveyed and mapped under the leadership of Gen. Edward Ord in 1849, its graveyard was at the upper end of Eternity Street. At the lower end of Eternity was the first church in Los Angeles, the Placita. In between lay a part of town flanked by adobe houses, citrus trees, and Coast Live Oaks suitable for traditional funeral processions escorting believers to eternity. The land allotted to the cemetery lay between a creek a half block north of College Street and the toma (intake of the Zanja Madre) beyond the northern edge of town. That cemetery was named Calvary.

All the important magnates of the country around Los Angeles were buried at Calvary, such as Gen. Andrés Pico, the hero of the Battle of San Pascual, and Don Abel Stearns, a man of many ranchos. The ravine sloping down from the west took its name; it was called "Cemetery Ravine" (now Chavez Ravine, home of Dodger Stadium). Later, a Protestant cemetery for Los Angeles was laid out atop Fort Hill, where Grand Arts High School and the Cathedral of Our Lady of the Angels are now.

As Los Angeles swelled with settlers, so also did old Calvary Cemetery grow in size and importance, and a chapel was built. Large in scale for the desert Southwest of Southern California, that chapel was dedicated to the memory of a patron, Andrew Briswalter, who died in 1885. When conditions led to the founding of a new, even bigger cemetery on the other side of the Los Angeles River in 1896—in East Los Angeles—the property of the historic cemetery was put to other uses. At the time, many Italians began moving into the north side of Los Angeles, where they founded a new church on north Spring Street. So many Italians moved in, that the upper part of town became known as "Little Italy." As it grew, a new, more permanent church building was sought, so parishioners bought the chapel of old Calvary Cemetery. The first child was baptized there in September 1904. The chapel was formally established as a church when Fr. A. Bucci dedicated the chapel of the old cemetery as St. Peter's Church on July 4, 1915.

Old Calvary's historic chapel survives today in the parish and buildings of St. Peter's Italian Catholic Church, 1039 N Broadway. Historic old Calvary Cemetery was built over and much of it is now occupied by Cathedral High School.

=== Current plots ===
The current site across the river and uphill, measuring 137 acres, was dedicated in 1896. All Souls Chapel was built on the grounds in 1902, and was dedicated on All Souls' Day of that same year. Bishop George Thomas Montgomery offered a Solemn Pontifical Mass on a temporary altar at the site, and afterwards presided at the setting in place of the cornerstone. It was designed as a replica of the parish church of St. Giles in the rural town of Stoke Poges, Buckinghamshire, in England. That church is believed to have been the setting of the famed 18th-century poem Elegy Written in a Country Churchyard. The chapel became one of the most visited places of worship in Southern California after its opening. All Souls Chapel is now used primarily for burial services.

The Main Mausoleum, with a new chapel, was built in 1929. It was designed by architect Ross Montgomery. Two additional mausoleums, Our Lady's Garden and Gethsemane, have since been built. The cemetery has its own chaplain and daily Mass is offered in the chapel of the Main Mausoleum.

== Notable burials ==
- Beatrice Dominguez (1896–1921), actress and dancer
- Bryan Foy (1896–1977), film producer and director
- Bull Montana (1887–1950), wrestler, boxer, actor
- Cedric Gibbons (1893–1960), prolific film art director and production designer
- Dolores Costello (1903–1979), actress
- Eddie Collins (1883–1940), actor
- Edward L. Doheny (1856–1935), oil tycoon
- Elaine Hammerstein (1897–1948), actress
- Emilio Kosterlitzky (1853–1928), Russian-born linguist and soldier of fortune
- Ethel Barrymore (1879–1959), actress
- Etta McDaniel (1890–1946), actress and sister of performers Hattie McDaniel & Sam McDaniel
- Eugenie Besserer (1868–1934), actress
- Francelia Billington (1895–1934), actress
- Frank H. Spearman (1859–1937), American writer
- Hal Roach, Jr. (1918–1972), film producer
- Harry F. Sinclair (1876–1956), oil industrialist
- Helene Costello (1906–1957), actress
- Henry Gage (1852–1924), governor of California
- Hi Bell (1897–1949), baseball player
- Hugo Reid (1811–1852), prominent early L.A. County resident, originally interred in El Campo Santo cemetery
- Irene Dunne (1898–1990), actress
- J. Carrol Naish (1896–1973), actor
- Jack Dragna (1891–1956), Los Angeles crime family boss
- Jack Reagan (1883–1941), father of Ronald Reagan
- Ferdinand "Jelly Roll" Morton (1885–1941), musician
- Jimmy Murphy (1894–1924), race car driver
- John B. Esnard (1846–1931), reconstruction era politician in Louisiana
- John Barrymore (1882–1942), stage, screen and radio actor
- John Henry Slattery (died 1933), Colorado state politician
- John Hodiak (1914–1955), actor
- Jose Yarba (1892–1957), aka Mexican Joe Rivers, boxer
- Kathryn Adams (1893–1959), actress
- King Baggot (1879–1948), actor, screenwriter/director
- Leno La Bianca (1925–1969), murdered by the Charles Manson family
- Lionel Barrymore (1878–1954), actor
- Lou Costello (1906–1959), actor and comedian
- Mabel Normand (1892–1930), actress and comedian
- Mae Costello (1882–1929), actress
- Marguerite Nichols (1891–1941), actress
- Martin F. Betkouski (1860–1942), Los Angeles City Council member
- Mary Carr (1874–1973), actress
- Mary Philbin (1902–1993), actress
- Matt Moore (1888–1960), actor
- Maurice Costello (1877–1950), actor
- Mervin King (1914–2008), Los Angeles Police Department captain
- Mykolas Birziska (1882–1962), educator, Vilnius University Rector, co-author and signer of Lithuania's Declaration of Independence
- Nelle Wilson Reagan (1883–1962), mother of Ronald Reagan
- Owen Moore (1886–1939), actor
- Pauline O'Neill (1865–1961), wife of Buckey O'Neill of Rough Rider fame
- Pola Negri (1897–1987), actress
- Ramón Novarro (1899–1968), actor
- Ray Prim (1906–1995), baseball player
- Richard Boleslawski (1889–1937), director
- Rosario DeSimone (1873–1946), Los Angeles crime family boss
- Sarah E. Kellogg (1870–1957), politician, postmaster, and a real estate agent
- Stepin Fetchit (1902–1985), comedian
- Ted Healy (1896–1937), actor/original leader of The Three Stooges
- Timothy Manning (1909–1989), Roman Catholic cardinal, third Archbishop of Los Angeles
- Trixie Friganza (1870–1955), actress
- Victor Varconi (1891–1976), Hungarian-born American actor
- William W. Dixon (1838–1910), U.S. Representative (Democrat, Fifty-Second Congress). Later moved to Rock Creek Cemetery, Washington, D.C.
- Ysabel del Valle (1837–1905), rancho owner
- Zachariah Montgomery (1825–1900), Assistant Attorney General in first Administration of President Grover Cleveland

== See also ==
- List of United States cemeteries
