= H. C. Pitney Variety Store Building =

United States historic place, early childhood home of Ronald Reagan

- H.C. Pitney Variety Store Building
- U.S. Historic district – Contributing property
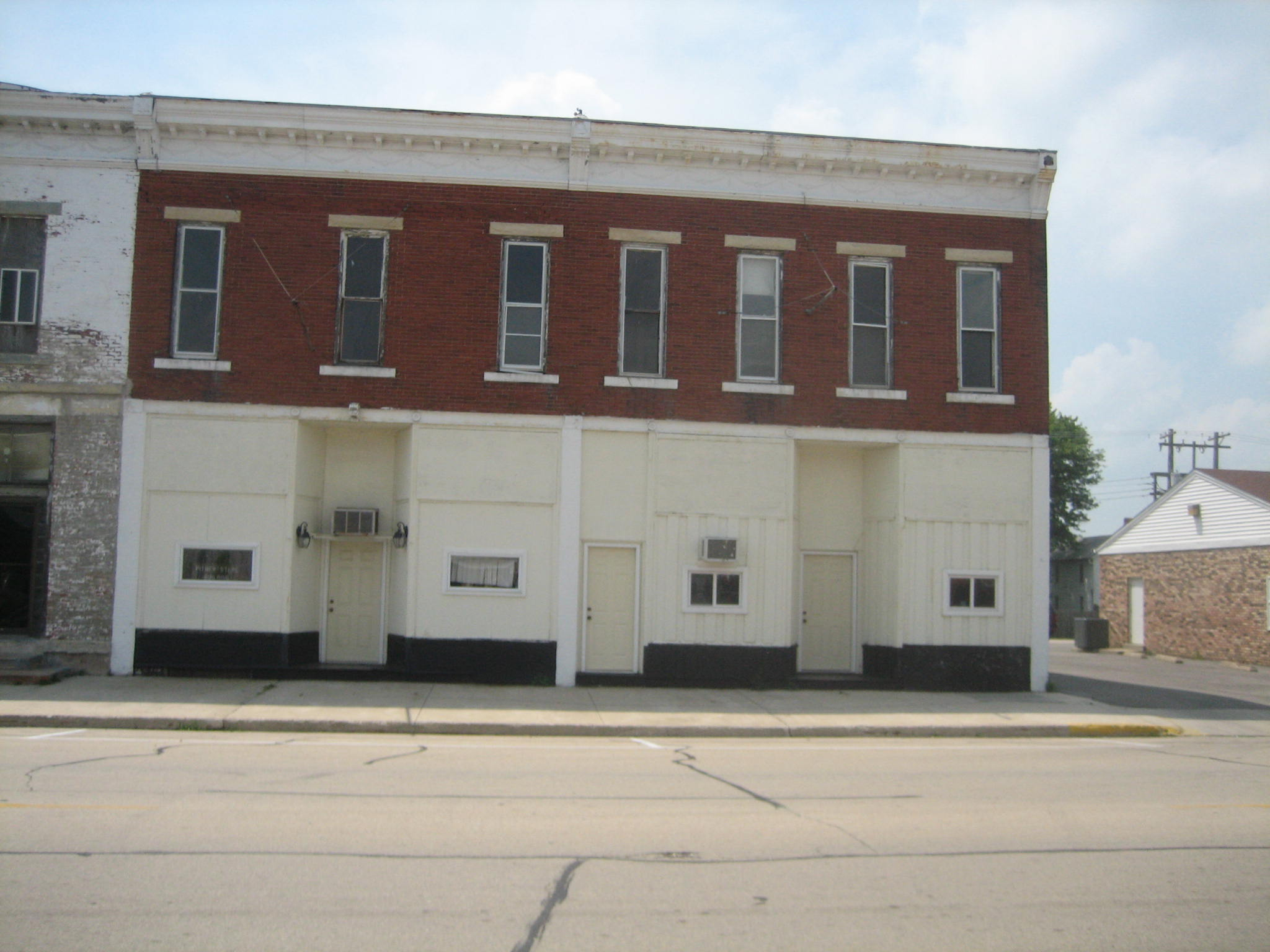
- Location: Tampico, Whiteside County, Illinois
- Coordinates: 41°37′53″N 89°47′9″W
- Built: 1900
- Part of: Main Street Historic District (Tampico, Illinois) (ID882002602)
- Added to NRHP: June 3, 1982

The H.C. Pitney Variety Store Building is a commercial building in downtown Tampico, Illinois, United States, constructed in 1900. The building is part of a two-story commercial block along Main Street.

Between 1919 and 1920, H.C. Pitney operated the building as the H.C. Pitney Variety Store, and the second-floor apartment was occupied by the family of 40th U.S. President Ronald Reagan. It is listed as a contributing property to the Tampico Main Street Historic District, which was added to the U.S. National Register of Historic Places in 1982.

== History ==
The building, consisting of two store fronts, was erected by Ray McKenzie in 1900. The H.C. Pitney Variety Store occupied the property, under various owners, from 1911 until 1920. H.C. Pitney owned the store from 1911 until 1914, when he sold it. During his first period of ownership, Pitney employed Jack Reagan, the father of 40th U.S. President Ronald Reagan, as a clerk. While Jack Reagan was employed by Pitney, Ronald was born in the apartment over a bakery/restaurant building at 109 Main Street, across Main Street from the Variety Store. After Pitney sold the store in 1914, the Reagans left Tampico.

In 1919, Pitney returned to ownership of the Variety Store and Jack Reagan returned at the same time to work for him. Beginning on August 25, 1919, the Reagan family occupied the apartment above the commercial portion of the building. After Pitney closed the store, the Reagans vacated the premises in December 1920 and moved to Dixon, Illinois.

== Architecture ==
The building once occupied by the H.C. Pitney Variety Store is part of a commercial block and it stands connected to the building next to it. Of the two structures in the block the Pitney Store is the newer; the other building was built a year earlier. The two-story brick building features a metal cornice and two storefronts listed at different addresses. The first store front, at 124 Main Street is 3 bays wide and the second, at 122 Main Street, is 4 bays wide. The building's windows are flat headed and have stone lintels and sills. The storefronts are still intact but the original windows have been boarded over and painted.

== Significance ==
The family of Ronald Reagan occupied the second floor apartment at the H.C. Pitney Variety Store from August 1919 until December 1920. The building was listed as a "significant" contributing property to the Tampico Main Street Historic District when it joined the U.S. National Register of Historic Places on June 3, 1982.

== See also ==
- Ronald Reagan Birthplace
- Ronald Reagan Boyhood Home
- List of residences of presidents of the United States
