= Main Street Historic District (Tampico, Illinois) =

Historic district in Illinois, United States

- U.S. National Register of Historic Places
- U.S. Historic district
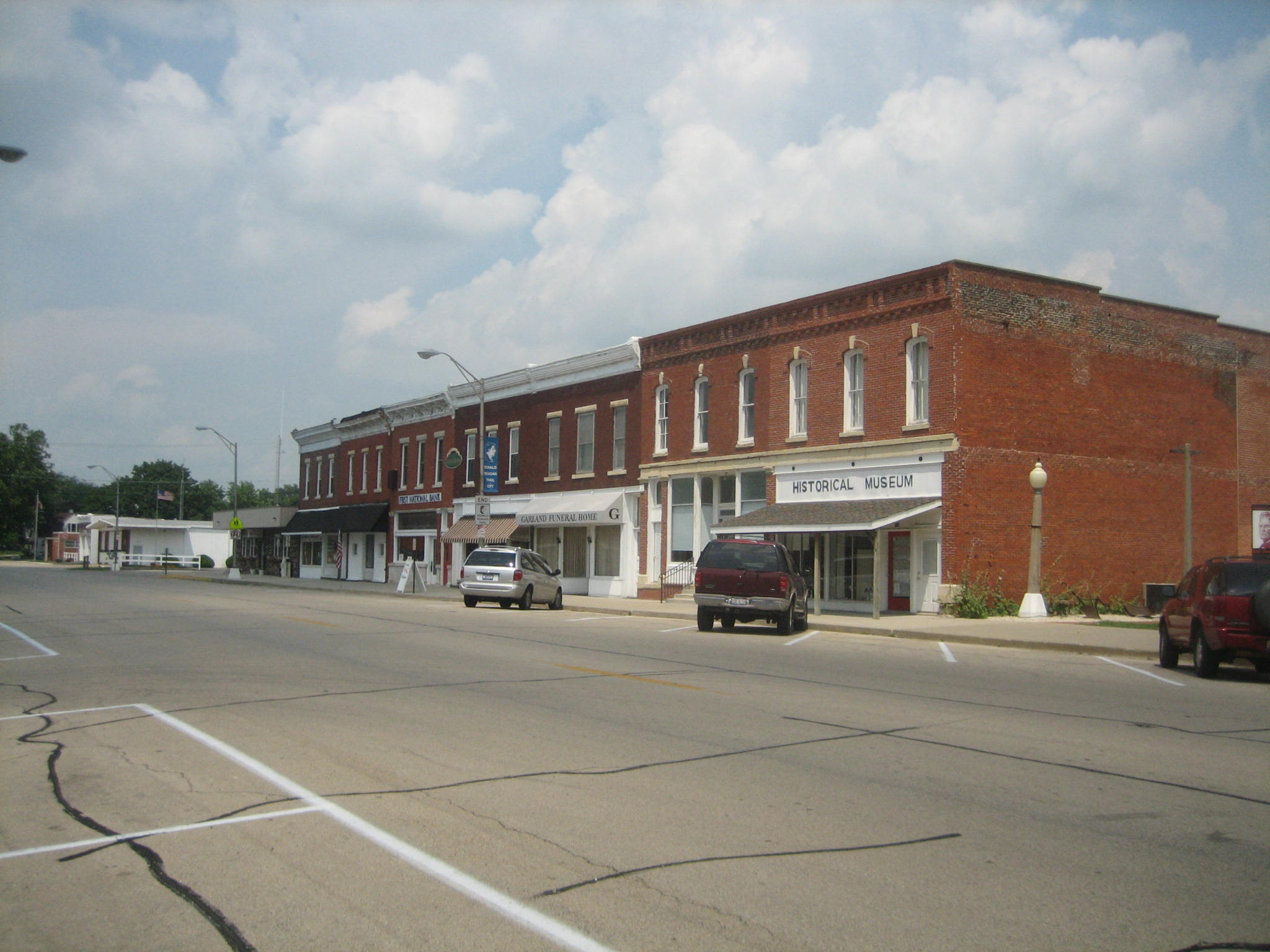
- The 100 block of Main Street, Tampico, Illinois.

- Location within Illinois Location within the United States
- Location: S. Main St., Tampico, Illinois
- Coordinates: 41°37′52″N 89°47′9″W
- Area: 2.3 acres (0.93 ha)
- Built: various
- Architect: various
- NRHP reference No.: 82002602
- Added to NRHP: June 3, 1982

The Main Street Historic District in Tampico, Illinois, United States, is a historic district notable as home to the birthplace of Ronald Reagan. The district includes the late 19th century collection of buildings that comprise Tampico's central business district; among them are two apartments that the Reagan family occupied in the early 1900s. The buildings in the district went through several periods of rebuilding during the 1870s due to major fires and a tornado. The district boundaries encompass the 100 block of Main Street and exclude properties that do not date from the historic period.

The historic district represents an intact commercial district representative of rural, small town Illinois. The buildings present a cohesive architectural unit; each building within is dependent on the others for its significance. The district's contributing properties are divided into two major categories, "contributing structures" and "significant structures." Both commercial buildings that the Reagans occupied second floor apartments in are listed as "significant." The Main Street Historic District was added to the U.S. National Register of Historic Places in 1982.

== History ==
Tampico, Illinois, in southeastern Whiteside County, was founded in 1858 but settlers did not arrive in earnest until 1871, partially due to the swampy nature of the terrain. After the Chicago, Burlington and Quincy Railroad constructed a line through Tampico in 1871 growth was rapid but faced a series of major setbacks. In 1872, 1874 and 1876 the village was struck by major fires which required the repeated rebuilding of the town's central business district along Main Street. A tornado destroyed about 40 buildings in 1874, adding to the headache caused by the fires. As a result of the repeated rebuilding, all buildings along Main Street built after 1876 are constructed from brick.

Between 1896 and 1905 the Main Street district in Tampico went through a building boom. Many agriculturally oriented industries located in Tampico during this time period. The construction of the Hennepin Canal from 1899 to 1907 also contributed to the influx of new buildings in Tampico and during the period of construction five new buildings were added to Main Street. It was in 1906 that the family of Ronald Reagan moved into the district, occupying the apartment on the second floor of the building at 111 Main Street. They would live in other locations in Tampico, move elsewhere, and eventually briefly return to the village and occupy another second floor apartment within the district.

Modern Main Street (Illinois Route 172) in Tampico has fewer buildings and less density than it did during the peak of its historical significance from 1871 to 1920. Fires and new construction are to blame, in part, for this situation. Despite fewer buildings, the row of commercial buildings along the east side of Main Street is illustrative of the former density of the district.

== Boundaries ==
Historically, the central business district in Tampico stretched one block, the 100 block, of Main Street, which extended from Market Street on the north to the Chicago, Burlington and Quincy tracks on the south. The boundaries of the historic district mostly overlie the traditional boundaries of the central business district. The district boundaries exclude properties that are not part of the historic period. In addition, the boundaries exclude residential properties.

The northern boundary of the historic district, near Market Street, was drawn to include the properties at 106 and 107 S. Main while excluding a lot, vacant at the time of the district's inclusion on the National Register, and a new building. The southern border was drawn along Pig Alley and designed to exclude a non-historic grain elevator near the railroad tracks.

== Architecture ==
The buildings in the Tampico Historic District all have a uniform setback, save the neo-Colonial, 1970s-era bank building. All but one of the district's buildings stand two stories, contributing to a uniform architectural rhythm and harmony. Most of the district's buildings have matching cornice lines and the two frame buildings in the historic district predate the incorporation of Tampico as a village. Land use within the district boundaries is strictly commercial and the architecture of the buildings reflect that use. The most architecturally significant structures in the district are part of an integrated, cohesive unit. Their significance is dependent upon each other, thus, the removal of any one of the buildings would reduce the integrity of the other buildings.

== Properties ==
=== Contributing structures ===
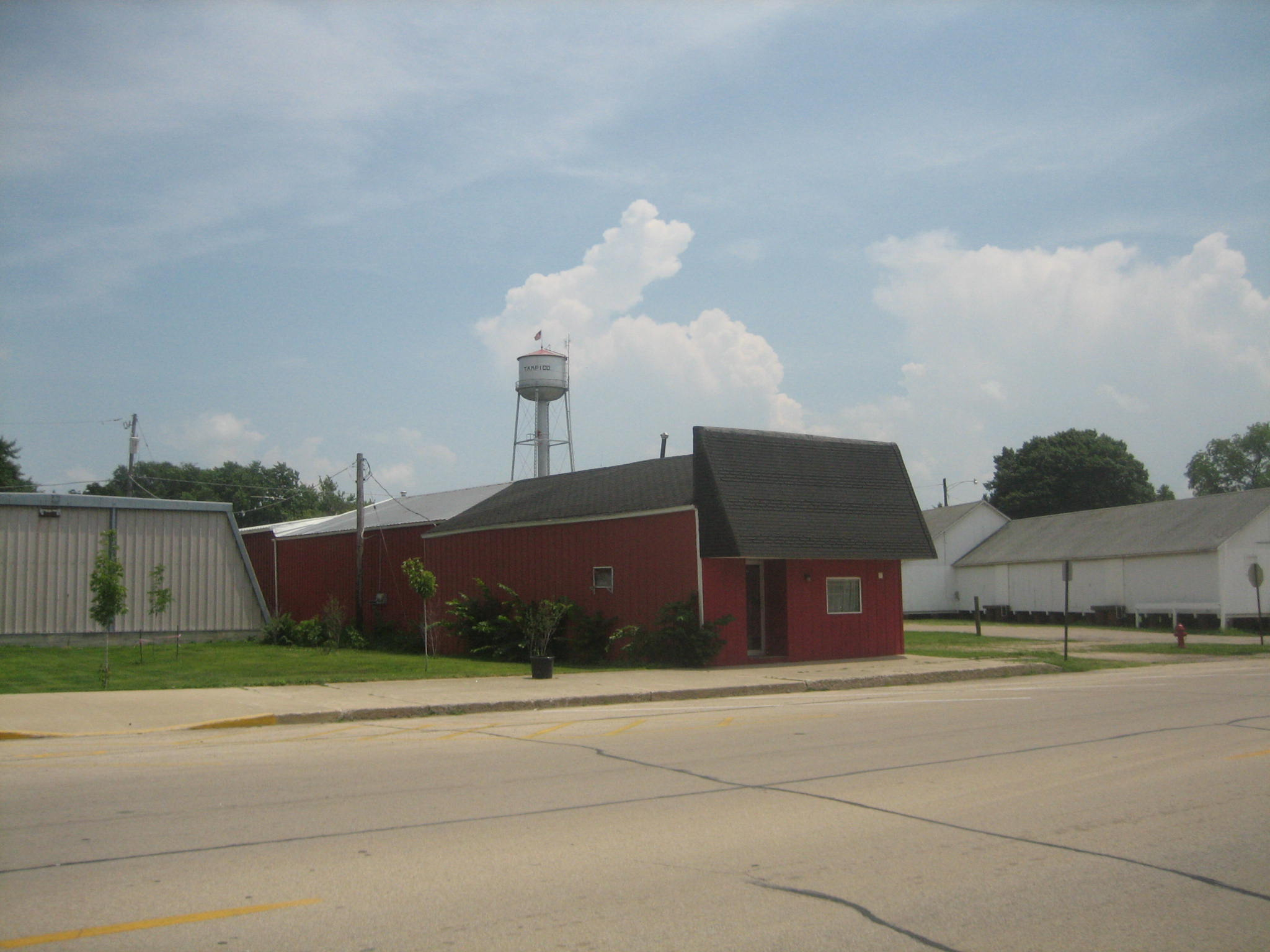
The building at 131 S. Main was built in 1873 and features an added mansard roof.

The three buildings considered contributing structures, while dating from the period of historical significance for the district, have been extensively altered. In addition, all three buildings are free-standing structures and thus, not integrated into the whole of the visual harmony found in the significant structures. The three altered buildings are located at 106, 110 and 131 South Main Street.

The building at 131 Main, on the east side of the street, was originally constructed in 1873 and formerly owned by the Glassburn Lumber and Feed company. The west facade of the building has been altered by the addition of a new storefront and a pseudo-mansard roof. The structures at 106 and 110 Main are connected by a single-story structure between them. 106 S. Main Street was constructed in 1873 and features a false-front with a parapet that hides its gable roof. The building formerly housed a millinery and a beauty shop and its front (east) facade has been significantly altered. At 110 S. Main Street is a 1905 two-story brick building originally used as a grocery store. The building, which has been used by the Masonic Lodge, has had part of its cornice removed and replaced by a shingled canopy.

=== H.C. Pitney Variety Store ===
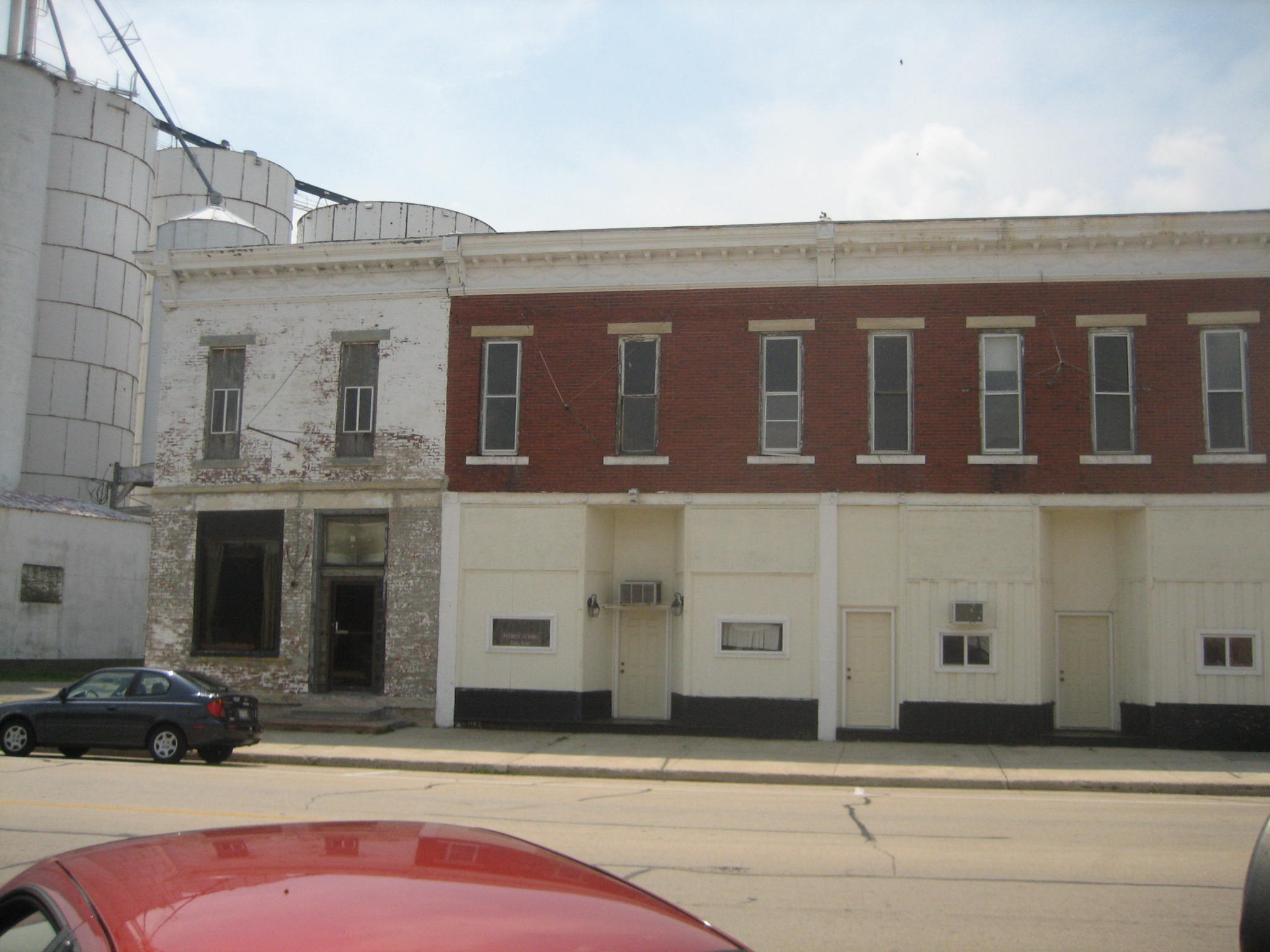
The two-storefront H.C. Pitney Variety Store is attached to the older building on its south.

The building known as the H.C. Pitney Variety Store consists of two store fronts, and was erected by Ray McKenzie in 1900. The H.C. Pitney Variety Store occupied the property, under various owners, from 1911 until 1920. H.C. Pitney owned the store from 1911 until 1914, when he sold it. During his first period of ownership, Pitney employed Jack Reagan, the father of 40th U.S. president Ronald Reagan, as a clerk. The H.C. Pitney Variety Store is most notable for its upstairs tenants from 1919 to 1920. During this period, H.C. Pitney operated the building as the H.C. Pitney Variety Store, and the second-floor apartment was occupied by the family of 40th U.S. president Ronald Reagan.

The building is part of a two-story commercial block along Main Street, and is attached to the building next to it. Of the two structures in the block the Pitney Store is the newest, the other building was built a year earlier. The two-story brick building features a metal cornice and two storefronts listed at different addressed. The first store front, at 124 Main Street is 3 bays wide and the second, at 122 Main Street, is 4 bays wide.

=== Ronald Reagan Birthplace ===
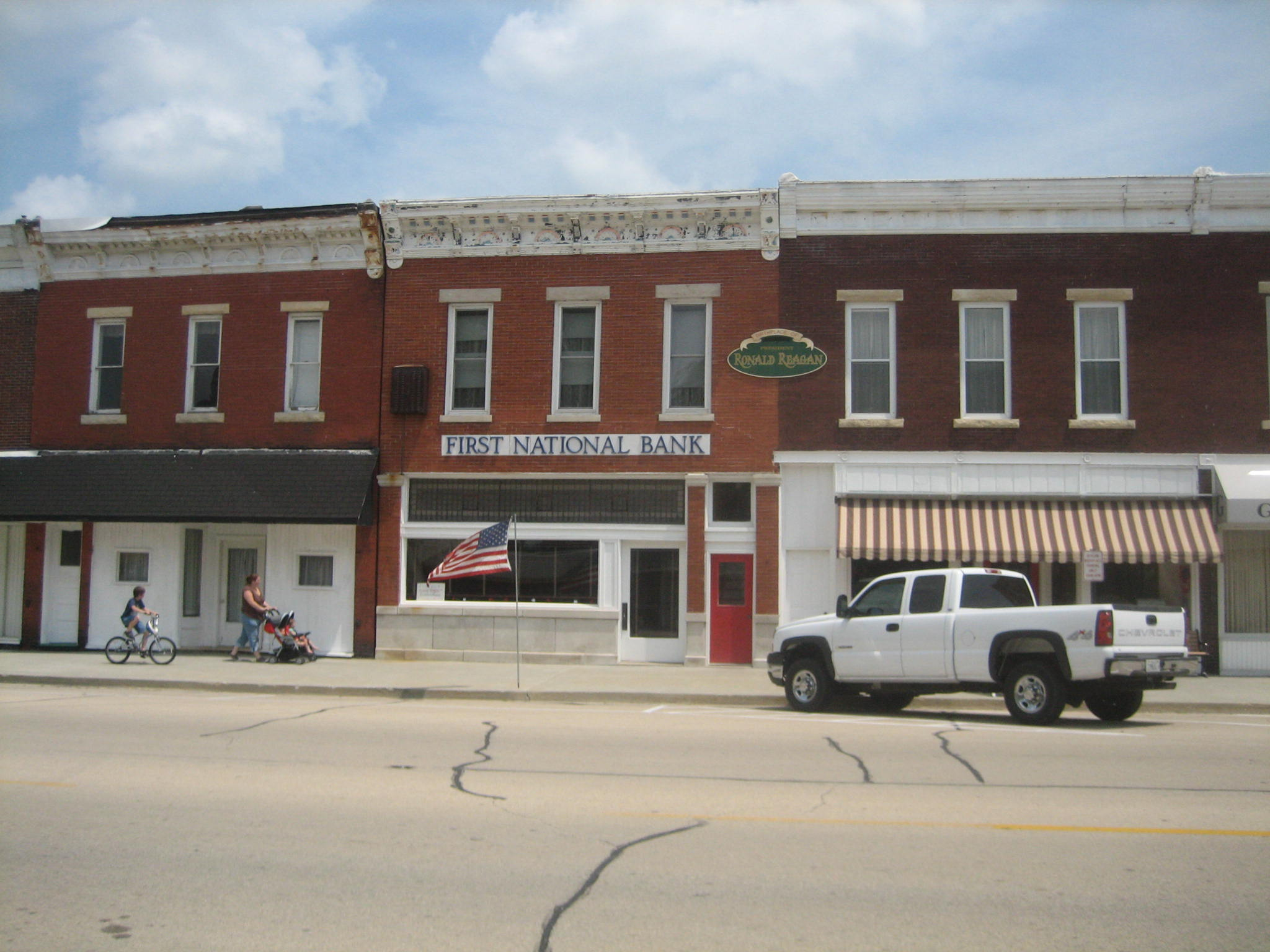
The Ronald Reagan Birthplace (center), above a restored bank building in Tampico, Illinois.

The building known as the birthplace of 40th U.S. president Ronald Reagan was constructed in 1896 for G.W. Stauffer by Fred Harvey Seymour and later became known as the Graham Building. It was built in 1896 and housed a tavern from that time until 1915. On February 6, 1911, the 40th president of the United States, Ronald Reagan, was born in the apartment above the bakery/restaurant, which later became the site of the First National Bank. The Reagans would move out of the apartment and into a house on Glassburn Street in Tampico a few months after Ronald was born.

Architecturally, the two-story brick building is similar to its neighboring buildings. It is brick, two stories tall, has three second-story windows and a cornice. Only the area's oldest buildings differ from the Reagan Birthplace's metal cornices and flat-headed windows. The building's first-floor interior has been restored as the First National Bank, which occupied the property from 1919 to 1931. On the second floor the apartment has been restored to the period when Reagan was born. The site offers tours to the public and is listed as a "significant" contributing property to the historic district.

=== Significant structures ===
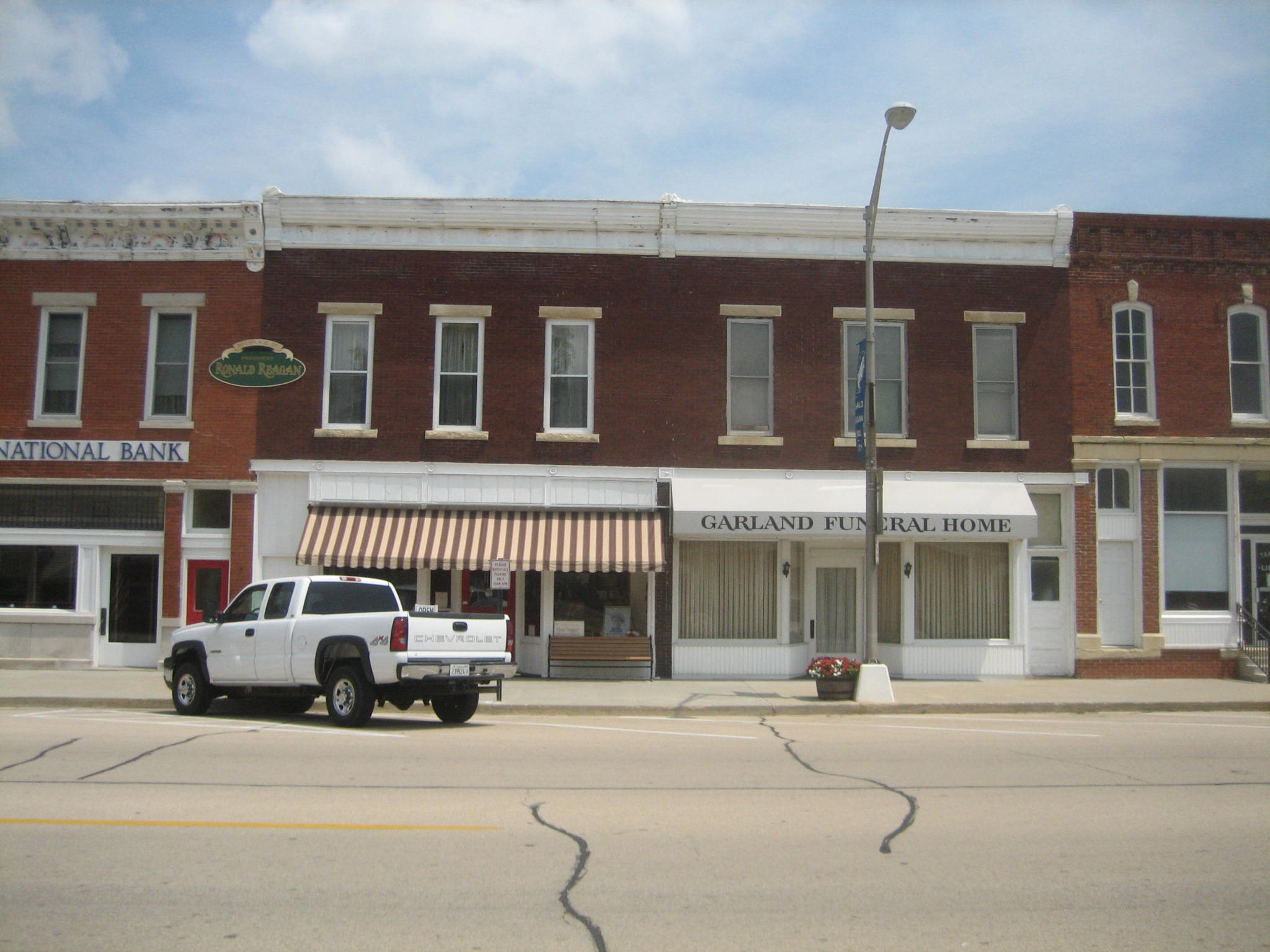
The structures at 113 and 115 Main were built simultaneously. 115 Main has been a funeral home since 1903.

The contributing properties in the Main Street Historic District are classified into two categories, "significant" and "contributing". Significant structures are those with architectural or historical distinction, 10 of the 14 buildings remaining within the district are classified as significant. The significant structures are grouped into two sets, one consists of the buildings from 107 to 119 Main Street (along the east side of the street) and the second of buildings from 122 to 126 Main Street (west side of street).

The first group of significant structures are along the east side of Main Street and addressed from 107 to 119. 107 S. Main Street was constructed for Susie Slippell in 1903 and once housed a harness shop. The next building, 109 Main, was built in 1898 by J.J Blietz, it held the Elmdorf Grocery and Meat Market. The building adjacent the former meat market is the Ronald Reagan Birthplace. 113 and 115 Main were built simultaneously in 1900, and share a wall. 113 Main is the current home to the Ronald Reagan Gift Shop and was originally constructed by Fred Seymour for use as the Seymour Grocery Store. The building at 115 was built for M.R. Lyon and has been in use as a funeral home since 1903.

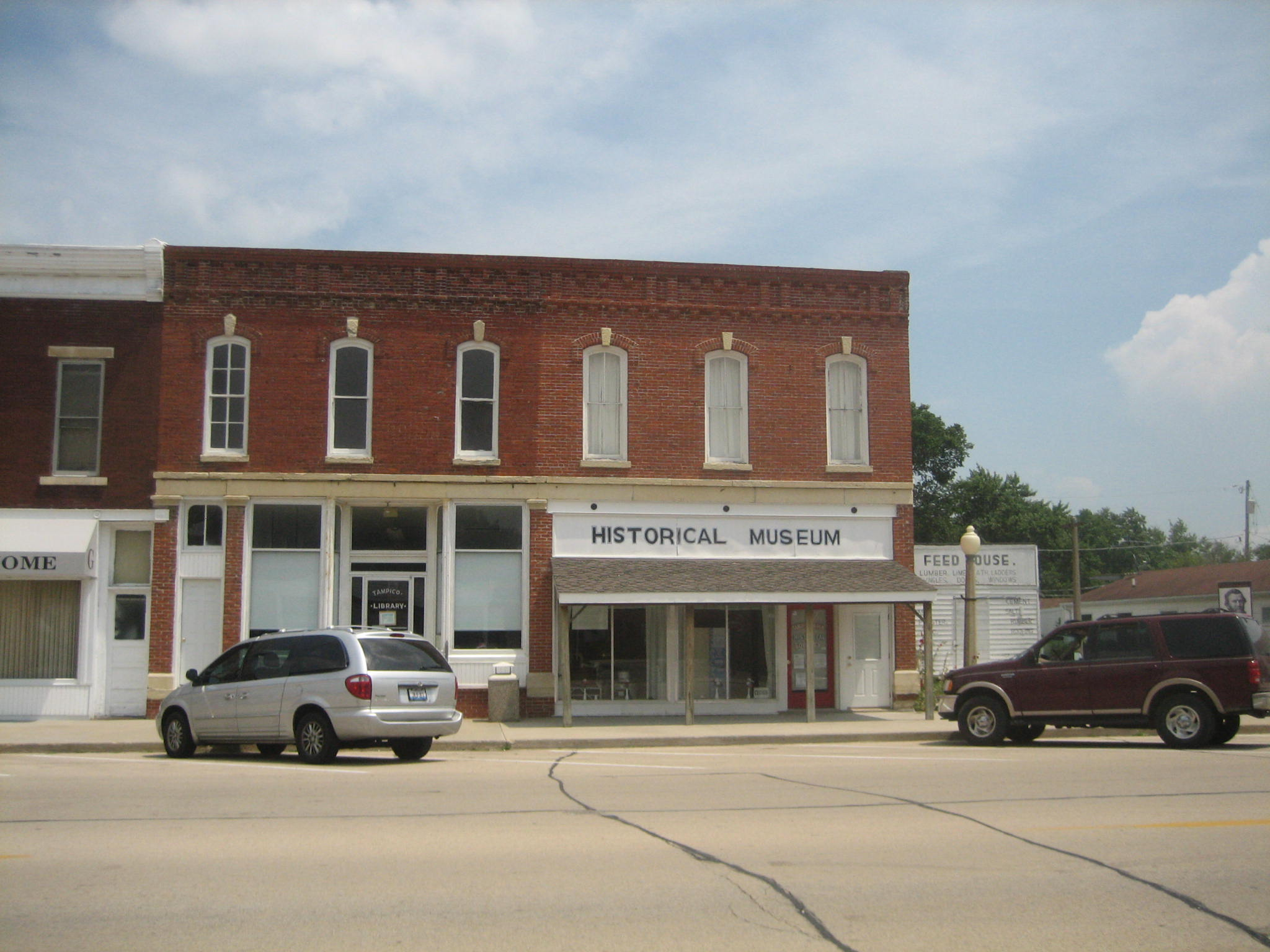
The buildings at 117 and 119 S. Main Street were constructed in 1877 following the last major fire in downtown Tampico.

The structures at 117 and 119 are the oldest brick buildings in the historic district and were built in 1877 following the last major fire. 117 Main, built for J.C. Paice, has housed a grocery store, meat market, and variety store, and retains its original cast iron storefront. The building at 119 Main was erected for Ruben Davis. It was damaged by fire in 1980 but has since been repaired.

The second group of significant structures are found on the west side of Main Street from 122 to 126. The two storefronts at 122 and 124 Main are the H.C. Pitney Variety Store. The adjacent structure was built in 1899 for A.J. Glassburn, son of town founder John Glassburn. The building housed the Tampico State Bank from 1899 to 1931 with A.J. Glassburn as its president. Glassburn also served as mayor of Tampico during three periods, 1882–1885, 1887–1893, and 1901–1902. After 1931 the building housed another bank and a lumber and hardware store.

== Significance ==
The Main Street Historic District in Tampico, Illinois is most significant in two areas. First, the district represents an intact example of a central commercial district in a rural Illinois town. Second, the birthplace of the 40th president of the United States, Ronald Reagan, is located within the district's boundaries. These reasons contributed to the historic district's listing on the U.S. National Register of Historic Places on 3 June 1982.

== See also ==
- Other Main St. Historic Districts
- Ronald Reagan Boyhood Home
- Ronald Reagan Trail
