= Neil Reagan =

Older brother of Ronald Reagan (1908–1996)

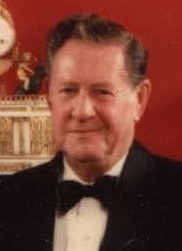
- Reagan in 1981
- Born: John Neil Reagan; September 16, 1908; Tampico, Illinois, U.S.
- Died: December 11, 1996 (aged 88); San Diego, California, U.S.
- Other name: "Moon"
- Education: Eureka College (BA)
- Political party: Republican
- Spouse: Ruth Elizabeth "Bess" Hoffman (m. 1935)
- Parents: Jack Reagan; Nelle Wilson Reagan
- Relatives: Ronald Reagan (brother)

John Neil Reagan (September 16, 1908 – December 11, 1996) was an American radio station manager, CBS senior producer, and senior vice president of McCann Erickson. He was the older brother of the Hollywood star and United States President Ronald Reagan.

== Life and career ==
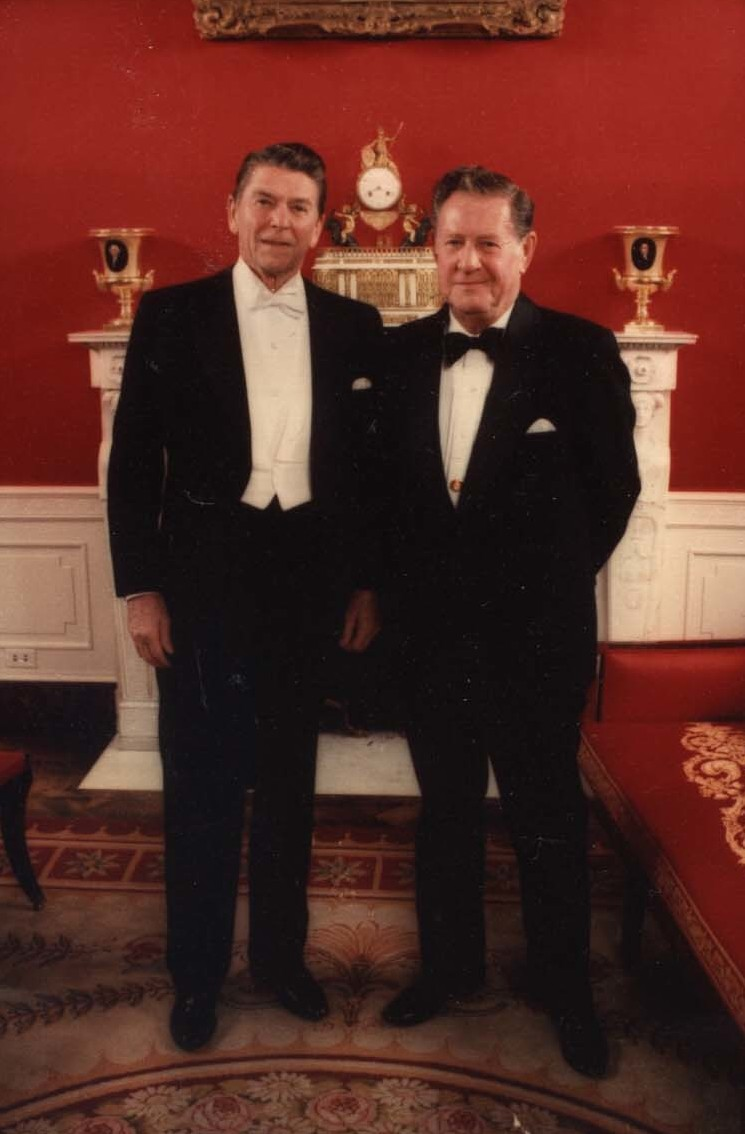
Neil at his brother's inauguration in 1981

Neil Reagan was born in Tampico on September 16, 1908. He was baptized as a Catholic, the faith of his father. As an infant, he attended his mother's church, but later became affiliated with his father's religion. His younger brother was baptized and raised in their mother's Disciples of Christ church. Neil was described as a boisterous and gregarious personality in his youth. His family and friends called him "Moon", which came from the Moon Mullins comic strip.

In 1933, Neil graduated from Eureka College with a Bachelor of Arts degree in Economics. He followed his brother to California and established a career as a television producer and advertising executive.

From the 1930s through the 1950s, Neil Reagan directed the radio series Dr. Christian, starring Jean Hersholt. In between he launched a brief Hollywood career as a supporting actor in films such as Tugboat Annie Sails Again (1940) and Doughboys in Ireland (1943). Neil Reagan directed his brother in the television series Death Valley Days.

He served as president of both the Hollywood and Los Angeles advertising clubs, and also served on numerous community and professional boards including: the Crippled Children's Society of Los Angeles, the Kennedy Child Study Center in Santa Monica, and the Natural History Museum of Los Angeles. He was an alternate delegate to the 1972 Republican National Convention from California, and a delegate to the 1980 Republican National Convention.

The Reagan Physical Education Center on the Eureka College campus was dedicated in 1970 in honor of both Ronald and Neil Reagan. Twelve years later, Ronald Reagan would return to the Reagan Center to make one of his most important foreign policy speeches of his first term known as the START speech, or Eureka speech. Reagan died from heart failure at a hospital in San Diego on December 11, 1996, at age 88. He is buried in Des Moines, Iowa, at Highland Memorial Gardens Cemetery.

== Family ==
His wife, Ruth Elizabeth "Bess" Reagan (née Hoffman; 1908–2010), whom he wed in 1935, died in 2010 at the age of 102.

== Selected filmography ==
- Doughboys in Ireland (1943)

== Bibliography ==
- Harmer, John, Reagan: Man of Principle, Cedar Fort, 2002, ISBN 1-55517-619-4
- Watson, Robert W., White House Studies Compendium, Volume 1, Nova Publishers, 2007, ISBN 1-60021-521-1
- Yager, Edward M., Ronald Reagan's Journey: Democrat to Republican, Rowman & Littlefield, 2006, ISBN 0-7425-4421-4
