= Tampico, Illinois =

Tampico
- Village
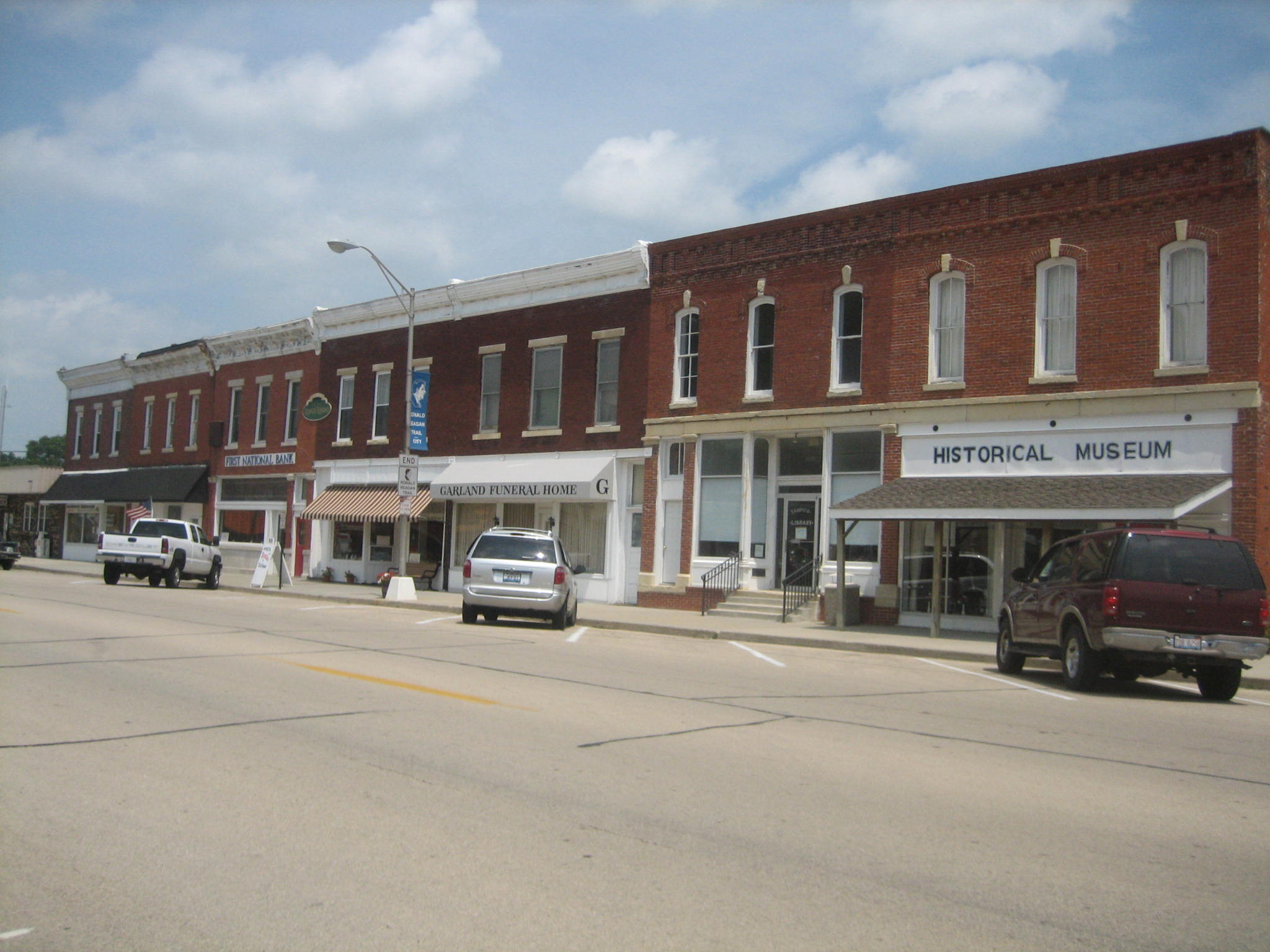
- The Main Street Historic District in downtown Tampico

- Location of Tampico in Whiteside County, Illinois
- Coordinates: 41°37′40″N 89°47′08″W
- Country: United States
- State: Illinois
- County: Whiteside
- Township: Tampico
- Founded: 1875

Area
  - Total: 0.39 sq mi (1.02 km^{2})
  - Land: 0.39 sq mi (1.02 km^{2})
  - Water: 0 sq mi (0.00 km^{2})
- Elevation: 640 ft (200 m)

Population (2020)
  - Total: 689
  - Density: 1,749.3/sq mi (675.39/km^{2})
- Time zone: UTC-6 (CST)
  - Summer (DST): UTC-5 (CDT)
- ZIP code: 61283
- Area codes: 815, 779
- FIPS code: 17-74470
- GNIS feature ID: 2399952
- Website: www.tampicoil.com

Tampico (/ˈtæmpɪkoʊ/) is a village located in Tampico Township, Whiteside County, Illinois, United States next to Rock Falls and Sterling, Illinois. As of the 2020 census, Tampico had a population of 689. It is known as the birthplace of Ronald Reagan, the 40th President of the United States.

== History ==
The area containing the future Tampico township was a slough. The first European settlers arrived in 1852. The township of Tampico was established in 1861. John W. Glassburn was the founder of Tampico. In 1863–64, the area was drained. The local railroad CB&Q went into service in 1871 and was taken out in the early 1980s. In June 1874, a tornado struck, destroying 27 buildings. In 1875, the village of Tampico was incorporated.

== Geography ==
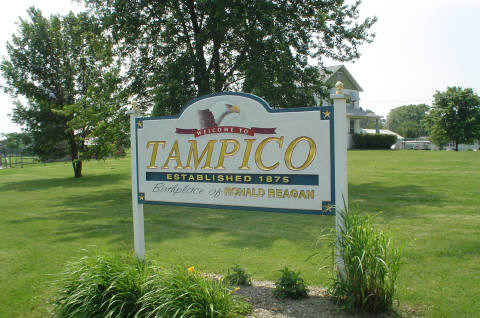
Welcome sign

According to the 2010 census, Tampico has a total area of 0.39 square miles (1.01 km^{2}), all land.

Approximately 1 mi (1.6 km) east of Tampico is the Hennepin Canal feeder. Tampico is located approximately 40 mi (64 km) east-northeast of Moline and approximately 110 mi (180 km) west of Chicago.

== Demographics ==
Historical population
| Census | Pop. | Note | %± |
|---|---|---|---|
| 1880 | 424 | | — |
| 1890 | 429 | | 1.2% |
| 1900 | 807 | | 88.1% |
| 1910 | 849 | | 5.2% |
| 1920 | 788 | | −7.2% |
| 1930 | 693 | | −12.1% |
| 1940 | 727 | | 4.9% |
| 1950 | 760 | | 4.5% |
| 1960 | 790 | | 3.9% |
| 1970 | 838 | | 6.1% |
| 1980 | 966 | | 15.3% |
| 1990 | 833 | | −13.8% |
| 2000 | 772 | | −7.3% |
| 2010 | 790 | | 2.3% |
| 2020 | 689 | | −12.8% |
U.S. Decennial Census

At the 2000 census there were 772 people, 292 households, and 205 families in the village. The population density was 1,941.3 inhabitants per square mile (749.5/km^{2}). There were 315 housing units at an average density of 792.1 per square mile (305.8/km^{2}). The racial makeup of the village was 99.74% White, 0.00% Black, 0.00% Native American, 0.00% Asian, 0.00% Pacific Islander, 0.13% from other races, and 0.13% from two or more races. 1.55% of the population were Hispanic or Latino of any race.

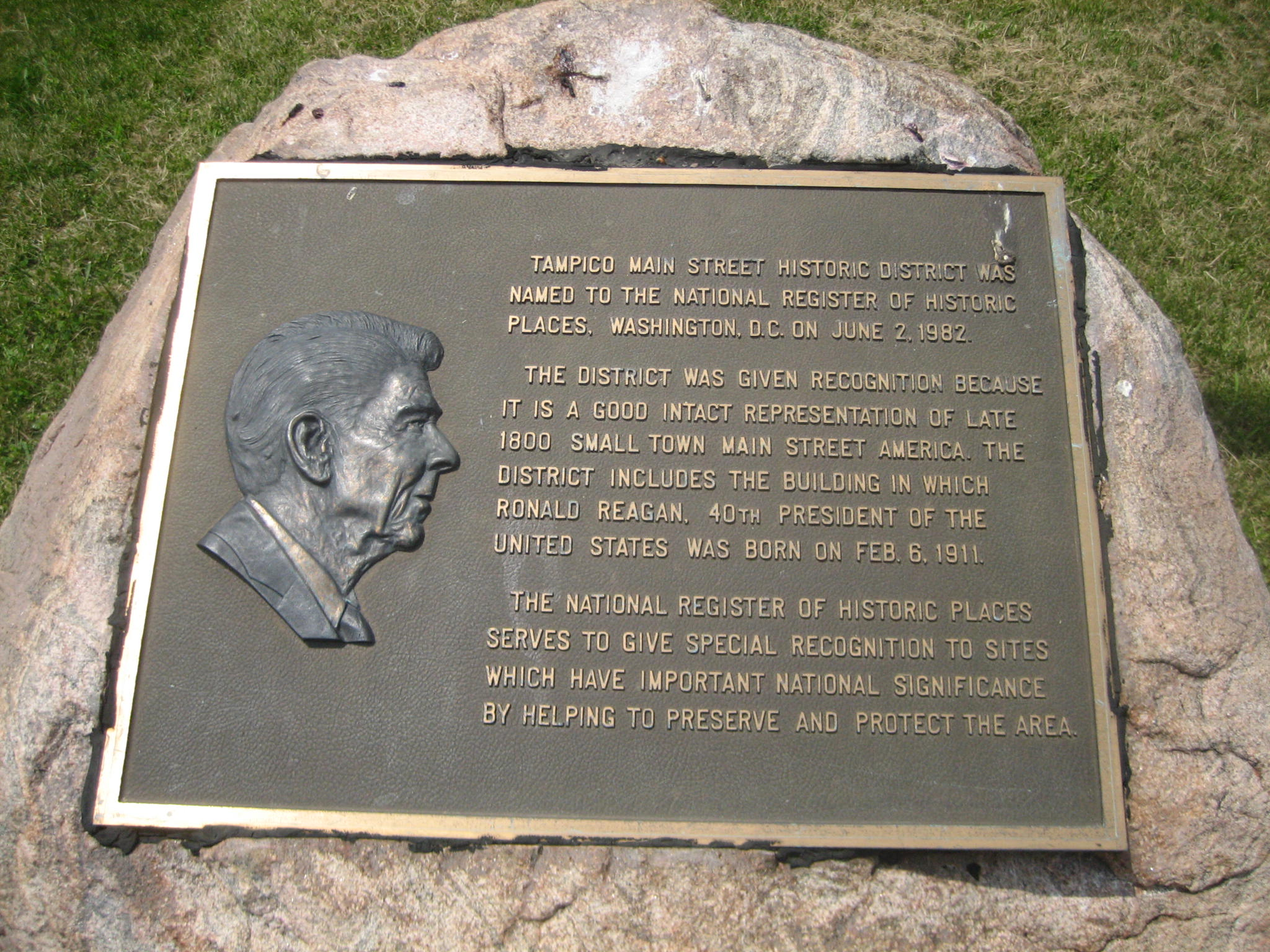
National Register of Historic Places plaque

There were 292 households, 33.2% had children under the age of 18 living with them, 57.2% were married couples living together, 9.2% had a female householder with no husband present, and 29.5% were non-families. 24.7% of households were one person and 13.0% were one person aged 65 or older. The average household size was 2.64 and the average family size was 3.10.

The age distribution was 28.9% under the age of 18, 7.9% from 18 to 24, 26.2% from 25 to 44, 23.6% from 45 to 64, and 13.5% 65 or older. The median age was 36 years. For every 100 females, there were 102.1 males. For every 100 females age 18 and over, there were 102.6 males.

The median household income was $40,221 and the median family income is $43,646. Males had a median income of $30,667 versus $18,409 for females. The per capita income for the village was $14,467. 8.5% of the population and 6.4% of families were below the poverty line. Out of the total population, 10.2% of those under the age of 18 and 4.6% of those 65 and older were living below the poverty line.

== Education ==
Prophetstown-Lyndon-Tampico Community Unit School District 3 is the public school district. Tampico Elementary School is in Tampico. Secondary students go to the 6-12 Campus in Prophetstown.

There was previously a Tampico Township High School District 302, which operated a high school. There was a separate Tampico Grade School. The Tampico Community Unit School District 4 had formed around 1970. In the 1980s the schools were Tampico Elementary School, Tampico Junior High School, and Tampico High School. In 1986, the Tampico district's schools had test results higher than the averages of the public schools in Illinois. The Tampico school district school board had seats for residents of Tampico township and residents of other townships.

On August 7, 1996, the Prophetstown-Lyndon Community Unit School District 3 annexed the Tampico district. The consolidated district previously operated a Tampico Middle School.

== Notable people ==
- Hazel A. McCaskrin, Illinois state legislator; born in Tampico
- Ronald Reagan, 40th President of the United States; born in Tampico
- Joseph M. Reeves, U.S. Navy Admiral and veteran of the Spanish–American War, World War I and World War II, born in Tampico

== See also ==
- Birthplace of Ronald Reagan
- H. C. Pitney Variety Store Building
- Tampico Main Street Historic District
