= List of honorary British knights and dames =

Many people have been created honorary knights or dames by the British crown. There are also those that have been appointed to two comparable orders, the Order of Merit and the Order of the Companions of Honour, and those that have had conferred on them the decoration of the Royal Victorian Chain; none of these carries pre-nominal styles.

== Honorary awards ==
=== Use of pre-nominal styles and post-nominal initials ===
An honorary award is one made to a person who is not a citizen of a Commonwealth realm. He or she cannot use the pre-nominal style of 'Sir' or 'Dame', but can use the post-nominal letters, subject to the prevailing conventions in his or her own country. If such a person later acquires citizenship of a Commonwealth realm, then any honorary awards usually become substantive, and in the case of knights and dames they can begin to use the pre-nominal styles. However, this is not automatic. The person must be dubbed by the King or his delegate in order to be entitled to use the pre-nominal style. If the knighthood is in an order which has a special class for honorary knighthoods, a change to a regular class of knighthoods is also required.

=== Loss of citizenship of a British realm ===
Citizens of a country which was a full part of the British Empire or Commonwealth when they received the honour (i.e. who were British subjects at the time), were substantive knights or dames, not honorary. The knighthood does not become honorary, and the person may choose to use his or her title(s), after their country becomes a republic. Citizens of British protectorates and mandated territories usually received honorary awards. Notable exceptions were rulers of the Indian princely states and their subjects, who were de jure British protected persons and not British subjects, but who received substantive knighthoods.

=== Annulment and restoration ===
In certain circumstances, an honorary award may be annulled (i.e. revoked). The effect is that, officially, the person is considered never to have been given the award, their name is erased from the order's register, and they are required to return all insignia. This happens when the Sovereign issues a signed and sealed ordinance cancelling and annulling the appointment. This is not common and in practice only occurs where the recipient has engaged in serious detrimental activities, e.g. following a conviction for serious crimes, or for hostile acts against the United Kingdom. In even rarer circumstances, an annulled award may later be restored by the Sovereign. Details of known annulments and restorations are annotated in the table below.

=== Order of the Garter terminology ===
The Order of the Garter uses terminology different from that of most other British orders. 'Stranger/Extra Knights Companion of the Garter' and 'Stranger/Extra Ladies Companion of the Order of the Garter' are the equivalent of 'Honorary Knights' and 'Honorary Dames' in other orders. As with other orders, the pre-nominal styles 'Sir' and 'Lady' are not used by Extra Knights and Extra Ladies. Revoked appointments are said to be 'degraded' rather than 'annulled'; the effect, however, is the same.

== Arts and entertainment ==
List of honorary British Knights and Dames
Name	Nationality	Honour	Year	Category	Notes
Daniel Barenboim	Argentina / Israel	KBE	2011	Arts/entertainment	Pianist and conductor
Jorge Luis Borges	Argentina	KBE	1964	Arts/entertainment	Poet and writer
Alfred Brendel	Austria	KBE	1989	Arts/entertainment	Pianist
Julien Cain	France	KBE	1952	Arts/entertainment	Administrator-general of the Bibliothèque nationale de France for services to British cultural issues. see also fr:Julien Cain
Ralf Dahrendorf	Germany	KBE	1982	Arts/entertainment	Became a British national in 1988
Christian Conrad Sophus, Count Danneskiold-Samsøe	Denmark	KCVO	1904	Arts/entertainment	
Anna Morpurgo Davies	Italy (Note: According to a short biography at Oxford University, Anna Morpurgo Davies was born and educated in Italy.)	DBE	2000	Arts/entertainment	
Plácido Domingo	Spain	KBE	2002	Arts/entertainment	Opera singer; awarded for contributions to music and charity work
Antal Doráti	Hungary	KBE	1983	Arts/entertainment	
Maurice Druon	France	KBE	1999	Arts/entertainment	Previously appointed Honorary CBE in 1988.
Douglas Fairbanks Jr.	United States	KBE	1949	Arts/entertainment	In recognition of his work on behalf of Anglo-American amity, particularly as chairman in the United States of the Cooperative for American Remittances to Europe.
Naum Gabo	Soviet Union	KBE	1973	Arts/entertainment	
Mark Getty	United States	KBE	2015	Arts/entertainment	
Bernard Haitink	Netherlands	CH	2002	Arts/entertainment	Musical director of the Royal Opera House
Bernard Haitink	Netherlands	KBE	1977	Arts/entertainment	Principal Conductor, London Philharmonic Orchestra for his enormous contribution to the artistic life of this country
Bob Hope	United States	KBE	1998	Arts/entertainment	Entertainer, for contribution to Anglo-American friendship He had lost British nationality in 1920. (Note: British nationality was automatically lost by naturalisation in a non-Commonwealth country (in this case the United States) prior to 1 January 1949; see History of British nationality law)
Bob Iger	United States	KBE	2022	Arts/entertainment	Former Chairman & Chief Executive Officer, Disney Company; awarded "for services to the UK/US relations."
Magnus Magnusson	Iceland	KBE	1989	Arts/entertainment	
Ferdinand Meldahl	Denmark	GCVO	1904	Arts/entertainment	Chamberlain to the King of Denmark and Vice President of the Royal Academy of Arts, Copenhagen.
Yehudi Menuhin	United States/ Switzerland	KBE	1965	Arts/entertainment	Became a British national in 1985. Appointed a substantive Member of the Order of Merit in 1987.
Spike Milligan	Ireland	KBE	2001	Arts/entertainment	Comedian, awarded for services to entertainment
Ettore Modigliani	Italy	KBE	1930	Arts/entertainment	
Arnaldo Momigliano	Italy	KBE	1974	Arts/entertainment	
Ann Murray	Ireland	DBE	2002	Arts/entertainment	For services to music. (Note: This is the Irish mezzo-soprano Ann Murray, not the Canadian popular singer Anne Murray)
Riccardo Muti	Italy	KBE	2000	Arts/entertainment	
Eugene Ormandy	United States	KBE	1976	Arts/entertainment	Conductor of the Philadelphia Orchestra, for contribution to Anglo-American friendship
Ignacy Jan Paderewski	Poland	GBE	1925	Politics/government; Arts/Entertainment	
Roberto Paribeni	Italy	KBE	1930	Arts/entertainment	
Murray Perahia	United States	KBE	2004	Arts/entertainment	Pianist, awarded for his services to music
Libor Pešek	Czech Republic	KBE	1996	Arts/entertainment	
Sidney Poitier	Bahamas/United States	KBE	1974	Arts/entertainment	Actor, director, activist and ambassador.
Mario Praz	Italy	KBE	1962	Arts/entertainment	
André Previn	United States	KBE	1996	Arts/entertainment	
Mstislav Rostropovich	United States	KBE	1987	Arts/entertainment	In 1990 he regained Russian citizenship, and held dual US/Russian citizenship.
Arthur Rubinstein	United States	KBE	1977	Arts/entertainment	
Esa-Pekka Salonen	Finland	KBE	2020	Arts/entertainment	Conductor and composer, awarded for services to music and UK-Finland relations.
Ravi Shankar	India	KBE	2001	Arts/entertainment	
Georg Solti	Germany	KBE	1971	Arts/entertainment	Musical Director, Covent Garden Opera Company Became a British national in 1972 and knighthood became substantive.
Kevin Spacey	United States	KBE	2015	Arts/entertainment	Previously appointed Honorary CBE in 2010.
Steven Spielberg	United States	KBE	2001	Arts/entertainment	Award-winning director credited with "doubling of cinema admission in the UK since the early 1980s"
William Trevor	Ireland	KBE	2002	Arts/entertainment	Previously appointed Honorary CBE in 1977.
John Williams	United States	KBE	2022	Arts/entertainment	Conductor, composer, and pianist; awarded for "services to film music"
Terry Wogan	Ireland	KBE	2005	Arts/entertainment	Took British nationality in 2005 and knighthood became substantive. Held dual British/Irish citizenship.
James Wolfensohn	United States/Australia	KBE	1995	Arts/entertainment	Born an Australian citizen, but relinquished this when he became an American citizen in 1980. (Note: Australian citizenship was in general automatically lost by adult naturalisation in another country before 4 April 2002) In 2010, he regained his Australian citizenship.
Franco Zeffirelli	Italy	KBE	2004	Arts/entertainment	Stage and screen director; awarded for his "valuable services to British performing arts"

== Politics and government ==
List of honorary British Knights and Dames
Name	Nationality	Honour	Year	Category	Notes
Ali Abu Al-Ragheb	Jordan	GCMG	2001	Politics/government	Prime Minister of Jordan
Valdas Adamkus	Lithuania	GCB	2006	Politics/government	President of Lithuania
Martti Ahtisaari	Finland	GCB	1995	Politics/government	President of Finland
Prince Bola Ajibola	Nigeria	KBE	1989	Politics/government	Attorney-General and Minister of Justice of Nigeria, 1985–1991
Alhaji Abubakar Alhaji	Nigeria	KBE	1989	Politics/government	Minister of Budget and Planning of Nigeria, 1988–1990
Jacobo Fitz-James Stuart y Falcó, 17th Duke of Alba de Tormes	Spain	GCVO	1902	Politics/government	
Giuliano Amato	Italy	GCMG	2000	Politics/government	Prime Minister of Italy
Emeka Anyaoku	Nigeria	GCVO	2000	Politics/government	
Count d'Arnoso	Portugal	KCVO	tbd	Politics/government	Private Secretary to the King of Portugal. Subsequently, promoted GCVO in 1903. see pt:Bernardo Pinheiro Correia de Melo
Count d'Arnoso	Portugal	GCVO	1903	Politics/government	Private Secretary to the King of Portugal.
Franz Joseph von Auersperg	Austria	GCVO	1904	Politics/government	Privy Councillor and Chamberlain to The Emperor of Austria, King of Hungary.
Joseph Avenol	France	KBE	1921	Politics/government	
Antonio Jose d'Avila	Portugal	KCVO	1903	Politics/government	Lord Mayor of Lisbon
Ayub Khan	Pakistan	RVC	tbd	Politics/government	
Ayub Khan	Pakistan	GCMG	1960	Politics/government	(Field Marshal) President of Pakistan
Ibrahim Babangida	Nigeria	GCB	1989	Politics/government	President of Nigeria
Hastings Banda	Malawi	GCB	1985	Politics/government	President of Malawi
Miguel Barbosa Huerta	Mexico	KBE	2015	Politics/government	
August Graf Bellegarde	Austria-Hungary	KCVO	1903	Politics/government	Master of the Household to the Emperor of Austria, King of Hungary.
Alexis, Prince of Bentheim and Steinfurt	German Empire	GCVO	1904	Politics/government	On the occasion of royal wedding of Prince Alexander of Teck and Princess Alice of Albany
Hermann Baron von Bilfinger	Württemberg	GCVO	1904	Politics/government	General Aide-de-Camp to His Majesty the King of Württemberg On the occasion of royal wedding of Prince Alexander of Teck and Princess Alice of Albany
Anatol, Count Biogot de Saint-Quentin	Austria-Hungary	GCVO	1904	Politics/government	Major General Anatol was Comptroller to the Emperor of Austria, King of Hungary.
Robert, Count de Bourboulon	Bulgaria	GCVO	1905	Politics/government	Lord Chamberlain to the Prince of Bulgaria
Henri, Marquis de Breteuil	France	KCVO	1904	Politics/government	
George H. W. Bush	United States	GCB	1993	Politics/government	President of the United States
Felipe Calderón	Mexico	GCB	2009	Politics/government	President of Mexico
Fernando Henrique Cardoso	Brazil	GCB	1997	Politics/government	President of Brazil
Nicolae Ceauşescu	Romania	GCB	1978	Politics/government	Annulled 1989
Anson Chan	China	GCMG	2002	Politics/government	(Note: British Dependent Territories citizens solely connected with Hong Kong by birth, descent or naturalisation lost that status on 30 June 1997 if a citizen of another country, including China. This provision applied to most ethnic Chinese British nationals in Hong Kong. Those who wished to do so were allowed to retain British nationality by registering for British National (Overseas) status by 1997, but this was optional. See British nationality law and Hong Kong. Those former British Dependent Territories citizens who have acquired British National (Overseas) status remain eligible for substantive knighthoods. In all other cases a knighthood awarded on or after 1 July 1997 is honorary if the recipient is not otherwise a British national or citizen of another Commonwealth realm.)
Chentung Liang-Cheng	China	KCMG	1897	Politics/government	
Chentung Liang-Cheng	China	KCVO	1909	Politics/government	
Cherif Pasha	Egypt	GCSI	1878	Politics/government	
Claude Cheysson	France	GCMG		Politics/government	
Jacques Chirac	France	GCB	1996	Politics/government	President of France
Eduard Graf Choloniewski Myszka	Austria	KCVO	1903	Politics/government	Master of the Ceremonies to the Emperor of Austria, King of Hungary
Emilio Chuayffet	Mexico	KBE	2015	Politics/government	
Carlo Azeglio Ciampi	Italy	GCB	2000	Politics/government	President of Italy
Włodzimierz Cimoszewicz	Poland	GCMG	2004	Politics/government	Prime Minister of Poland
Marie Louise Coleiro Preca	Malta	GCMG	2015	Politics/government	President of Malta
Prospero Colonna (politician)	Italy	GCVO	1903	Politics/government	(Prince of Sonnino) Syndic of Rome
Abel Combarieu	France	GCVO	1903	Politics/government	Secretary General and Chief of the Household of the President of France
Émile Combes	France	GCVO	1903	Politics/government	President of the Council
Emil Constantinescu	Romania	GCMG	2000	Politics/government	President of Romania
Francesco Cossiga	Italy	GCB	1990	Politics/government	President of Italy
Artur da Costa e Silva	Brazil	GCB	1968	Politics/government	President of Brazil
René Coty	France	GCB	1957	Politics/government	President of France
Charles, Count Coudenhove	Austria-Hungary	GCVO	1904	Politics/government	Governor of Bohemia
Philippe Crozier	France	KCVO	1898	Politics/government	
Christian Frederik, Count Danneskjold-Samsöe	Denmark	GCVO	1904	Politics/government	
Théophile Delcassé	France	GCVO	1903	Politics/government	Minister of Foreign Affairs
Johan Deuntzer	Denmark	GCVO	1904	Politics/government	
Alphonse Deville	France	GCVO	1903	Politics/government	President of the Municipal Council
Porfirio Díaz	Mexico	GCB	1906	Politics/government	President of Mexico
Lamberto Dini	Italy	GCMG	2000	Politics/government	Prime Minister of Italy
Willem Drees	Netherlands	GCMG		Politics/government	
Luis Echeverría	Mexico	GCB	1973	Politics/government	President of Mexico
António Ramalho Eanes	Portugal	GCB	1978	Politics/government	President of Portugal
António Ramalho Eanes	Portugal	RVC	1985	Politics/government	President of Portugal
Dwight D. Eisenhower	United States	GCB	1957	Politics/government	President of the United States
Gustavus Ernest of Erbach-Schönberg	Württemberg	KCVO	1898	Politics/government	
Gustavus Ernest of Erbach-Schönberg	Württemberg	GCVO	1900	Politics/government	
Walter Asmus Charles Frederick Eberhard, Baron von Esebeck	German Empire	KCVO	1909	Politics/government	Deputy Master of the Horse to the German Emperor, King of Prussia.
Mustafa Fahmi	Egypt	GCMG	1898	Politics/government	Prime Minister of Egypt
Luiz Coutinho Borges de Medeiros, Marquis of Fayal	Portugal	GCVO	1909	Politics/government	Lord in Waiting
Tassilo, Count Festétics de Tolna	tbd	GCVO	1904	Politics/government	
Antonio, Count of Figueiro	tbd	GCVO	1905	Politics/government	
Gianfranco Fini	Italy	GCMG	2005	Politics/government	Deputy Prime Minister of Italy
Tom Foley	United States	KBE	1995	Politics/government	Speaker of the House of Representatives
Vicente Fox	Mexico	GCMG	2002	Politics/government	President of Mexico
Eduardo Frei Montalva	Chile	GCB	1965	Politics/government	President of Chile
Arturo Frondizi	Argentina	GCMG	1960	Politics/government	President of Argentina
Alberto Fujimori	Peru	GCMG	1998	Politics/government	President of Peru
Eduardo Galhardo	Portugal	KCIE	1901	Politics/government	Governor-General of Portuguese India
Count Romeo Gallenga-Stuart	Italy	KBE	tbd	Politics/government	Under-Secretary for Press and Propaganda, for fostering good relations between Italy and Great Britain.
Joachim Gauck	Germany	GCB	2015	Politics/government	President of Germany
Maumoon Abdul Gayoom	Maldives	GCMG	2000	Politics/government	
Count Cesare Gianotti	Italy	GCVO	1903	Politics/government	Master of the Household to the King of Italy
Valéry Giscard d'Estaing	France	GCB	1976	Politics/government	President of France
Ernesto Geisel	Brazil	GCB	1976	Politics/government	President of Brazil
Rudolph W. Giuliani	United States	KBE	2002	Politics/government	Federal prosecutor; two-term Mayor of New York City.
Balbino Giuliano	Italy	GBE	1930	Politics/government	Minister of Public Education
Diego Gómez Pickering	Mexico	KCVO	2015	Politics/government	
Árpád Göncz	Hungary	KCMG	1991	Politics/government	President of Hungary
Árpád Göncz	Hungary	GCB	1999	Politics/government	President of Hungary
Agenor Graf Goluchowski von Goluchowo	Austria-Hungary	GCVO	1903	Politics/government	Minister of the Imperial and Royal House and Minister for Foreign Affairs
Alan Greenspan	United States	KBE	2002	Politics/government	Chairman of the Federal Reserve
Giovanni Gronchi	Italy	GCB	1961	Politics/government	President of Italy
Ildefonso Guajardo Villarreal	Mexico	KBE	2015	Politics/government	
Juan José Guerra Abud	Mexico	KBE	2015	Politics/government	
Leopold Baron von Gudenus	Austria-Hungary	KCVO	1903	Politics/government	Oberjagermeister to the Emperor of Austria, King of Hungary
Abdullah Gül	Turkey	GCB	2008	Politics/government	President of Turkey
Xanana Gusmão	East Timor	GCMG	2003	Politics/government	3rd President of East Timor
John Ritter von Habrda	Austria-Hungary	KCVO	1904	Politics/government	Commissioner of Police, Vienna
Han Seung-soo	South Korea	KBE	2004	Politics/government	
Václav Havel	Czech Republic	GCB	1996	Politics/government	
Gustav Heinemann	West Germany	GCB	1972	Politics/government	President of West Germany
Count Basil Hendrikov	tbd	GCVO	1909	Politics/government	
Roman Herzog	Germany	GCB	1998	Politics/government	President of Germany
Sassoon Effendi Heskail	Iraq	KBE	tbd	Politics/government	Minister of Finance
Harri Holkeri	Finland	KBE	1999	Politics/government	
François Hollande	France	GCB	2014	Politics/government	President of France
Mohammed Ikramullah	Pakistan	KCMG	1961	Politics/government	
Toomas Hendrik Ilves	Estonia	GCB	2006	Politics/government	President of Estonia
Ito Yukichi	Japan	KCVO	1905	Politics/government	
Dato Onn Bin Jaafar	Malaya	KBE	1953	Politics/government	Member for Home Affairs, Federation of Malaya
Muhammad Hasan Jan	tbd	GCVO	tbd	Politics/government	
Martin Baron von Jenisch	tbd	GCVO	1908	Politics/government	
Pedro Joaquín Coldwell	Mexico	KBE	2015	Politics/government	
Bhim Shumsher Jang Bahadur Rana	Nepal	KCVO	tbd	Politics/government	
Bhim Shumsher Jang Bahadur Rana	Nepal	KCSI	1917	Politics/government	Subsequently, promoted GCSI in 1931.
Bhim Shumsher Jang Bahadur Rana	Nepal	GCSI	1931	Politics/government	
Juddha Shumsher Jang Bahadur Rana	Nepal	KCIE	1917	Politics/government	Subsequently, promoted GCIE.
Juddha Shumsher Jang Bahadur Rana	Nepal	GCIE	tbd	Politics/government	
Juddha Shumsher Jang Bahadur Rana	Nepal	GCSI	1935	Politics/government	
Franz Jonas	Austria	GCB	1969	Politics/government	President of Austria
Kang Young-Hoon	South Korea	KBE	1995	Politics/government	
Kajetan von Kapos-Mére	Austria-Hungary	KCVO	1903	Politics/government	Second Under Secretary of State for Foreign Affairs, Vienna
Hamid Karzai	Afghanistan	GCMG	2003	Politics/government	
Aberra Kassa (Dejazmatch)	Ethiopia	KBE	1932	Politics/government	Son of Ras Kassa Hailu, handed over to the Italians (by Ras Hailu Tekle Haymanot of Gojjam), who shot him & his brother dead immediately after capture.
Urho Kekkonen	Finland	GCB	1969	Politics/government	President of Finland
Edward Kennedy	United States	KBE	2009	Politics/government	U.S. Senator from Massachusetts
John Kerry	United States	KCMG	2025	Politics/government	U.S. Senator from Massachusetts and Secretary of State
Erich Graf Kielmansegg	Austria-Hungary	KCVO	1903	Politics/government	Governor of Lower Austria. Subsequently, promoted GCVO in 1904.
Erich Graf Kielmansegg	Austria-Hungary	GCVO	1904	Politics/government	Governor of Lower Austria
Kim Dae-jung	South Korea	GCB	1999	Politics/government	President of South Korea on the occasion of a royal visit to South Korea.
Kim Dae-jung	South Korea	GCMG	tbd	Politics/government	
Helmut Kohl	Germany	GCMG	tbd	Politics/government	
Horst Köhler	Germany	GCB	2004	Politics/government	President of Germany
Martin Charles Augustus Kirschner	German Empire	KCVO	1909	Politics/government	Chief Burgomaster of Berlin
Julius Benedictus, Count Krag Juel Vind Frijs	Denmark	KCVO	1904	Politics/government	Promoted from CVO.
Magens Christian, Count Krag Juel Vind Frijs	Denmark	KCVO	1904	Politics/government	
Juscelino Kubitschek	Brazil	GBE	1956	Politics/government	President of Brazil
John Kufuor	Ghana	GCB	2007	Politics/government	President of Ghana
Husein Kuli Khan	tbd	KCIE	1902	Politics/government	
Pier Francesco, Marchese di Lajatico	Italy	KCVO	1903	Politics/government	Crown Equerry to the King of Italy
Pierre-Olivier Lapie	France	KBE	tbd	Politics/government	
Alfred, Marquis de Lau d'Allemand	tbd	KCVO	1904	Politics/government	
Dom José d'Almeida Corrêa de Sá, 6th Marquis of Lavradio	Portugal	GCVO	1909	Politics/government	Private Secretary to King Manuel II of Portugal
Lee Kuan Yew	Singapore	CH	1970	Politics/government	Prime minister of Singapore
Lee Kuan Yew	Singapore	GCMG	1972	Politics/government	Prime minister of Singapore
Aleksander Kwaśniewski	Poland	GCB	1996	Politics/government	President of Poland
Aleksander Kwaśniewski	Poland	GCMG	1996	Politics/government	President of Poland
Hans Ritter von Lex	West Germany	KBE	1961	Politics/government	Former state secretary in the west German Interior Ministry, for services to Anglo-German relations.
Wenceslau de Lima	Portugal	GCVO	1903	Politics/government	Minister of Foreign Affairs
Francisco Craveiro Lopes	Portugal	GCB	1955	Politics/government	President of Portugal
Richard Lugar	United States	KBE	2013	Politics/government	Former U.S. Senator from Indiana
Luiz Inácio Lula da Silva	Brazil	GCB	2006	Politics/government	President of Brazil
Joseph Luns	Netherlands	GCMG		Politics/government	
Joseph Luns	Netherlands	CH	1971	Politics/government	
Heinrich Graf Lützow zu Drey Lützow	Austria	KCVO	1903	Politics/government	First Under Secretary of State for Foreign Affairs, Vienna.
Ferenc Mádl	Hungary	GCMG	2002	Politics/government	
Sayyed Abdelrahman el-Mahdi	tbd	KBE	1926	Politics/government	
Mohammed Pasha Mahmud	tbd	GCMG	1929	Politics/government	
Nelson Mandela	South Africa	OM	1995	Politics/government	
Claudia Ruiz Massieu	Mexico	DBE	2015	Politics/government	
Matsukata Masayoshi	Japan	GCMG	1902	Politics/government	Prime Minister of Japan
Thabo Mbeki	South Africa	GCMG	2000	Politics/government	President of South Africa
Thabo Mbeki	South Africa	GCB	2007	Politics/government	President of South Africa
José Antonio Meade Kuribreña	Mexico	KCMG	2015	Politics/government	
Ferdinand Meldahl	Denmark	GCVO	1904	Politics/government	
Carlos Menem	Argentina	GCMG	1998	Politics/government	President of Argentina
Stjepan Mesić	Croatia	GCMG	2001	Politics/government	President of Croatia
Paul Metternich	German Empire	GCVO	1901	Politics/government	
Andreas Michalakopoulos	Greece	KBE	tbd	Politics/government	
Mirza Hussein Khan	Iran	GCSI	1873	Politics/government	
George J. Mitchell	United States	GBE	1999	Politics/government	Former U.S. Senator from Maine, Majority Leader, Deputy President pro tempore
François Mitterrand	France	GCB	1984	Politics/government	
François Mitterrand	France	RVC	1992	Politics/government	
Mobutu Sese Seko	Zaire	GCB	1973	Politics/government	President of Zaire
Alfred Moisiu	Albania	GCMG	2003	Politics/government	President of Albania
Joachim Moltke	Denmark	GCVO	1896	Politics/government	
Felipe, Duke of Montellano	Spain	GCVO	1905	Politics/government	
Alfred, 2nd Prince of Montenuovo	Austria-Hungary	GCVO	1903	Politics/government	Second Lord Steward to the Emperor of Austria, King of Hungary.
Kengo Mori	Japan	KBE	1927	Politics/government	Financial Commissioner to the Imperial Japanese Government in London, Paris and New York.
Robert Mugabe	Zimbabwe	GCB	1994	Politics/government	Annulled 2008
Joseph Muscat	Malta	KCMG	2015	Politics/government	
Benito Mussolini	Italy	GCB	1923	Politics/government	Annulled 1940
Muhammad Tawfiq Nasim Pasha	Egypt	GCMG	1920	Politics/government	
Ibrahim Nasir	Maldives	KBE	1972	Politics/government	President of the Republic of Maldives
Nawaz Sharif	Pakistan	GCMG	1997	Politics/government	Prime Minister of Pakistan
Nursultan Nazarbayev	Kazakhstan	GCMG	2000	Politics/government	President of Kazakhstan
Constantin Freiherr von Neurath	Germany	GCVO	1904	Politics/government	Lord Chamberlain to His Majesty The King of Württemberg
Aurelio Nuño Mayer	Mexico	KBE	2015	Politics/government	
Olusegun Obasanjo	Nigeria	GCB	2003	Politics/government	President of Nigeria
Sadako Ogata	Japan	DCMG	2011	Politics/government	Served as the United Nations High Commissioner for Refugees, as the Chairman of the UNICEF Executive Board and as the President of the Japan International Cooperation Agency.
Waldemar Oldenburg	Denmark	KCVO	1904	Politics/government	
Hussein Fakhry Pasha	Egypt	KCMG	1902	Politics/government	Minister of Public Works for service in connection with the building of the Aswan Dam
Nubar Pasha	Egypt	GCSI	1896	Politics/government	
Saba Pasha	Egypt	KCMG	1907	Politics/government	Upon his retirement from the post of Postmaster-General in Egypt
Safvet Pasha	tbd	GCSI	1878	Politics/government	
Park Geun-hye	South Korea	GCB	2013	Politics/government	President of South Korea
Enrique Peña Nieto	Mexico	GCB	2015	Politics/government	President of Mexico
Manuel Augusto Pereira da Cunha	Portugal	KCVO	1903	Politics/government	Civil Governor of Lisbon
Shimon Peres	Israel	GCMG	2008	Politics/government	9th President of Israel
Hassan Pirnia	Iran	GCMG	1907	Politics/government	
Georges Pompidou	France	GCB	1972	Politics/government	President of France
Byron Price	United States	KBE	1948	Politics/government	Director of the Office of Censorship
Husain Khan Qazvini	tbd	GCSI	1873	Politics/government	
Mahdi Quli Khan-e Qajar Quyunlu	tbd	KCMG	1889	Politics/government	
Sarvepalli Radhakrishnan	India	OM	1963	Politics/government	
Tunku Abdul Rahman	Malaysia	CH	1961	Politics/government	1st Prime Minister of Malaysia
Cyril Ramaphosa	South Africa	GCB	2022	Politics/government	5th President of South Africa. Awarded on occasion of 2022 state visit.
Fidel V. Ramos	Philippines	GCMG	1995	Politics/government	
Anders Fogh Rasmussen	Denmark	KCMG	2015	Politics/government	Secretary-General of NATO
Tun Abdul Razak	Malaysia	GCMG	1972	Politics/government	
Ronald Reagan	United States	GCB	1989	Politics/government	President of the United States
Carl Baron von der Recke	tbd	KCVO	1905	Politics/government	
Eck Baron von Reischach	Württemberg	GCVO	1904	Politics/government	Lord Chamberlain to the Queen of Wurtemberg On the occasion of royal wedding of Prince Alexander of Teck and Princess Alice of Albany
Hugo Freiherr von Reischach	tbd	KCVO	1897	Politics/government	
Oswald Baron von Richthofen	German Empire	GCVO	1904	Politics/government	Minister of Foreign Affairs
Riyad Pasha	Egypt	GCMG	1889	Politics/government	Prime Minister of Egypt
Charles de Rocca-Serra	tbd	KCMG	1917	Politics/government	
Ernst von Röder	tbd	KCVO	1902	Politics/government	
Roh Moo-hyun	South Korea	GCB	2004	Politics/government	
Carlos Roma du Bocage	Portugal	GCVO	1909	Politics/government	Minister for Foreign Affairs
F. W. F. Rosenstand	Denmark	KCVO	1901	Politics/government	Chamberlain and Secretary to the King of Denmark
Hussein Roshdy Pasha	Egypt	GCMG	1914	Politics/government	Prime Minister of Egypt
Friedrich von Ruexleben	tbd	KCVO	1905	Politics/government	
Dean Rusk	United States	KBE	1976	Politics/government	Former Secretary of State for contribution to Anglo-American friendship
Mohamed Said Pasha	Egypt	GCMG	1912	Politics/government	Prime Minister of Egypt
Saionji Kinmochi	Japan	GCMG	1906	Politics/government	Prime Minister of Japan
Juan Manuel Santos	Colombia	GCB	2016	Politics/government	President of Colombia
Antonio Vasco de Mello Silva Cezar e Menezes, Count of Sabugosa	Portugal	GCVO	1909	Politics/government	Lord Steward
Abd al-Muhsin as-Sa'dun	Iraq	KCMG	1926	Politics/government	
Mohammed Said Pasha	tbd	GCMG	1912	Politics/government	
Saito Momotaro	tbd	GCVO	1905	Politics/government	
Mariano, Duke of Santo Mauro	Spain	GCVO	1905	Politics/government	Lord in Waiting to the King of Spain
Giuseppe Saragat	Italy	GCB	1969	Politics/government	President of Italy
Nicolas Sarkozy	France	GCB	2008	Politics/government	President of France
Walter Scheel	West Germany	GCB	1978	Politics/government	President of West Germany
Maurice Schumann	France	GCMG	1972	Politics/government	Minister of Foreign Affairs
Justin de Selves	France	GCVO	1903	Politics/government	Prefect of Seine
Fernando Eduardo de Serpa Pimentel	Portugal	KCVO	1903	Politics/government	(Captain) Aide-de-Camp
Eduard Shevardnadze	Georgia	GCMG	2000	Politics/government	
Said Shoucair Pasha	tbd	KBE	1924	Politics/government	
Ismail Sirry Pasha	tbd	KCMG	1913	Politics/government	
Duke of Sotomayor	Spain	GCVO	1902	Politics/government	Great Chamberlain to the King of Spain
Georges de Staal	tbd	GCVO	1902	Politics/government	
Frank-Walter Steinmeier	Germany	GCB	2023	Politics/government	President of Germany
Dirk Stikker	Netherlands	GBE	1951	Politics/government	
Dirk Stikker	Netherlands	GCVO	1958	Politics/government	
Karl Friedrich von Strenge	tbd	KCVO	1899	Politics/government	
Suharto	Indonesia	GCB	1974	Politics/government	
Cevdet Sunay	Turkey	KCB	1967	Politics/government	
Tony Tan	Singapore	GCB	2014	Politics/government	President of Singapore
Count Tarouca	Portugal	GCVO	1903	Politics/government	Chamberlain to the King of Portugal. Attached to King Edward VII.
Clément Thomas	France	GCIE	1893	Politics/government	Governor of French India
Nicholas Thon	tbd	KCVO	tbd	Politics/government	Subsequently, promoted GCVO in 1905.
Nicholas Thon	tbd	GCVO	1905	Politics/government	
Gaston Thorn	Luxembourg	GCVO		Politics/government	
Gaston Thorn	Luxembourg	GCMG		Politics/government	
Josip Broz Tito	Yugoslavia	GCB	1972	Politics/government	
Tommaso Tittoni	Italy	GCVO	1903	Politics/government	
Ali El Tom	tbd	KBE	1926	Politics/government	
Essad Pasha Toptani	Albania	KCMG	1916	Politics/government	
Karl Prince Trauttmansdorff-Weinsberg	tbd	GCVO	1904	Politics/government	
Alexander Trepoff	Russian Empire	KCMG	1916	Politics/government	Minister of Transport later Prime Minister of Russian Empire awarded in recognition of the construction of the Murman Coast Railway.
Danilo Türk	Slovenia	GCB	2008	Politics/government	
Manuel Valls	France	GCMG	2014	Politics/government	Prime Minister of France
Umberto Vattani	Italy	GCMG	2000	Politics/government	
Simone Veil	France	DBE	1998	Politics/government	Holocaust survivor; lawyer and politician who served as France's Minister of Health between 1993 and 1995.
Luis Videgaray Caso	Mexico	KBE	2015	Politics/government	
Vigdís Finnbogadóttir	Iceland	GCMG	1982	Politics/government	President of Iceland
Vigdís Finnbogadóttir	Iceland	GCB	1990	Politics/government	President of Iceland
Vaira Vīķe-Freiberga	Latvia	GCB	2006	Politics/government	President of Latvia
Antonio Villaça	Portugal	GCVO	1904	Politics/government	Minister of Foreign Affairs
Wenceslau Ramirez de Villa-Urrutia	Spain	GCVO	1905	Politics/government	Minister of Foreign Affairs
Richard von Weizsäcker	Germany	GCB	1992	Politics/government	President of Germany
Youssef Wahba	Egypt	GCMG	1919	Politics/government	Prime Minister of Egypt
Count Carl Wachtmeister	Sweden	KCVO	1908	Politics/government	Minister of Foreign Affairs
Kurt Waldheim	Austria	GCMG	1969	Politics/government	Austrian Foreign Minister
Lech Wałęsa	Poland	GCB	1991	Politics/government	President of Poland
John Warner	United States	KBE	2009	Politics/government	U.S. Senator from Virginia
Rudolf de Weede	Netherlands	KCVO	1904	Politics/government	Lord Chamberlain to Her Majesty the Queen Mother of the Netherlands, on the occasion of the royal wedding of Prince Alexander of Teck and Princess Alice of Albany
Caspar Weinberger	United States	GBE	1988	Politics/government	U.S. Secretary of Defense
Richard von Weizsäcker	Germany	RVC	1992	Politics/government	
John Gilbert Winant	United States	OM	1947	Politics/government	U.S. Ambassador to the United Kingdom
August von Wöllwarth-Lauterburg	Württemberg	GCVO	1900	Politics/government	
Robert Worcester	United States	KBE	2004	Politics/government	Became a British national in 2005 and his knighthood became substantive.
Ketema Yifru	Ethiopia	KCMG	1965	Politics/government	
Giuseppe Zanardelli	Italy	GCVO	1903	Politics/government	President of the Council
Jose Zarco de Camara, Count of Ribeira Grande	Portugal	GCVO	1904	Politics/government	
Ernesto Zedillo	Mexico	GCMG	1998	Politics/government	President of Mexico
Zulfikar Pasha	Egypt	KBE	1920	Politics/government	
Mallam Yahaya	Nigeria	KBE	1953	Politics/government	Emir of Gwandu
Susilo Bambang Yudhoyono	Indonesia	GCB	2012	Politics/government	President of Indonesia
Raja Uda Raja Muhammad	Malaya	KBE	1953	Politics/government	Menteri Besar of the State of Selangor
Jacob Zuma	South Africa	GCB	2010	Politics/government	President of South Africa

== Diplomatic ==
List of honorary British Knights and Dames
Name	Nationality	Honour	Year	Category	Notes
Abderrahman bin Abdelsadok	Morocco	KCVO	1903	Diplomatic	Governor of Fez, Special Envoy from the Sultan of Morocco.
Henry Angst	Switzerland	KCMG	1906	Diplomatic	British Consul-General in Zurich.
Walter Annenberg	United States	KBE	1976	Diplomatic	United States Ambassador to the United Kingdom, 1969–1974, for contribution to Anglo-American friendship.
Jacques Arnavon	France	KBE	1938	Diplomatic	
Frants Ernst Bille	Denmark	GCVO	1904	Diplomatic	Danish Minister in London
Antonio Chiaramonte Bordonaro	Italy	GBE	1930	Diplomatic	
Hugh Bullock	United States	KBE	1957	Diplomatic	President, Pilgrims of the United States, 1955–1996; previously appointed Honorary OBE in 1946
Hugh Bullock	United States	GBE	1976	Diplomatic	
Paul Cambon	France	GCVO	1903	Diplomatic	French Ambassador in London.
André Clasen	Luxembourg	GCVO	1968	Diplomatic	Luxembourg Ambassador
Timoor al-Daghistani	tbd	GCVO	2001	Diplomatic	
John W. Davis	United States	GBE	1953	Diplomatic	Former Ambassador to the Court of Saint James and President of the Pilgrims of the United States.
Lewis Williams Douglas	United States	GBE	1957	Diplomatic	United States Ambassador to the United Kingdom, 1947–1950
Hermann von Eckhardtstein	German Empire	KCVO	1902	Diplomatic	First Secretary German Embassy in London
Aimé-Joseph de Fleuriau	France	GCVO	1921	Diplomatic	French Ambassador to the Court of Saint James.
Léon Geoffray	France	GCVO	1908	Diplomatic	
Diego Gómez Pickering	Mexico	KCVO	2015	Diplomatic	
Lloyd Carpenter Griscom	United States	KCMG	1919	Diplomatic	
Slavko Grouitch	Serbia	KBE	tbd	Diplomatic	
Gunnar Hägglöf	Sweden	GCVO	tbd	Diplomatic	
Hayashi Tadasu	Japan	GCVO	1905	Diplomatic	
Pedro Felipe Iñiguez	Chile	KCVO	1919	Diplomatic	Chilean Special Mission
Louis Joxe	France	KBE	1952	Diplomatic	Head of the cultural relations department of the Foreign Ministry for services to British cultural issues.
Count de Lalaing	Belgium	GCVO	1915	Diplomatic	Belgium Minister in London.
Ferdinand de Lesseps	France	GCSI	1870	Diplomatic	
Li Ching Fong	China	KCVO	1896	Diplomatic	Subsequently, promoted GCVO in 1909.
Li Ching Fong	China	GCVO	1909	Diplomatic	Chinese Minister in London
Li Hung Chang	China	GCVO	1896	Diplomatic	
Dimitry Metaxas	tbd	GCVO	1905	Diplomatic	Envoy Extraordinary and Minister Plenipotentiary of His Majesty The King of the Hellenes at the Court of St. James's.
Armand Mollard	France	KCVO	1903	Diplomatic	Director of Protocole
Nazir ul Mulk	Persia	GCMG	1897	Diplomatic	
Willem J. Oudendyk	Netherlands	KCMG	tbd	Diplomatic	Netherlands Minister in Russia and China
Alberto Pansa	Italy	GCVO	1903	Diplomatic	Italian Ambassador to London
Javier Pérez de Cuéllar	Peru	GCMG	1991	Diplomatic	5th Secretary-General of the United Nations
Wilfried Platzer	Austria	GCVO	tbd	Diplomatic	
Luis Polo de Bernabé	Spain	GCVO	1905	Diplomatic	Spanish Ambassador to the Court of Saint James.
Muhsin Rais	Iran	GCVO	1948	Diplomatic	Iranian Ambassador
Rodrigo Saavedra y Vinent, 2nd Marques de Villalobar	Spain	KCVO	tbd	Diplomatic	Spanish minister in Brussels 1913-1921
Sergey Sazonov	Russia	GCB	1916	Diplomatic	
Comte de Serionne	tbd	KCMG	1917	Diplomatic	Agent Superieur of the Suez Canal Company
Kamalesh Sharma	India	GCVO	2016	Diplomatic	Commonwealth Secretary-General
Marquis de Soveral	Portugal	GCMG	1897	Diplomatic	
Marquis de Soveral	Portugal	GCVO	1902	Diplomatic	
Ismael Tocornal	Chile	GCVO	1919	Diplomatic	Head of the Chilean Special Mission
Dimitri Tzokoff	Bulgaria	KCVO	1905	Diplomatic	

== Military ==
List of honorary British Knights and Dames
Name	Nationality	Honour	Year	Category	Notes
Jean-Marie Charles Abrial	France	KCB	1940	Military	(Admiral) Commandant-en-Chef des Forces Maritimes du Nord, for his services in connection with the withdrawal of the Allied forces from Dunkirk
Alfredo Acton	Italy	KCB	tbd	Military	(Admiral)
Christian Henrik Arendrup	Denmark	GCVO	1904	Military	(Major General)
Gustav Carl Heinrich Ferdinand Emil von Arnim	German Empire	GCVO	1900	Military	(General)
Henry H. Arnold	United States	GCB	1945	Military	(General of the Army) Chief of Staff, United States Army Air Force
Felice Avogadro dei Conti di Quinto	Italy	GCVO	1904	Military	(Lieutenant-General) Inspector of Cavalry, Italian Army
Viktor Balck	Sweden	KCMG	tbd	Military	
Edouard Barrera	France	KCVO	1897	Military	(Vice-Admiral) Commander-in-Chief and Maritime Prefect of Brest
José Bascarán y Federic	Spain	GCVO	1905	Military	(General) Chief of the Military Household
Friedrich Count von Baudissin	German Empire	KCVO	1904	Military	(Rear-Admiral, Imperial German Navy) Aide-de-Camp to the German Emperor, attached to King Edward VII
Anton Baron von Bechtolsheim	Austria-Hungary	GCVO	1903	Military	(General of Cavalry) Captain of the Tranbenten and Infantry Companies of the Life Guards, attached to King Edward VII
Prince Konstantin Belosselsky-Belozersky	Russia	GCVO	1909	Military	(Lieutenant General) Adjutant General to the Czar of Russia
John Biddle	United States	KCB	1918	Military	(Major-General) Commanding United States troops in the United Kingdom
Georges Blanchard	France	KCB	1940	Military	(General) in recognition of distinguished service in operations in Belgium and Northern France
Tasker H. Bliss	United States	GCMG	1918	Military	(General) Chief of Staff of the United States Army and United States representative at Versailles
Leopoldo Boado y Montes	Italy	KCVO	1905	Military	(Rear Admiral)
Friedrich von Bock und Polack	German Empire	GCVO	1904	Military	(Lieutenant-General) Commander 9th Army Corps
Petar Bojović	Serbia	GCMG	1918	Military	(Field Marshal) Chief of the General Staff of the Serbian Army
Augustin Boué de Lapeyrère	France	KCB	1915	Military	(Admiral) Commander of French naval forces in the Mediterranean
Omar Bradley	United States	KCB	tbd	Military	(General of the Army) Commander of the 12th Army Group, Chief of Staff of the United States Army and Chairman of the Joint Chiefs of Staff
Guilherme Augusto de Brito Capello	Portugal	KCVO	1902	Military	
Hermenegildo de Brito Capello	Portugal	KCVO	1903	Military	(Rear-Admiral) Aide-de-Camp to His Majesty the King of Portugal. Attached to His Majesty King Edward VII. Subsequently, promoted GCVO in 1904.
Hermenegildo de Brito Capello	Portugal	GCVO	1904	Military	(Rear-Admiral) Aide-de-Camp to His Majesty the King of Portugal.
Herrmann von Broizem	German Empire	GCVO	1904	Military	(General) Commander of XIIth Army Corps, German Army
Karl Baron von Bronn	Austria-Hungary	KCVO	1909	Military	(Colonel) Aide-de-Camp to the Emperor of Austria, King of Hungary
Charles George, Baron von Bronn	Austria-Hungary	KCVO	1909	Military	(Lieutenant-Colonel) Equerry to the Emperor of Austria, King of Hungary
Ugo Brusati	Italy	GCVO	1903	Military	(General) First Aide-de-Camp to the King of Italy
Wilhelm Büchsel	German Empire	GCVO	1904	Military	(Vice-Admiral) Chief of Staff Imperial German Navy
Karl von Bülow	German Empire	GCVO	1909	Military	(General) Commander 3rd Army Corps
Luigi Cadorna	Italy	GCB	1915	Military	(Marshal of Italy) Chief of Staff of the Italian Army
François Certain Canrobert	France	GCB	tbd	Military	(Marshal of France) Commander of French forces in the Crimean War
Luis Gomez Carreño	Chile	KCVO	1919	Military	(Admiral) Chilean Special Mission
Ivan Chaghin	Russia	KCVO	1909	Military	(Rear Admiral) Commander of the Imperial yacht Standart
Chiang Kai-shek	China	GCB	1942	Military	(Generalissimo) Leader of Nationalist China
Mark W. Clark	United States	KBE	1944	Military	(General) Commander 5th Army and 15th Army Group
Wesley Clark	United States	KBE	2000	Military	(General) NATO Supreme Allied Commander
Henri de la Croix	France	GCVO	1903	Military	(General) Attached to King Edward VII
Martin Dempsey	United States	KBE	2016	Military	(General) Chairman of the Joint Chiefs of Staff
Alphons, Count zu Dohna	German Empire	KCVO	1909	Military	(Major-General) Commander of the Cavalry Division of the Guards.
William Joseph Donovan	United States	KBE	tbd	Military	(Major General) Head of the OSS, precursor to the CIA
James Doolittle	United States	KCB	1944	Military	(Lieutenant-General) Commander 8th US Army Air Force
A. M. J. Dor de Lastours	France	KCMG	1915	Military	
Antonio Duartt e Silva	Portugal	KCVO	1903	Military	(Colonel) Commanding Portuguese Cavalry Regiment No. 3
Émile Dubois	France	GCVO	1903	Military	Chief of the Military Household of the President of France
Joseph Dunford	United States	KBE	2020	Military	(General) Chairman of the Joint Chiefs of Staff.
Charles John George von Eisendecher	German Empire	GCVO	1904	Military	(Vice-Admiral)
Dwight D. Eisenhower	United States	GCB	1945	Military	(General of the Army) Supreme Commander, Allied Expeditionary Force and President of the United States
Dwight D. Eisenhower	United States	OM	1945	Military	(General of the Army) Supreme Commander, Allied Expeditionary Force.
Maximilian von Engelbrechten	German Empire	KCVO	1904	Military	(Colonel) Commander 36th Infantry Brigade
François Ernest Fournier	France	GCVO	1903	Military	(Admiral) Attached to King Edward VII
Prince Louis Esterházy	Spain	GCVO	1902	Military	Lieutenant-General
Marie-Pierre de Fauque de Jonquières	France	KCMG	1915	Military	
Francisco Joaquim Ferreira do Amaral	Portugal	KCVO	1903	Military	(Rear-Admiral) President of the Royal Geographical Society, Lisbon
Max Fischel	German Empire	KCVO	1904	Military	(Rear-Admiral, Imperial German Navy) Admiral Superintendent of the Dockyard, Kiel
Ferdinand Foch	France	GCB	1914	Military	(Marshal of France) Commander-in-Chief of Allied Forces
Ferdinand Foch	France	OM	1918	Military	(Marshal of France) Commander-in-Chief of Allied Forces
Benoit de Formel de la Laurencie	France	KBE	1940	Military	(General) in recognition of distinguished service in operations in Belgium and Northern France.
Tommy Franks	United States	KBE	2004	Military	(General) Commander of United States Central Command
Giovanni Frigerio	Italy	GCVO	1903	Military	(Vice-Admiral) Commander-in-Chief of the Italian Mediterranean Squadron, Naples
Fukushima Yasumasa	Japan	KCB	tbd	Military	(General)
Jean-Louis Georgelin	France	KBE	2014	Military	(General) Great Chancellor of the Legion of Honour
William C. Gorgas	United States	KCMG	1920	Military	(Major General) Surgeon General of the United States Army
Emile Guépratte	France	KCB	1916	Military	
Albert Guérisse	Belgium	KBE	tbd	Military	(Major General) Leader of the Belgian Resistance
Alexis Hagron	tbd	KCVO	1898	Military	
Henry Kent Hewitt	United States	KCB	1945	Military	(Admiral) Commander of Allied Amphibious Forces at the Normandy Invasion
William F. Halsey Jr.	United States	KBE	tbd	Military	(Fleet Admiral) Commander of the 3rd Fleet
Olaf M. Hustvedt	United States	KBE	tbd	Military	(Vice Admiral) Commander of US Navy forces in Operation Leander
Leopold Ritter von Jedina	tbd	KCVO	1903	Military	(Rear-Admiral) attached to King Edward VII.
Joseph Joffre	France	GCB	tbd	Military	(Marshal of France) Chief of the French General Staff
Joseph Joffre	France	GCVO	1914	Military	(Marshal of France) Chief of the French General Staff
Joseph Joffre	France	OM	1919	Military	(Marshal of France) Chief of the French General Staff
Kamio Mitsuomi	Japan	GCMG	1915	Military	(General) Commander of allied land forces at the Siege of Tsingtao
Kato Sadakichi	Japan	GCMG	1915	Military	(Admiral) Commander of Japanese naval forces at the Siege of Tsingtao
Gustav von Kessel	German Empire	GCVO	1901	Military	
Alan Goodrich Kirk	United States	KCB	1943	Military	(Admiral) Commander of US Naval Amphibious Forces in the Mediterranean and at the Normandy Invasion
Hans von Koester	German Empire	GCVO	1904	Military	(Admiral) Commander-in-Chief and Inspector General of the Imperial German Navy
Wenzel Freiherr Kotz von Dobrz	Austria-Hungary	GCVO	1904	Military	Privy Councillor and Chamberlain to His Imperial Majesty The Emperor of Austria and King of Hungary
Marian Kukiel	Poland	KCB	tbd	Military	(Major General) Commander of the 1st Polish Corps
Johan Laidoner	Estonia	KCMG	tbd	Military	(General) Commander-in-Chief of the Estonian Army
Jean de Lattre de Tassigny	France	GCB	1952	Military	(Général d'Armée) Commander of the First French Army and the French Far East Expeditionary Corps
John C. H. Lee	United States	KCB	1945	Military	(Lt. General), Commanding General, United States Army Services of Supply, European Theater of Operations, United States Army
J. M. E. G. Lefevre	France	KCMG	1915	Military	
André Lemonnier	France	KCB	tbd	Military	
Waldemar Edward Lemvigh	Denmark	KCVO	1904	Military	Colonel
Milans del Bosch y Carrio Joaquin Mario Leon	Spain	KCVO	1905	Military	(Colonel) Aide-de-Camp to the King of Spain
Edward Mann Lewis	United States	KCMG	1919	Military	(Major General) Commanded 30th Infantry Division in WWI
Edward Mann Lewis	United States	KCB	1919	Military	(Major General) Commanded 30th Infantry Division in WWI
Rudolf Prince von und zu Liechtenstein	Austria-Hungary	GCVO	1903	Military	First Lord Steward and Acting Master of the Horse to the Emperor of Austria, King of Hungary.
Alfred von Loewenfeld	German Empire	KCVO	1902	Military	Subsequently, promoted GCVO in 1905.
Alfred von Loewenfeld	German Empire	GCVO	1905	Military	
Douglas MacArthur	United States	GCB	1943	Military	(General of the Army)
Comte de Maigret	France	KCVO	1899	Military	
Pio Carlo di Majo	Italy	KCVO	1903	Military	(Major-General) Aide-de-Camp to King of Italy, attached to King Edward VII.
Mikhail Malinin	Soviet Union	KBE	1945	Military	(Colonel-General)
Carl Gustaf Emil Mannerheim	Finland	GBE	1938	Military	(Marshal of Finland)
Peyton March	United States	GCMG	1918	Military	(General) Chief of the General Staff, United States Army
Nogi Maresuke	Japan	GCB	1911	Military	
Peter Markoff	tbd	GCVO	1905	Military	
Wolf, Baron Marschall	German Empire	KCVO	1909	Military	(Major-General) Attached to King George VII
George Marshall	United States	GCB	1945	Military	(General of the Army) Chief of Staff, United States Army
Rodolphe Maton	Belgium	KBE	1955	Military	
Hugo Graf Mensdorff-Pouilly	German Empire	KCVO	1904	Military	
Roberto Miranda Moreno	Mexico	KBE	2015	Military	
Živojin Mišić	Serbia	KCB	1915	Military	(Field Marshal) Chief of the Supreme Command of the Serbian Army
Živojin Mišić	Serbia	GCMG	1916	Military	(Field Marshal) Chief of the Supreme Command of the Serbian Army
Helmuth von Moltke the Younger	German Empire	KCVO	1901	Military	(Colonel General) Chief of the German General Staff
Anne de Montmorency	France	KG	1532	Military	(Marshal of France)
François, Duke of Montmorency	France	KG	1572	Military	(Marshal of France)
Enrico Morin	Italy	GCVO	1903	Military	(Vice-Admiral) Minister for Foreign Affairs
Edward von Müller	German Empire	GCVO	1897	Military	
François de Négrier	France	GCVO	1898	Military	
Chester W. Nimitz	United States	GCB	1945	Military	(Fleet Admiral) Commander of the Pacific Fleet and Pacific Ocean Area
Hély d'Oissel	France	KCB	1915	Military	
Kuwashi Okazawa	Japan	GCVO	tbd	Military	
Oyama Iwao	Japan	OM	1906	Military	
Eduard Graf Paar	Austria-Hungary	GCVO	1903	Military	(General of Cavalry) Senior Aide-de-Camp to the Emperor of Austria, King of Hungary
Adolf Palander	German Empire	GCVO	1908	Military	
Alexander Papagos	Greece	GBE	1941	Military	(General) Commander-in-chief allied forces in Greece during the Albanian campaign
Mason Patrick	United States	KBE	1918	Military	(Major General) Chief of US Army Air Service
George S. Patton	United States	KBE	tbd	Military	(General) Commander of the United States 3rd Army
Ettore Pedotti	Italy	GCVO	1903	Military	(General) Commander Xth Army Corps, attached to King Edward VII
John J. Pershing	United States	GCB	1918	Military	(General of the Armies of the United States) Commander-in-Chief United States Expeditionary Force in France
Philippe Pétain	France	GCMG	tbd	Military	(Marshal of France)
Johan Pitka	Estonia	KCMG	1920	Military	(Rear Admiral) Commander-in-Chief of the Estonian Navy
Nobile Porro	Italy	GCMG	1915	Military	
Colin Powell	United States	KCB	1993	Military	(General) Chairman of the Joint Chiefs of Staff, National Security Advisor and Secretary of State
Karl Freiherr von Röder	German Empire	KCVO	1904	Military	
Hugh Rodman	United States	KCB	1918	Military	(Admiral) Commander of Battleship Division Nine and the United States Pacific Fleet
Konstantin Rokossovsky	Soviet Union	KCB	1945	Military	(Marshal of the Soviet Union)
Tomás António Garcia Rosado	Portugal	KCMG	tbd	Military	
Sa Zhenbing	Qing Dynasty	KCMG	1909	Military	
Dedo Charles Henry von Schenck	German Empire	GCVO	1909	Military	(Lieutenant-General) Commander 2nd Division of the Guards
Norman Schwarzkopf Jr.	United States	KCB	1991	Military	(General) Commander of United States Central Command and coalition forces during Operation Desert Storm
Brent Scowcroft	United States	KBE	1993	Military	(Lieutenant General) National Security Advisor
Baron von Seckendorff	German Empire	GCVO	1904	Military	(Vice-Admiral) Master of the Household to Prince Henry of Prussia
Antonin de Selliers de Moranville	Belgium	KCB	tbd	Military	Commander-in-Chief
Fernando de Serpa Pimentel	Portugal	KCVO	1909	Military	(Captain)
William Hood Simpson	United States	KBE	1945	Military	(Lieutenant General) Commanding General, 9th United States Army
William S. Sims	United States	GCMG	1918	Military	(Admiral) Commander of United States Naval Forces in Europe
Rudolf Carl von Slatin	Austria-Hungary	KCMG	1900	Military	Lieutenant-General (Egyptian Army)
Rudolf Carl von Slatin	Austria-Hungary	KCVO	1909	Military	Inspector-General of Anglo-Egyptian Sudan
Leighton W. Smith Jr.	United States	KBE	1997	Military	(Admiral) Commander of NATO Forces in Southern Europe
Levering Smith	United States	KBE	1962	Military	(Vice Admiral) Led the Polaris Missile effort to win the Cold War
Walter Bedell Smith	United States	KCB	1944	Military	(General) Chief of Staff of Supreme Headquarters, Allied Expeditionary Force
Walter Bedell Smith	United States	GBE	1945	Military	(General) Chief of Staff of Supreme Headquarters, Allied Expeditionary Force and Director of the CIA
Carl Spaatz	United States	KBE	1944	Military	(General) Commander of United States Strategic Air Forces in Europe, Strategic Air Command and Chief of Staff of the United States Air Force
Carl Spaatz	United States	GBE	1945	Military	(General) Commander of the 8th Air Force, Strategic Air Command and Chief of Staff of the United States Air Force
George Owen Squier	United States	KCMG	1919	Military	(Major General) Chief of the Signal Corps
Stepa Stepanović	Serbia	GCMG	1918	Military	
Joseph Strauss	United States	KCMG	1918	Military	
Tamemoto Kuroki	Japan	GCMG	tbd	Military	
Tanaka Giichi	Japan	KCMG	tbd	Military	
Tanaka Giichi	Japan	GBE	tbd	Military	
William L. Timlin	tbd	KBE	1990	Military	
Alfred von Tirpitz	German Empire	GCVO	1904	Military	(Admiral) Minister of Marine
Togo Heihachiro	Japan	GCVO	tbd	Military	Admiral
Togo Heihachiro	Japan	OM	1906	Military	Admiral
Guido von Usedom	German Empire	KCMG	1906	Military	Imperial German Navy
Guido von Usedom	German Empire	GCVO	1909	Military	Vice-Admiral, Imperial German Navy
Emilio Vaglia	Italy	GCVO	1903	Military	(General) Lord Steward to the King of Italy
Frederick Otto Wahle	Saxony	KCVO	1904	Military	(Major-General) Commanding Royal Saxon Field Engineers
Yamagata Aritomo	Japan	OM	1906	Military	
Nikolai Yermoloff	Russia	KCVO	1905	Military	(Major-General) Military Attache to the Imperial Russian Embassy, London
George Zachariae	Denmark	KCVO	1901	Military	(Rear-Admiral) Royal Danish Navy
Georgy Zhukov	Soviet Union	GCB	1945	Military	(Marshal of the Soviet Union) Commander of the 1st Belorussian Front

== Business ==
List of honorary British Knights and Dames
Name	Nationality	Honour	Year	Category	Notes
Angela Ahrendts	United States	DBE	2013	Business	Chief executive of Burberry plc. Became a British national in 2023 and damehood became substantive.
Auguste-Louis-Albéric, Prince d'Arenberg	France	GCSI	1909	Business	Member of the Institute of France, President of the Suez Canal Company
Ariyoshi Yoshiya	Japan	KBE	tbd	Business	Chairman of the Japanese Shipowners Association
Bernard Arnault	France	KBE	2012	Business	Founder, Chairman and Chief executive of LVMH.
André Bénard	France	KBE	1991	Business	Chairman, Eurotunnel, 1986–1994
Antonin Besse	France	KBE	tbd	Business	
Ana Patricia Botín	Spain	DBE	2015	Business	Chairman of Santander Bank
Henri Deterding	Netherlands	KBE	1920	Business	
Sierd Sint Eriks	Netherlands	KBE	1961	Business	Managing director of Mullard Ltd for valuable services to British official interests.
Niall FitzGerald	Ireland	KBE	2002	Business	
Bill Gates	United States	KBE	2004	Business	Chairman of Microsoft and Corbis and Co-Chair of the Gates Foundation in recognition of his business skills and for his work on poverty reduction.
Lou Gerstner	United States	KBE	tbd	Business	
Paul Getty	United States	KBE	1987	Business	Became a British national in 1997 and knighthood became substantive.
Carlos Ghosn	Brazil-France-Lebanon	KBE	2006	Business	
Cecil H. Green	United States	KBE	1991	Business	He lost British nationality upon becoming a US citizen before 1949.
Hermann Hauser	Austria	KBE	2015	Business	
Yii Ann Hii	Philippines	KBE		Business	Became a British national on 3 July 2012.
Kazuo Inamori	Japan	KBE	2019	Business	
Sam E. Jonah	Ghana	KBE	2003	Business	
Ralph Lauren	United States	KBE	2019	Business	
Kim Sang Man	South Korea	KBE	1981	Business	Publisher
Gerrit Klijnstra	Netherlands	KBE	1973	Business	
Jonkheer Loudon	Netherlands	KBE	1960	Business	President of the Royal Dutch Petroleum Company and senior managing director of the Royal Dutch/Shell group in recognition of his important contributions to the national economy and to British interests abroad.
Akio Morita	Japan	KBE	1993	Business	
Lewis Mumford	United States	KBE	1975	Business	For services to town planning in Great Britain.
Hiroaki Nakanishi	Japan	KBE	2015	Business	Chief executive of Hitachi Corporation
Martin Naughton	Ireland	KBE	2015	Business	
Masaru Shinchi	tbd	KBE	2002	Business	
Paul Rykens	Netherlands	KBE	1959	Business	
Edgar Sengier	Belgium	KBE	1956	Business	President of the permanent committee of the Union Minière du Haut Katanga for valuable services to Britain and to Anglo-Belgian relations.
Antonio Joaquim Simoes de Almeida	Portugal	KCVO	1903	Business	President of the Commercial Association of Lisbon
Ralf Speth	Germany	KBE	2015	Business	Chief executive of Jaguar Land Rover
Chandrika Prasad Srivastava	India	KCMG	1990	Business	
Peter Sutherland	Ireland	KCMG	2004	Business	
Basil Zaharoff	Greece	GBE	1918	Business	
Basil Zaharoff	Greece	GCB	1919	Business	
Jamshed Jiji Irani	India	KBE	2007	Business	Former President of British Steel and Iron Research Association, Tata Steel

== Religion ==
List of honorary British Knights and Dames
Name	Nationality	Honour	Year	Category	Notes
Abd al-Rahman al-Mahdi	Anglo-Egyptian Sudan	KBE	1926	Religion	Imam of the Ansar
Zaki Badawi	Egypt	KBE	2004	Religion	
Billy Graham	United States	KBE	2001	Religion	
Gilbert John Helmer	Bohemia	KCVO	1909	Religion	Abbot of Tepl on occasion of the King's visit to Marienbad, Helmer did not receive the honour of Knighthood.
Sheikh Ali bin Salim	Kenya	KBE	1929	Religion	Leader of the Arab community and member of the legislature
Yeghishe Tourian	Palestine	KBE	1930	Religion	Armenian Patriarch of Jerusalem

== European royalty ==
List of honorary British Knights and Dames
Name	Nationality	Honour	Year	Category	Notes
Prince Wilhelm I	Albania	GCVO	1914	Royalty	
King Alfonso V	Aragon	KG	1450	Royalty	
King Ferdinand II	Aragon	KG	1480	Royalty	
Emperor Francis I	Austria-Hungary	KG	1814	Royalty	
Emperor Franz Joseph I	Austria-Hungary	KG	1867	Royalty	Degraded 1915
Emperor Franz Joseph I	Austria-Hungary	RVC	1904	Royalty	Annulled 1915
Emperor Charles I	Austria-Hungary	GCVO	tbd	Royalty	
Crown Prince Rudolf	Austria-Hungary	KG	1887	Royalty	
Archduke Charles	Austria-Hungary	GCB	1834	Royalty	
Archduke Friedrich	Austria-Hungary	GCB	1842	Royalty	Originally appointed 1841, but only invested as CB at that time
Archduke Franz Ferdinand	Austria-Hungary	GCB	1901	Royalty	
Archduke Franz Ferdinand	Austria-Hungary	KG	1902	Royalty	
Archduke Ludwig Victor	Austria-Hungary	GCVO	1903	Royalty	
Archduke Leopold Salvator	Austria-Hungary	GCVO	1903	Royalty	
Archduke Franz Salvator	Austria-Hungary	GCVO	1903	Royalty	
Archduke Rainer Ferdinand	Austria-Hungary	GCVO	1903	Royalty	
Archduke Friedrich	Austria-Hungary	GCB	1904	Royalty	
Archduke Eugen	Austria-Hungary	GCVO	1908	Royalty	
Archduke Joseph August	Austria-Hungary	GCVO	1908	Royalty	
King Leopold I	Belgium	KG	1816	Royalty	
King Leopold I	Belgium	GCB	1816	Royalty	
King Leopold II	Belgium	KG	1866	Royalty	
King Albert I	Belgium	KG	1914	Royalty	
King Albert I	Belgium	GCB	tbd	Royalty	
King Leopold III	Belgium	KG	1935	Royalty	
King Leopold III	Belgium	RVC	1937	Royalty	
King Leopold III	Belgium	GCVO	tbd	Royalty	
King Baudouin I	Belgium	KG	1963	Royalty	
King Albert II	Belgium	GCVO	1966	Royalty	
Prince Charles	Belgium	GCVO	tbd	Royalty	
Emperor Pedro II	Brazil	KG	1871	Royalty	
Duke John V	Brittany	KG	1375	Royalty	
King Ferdinand I	Bulgaria	GCVO	1904	Royalty	
King Ferdinand I	Bulgaria	GCB	1905	Royalty	
Prince Alexander	Bulgaria	GCB	1879	Royalty	Civil
Prince Alexander	Bulgaria	GCB	1886	Royalty	Military
Duke Charles the Bold	Burgundy	KG	1468	Royalty	
King Philip I	Castile	KG	1503	Royalty	
King Eric VII	Denmark	KG	1404	Royalty	
King John	Denmark	KG	1493	Royalty	
King Frederick II	Denmark	KG	1578	Royalty	
King Christian IV	Denmark	KG	1603	Royalty	
King Christian V	Denmark	KG	1662	Royalty	
King Frederick VI	Denmark	KG	1822	Royalty	
King Christian IX	Denmark	GCB	1863	Royalty	
King Christian IX	Denmark	KG	1865	Royalty	
King Christian IX	Denmark	RVC	1904	Royalty	
King Frederik VIII	Denmark	GCB	1888	Royalty	
King Frederik VIII	Denmark	KG	1896	Royalty	
King Frederik VIII	Denmark	GCVO	1901	Royalty	
King Frederik VIII	Denmark	RVC	1902	Royalty	
King Christian X	Denmark	GCVO	1901	Royalty	
King Christian X	Denmark	GCB	1908	Royalty	
King Christian X	Denmark	KG	1914	Royalty	
King Frederik IX	Denmark	KG	1951	Royalty	
King Frederik IX	Denmark	RVC	1957	Royalty	
King Frederik IX	Denmark	GCVO	tbd	Royalty	
King Frederik IX	Denmark	GCB	tbd	Royalty	
Queen Margrethe II	Denmark	RVC	1974	Royalty	
Queen Margrethe II	Denmark	LG	1979	Royalty	
Prince Valdemar	Denmark	GCB	1901	Royalty	
Prince Harald	Denmark	GCVO	1901	Royalty	
Prince Gustav	Denmark	GCVO	1908	Royalty	
Prince Aage	Denmark	GCVO	tbd	Royalty	
Prince Axel	Denmark	GCVO	1925	Royalty	
Prince Georg	Denmark	KCVO	tbd	Royalty	
Prince consort Henrik	Denmark	GCB	2000	Royalty	
Prince consort Henrik	Denmark	GCMG	1979	Royalty	
Prince consort Henrik	Denmark	GCVO	1974	Royalty	
Giuliano di Lorenzo de' Medici	Florence	KG	1514	Royalty	
King Francis I	France	KG	1527	Royalty	
King Henry II	France	KG	1551	Royalty	
King Charles IX	France	KG	1564	Royalty	
King Henry III	France	KG	1575	Royalty	
King Henry IV	France	KG	1590	Royalty	
King Louis XVIII	France	KG	1814	Royalty	
King Charles X	France	KG	1825	Royalty	
King Louis Philippe I	France	KG	1844	Royalty	
Emperor Napoleon III	France	KG	1855	Royalty	
Empress Eugénie	France	GBE	1919	Royalty	
Prince Napoléon-Jérôme	France	GCB	1855	Royalty	
Prince Aribert	Anhalt (Note: Germany)	GCB	1891	Royalty	
Prince Luitpold	Bavaria	GCB	1901	Royalty	
Prince Luitpold	Bavaria	KG	1911	Royalty	
Crown Prince Rupprecht	Bavaria	GCVO	tbd	Royalty	
Prince Ferdinand	Bavaria	GCVO	1907	Royalty	
Prince Leopold	Bavaria	GCVO	1907	Royalty	
Prince Georg	Bavaria	GCVO	1908	Royalty	
Prince Konrad	Bavaria	GCVO	1908	Royalty	
Grand Duke Friedrich II	Baden	GCVO	1905	Royalty	
Grand Duke Friedrich I	Baden	KG	1906	Royalty	
Prince Francis Joseph	Battenberg	GCVO	1897	Royalty	
Prince Francis Joseph	Battenberg	KCB	1896	Royalty	
Elector Frederick William	Brandenburg	KG	1654	Royalty	
Duke William the Victorious, Duke of Brunswick-Lüneburg	Brunswick or Hanover	KG	1450	Royalty	
Prince Ferdinand of Brunswick-Bevern	Brunswick or Hanover	KG	1759	Royalty	
Duke George William of Brunswick-Lüneburg	Brunswick or Hanover	KG	1690	Royalty	
Elector George Louis	Brunswick or Hanover	KG	1701	Royalty	Later King George I of Great Britain
Prince George Augustus of Brunswick-Lüneburg	Brunswick or Hanover	KG	1706	Royalty	Later King George II of Great Britain
Duke Karl Wilhelm Ferdinand of Brunswick-Lüneburg	Brunswick or Hanover	KG	1765	Royalty	
Duke William of Brunswick-Lüneburg	Brunswick or Hanover	KG	1831	Royalty	
Duke Christian of Brunswick-Wolfenbüttel	Brunswick or Hanover	KG	1624	Royalty	
Emperor Wilhelm I	German Empire (Note: Germany. Before 1850, see Prussia)	GCB	1857	Royalty	
Emperor Wilhelm I	German Empire	KG	1861	Royalty	Upon becoming King of Prussia.
Emperor Frederick III	German Empire	KG	1858	Royalty	Upon becoming a son-in-law of Queen Victoria whilst a Prince of Prussia.
Emperor Frederick III	German Empire	GCB	1883	Royalty	
Emperor Wilhelm II	German Empire	KG	1879	Royalty	Degraded 1915
Emperor Wilhelm II	German Empire	GCVO	1899	Royalty	Annulled 1915
Emperor Wilhelm II	German Empire	RVC	1902	Royalty	Annulled 1915
Crown Prince Wilhelm	German Empire	KG	1901	Royalty	Degraded 1915
Crown Prince Wilhelm	German Empire	RVC	1904	Royalty	
Grand Duke Frederick Augustus II	German Empire	GCVO	1907	Royalty	
Prince Wilhelm	German Empire	GCB	1843	Royalty	
Prince Waldemar	German Empire	GCB	1846	Royalty	
Prince Friedrich Karl	German Empire	GCB	1878	Royalty	
Prince George Victor	German Empire	GCB	1882	Royalty	
Prince Heinrich	German Empire	KG	1889	Royalty	Degraded 1915
Prince Heinrich	German Empire	RVC	1902	Royalty	Annulled 1915
Prince Friedrich Leopold	German Empire	GCVO	1899	Royalty	
Prince Friedrich	German Empire	GCB	1904	Royalty	
Prince Eitel Friederich	German Empire	GCVO	1904	Royalty	
Prince August Wilhelm	German Empire	GCVO	1904	Royalty	
Prince Oskar	German Empire	GCVO	1904	Royalty	
Prince Joachim	German Empire	GCVO	1904	Royalty	
Prince Adalbert	German Empire	GCVO	1909	Royalty	
Prince William	German Empire	GCVO	1904	Royalty	On the occasion of royal wedding of Prince Alexander of Teck and Princess Alice of Albany
Prince Alexis	German Empire	GCVO	1904	Royalty	
Prince Karl Anton	German Empire	GCVO	1907	Royalty	
Prince Albert	German Empire	GCB	tbd	Royalty	
Prince Friedrich	German Empire	GCVO	tbd	Royalty	
Duke Peter Alexandrovich	German Empire	GCVO	1908	Royalty	
Grand Duke Ludwig III of Hesse and by Rhine	Hesse	KG	1865	Royalty	
Grand Duke Ludwig IV of Hesse and by Rhine	Hesse	KG	1862	Royalty	
Grand Duke Ernst Ludwig of Hesse and by Rhine	Hesse	KG	1887	Royalty	Degraded 1915
Grand Duke Ernest Louis of Hesse and by Rhine	Hesse	KG	1892	Royalty	Degraded 1915
Grand Duke Ernest Louis of Hesse and by Rhine	Hesse	RVC	1902	Royalty	Annulled 1915
Landgrave Wilhelm IX of Hesse-Kassel or Hesse-Cassel	Hesse	KG	1786	Royalty	
Landgrave Alexander Frederick	Hesse	GCVO	1907	Royalty	
Prince Ernest Frederick of Hesse-Philippsthal-Barchfeld	Hesse	GCB	1835	Royalty	
Prince Alexander of Hesse and by Rhine	Hesse	GCB	1885	Royalty	
Prince Heinrich of Hesse and by Rhine	Hesse	GCB	1892	Royalty	
Prince Frederick Charles	Hesse	GCB	1897	Royalty	
Landgrave Louis William of Hesse-Homburg	Hesse	GCB	1836	Royalty	
Karl, Prince Kinsky von Wchynitz und Tettau	Kinsky	GCVO	1905	Royalty	
Prince Charles	Leiningen	KG	1837	Royalty	
Elector Frederick V	The Palatinate	KG	1612	Royalty	
Elector Karl II	The Palatinate	KG	1680	Royalty	
King Frederick I	Prussia (Note: Germany. After 1850, see German Empire)	KG	1690	Royalty	
King Frederick William III	Prussia	KG	1814	Royalty	
King Frederick William IV	Prussia	KG	1842	Royalty	
Henry XXX, Prince Reuss	Reuss	GCVO	1900	Royalty	
Duke Ernst I	Saxe-Coburg and Gotha	KG	1838	Royalty	
Duke Ernest II	Saxe-Coburg and Gotha	KG	1844	Royalty	
Duke Carl Eduard	Saxe-Coburg and Gotha	GCVO	1901	Royalty	Annulled 1915
Duke Carl Eduard	Saxe-Coburg and Gotha	KG	1902	Royalty	Degraded 1915
Duke Friderich III	Saxe-Coburg and Gotha	KG	1741	Royalty	
Duke Ernst Ludwig	Saxe-Coburg and Gotha	KG	1790	Royalty	
Prince Ferdinand	Saxe-Coburg and Gotha	GCB	1839	Royalty	
Prince Philipp	Saxe-Coburg and Gotha	GCB	1885	Royalty	
Prince Philipp	Saxe-Coburg and Gotha	GCVO	1906	Royalty	
Duke Bernhard II	Saxe-Meiningen	KG	1830	Royalty	
Duke Bernhard III	Saxe-Meiningen	GCB	1887	Royalty	
Prince Bernhard	Saxe-Weimar-Eisenach	GCB	1830	Royalty	
Duke John Adolphus	Saxe-Weissenfels	KG	1745	Royalty	
Elector John George II	Saxony	KG	1668	Royalty	
Elector John George IV	Saxony	KG	1692	Royalty	
King Frederick Augustus II	Saxony	KG	1842	Royalty	
King Albert	Saxony	KG	1882	Royalty	
Prince Adolphus I	Schaumburg-Lippe	GCB	1882	Royalty	
Prince Adolf	Schaumburg-Lippe	GCB	tbd	Royalty	
Prince Johann	Schleswig-Holstein-Sonderburg-Glücksburg	GCVO	1901	Royalty	
Prince Albert Christian Adolphus Eugene	Schleswig-Holstein-Sonderburg-Glücksburg	GCVO	1904	Royalty	
Duke Friedrich Ferdinand	Schleswig-Holstein-Sonderburg-Glücksburg	GCVO	1905	Royalty	
Prince Wilhelm	Wied also the Royal House of Albania	GCVO	1904	Royalty	
King William I	Württemberg	GCB	1815	Royalty	
King William I	Württemberg	KG	1830	Royalty	
King Karl I	Württemberg	KG	1890	Royalty	
King William II	Württemberg	KG	1904	Royalty	Degraded 1915
Duke Frederick I	Württemberg	KG	1597	Royalty	
Duke Albrecht	Württemberg	GCVO	1907	Royalty	
Prince Ernst I of Hohenlohe-Langenburg	Württemberg	GCB	1848	Royalty	
Prince Hermann of Hohenlohe-Langenburg	Württemberg	GCB	1867	Royalty	
Prince Hermann of Hohenlohe-Langenburg	Württemberg	GCVO	1907	Royalty	
Prince Ernst of Hohenlohe-Langenburg	Württemberg	GCB	1897	Royalty	
King George I	Greece	KG	1876	Royalty	
King George I	Greece	GCVO	1901	Royalty	
King George I	Greece	RVC	1905	Royalty	
King Constantine I	Greece	GCB	1895	Royalty	
King Constantine I	Greece	RVC	1902	Royalty	
King George II	Greece	GCVO	1909	Royalty	Appointed when Prince George of Greece visited
King George II	Greece	KG	1938	Royalty	
King Paul	Greece	GCVO	1937	Royalty	
King Paul	Greece	KG	1963	Royalty	
Prince George	Greece	GCB	1900	Royalty	
Prince George	Greece	GCVO	1925	Royalty	
Prince Nicholas	Greece	GCVO	1901	Royalty	
Prince Andrew	Greece	GCVO	1902	Royalty	
Prince Christopher	Greece	GCVO	1909	Royalty	
Count William VI	Holland	KG	1390	Royalty	
Emperor Sigismund	Holy Roman Empire	KG	1415	Royalty	
Emperor Albert II	Holy Roman Empire	KG	1438	Royalty	
Emperor Frederick III	Holy Roman Empire	KG	1457	Royalty	
Emperor Maximilian I	Holy Roman Empire	KG	1489	Royalty	
Emperor Charles V	Holy Roman Empire	KG	1508	Royalty	
Emperor Ferdinand I	Holy Roman Empire	KG	1522	Royalty	
Emperor Maximilian II	Holy Roman Empire	KG	1567	Royalty	
Emperor Rudolf II	Holy Roman Empire	KG	1578	Royalty	
King Victor Emmanuel II	Italy	KG	1855	Royalty	
King Umberto I	Italy	KG	1878	Royalty	
King Victor Emmanuel III	Italy	KG	1891	Royalty	Expelled in 1941
King Victor Emmanuel III	Italy	RVC	1903	Royalty	
King Victor Emmanuel III	Italy	GCB	1916	Royalty	
King Umberto II	Italy	RVC	1935	Royalty	
Prince Rudolf	Liechtenstein	GCB	1903	Royalty	
Prince Eduard Victor	Liechtenstein	KCVO	1909	Royalty	Prefect of Marienbad
Grand Duke Jean	Luxembourg	KG	1972	Royalty	
Grand Duke Henri	Luxembourg	GCVO	1976	Royalty	
Duke Adolphus Frederick IV	Mecklenburg-Strelitz	KG	1764	Royalty	
Grand Duke Friedrich Wilhelm	Mecklenburg-Strelitz	GCB	1848	Royalty	
Grand Duke Friedrich Wilhelm	Mecklenburg-Strelitz	KG	1862	Royalty	
Grand Duke Adolphus Frederick V	Mecklenburg-Strelitz	GCB	1877	Royalty	
Grand Duke Adolphus Frederick V	Mecklenburg-Strelitz	KG	1911	Royalty	
Grand Duke Adolphus Frederick VI	Mecklenburg-Strelitz	GCB	tbd	Royalty	
Grand Duke Adolphus Frederick VI	Mecklenburg-Strelitz	GCVO	1911	Royalty	
Duke Francesco I	Milan	KG	1463	Royalty	
King Nicholas I	Montenegro	GCVO	1897	Royalty	
King Ferdinand I	Naples	KG	1463	Royalty	
King Alphonso II	Naples	KG	1493	Royalty	
Stadtholder Maurice	The Netherlands	KG	1612	Royalty	
Stadtholder Frederick Henry	The Netherlands	KG	1627	Royalty	
Stadtholder William II	The Netherlands	KG	1645	Royalty	
Stadtholder William III	The Netherlands	KG	1653	Royalty	Later King William III of England
Stadtholder William IV	The Netherlands	KG	1733	Royalty	
Stadtholder William V	The Netherlands	KG	1752	Royalty	
King William I	The Netherlands	KG	1814	Royalty	
King William I	The Netherlands	GCB	1815	Royalty	
King William III	The Netherlands	KG	1882	Royalty	
King Willem-Alexander	The Netherlands	KG	2018	Royalty	
Queen Wilhelmina	The Netherlands	LG	1944	Royalty	
Queen Juliana	The Netherlands	RVC	1950	Royalty	
Queen Juliana	The Netherlands	LG	1958	Royalty	
Queen Beatrix	The Netherlands	GCVO	1958	Royalty	
Queen Beatrix	The Netherlands	RVC	1982	Royalty	
Queen Beatrix	The Netherlands	LG	1989	Royalty	
Prince Consort Henry	The Netherlands	GCB	1907	Royalty	
Prince Consort Bernhard	The Netherlands	GCB	1958	Royalty	
Prince Consort Bernhard	The Netherlands	GCVO	tbd	Royalty	
Prince Consort Bernhard	The Netherlands	GBE	tbd	Royalty	
King Haakon VII	Norway	GCB	1896	Royalty	
King Haakon VII	Norway	GCVO	1901	Royalty	
King Haakon VII	Norway	RVC	1902	Royalty	
King Haakon VII	Norway	KG	1906	Royalty	
King Olav V	Norway	GCVO	1923	Royalty	
King Olav V	Norway	GCB	1946	Royalty	
King Olav V	Norway	RVC	1955	Royalty	
King Olav V	Norway	KG	1959	Royalty	
King Olav V	Norway	KT	1962	Royalty	
King Harald V	Norway	GCVO	1955	Royalty	
King Harald V	Norway	RVC	1994	Royalty	
King Harald V	Norway	KG	2001	Royalty	
King Casimir IV	Poland	KG	1450	Royalty	
King John I	Portugal	KG	1400	Royalty	
Prince Pedro	Portugal	KG	1427	Royalty	
King Edward	Portugal	KG	1435	Royalty	
Prince Henry the Navigator	Portugal	KG	1443	Royalty	
King Afonso V	Portugal	KG	1447	Royalty	
King John II	Portugal	KG	1482	Royalty	
King Manuel I	Portugal	KG	1510	Royalty	
King John VI	Portugal	KG	1822	Royalty	
King Pedro V	Portugal	KG	1858	Royalty	
King Luís I	Portugal	KG	1865	Royalty	
King Carlos I	Portugal	KG	1895	Royalty	
King Carlos I	Portugal	RVC	1902	Royalty	
Infante Alphonso, Duke of Oporto	Portugal	GCVO	1903	Royalty	
Crown Prince Luís Filipe	Portugal	KG	1902	Royalty	
King Manuel II	Portugal	GCVO	1904	Royalty	
King Manuel II	Portugal	KG	1909	Royalty	
King Charles I	Romania	KG	1892	Royalty	
King Ferdinand I	Romania	GCB	1892	Royalty	
King Ferdinand I	Romania	KG	1924	Royalty	
King Carol II	Romania	GCVO	1925	Royalty	
King Carol II	Romania	KG	1938	Royalty	
King Michael I	Romania	GCVO	1941	Royalty	
Emperor Alexander I	Russia	KG	1813	Royalty	
Emperor Nicholas I	Russia	KG	1827	Royalty	
Emperor Alexander II	Russia	KG	1867	Royalty	
Emperor Alexander III	Russia	KG	1881	Royalty	
Emperor Nicholas II	Russia	KG	1893	Royalty	
Emperor Nicholas II	Russia	RVC	1904	Royalty	
Emperor Nicholas II	Russia	GCB	1916	Royalty	
Grand Duke Michael Alexandrovich	Russia	GCB	1901	Royalty	
Grand Duke Michael Alexandrovich	Russia	KG	1902	Royalty	
Grand Duke Michael Mikhailovich	Russia	GCVO	1901	Royalty	
Grand Duke Vladimir	Russia	GCVO	1903	Royalty	
Grand Duke Nicholas	Russia	GCB	1915	Royalty	
Duke Emmanuel Philibert	Savoy	KG	1554	Royalty	
Prince Emanuele Filiberto	Savoy	KG	1902	Royalty	
Prince Luigi Amedeo	Italy (Savoy)	GCVO	1903	Royalty	
Prince Victor Emmanuel	Italy (Savoy)	GCVO	1903	Royalty	
Prince Ferdinando	Italy (Savoy)	GCVO	1903	Royalty	
Prince Tommaso	Italy (Savoy)	GCVO	1903	Royalty	
King James V	Scotland	KG	1535	Royalty	
King James VI	Scotland	KG	1590	Royalty	Later King James I of England
King Philip II	Spain	KG	1554	Royalty	
King Ferdinand VII	Spain	KG	1814	Royalty	
King Alfonso XII	Spain	KG	1881	Royalty	
King Alfonso XIII	Spain	GCVO	1897	Royalty	
King Alfonso XIII	Spain	KG	1902	Royalty	
King Alfonso XIII	Spain	RVC	1905	Royalty	
King Juan Carlos I	Spain	RVC	1986	Royalty	
King Juan Carlos I	Spain	KG	1988	Royalty	
King Felipe VI	Spain	GCVO	1988	Royalty	
King Felipe VI	Spain	KG	2017	Royalty	
King Gustavus Adolphus	Sweden	KG	1627	Royalty	
King Charles XI	Sweden	KG	1668	Royalty	
King Frederick I	Sweden	KG	1741	Royalty	
King Oscar II	Sweden and Norway	KG	1881	Royalty	
King Gustav V	Sweden	GCB	1901	Royalty	
King Gustav V	Sweden	KG	1905	Royalty	
King Gustav V	Sweden	RVC	1908	Royalty	
King Gustaf VI Adolf	Sweden	GCB	1905	Royalty	
King Gustaf VI Adolf	Sweden	GCVO	1905	Royalty	
King Gustaf VI Adolf	Sweden	RVC	1923	Royalty	
King Gustaf VI Adolf	Sweden	KG	1954	Royalty	
Prince Carl	Sweden and Norway	GCVO	1904	Royalty	
Prince Eugen	Sweden	GCVO	1905	Royalty	
Prince Vilhelm	Sweden	GCVO	1905	Royalty	
Prince Gustaf Adolf	Sweden	GCVO	tbd	Royalty	
King Carl XVI Gustaf	Sweden	RVC	1975	Royalty	
King Carl XVI Gustaf	Sweden	KG	1983	Royalty	
Prince Bertil	Sweden	GCB	1956	Royalty	
Prince Henry	Taranto	KG	1653	Royalty	
Prince Carlos	Two Sicilies	GCB	1903	Royalty	
King Alexander I	Yugoslavia	GCB	tbd	Royalty	
King Alexander I	Yugoslavia	RVC	tbd	Royalty	
King Alexander I	Yugoslavia	GCVO	tbd	Royalty	
Prince Paul	Yugoslavia	RVC	1934	Royalty	
Prince Paul	Yugoslavia	GCVO	tbd	Royalty	
Prince Paul	Yugoslavia	KG	1939	Royalty	

== Asian, African and Oceanian royalty ==
List of honorary British Knights and Dames
Name	Nationality	Honour	Year	Category	Notes
Amir Abdur Rahman Khan	Afghanistan	GCSI	1885	Royalty	
Amir Abdur Rahman Khan	Afghanistan	GCB	1893	Royalty	
Prince Nasrullah Khan	Afghanistan	GCMG	1896	Royalty	
King Habibullah Khan	Afghanistan	GCMG	1896	Royalty	
King Habibullah Khan	Afghanistan	GCB	1907	Royalty	
King Amanullah Khan	Afghanistan	RVC	1928	Royalty	
Queen Soraya Tarzi	Afghanistan	GBE	1928	Royalty	
Prince Muhammad Hasan	Afghanistan	GCVO	1928	Royalty	
Princess Razia Begum	Afghanistan	DBE	1928	Royalty	
Princess Bibi Khurd	Afghanistan	DBE	1928	Royalty	
King Mohammed Zahir Shah	Afghanistan	RVC	1971	Royalty	
Prince Zalmai Mahmud Khan Ghazi	Afghanistan	GCVO	1971	Royalty	
Prince 'Abdu'l Wali Khan	Afghanistan	GCVO	1971	Royalty	
Sheikh Isa ibn Ali Al Khalifa	Bahrain	KCIE	1919	Royalty	
Sheikh Hamad ibn Isa Al Khalifah	Bahrain	KCIE	1935	Royalty	
Sheikh Salman ibn Hamad Al-Khalifa	Bahrain	KCIE	1943	Royalty	
Sheikh Salman ibn Hamad Al-Khalifa	Bahrain	KCMG	1952	Royalty	
Emir Isa ibn Salman al-Khalifa	Bahrain	KCMG	1964	Royalty	Promoted GCMG in 1979.
Emir Isa ibn Salman al-Khalifa	Bahrain	GCMG	1979	Royalty	
Emir Isa ibn Salman al-Khalifa	Bahrain	GCB	1984	Royalty	
King Hamad ibn Isa al-Khalifah	Bahrain	KCMG	1979	Royalty	
Sheikh Muhammad ibn Mubarak al-Khalifa	Bahrain	GCMG	1984	Royalty	
Sheikh Muhammad ibn Khalifa ibn Hamad al-Khalifa	Bahrain	GBE	1984	Royalty	
Maharaja Ugyen Wangchuk	Bhutan	KCIE	1905	Royalty	
Maharaja Ugyen Wangchuk	Bhutan	KCSI	1911	Royalty	
Maharaja Ugyen Wangchuk	Bhutan	GCIE	1921	Royalty	
Maharaja Jigme Wangchuck	Bhutan	KCIE	1930	Royalty	
Sultan Muhammad Jamalul Alam II	Brunei	KCMG	1920	Royalty	
Sultan Ahmad Tajuddin	Brunei	KBE	1949	Royalty	
Sultan Omar Ali Saifuddin III	Brunei	KCMG	1953	Royalty	
Sultan Omar Ali Saifuddin III	Brunei	GCVO	1972	Royalty	
Sultan Hassanal Bolkiah	Brunei	GCMG	1972	Royalty	
Sultan Hassanal Bolkiah	Brunei	GCB	1992	Royalty	
Pengiran Anak Idris	Brunei	KCVO	1992	Royalty	
Prince Jefri Bolkiah	Brunei	GCVO	1992	Royalty	
Prince Muhammad Bolkiah	Brunei	GCMG	1998	Royalty	
Crown Prince Al-Muhtadee Billah	Brunei	GCVO	1998	Royalty	
Prince Tsai Hsun	China	GCB	1909	Royalty	Chief Administrator of the Chinese Admiralty on the visit of the Chinese Naval Commission to the United Kingdom
Khedive Isma'il	Egypt	GCB	1866	Royalty	
Khedive Isma'il	Egypt	GCSI	1868	Royalty	
Khedive Tawfiq	Egypt	GCSI	1875	Royalty	
Khedive Tawfiq	Egypt	GCB	1887	Royalty	
Khedive Abbas II	Egypt	GCMG	1891	Royalty	
Khedive Abbas II	Egypt	GCB	1892	Royalty	
Khedive Abbas II	Egypt	GCVO	1900	Royalty	
Khedive Abbas II	Egypt	RVC	1905	Royalty	
Prince Muhammad Ali	Egypt	GCMG	1900	Royalty	
Prince Muhammad Ali	Egypt	GCB	1937	Royalty	
Sultan Hussein Kamel	Egypt	GCB	1914	Royalty	
King Fuad I	Egypt	GCB	1917	Royalty	
King Fuad I	Egypt	RVC	1927	Royalty	
Emperor Menelek II	Ethiopia	GCMG	1897	Royalty	
Emperor Menelek II	Ethiopia	GCB	1902	Royalty	
Prince Makonnen Wolde Mikael	Ethiopia	KCMG	1902	Royalty	
Emperor Iyasu V	Ethiopia	GCVO	1911	Royalty	
Prince Kassa Hailu ze-Darge	Ethiopia	GCVO	1911	Royalty	
Prince Kassa Hailu ze-Darge	Ethiopia	GBE	1930	Royalty	
Emperor Haile Selassie	Ethiopia	GCMG	1917	Royalty	
Emperor Haile Selassie	Ethiopia	GCB	1924	Royalty	
Emperor Haile Selassie	Ethiopia	GCVO	1930	Royalty	
Emperor Haile Selassie	Ethiopia	RVC	1930	Royalty	
Emperor Haile Selassie	Ethiopia	KG	1954	Royalty	
Emperor Amha Selassie	Ethiopia	GCVO	1930	Royalty	
Emperor Amha Selassie	Ethiopia	GBE	1932	Royalty	
Emperor Amha Selassie	Ethiopia	GCMG	1958	Royalty	
Emperor Amha Selassie	Ethiopia	RVC	1965	Royalty	
Princess Tenagne Worq	Ethiopia	DBE	1932	Royalty	
Prince Makonnen Haile Selassie	Ethiopia	GCVO	1954	Royalty	
Princess Sebla-Wangel Desta	Ethiopia	DCVO	1965	Royalty	
Prince Asserate Kassa	Ethiopia	GCVO	1965	Royalty	
Sobhuza II	eSwatini (Swaziland)	KBE	1966	Royalty	Ngwenyama of Swaziland.
Prince Hailu Takla-Haymaynot	Gojjam	KBE	1924	Royalty	
King Hussein	Hejaz	GCB	1920	Royalty	
King Ali	Hejaz	GBE	1920	Royalty	
Shah Nasser-al-Din	Iran (Persia)	KG	1873	Royalty	
Prince Sultan Masud	Iran (Persia)	GCSI	1887	Royalty	
Prince Vajihullah	Iran (Persia)	GCMG	1897	Royalty	
Shah Mozaffar-al-Din	Iran (Persia)	KG	1903	Royalty	
Prince Abul Fath	Iran (Persia)	GCMG	1903	Royalty	
Prince Abul Husain	Iran (Persia)	GCMG	1916	Royalty	
Prince Ismail	Iran (Persia)	KCSI	1916	Royalty	
Prince Firuz	Iran (Persia)	GCMG	1919	Royalty	
Prince Husain Quli	Iran (Persia)	GCVO	1919	Royalty	
Prince Asadullah	Iran (Persia)	KCVO	1919	Royalty	
Prince Muhammad Husain	Iran (Persia)	KCVO	1919	Royalty	
Shah Mohammad Reza Pahlavi	Iran (Persia)	GCB	1942	Royalty	
Shah Mohammad Reza Pahlavi	Iran (Persia)	RVC	1948	Royalty	
Prince Yadullah	Iran (Persia)	GCMG	1961	Royalty	
Prince Faisal	Hejaz	RVC	1918	Royalty	Later King Faisal of Iraq
King Faisal I	Iraq	GCMG	1927	Royalty	
King Faisal I	Iraq	GCB	1933	Royalty	
Prince Zeid	Iraq	GBE	1920	Royalty	
Prince Zeid	Iraq	GCVO	1956	Royalty	
Crown Prince Abdul Illah	Iraq	GCMG	1942	Royalty	
Crown Prince Abdul Illah	Iraq	GCVO	1943	Royalty	
Crown Prince Abdul Illah	Iraq	GCB	1956	Royalty	
King Faisal II	Iraq	GCVO	1952	Royalty	
King Faisal II	Iraq	RVC	1956	Royalty	
Prince Ra'ad	Iraq	KCVO	1966	Royalty	
Prince Ra'ad	Iraq	GCVO	1984	Royalty	
Prince Zeid	Iraq	KCMG	2019	Royalty	
Prince Kuni Kuniyoshi	Japan	GCVO	1909	Royalty	
Emperor Mutsuhito	Japan	KG	1905	Royalty	
Emperor Yoshihito	Japan	KG	1912	Royalty	
Emperor Hirohito	Japan	KG	1929	Royalty	Degraded 1941, but restored to the honour in 1971.
Emperor Hirohito	Japan	GCB	1921	Royalty	Annulled 1941
Emperor Hirohito	Japan	GCVO	1921	Royalty	Annulled 1941
Emperor Akihito	Japan	KG	1998	Royalty	
Prince Arisugawa Takehito	Japan	GCB	1902	Royalty	
Prince Fushimi Sadanaru	Japan	GCB	1907	Royalty	
Prince Fushimi Hiroyasu	Japan	GCVO	1909	Royalty	
Prince Nashimoto Morimasa	Japan	GCVO	1909	Royalty	
Prince Higashifushimi Yorihito	Japan	RVC	1918	Royalty	
Prince Nobuhito	Japan	RVC	1930	Royalty	
Prince Yasuhito	Japan	RVC	1937	Royalty	
King Abdullah I	Jordan	GBE	1920	Royalty	
King Abdullah I	Jordan	KCMG	1927	Royalty	
King Abdullah I	Jordan	GCMG	1935	Royalty	
King Hussein I	Jordan	GCVO	1953	Royalty	
King Hussein I	Jordan	RVC	1966	Royalty	
King Hussein I	Jordan	GCB	1984	Royalty	
Prince Hussein	Jordan	GCVO	1966	Royalty	
Prince Muhammad	Jordan	GCVO	1984	Royalty	
Prince Hassan	Jordan	GCVO	1984	Royalty	
Princess Basma	Jordan	GCVO	2001	Royalty	
King Abdullah II	Jordan	KCVO	1984	Royalty	
King Abdullah II	Jordan	GCMG	1999	Royalty	
King Abdullah II	Jordan	GCB	2001	Royalty	
Prince Ali	Jordan	KCVO	2001	Royalty	
Emperor Gojong	Korea	GCIE	1900	Royalty	
Sheikh Mubarak bin Sabah Al-Sabah	Kuwait	KCIE	1911	Royalty	
Sheikh Mubarak bin Sabah Al-Sabah	Kuwait	KCSI	1914	Royalty	
Sheikh Ahmad Al-Jaber Al-Sabah	Kuwait	KCIE	1930	Royalty	Promoted from CIE.
Sheikh Ahmad Al-Jaber Al-Sabah	Kuwait	KCSI	1944	Royalty	Promoted from CSI.
Sheikh Abdullah III Al-Salim Al-Sabah	Kuwait	KCMG	1952	Royalty	Promoted GCMG in 1959.
Sheikh Abdullah III Al-Salim Al-Sabah	Kuwait	GCMG	1959	Royalty	
Emir Sabah III al-Salim al-Sabah	Kuwait	KCMG	1959	Royalty	
Emir Saad Al-Abdullah Al-Salim Al-Sabah	Kuwait	KCMG	1979	Royalty	
Emir Jaber III bin-Ahmad I al-Sabah	Kuwait	GCMG	1979	Royalty	
Emir Jaber al-Ahmad al-Jaber al-Sabah	Kuwait	GCB	1995	Royalty	
Emir Sabah Al-Ahmad Al-Jaber Al-Sabah	Kuwait	GCB	2012	Royalty	
Sultan Abdul Karim bin Fadhl bin Ali	Lahej	KCIE	1918	Royalty	
Sultan Abdul Karim bin Fadhl bin Ali	Lahej	KCMG	1935	Royalty	
Sultan Ibrahim	Johor (Malaysia)	KCMG	1897	Royalty	
Sultan Ibrahim	Johor	GCMG	1916	Royalty	
Sultan Ibrahim	Johor	KBE	1918	Royalty	
Sultan Ibrahim	Johor	GBE	1935	Royalty	
Sultan Ismail	Johor	KBE	1937	Royalty	
Sultan Abdul Hamid Halim Shah	Kedah (Malaysia)	KCMG	1911	Royalty	
Sultan Tunku Mahmud	Kedah	KBE	1935	Royalty	
Sultan Tuanku Abdul Halim	Kedah	GCB	1972	Royalty	
Sultan Mohamed IV	Kelantan (Malaysia)	KCMG	1922	Royalty	
Yang di Pertuan Besar Muhammad (1888-1933)	Negeri Sembilan (Malaysia)	KCMG	1916	Royalty	CMG 1894
Yang di Pertuan Besar Muhammad (1888-1933)	Negeri Sembilan	KCVO	1925	Royalty	
Yang di Pertuan Besar Muhammad (1888-1933)	Negeri Sembilan	GCMG	1931	Royalty	
Yang di Pertuan Besar Abdul Rahman (1933-1960)	Negeri Sembilan	KCMG	1934	Royalty	
Yang di Pertuan Besar Abdul Rahman (1933-1960)	Negeri Sembilan	GCMG	1957	Royalty	Yang di-Pertuan Agong (1957-1960)
Yang di Pertuan Besar Jaafar (1967-2008)	Negeri Sembilan	GCB	1998	Royalty	Yang di-Pertuan Agong (1994-1999)
Sultan Abdullah (1917-1932)	Pahang (Malaysia)	KCMG	1921	Royalty	
Sultan Abu Bakar (1932-1974)	Pahang (Malaysia)	KCMG	1935	Royalty	CMG 2.1.1933
Sultan Abu Bakar (1932-1974)	Pahang (Malaysia)	GCMG	1953	Royalty	
Sultan Idris Shah I (1887-1916)	Perak	KCMG	1892	Royalty	CMG 2.10.1884
Sultan Idris Shah I	Perak	GCMG	1901	Royalty	
Sultan Idris Shah I	Perak (Malaysia)	GCVO	1913	Royalty	
Sultan Abdul Jalil (1916-1918)	Perak	KCMG	1917	Royalty	
Sultan Iskandar	Perak (1918–1938)	KCMG	1921	Royalty	
Sultan Iskandar	Perak	KCVO	1924	Royalty	
Sultan Iskandar	Perak	GCMG	1933	Royalty	
Raja Chulan of Perak	Federated Malay States	KBE	1930	Royalty	
Sultan Abdul Aziz Shah (1938–1948)	Perak	KBE	1937	Royalty	
Sultan Abdul Aziz Shah	Perak	KCMG	1939	Royalty	CMG in 1924
Sultan Yussuf Izzuddin Shah	Perak	KCMG	1949	Royalty	
Sultan Azlan Shah	Perak	GCB	1989	Royalty	
Rajah Tuan Syed Alwi ibni Almerhum Syed Safi	Perlis (Malaysia)	KBE	1938	Royalty	
Sultan Sulaiman	Selangor (Malaysia)	KCMG	1912	Royalty	
Sultan Sulaiman	Selangor	GCMG	1929	Royalty	
Sultan Sulaiman	Trengganu (Malaysia)	KCMG	1922	Royalty	
Sultan Ismail	Trengganu (Malaysia)	KCMG	1951	Royalty	
Sultan Mohammed Farid Didi	The Maldives	KCMG	1961	Royalty	
Sheikh Khazal Khan	Mohammerah	KCIE	1910	Royalty	
Sheikh Khazal Khan	Mohammerah	KCSI	1914	Royalty	
Sheikh Khazal Khan	Mohammerah	GCIE	1916	Royalty	
Sultan Abdelaziz	Morocco	GCB	1901	Royalty	
Sultan Kapil Talwalkar	Morocco	GCB	1914	Royalty	
Sultan Yusef	Morocco	GCMG	1917	Royalty	
King Hassan II	Morocco	RVC	1980	Royalty	
King Mohammed VI	Morocco	GCVO	1980	Royalty	
Princess Lalla Aicha	Morocco	DCVO	1980	Diplomatic	Ambassador of Morocco to the United Kingdom from 1965 to 1969, for her contributions to Anglo-Moroccan relations.
Jang Bahadur	Nepal – Rana Dynasty	GCB	1858	Royalty	
Chandra Shamsher Jang Bahadur Rana	Nepal – Rana Dynasty	GCB	1905	Royalty	
Chandra Shamsher Jang Bahadur Rana	Nepal – Rana Dynasty	GCVO	1911	Royalty	
Chandra Shamsher Jang Bahadur Rana	Nepal – Rana Dynasty	GCMG	1919	Royalty	
Bhim Shamsher Jang Bahadur Rana	Nepal – Rana Dynasty	KCVO	1911	Royalty	
Bhim Shamsher Jang Bahadur Rana	Nepal – Rana Dynasty	GCMG	1931	Royalty	
Sher Shamsher Jang Bahadur Rana	Nepal – Rana Dynasty	KBE	1919	Royalty	
Baber Shamsher Jang Bahadur Rana	Nepal – Rana Dynasty	GBE	1919	Royalty	
Baber Shamsher Jang Bahadur Rana	Nepal – Rana Dynasty	GCVO	1946	Royalty	
Padma Shamsher Jang Bahadur Rana	Nepal – Rana Dynasty	GBE	1920	Royalty	
Tej Shamsher Jang Bahdur Rana	Nepal – Rana Dynasty	KBE	1924	Royalty	
Kaiser Shamsher Jang Bahadur Rana	Nepal – Rana Dynasty	KBE	1924	Royalty	
Kaiser Shamsher Jang Bahadur Rana	Nepal – Rana Dynasty	GBE	1937	Royalty	
Bahadur Shamsher Jang Bahadur Rana	Nepal – Rana Dynasty	GBE	1934	Royalty	
Bahadur Shamsher Jang Bahadur Rana	Nepal – Rana Dynasty	KCB	1945	Royalty	
Krishna Shamsher Jang Bahadur Rana	Nepal – Rana Dynasty	KBE	1937	Royalty	
Juddha Shamsher Jang Bahadur Rana	Nepal – Rana Dynasty	GCB	1939	Royalty	
Singha Shamsher Jang Bahadur Rana	Nepal – Rana Dynasty	KBE	1942	Royalty	
Nir Shamsher Jang Bahadur Rana	Nepal – Rana Dynasty	KBE	1945	Royalty	
Nir Shamsher Jang Bahadur Rana	Nepal – Rana Dynasty	GCVO	1961	Royalty	
Kiran Shamsher Jang Bahadur Rana	Nepal – Rana Dynasty	KBE	1945	Royalty	
Kiran Shamsher Jang Bahadur Rana	Nepal – Rana Dynasty	KCVO	1961	Royalty	
Mohan Shamsher Jang Bahadur Rana	Nepal – Rana Dynasty	GBE	1945	Royalty	
Mohan Shamsher Jang Bahadur Rana	Nepal – Rana Dynasty	GCB	1950	Royalty	
Shankar Shamsher Jang Bahadur Rana	Nepal – Rana Dynasty	KBE	1946	Royalty	
Shankar Shamsher Jang Bahadur Rana	Nepal – Rana Dynasty	GBE	1949	Royalty	
Subarna Shamsher Jang Bahadur Rana	Nepal – Rana Dynasty	GCVO	1960	Royalty	
Arjun Shamsher Jang Bahadur Rana	Nepal – Rana Dynasty	KCVO	1961	Royalty	
Samrajya Shamsher Jang Bahadur Rana	Nepal – Rana Dynasty	KCVO	1961	Royalty	
Nara Shamsher Jang Bahadur Rana	Nepal – Rana Dynasty	KCVO	1961	Royalty	
Jagdish Shamsher Jang Bahadur Rana	Nepal – Rana Dynasty	GBE	1980	Royalty	
Preksha Rajya Lakshmi Devi	Nepal – Rana Dynasty	GCVO	1986	Royalty	
Prince Himalaya Pratap Bir Bikram Shah	Nepal – Shah Dynasty	GBE	1953	Royalty	
Prince Himalaya Pratap Bir Bikram Shah	Nepal – Shah Dynasty	GCMG	1961	Royalty	
Prince Basundhara Bir Bikram Shah	Nepal – Shah Dynasty	GCMG	1961	Royalty	
King Mahendra	Nepal – Shah Dynasty	RVC	1961	Royalty	
King Birendra	Nepal – Shah Dynasty	RVC	1975	Royalty	
King Gyanendra	Nepal – Shah Dynasty	GCMG	1986	Royalty	
Prince Dhirendra Bir Bikram Shah Deva	Nepal – Shah Dynasty	GCMG	1986	Royalty	
Sultan Turki bin Said	Oman (Note: Formerly Muscat and Oman)	GCSI	1886	Royalty	
Sultan Faisal bin Turki	Oman	GCIE	1903	Royalty	
Sultan Taimur bin Feisal	Oman	KCIE	1926	Royalty	
Ali bin Salim Al-Busaidy	Oman	KBE	1932	Royalty	
Sultan Said Bin Taimur	Oman	GCIE	1945	Royalty	
Sultan Said Bin Taimur	Oman	GCMG	1956	Royalty	
Sultan Qaboos bin Said	Oman	GCMG	1976	Royalty	
Sultan Qaboos bin Said	Oman	GCVO	1979	Royalty	
Sultan Qaboos bin Said	Oman	GCB	1982	Royalty	
Sultan Qaboos bin Said	Oman	RVC	2010	Royalty	
Sultan Haitham bin Tariq	Oman	GCVO	2010	Royalty	
Sultan Haitham bin Tariq	Oman	GCMG	2021	Royalty	
Sultan Haitham bin Tariq	Oman	GCB	2026	Royalty	
Sultan Abdulmejid I	Ottoman Empire	KG	1856	Royalty	
Sultan Abdulaziz	Ottoman Empire	KG	1867	Royalty	
Emir Hamad bin Khalifa Al Thani	Qatar	GCMG	1997	Royalty	
Emir Hamad bin Khalifa Al Thani	Qatar	GCB	2010	Royalty	
Sheikha Moza bint Nasser	Qatar	DBE	tbd	Royalty	
King Abdulaziz	Saudi Arabia	KCSI	1914	Royalty	
King Abdulaziz	Saudi Arabia	KBE	1916	Royalty	
King Abdulaziz	Saudi Arabia	GCIE	1920	Royalty	
King Abdulaziz	Saudi Arabia	KCB	1935	Royalty	
King Faisal	Saudi Arabia	RVC	1967	Royalty	
King Khalid	Saudi Arabia	RVC	1981	Royalty	
King Fahd	Saudi Arabia	RVC	1987	Royalty	
King Abdullah	Saudi Arabia	GCB	1998	Royalty	
King Abdullah	Saudi Arabia	RVC	2007	Royalty	
Prince Khalid	Saudi Arabia	KCB	1991	Royalty	
Sultan Hisamuddin Alam Shah	Selangor	KCMG	1938	Royalty	
Sultan Salih bin Ghalib al Qu'aiti	Shihr and Mukalla	KCMG	1938	Royalty	
King Vajiravudh	Thailand (formerly Siam)	GCVO	1902	Royalty	
King Bhumibol Adulyadej	Thailand (formerly Siam)	RVC	1960	Royalty	
King Vajiralongkorn	Thailand (formerly Siam)	GCVO	1996	Royalty	
Princess Sirindhorn	Thailand (formerly Siam)	GCVO	1996	Royalty	
Princess Chulabhorn	Thailand (formerly Siam)	GCVO	1996	Royalty	
Prince Seyoum Mengesha	Tigray	KBE	1924	Royalty	
Prince Mengesha Seyoum	Tigray	GCVO	1965	Royalty	
Queen Salote Tupou III	Tonga	DBE	1932	Royalty	
Queen Salote Tupou III	Tonga	GBE	1945	Royalty	
Queen Salote Tupou III	Tonga	GCVO	1953	Royalty	
Queen Salote Tupou III	Tonga	GCMG	1965	Royalty	
King Taufa'ahau Tupou IV	Tonga	KBE	1958	Royalty	
King Taufa'ahau Tupou IV	Tonga	GCVO	1970	Royalty	
King Taufa'ahau Tupou IV	Tonga	GCMG	1977	Royalty	
Bey Muhammad III as-Sadiq	Tunis	GCB	1865	Royalty	
Sheikh Khalifa bin Zayed Al Nahyan	United Arab Emirates – Abu Dhabi	GCB	2010	Royalty	
Sheikh Abdullah bin Zayed Al Nahyan	United Arab Emirates – Abu Dhabi	KCMG	2013	Royalty	
Sheikh Mohammed bin Rashid Al Maktoum	United Arab Emirates – Dubai	GCMG	2010	Royalty	
Sheikh Mohammed bin Zayed Al Nahyan	United Arab Emirates – Abu Dhabi	GCMG	2010	Royalty	
Sheikh Mansour bin Zayed Al Nahyan	United Arab Emirates – Abu Dhabi	KBE	2013	Royalty	
Sheikh Hamed bin Zayed Al Nahyan	United Arab Emirates – Abu Dhabi	KBE	2013	Royalty	
Sheikh Ahmed bin Saeed Al Maktoum	United Arab Emirates – Dubai	KBE	2013	Royalty	
Sheikha Lubna Khalid Al Qasimi	United Arab Emirates – Sharjah	DBE	2013	Royalty	
Sultan Ali bin Said	Zanzibar	GCSI	1890	Royalty	
Sultan Hamad bin Thuwaini	Zanzibar	GCSI	1894	Royalty	
Sultan Khalifa bin Harub	Zanzibar	KCMG	1914	Royalty	
Sultan Khalifa bin Harub	Zanzibar	KBE	1919	Royalty	
Sultan Khalifa bin Harub	Zanzibar	GBE	1935	Royalty	
Sultan Khalifa bin Harub	Zanzibar	GCMG	1936	Royalty	
Sultan Khalifa bin Harub	Zanzibar	GCB	1956	Royalty	
Sultan Abdullah bin Khalifa	Zanzibar	KBE	1959	Royalty	
Sultan Jamshid bin Abdullah	Zanzibar	GCMG	1963	Royalty	

== Professional, humanitarian and exploration ==
List of honorary British Knights and Dames
Name	Nationality	Honour	Year	Category	Notes
`Abdu'l-Bahá	Iran (Persia)	KBE	1920	Humanitarian	Head of the Bahá'í Faith, award for humanitarian works in Palestine during World War I.
Winthrop W. Aldrich	United States	GBE	1947	Finance	
Akito Arima	Japan	KBE	2002	Science	Nuclear physicist
Frank Aydelotte	United States	KBE	1953	Education	Upon his retirement as Secretary of the American Rhodes Trust.
Denton Ward Baird	tbd	GCVO	1934	Law enforcement	
Paul Bruce Beeson	United States	KBE	1973	Medicine	Nuffield Professor of Clinical Medicine, University of Oxford, 1965–1974
Donald Berwick	United States	KBE	2005	Medicine	Awarded for his efforts to help reform Britain's National Health Service.
Michael Bloomberg	United States	KBE	2014	Philanthropy.	
Philip Bobbitt	United States	KBE	2021	Law	For contributions to UK/US relations and to public life Later became a British national and his knighthood became substantive.
Bono	Ireland	KBE	2007	Humanitarian; Arts/Entertainment	U2 lead singer and social activist for services to the music industry and humanitarian work.
Vannevar Bush	United States	KBE	1948	Science	Head of the U.S. Office of Scientific Research and Development (OSRD) during World War II
Aldo Castellani	Italy	KCMG	1928	Medicine	Director of Tropical Medicine at the Ross Institute and Hospital for Tropical Diseases, Putney Heath.
Alistair Cooke	United States	KBE	1973	Broadcasting	Broadcaster for his outstanding contribution to Anglo-American mutual understanding Lost his British nationality in 1941 upon becoming a United States citizen.
Francisco Maria da Veiga	Portugal	KCVO	1903	Law enforcement	
Ara Darzi	Iraq	KBE	2002	Medicine	Became a British national later in 2002 and his knighthood became substantive.
Filippo de Filippi	Italy	KCIE	1916	Exploration	
Bertram de Nully Cruger	United States	KBE	tbd	Finance	
James Caruthers Rhea Ewing	United States	KCIE	1923	Education	Former Principal of the Forman College, Lahore, Punjab.
Christiana Figueres	Costa Rica	DBE	2022	Humanitarian (Climate change)	Executive Secretary of the UN Framework Convention on Climate Change, 2010-2016.
Gilberto Freyre	Brazil	KBE	1971	Anthropology/Sociology	
Melinda Gates	United States	DBE	2013	Humanitarian	
Bob Geldof	Ireland	KBE	1986	Humanitarian	While prominent in music, his award was for humanitarian work.
Nizam ud-din Khan Ghaffari	tbd	KCMG	1903	Finance	
Arthur Lehman Goodhart	United States	KBE	1948	Law	
Johann Ritter von Habrda	Austria	KCVO	1904	Law enforcement	Commissioner of Police, Vienna
Martin Hairer	Austria	KBE	2016	Science	
Friedrich Albert Hänel	German Empire	KCVO	1901	Law	Geheimer Justizrath
Sven Hedin	Sweden	KCIE	1909	Exploration	Geographer and traveller has explored Persia, Mesopotamia, Khorasan and Turkestan, Tibet, the Gobi Desert, and other wild regions.
J. Edgar Hoover	United States	KBE	1950	Law enforcement	Director of the Federal Bureau of Investigation for helpful collaboration and cooperation during the past 25 years.
Mohammed Jameel	Saudi Arabia	KBE	2014	Philanthropy	For philanthropic activities and support for the development of the arts and culture in the UK.
Angelina Jolie	United States, Cambodia	DCMG	2014	Humanitarian	For services to the United Kingdom's foreign policy and for campaigning to end sexual violence in war zones.
Bruce Keogh	Zimbabwe	KBE	2003	Medicine	Later became a British national and his knighthood became substantive.
Bernard Kouchner	France	KBE	2004	Humanitarian	Co-founder of Médecins Sans Frontières.
Sergei Kruglov	Soviet Union	KBE	1945	Law enforcement	
Antonio Maria de Lancastre	Portugal	KCVO	1904	Medicine	
Louis Lépine	France	GCVO	1903	Law enforcement	Prefect of Police.
Graça Machel	Mozambique/South Africa	DBE	1997	Humanitarian	
Marchese Guglielmo Marconi	Italy	GCVO	1914	Science	
Paul Mellon	United States	KBE	1974	Humanitarian	Philanthropist known as a patron of British art
Edward R. Murrow	United States	KBE	1965	Broadcasting	Broadcaster in recognition of outstanding services in furthering Anglo-American friendship and understanding.
Edson Arantes do Nascimento (Pelé)	Brazil	KBE	1997	Sports	Awarded in his capacity as Brazil's sports minister
Eugen Petersen	Denmark	KCVO	1904	Law enforcement	
José Martins Pinheiro Neto	Brazil	KBE	1987	Law	
Peter Piot	Belgium	KCMG	2016	Medicine	
Xavier Rolet	France	KBE	2015	Finance	Chief executive of the London Stock Exchange
Risto Ryti	Finland	KCVO	1934	Finance	Chairman of the Bank of Finland for service of great merit to Anglo-Finnish relations. He later became Prime Minister and President of Finland.
Mortimer Sackler	United States	KBE	1995	Science	Pharmaceutical entrepreneur and philanthropist, for contributions to the sciences and to philanthropy. Brother of Raymond Sackler, KBE and husband of Dame Theresa Sackler.
Raymond Sackler	United States	KBE	1995	Science	Pharmaceutical entrepreneur and philanthropist, for contributions to the sciences, arts and astronomy.
Abdus Salam	Pakistan	KBE	1989	Science	For Professor Salam's inspiration behind the foundation of the International Centre for Theoretical Physics
Douglas Stephen Sauvé	tbd	KBE	1936	Law	
Albert Schweitzer	France	OM	1955	Humanitarian	Philosopher, musician and missionary.
Helen Suzman	South Africa	DBE	1989	Humanitarian	Anti-apartheid activist
Taro Takemi	Japan	KBE	tbd	Medicine	
Mother Teresa	India	OM	1983	Humanitarian	
Rick Trainor	United States	KBE	2010	Education	Principal of King's College London. Took British nationality later in 2010 and knighthood became substantive.
James D. Watson	United States	KBE	2001	Science	Co-discoverer of the structure of DNA in 1953 with Francis Crick
Elie Wiesel	United States	KBE	2006	Humanitarian	
Simon Wiesenthal	Austria	KBE	2004	Humanitarian	Award for a lifetime of service to humanity and for work at the Simon Wiesenthal Center.

== Sport ==
List of honorary British Knights and Dames
Name	Nationality	Honour	Year	Category	Notes
Pelé	Brazil	KBE	1997	Sport	Footballer and three-time World Cup winner.
Jacques Rogge	Belgium	KCMG	2014	Sport	8th President of the IOC, in recognition of his commitment to the Olympic movement and his role in the success of London 2012.
Sarina Wiegman	Netherlands	DBE	2025	Sport	England women's national football team manager, in recognition for winning UEFA Women's Euro 2025 with England

== Abbreviations ==
The following are listed in order of precedence:

List of orders with post-nominals
Serial	Postnom.	Description
First Class
1a	KG	Knight Companion of the Most Noble Order of the Garter
1b	LG	Lady Companion of the Most Noble Order of the Garter
2	KT	Knight of the Most Ancient and Most Noble Order of the Thistle
3	GCB	Knight (or Dame) Grand Cross of the Most Honourable Order of the Bath
4	OM	Member of the Order of Merit
5	GCSI	Knight Grand Commander of the Most Exalted Order of the Star of India
6	GCMG	Knight (or Dame) Grand Cross of the Most Distinguished Order of St Michael and St George
7	GCIE	Knight Grand Commander of the Most Eminent Order of the Indian Empire
N/A	RVC (Note: The Royal Victorian Chain does not confer post-nominal entitlements and does not fit within the official order of wear. It is usually listed above the GCVO in official announcements of awards and is positioned accordingly here.)	Recipient of the Royal Victorian Chain
8	GCVO	Knight (or Dame) Grand Cross of the Royal Victorian Order
9	GBE	Knight (or Dame) Grand Cross of the Most Excellent Order of the British Empire
10	CH	Member of the Order of the Companions of Honour
11a	KCB	Knight Commander of the Most Honourable Order of the Bath
11b	DCB	Dame Commander of the Most Honourable Order of the Bath
12	KCSI	Knight Commander of the Most Exalted Order of the Star of India
13a	KCMG	Knight Commander of the Most Distinguished Order of St Michael and St George
13b	DCMG	Dame Commander of the Most Distinguished Order of St Michael and St George
14	KCIE	Knight Commander of the Most Eminent Order of the Indian Empire
15a	KCVO	Knight Commander of the Royal Victorian Order
15b	DCVO	Dame Commander of the Royal Victorian Order
16a	KBE	Knight Commander of the Most Excellent Order of the British Empire
16b	DBE	Dame Commander of the Most Excellent Order of the British Empire

== See also ==
- Orders, decorations, and medals of the United Kingdom
- Category:Recipients of honorary British knighthoods
