= List of pre-nominal letters (Sweden) =

The following abbreviations in Sweden are used as pre-nominal letters (rather than post-nominal letters) after the professional title in definite form, followed by a comma, and before the full name:

- Order of the Seraphim
  - RoKavKMO/LoKavKMO - Knight/Member (of the cloth) and Commander of His Majesty's Orders (=Knight/Member (of the cloth) of the Order of Seraphim and Commander Grand Cross or Commander 1st Class of one of the orders Sword, Polar Star or Vasa, i.e. Swedish citizens)
  - RSerafO/LSerafO - Knight/Member (of the cloth) of the Royal Order of the Seraphim (=have only received the Order of the Seraphim, i.e. foreign heads of state)
- Order of the Sword:
  - Commander Grand Cross (KmstkSO)
  - Knight Grand Cross 1st Class (RmstkSO1kl) (special class, in wartimes only)
  - Knight Grand Cross 2nd Class (RmstkSO2kl) (special class, in wartimes only)
  - Commander 1st Class (KSO1kl)
  - Commander 2nd Class (KSO2kl)
  - Knight 1st Class (RSO1kl)
  - Knight (RSO)
  - Cross of Merit (Svm)
- Order of the Polar Star:
  - Commander Grand Cross (KmstkNO)
  - Commander 1st Class (KNO1kl)
  - Commander 2nd Class (KNO2kl)
  - Knight/Member (of the cloth) 1st Class (RNO1kl/LNO1kl)
  - Knight/Member (RNO/LNO)
- Order of Vasa:
  - Commander Grand Cross (KmstkVO)
  - Commander 1st Class (KVO1kl)
  - Commander 2nd Class (KVO2kl)
  - Knight/Member 1st Class (RVO1kl/LVO1kl)
  - Knight/Member (RVO/LVO)
  - Cross of Merit (Vt)
- Order of Charles XIII:
  - Knight (RCXIII:sO) (insignia and rank as Commander 1st Class)
- Order of Saint John in Sweden:
  - Knight of Justice (R-RJohO)
  - Knight (RJohO)
- Royal Swedish Academy of Sciences:
  - Fellow (LVA)

== See also ==
- Orders, decorations, and medals of Sweden
- Lists of post-nominal letters
