= List of awards and honors received by Ronald Reagan =

Ronald Reagan received numerous awards and honors before, during, and after his presidency.

== Awards ==
- Sylvanus Thayer Award by the United States Military Academy (1989)
- Naval Heritage award by the U.S. Navy Memorial Foundation (1998)
- Congressional Gold Medal by the United States Congress (July 27, 2000)

== Honors ==
- Laureate of The Lincoln Academy of Illinois (1981)
- Order of Lincoln by the governor of Illinois
- Collar of the Order of the Nile, August 8, 1981
- Distinguished Service Medal by the American Legion (1982)
- Golden Pheasant Award by the Scout Association of Japan (1983)
- Honorary knight Grand Cross of the Order of the Bath (June 14, 1989)
- Grand Cordon of the Order of the Chrysanthemum by Japan (October 23, 1989)
- Grand Cross of the Order of Merit of the Federal Republic of Germany (September 3, 1990)
- Honorary citizenship of Berlin (November 1992)
- Presidential Medal of Freedom by U.S. President George H. W. Bush (January 18, 1993)
- Republican Senatorial Medal of Freedom by Republican U.S. senators
- Grand Cross of the Order of the White Lion by the Czech Republic (1999)
- Order of the White Eagle by Polish President Lech Kaczyński (July 10, 2007) (in-memoriam)
- Labor Hall of Honor by the United States Department of Labor

== Halls of Fame ==
- Hollywood Walk of Fame (1960)
- National Speakers Association Speaker Hall of Fame
- California Hall of Fame (2006)
