= Niall FitzGerald =

Irish businessman

Niall FitzGerald (born 13 September 1945) is an Irish businessman.

== Early life and education ==
FitzGerald was born 13 September 1945 in County Sligo. FitzGerald grew up in Limerick, Ireland, and was educated at St Munchin's College in Limerick. He obtained a Commerce degree from University College, Dublin (UCD).

== Career ==
His executive career was with Unilever for 37 years. He was an executive board member for 18 years and served respectively as Finance Director, Foods Director and Detergents Director until his appointment as chairman and CEO in 1996; a position he held until 2004. During his Unilever career he worked and lived in Ireland, the Netherlands, South Africa, the United States and the United Kingdom.

FitzGerald has chaired a broad range of companies and public bodies. These include Reuters, Hakluyt, the Nelson Mandela Legacy Trust, International Business Council, Conference Board, Investment Climate Facility for Africa, British Museum, the Transatlantic Business Dialogue (TAB) and Advertising Association.

He has also served on the Boards of Bank of Ireland, Ericsson, Merck, Prudential Corporation and chaired Audit, Remuneration and Governance Committees. Other Board mandates have included the World Economic Forum, Council on Foreign Relations, International Policy Council for Agriculture and Trade, President of South Africa's International Advisory Council, Kok Commission on the Lisbon Agenda, Spencer Stuart Advisory Board.

Current engagements include Chairman, Brand Learning; Chairman, NiJaCo; Chairman, Hakluyt International Advisory Board; Chairman, Munster Rugby Commercial Board; Chairman, UCD Graduate Business School; Chairman, Leverhulme Trust; Senior Advisor, Allen & Co.; Member of Mitsubishi International Advisory Committee and Chairman of Governors at Cumnor House Sussex prep school.

== Awards and honours ==
FitzGerald was made an Honorary Knight Commander of the Order of the British Empire in 2002, and holds a number of Honorary Doctorates from American, British and Irish universities. He has also been the recipient of numerous other awards for his work on global business issues, including

- Golden Plate Award of the American Academy of Achievement (2002), received at the International Achievement Summit in Dublin, Ireland
- Society of Chemical Industry Centenary Medal (2004)
- Royal Dublin Society Gold Medal for Industry (2006)
- Woodrow Wilson Award for Corporate Citizenship (2008)
- Business & Finance Award for Outstanding Business Achievement (2008)
- Perlmutter Award for Excellence in Global Business Leadership (2011)

On 13 November 2014 FitzGerald was presented with an honorary degree in Economic Science from University of Limerick.

== Personal life ==
FitzGerald is married to Ingrid and they have a daughter, Gabriella. He has 3 children from a previous marriage.
