= José Bascarán y Federic =

Spanish army officer (1843–1924)

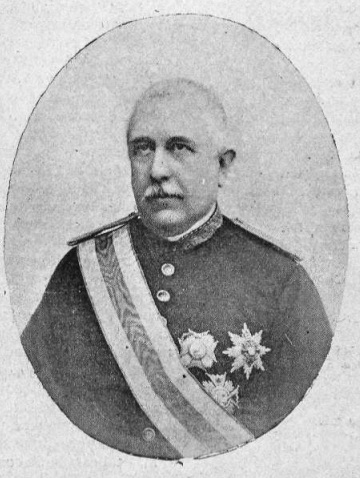
- Portrait of Bascarán published in 1899 in La Nación Militar
- Born: 5 September 1843; A Coruña, Galicia, Spanish Empire
- Died: 12 March 1924 Madrid, Spanish Empire
- Buried: Sacramental Church of San Lorenzo and San José
- Branch: Spanish Army
- Service years: 1863–1924
- Rank: Lieutenant general Major general
- Conflicts: Glorious Revolution (1866); Second Boer War (1899–1902)
- Awards: Royal and Military Order of Saint Hermenegild; Royal Family Order of Charles III; Order of Isabella the Catholic; Order of Military Merit; Order of the Black Eagle; Order of Naval Merit

José Julián de Bascarán y Federic (September 5, 1843 – March 12, 1924) was a Spanish military officer. He held various high military positions, such as head of the General Staff section of the Ministry of War, lieutenant general and major general, and second-in-command of the General Staff for operations in Africa.

== Origins ==
He was the son of Brigadier Julián Lorenzo de Bascarán y Lascurain (baptized Marquina-Jeméin, September 6, 1791) and his wife Esperanza de Federic y Miguel or Elena de Federic y Gayoso de los Cobos (baptized Madrid, April 3, 1905 – Madrid, 1882) and brother of Ángel Bascarán y Federic. His mother was the daughter of Amadeo de Federic y Álvarez de Toledo (February 15, 1755 – March 7, 1838) and his wife Ana Gayoso de los Cobos (1760) and paternal granddaughter of Carlo de Federic and his wife María Antonia Álvarez de Toledo y Fernández de Córdoba (1743), daughter of Antonio Álvarez de Toledo y Pérez de Guzmán el Bueno and his first wife Teresa Francisca Fernández de Córdoba y Spinola.

== Biography ==
At the age of 16, he entered the Special Staff School, where he later served as a professor. There he obtained the number one spot in his class and was promoted to lieutenant on July 6, 1863.

At the age of twenty-one, in February 1864, he was entrusted with the education of the children of Infante Enrique, Duke of Seville. He was promoted to captain for his brilliant conduct in the defense of Queen Isabella II during the San Gil Barracks Uprising of June 22, 1866. In August of the same year, he was appointed professor at the General Staff School. He participated in the operations undertaken by General Calonge in Santander in September 1868, and his conduct earned him the rank of commander, which the Provisional Government did not officially grant him until 1871. He later returned to his professorship at the School, where some time later he was promoted to commander. It was then that he wrote "Lessons on the Artillery Equipment to be Used in Our Army", a work declared as a textbook and for which he was awarded the rank of lieutenant colonel.

In March 1884, he was transferred, as head, to the General Staff section of the Ministry of War, where he rose to the rank of general, and in 1886 he took up the post of second-in-command of the War Depot and the Labor and Topographical Brigade, holding this position until 1892. Until May 1893, he was also chief of staff to the minister of war, moving from this post to head of the War Depot, and finally to second-in-command of the General Staff of the Army of Africa.

Around 1899, as head of the Campaign Section of the Ministry of War, he participated in the efforts to send some Spanish military attachés to the Boer Wars in support of England.

He died on March 12, 1924, at his residence in Madrid, while serving as acting head of the Military Household of King Alfonso XIII and as military governor of the military province of Madrid. He was buried in the San Lorenzo and San José Cemetery in Madrid.

=== Works ===
He was the author of works such as The Plan of Military Instruction and the Narrative of the Carlist War or Lessons on the Artillery Material that Should Be Used in Our Army.

=== Decorations ===
He received the decorations of the Royal and Military Order of Saint Hermenegild, the Royal Family Order of Charles III, Knight of the Order of Isabella the Catholic, Knight of the Order of Military Merit, Knight of the Order of the Black Eagle and Knight of the Order of Naval Merit.

=== Marriages and family ===
He married Enriqueta de Reyna y Visset-Fernández de Córdoba in 1862, daughter of José de Reyna, born in 1821, a general in the service of Spain, and his wife ... Visset-Fernández de Córdoba, with whom he had:

Antonio de Bascarán y Reyna Enrique de Bascarán y Reyna (Madrid, January 1870 - Biarritz, October 11, 1870) Isabel Amalia María de la O Josefa Nazaria María del Carmen de Bascarán y Reyna (Biarritz, July 28, 1871) María de la O de Bascarán y Reyna (Madrid, March 15, 1872), married in Madrid on January 15, 1896, to Cristóbal María del Pilar Bordiú y Prat (Anglet, October 12, 1864/6 - Sabiñán, December 17, 1907), parents among others of the 9th Marchioness of Villaverde, 14th Countess of Morata de Jalón, 7th Countess of Argillo, Baroness of Gotor, Baroness of Illueca María Eugenia de Bascarán y Reyna (1873). Jacinto de Bascarán y Reyna (1877 - Tetuán, September 3, 1915), military officer Eduardo de Bascarán y Reyna (? - Madrid, October 18, 1897)

== Bibliography ==
- Pérez Frías 2005, pp. 127–128, 137–139, 141
- García Barragán 2003, pp. 159–160
- García Barragán, María Guadalupe (2003). Universidad Autónoma de México (ed.). "Comentarios al Diario de Federico Gamboa: la embajada especial en España, 1911". Nueva época, vol. VIII, núms. 1 y 2, México, primer y segundo semestres de 2003: 137–162. ISSN 0006-1719.
- Pérez Frías, Pedro Luis (2005). Ministerio de Defensa (ed.). "Presencia española en la guerra de los boersː Un canario en tierras de África del Sur (1899-1901)" (PDF). Revista de Historia Militar (98): 127–180. ISSN 0482-5748. Archived from the original (pdf) on 17 April 2014.
