= Nikolaos Thon =

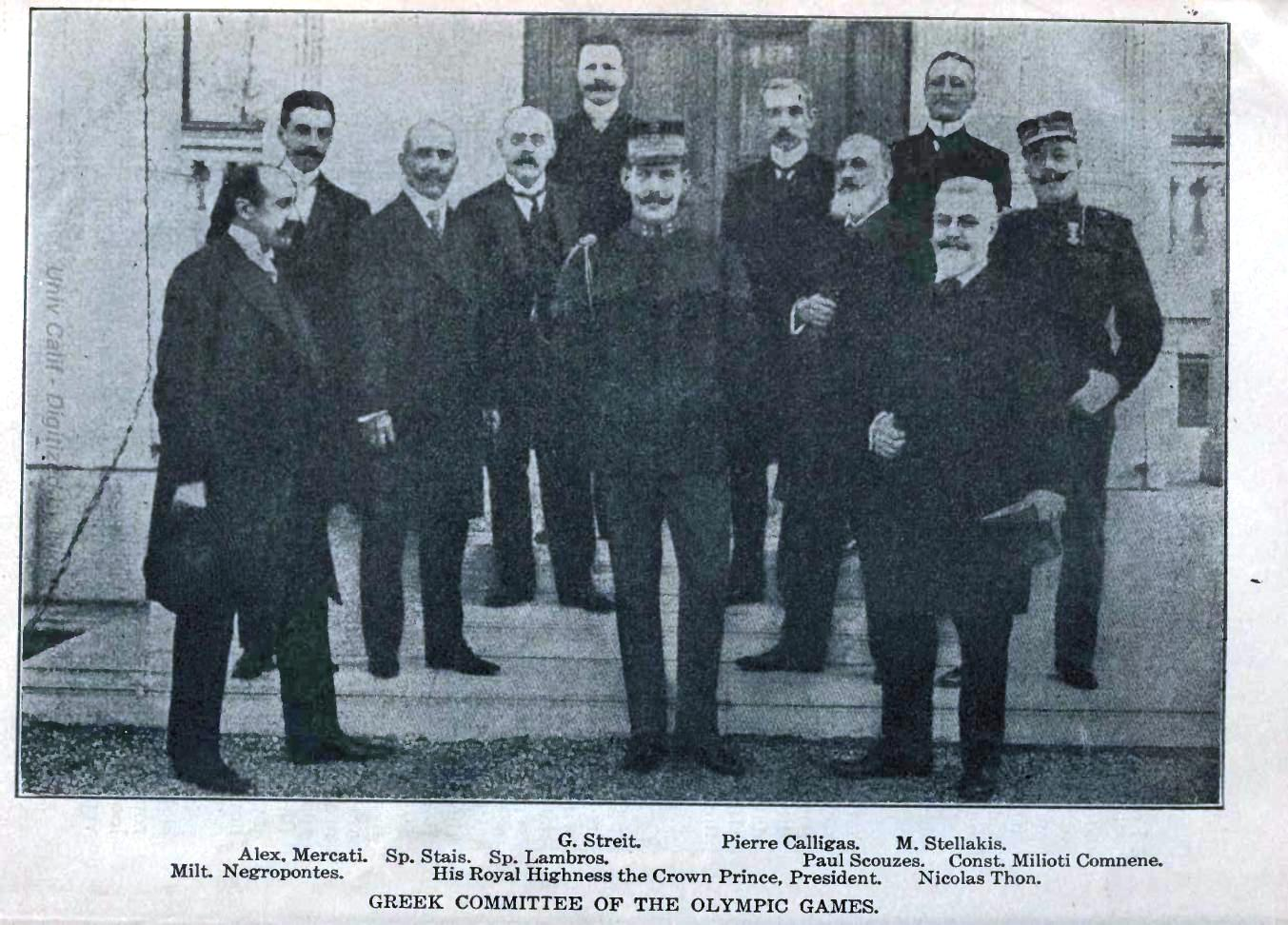
Nikolaos Thon (2nd from right), with the other members of the Organizing Committee of the 1906 Intercalated Games

Nikolaos Thon GCVO (Greek: Νικόλαος Θων; c. 1850–1906) was a Greek courtier and businessman.

He was born in Athens to a Bavarian who had come to Greece with King Otto, and his Greek wife Marigo Vogiatzi. The ownership of mines in the Cyclades helped him amass considerable fortune, and he acquired extensive properties in Attica. Among the latter are the Thon Villa in Ampelokipoi, and the so-called "Palataki" (Palacette) in Haidari.

He also provided the land on which the National Theatre of Greece was built in 1891, and served as its first director in 1900. Nikolaos Thon also financed the construction of the Chapel of St. George on Mount Lycabettus, was chairman of Panellinios G.S. and a member of the organizing committee for the 1906 Intercalated Olympic Games, and served King George I as intendant of the royal estates.
