= Pre-nominal letters =

Letters indicating a title

Pre-nominal letters are a title which is placed before the name of a person as distinct from a post-nominal title which is placed after the name. Examples of pre-nominal titles, for instance professional titles, include Doctor, Captain, EUR ING (European Engineer), Ir. (ingenieur), Ts. (professional technologist), Ar. (architect), Sr. (surveyor), Br. (certified builder), Gs. (geologist), Mons. (monsignore), Cllr (Councillor), CA (Indian chartered accountant) and Professor.

These distinctive titles replace the standard honorifics used in polite address, indicating gender and, for women, marital status; the common English forms are Mr., Ms., Mrs. and Miss. These honorifics are not normally considered as titles.

== Academic degrees ==
In some Continental European countries, all academic degrees were traditionally pre-nominal.

Pre-nominal academic degrees in German-speaking countries include: Dipl.-Ing. (Master's degree in engineering), Dipl.-Kfm. (master's degree in management), Dipl.-Phys. (master's degree in physics), Dipl.-Inf. or Dipl.-Inform. (master's degree in computer science), Dr.-Ing. (German doctorate in engineering), Dr. med. (German doctorate in Medicine) and Mag. (Austrian master's degree (Magister) in all disciplines except engineering).

Pursuant to the Bologna process, most of these pre-nominal degrees will be replaced by post-nominal bachelor's and master's degrees; but people who held academic degrees before the Bologna process may continue to use the pre-nominal academic degrees. In contexts where pre-nominal academic letters are used, such degrees may be placed prenominally for consistency (for example, "MMathPhil Marcos Cramer").

In the Czech Republic, all academic degrees are widely used before the name: Bc. – for Bachelor, Mgr. – for Master, Ing. – for Engineer, "lesser" doctors such as MUDr. (doctor of medicine), MDDr. (dentist doctor), JUDr. (doctor of Law), RNDr. (doctor of Natural Sciences), PhDr. (doctor of Philosophy), ThDr. (doctor of Theology). Before them appear titles given to university teachers (prof. for Professor and doc. for "docent" = Associated Professor). These degrees could be combined, with the highest degree appearing first, e. g. prof. JUDr. Ing. Bc. The titles of the same rank are separated by "et", e. g. Mgr. et Mgr. Army titles include gen. for General, plk. for Colonel; Church titles include P. (pater) and R.D. (Reverendissimus Dominus).

In Finland, abbreviated academic titles can appear before or after the name (for example, FM Matti Meikäläinen or Matti Meikäläinen, FM). In the United States a person may at their discretion use "Dr." as a pre-nominal or their doctoral degree's initials as a post-nominal, but rarely at the same time. It would also be very unusual to see a professional license (such as for an engineer) used as a pre-nominal in any form.

In Poland, abbreviated academic titles appear as pre-nominal letters: inż. for holders of inżynier degree (Polish equivalent for a Bachelor of Science (BSc), Bachelor of Engineering (BEng), or Bachelor of Applied Science (BASc)) awarded by a polytechnical university or faculty; mgr for holders of a Magister (Polish equivalent for a master's degree); mgr inż. for holders of a Magister awarded by a polytechnical university or faculty; dr for holders of a Doktorat (Polish Doctorate); dr inż. for holders of a Doktorat awarded by a polytechnical university or faculty; dr hab. for holders of a Doktorat and a habilitacja (Polish post-doctoral habilitation qualification); dr hab. inż. for holders of a Doktorat and a habilitacja awarded by a polytechnical university or faculty.

In Portugal and the other Portuguese-speaking countries, it is usual for a person with a university degree to be generally referred by the abbreviated pre-nominal title dr. (doutor), independently of the real degree that he or she holds. The main exceptions to this are the holders of degrees in engineering and architecture, who are referred respectively by the pre-nominal abbreviated titles eng. (engenheiro) and arq. (arquiteto).

== Order of titles ==
In the UK, those with both a knighthood and rank in the armed forces (or clergy, or academic titles) put the Sir after the other title; for example: Lieutenant General Sir William Leishman; His Eminence Sir Norman Cardinal Gilroy, KBE; Professor Sir Richard Peto.

== See also ==
- Form of address
- Honorific
- Post-nominal letters
- Suffix
- Title
