= Van Petten, Illinois =

- Unincorporated community
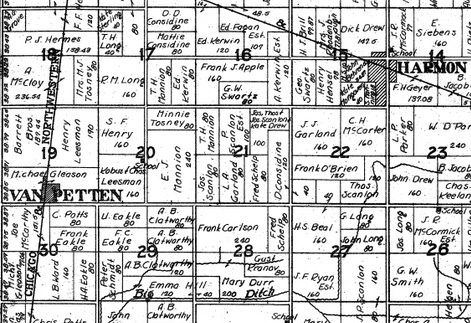
- 1926 plat map excerpt showing Van Petten and Harmon

- Location within Illinois Location within the United States
- Coordinates: 41°42′1″N 89°37′22″W
- Country: United States
- State: Illinois
- County: Lee
- Township: Harmon
- Elevation: 656 ft (200 m)
- Time zone: UTC-6 (Central (CST))
  - Summer (DST): UTC-5 (CDT)
- GNIS feature ID: 423272

Van Petten is a former rural unincorporated community in Harmon Township, Lee County, Illinois, United States. Platted in 1901 to take advantage of a new rail line through the area, the community began to decline by the late 1920s, and was reduced to two remaining residents by 2010.

== History ==
The community was named for A. G. Van Petten, the original owner of the town site. Van Petten filed a plat for the town on September 4, 1901, with four blocks of 21 lots each, contained within land he owned. The impetus for creating the town site was a new railroad line of the Peoria & Northwestern railway (part of the Chicago and North Western Railway) running south from Nelson, Illinois to Peoria, which Mr. Van Petten hoped could spur the growth of a village. A post office called Van Petten was established in 1901 and remained in operation for 30 years.

At one time, Van Petten had a general store, grain company, automobile seller and garage, and railroad station. However, the community's fortunes started going downhill in 1928, when the "popular crossroads trading center" and "thriving village" suffered a fire which destroyed the car sales store and garage and the grocery store, which were never rebuilt. And in 1932, a fire destroyed all the buildings in the lumber and coal yards, leaving only the grain elevator and rail station remaining.

By 1938, Van Petten had a population of 12, and the railroad was allowed to remove the station building and make it a pre-pay stop. The grain elevator was the only business.

By 2010, the population of the community was further reduced to two - local residents Dave and Babe Brandon who had signs posted stating "Van Petten - Population 2." According to an article published that year about the Brandons and Van Petten, they also paid town taxes to keep the town in existence, and the Brandons said they would trade off who was serving as mayor. Babe Brandon died in 2019, and Dave followed in 2021. And in 2024, a petition was filed and heard to "vacate the streets and alleys of the Town of Van Petten," effectively marking the end of its life.
