= Harriet E. Garrison =

American physician and physician writer (1848–1930)

Dr. Harriet E. Garrison
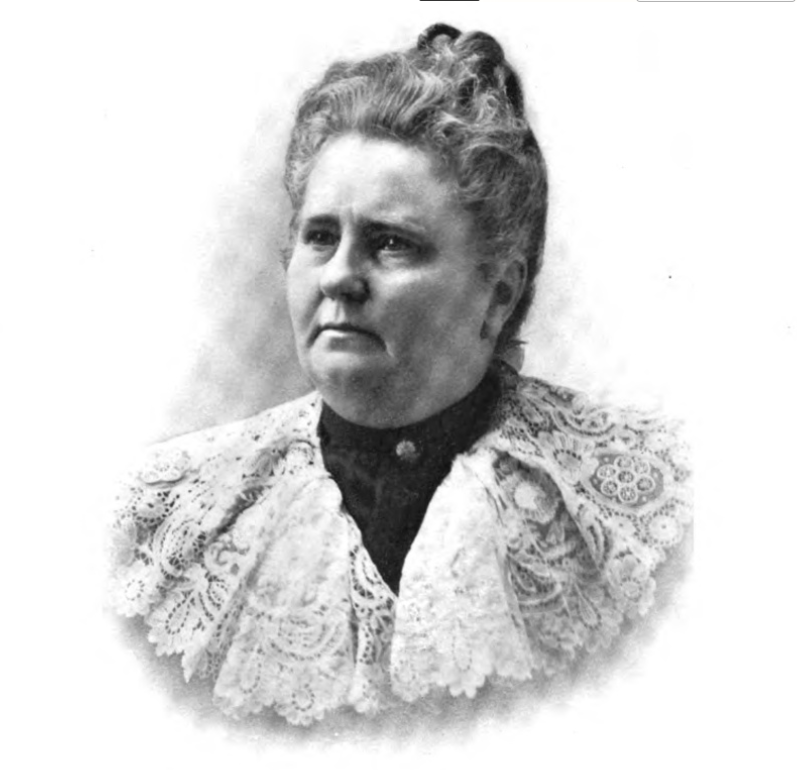
- Photo in Physicians and Surgeons of the West, 1900
- Born: October 20, 1848; Dixon, Illinois, U.S.
- Died: October 3, 1930 (aged 81)
- Resting place: Girton Cemetery, Lee County, Illinois, U.S.
- Education: Rock River Seminary; Woman's Hospital Medical College
- Occupations: physician; medical writer

Signature
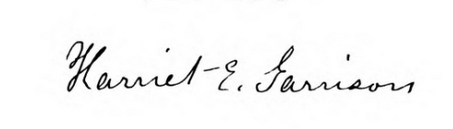

Harriet E. Garrison (October 20, 1848 – October 3, 1930) was an American physician and medical writer whose practice was based in Dixon, Illinois. She traveled widely and wrote on medical topics, presenting papers at medical conferences.

== Early life and education ==
Harriet E. Garrison was born on a farm in Dixon, Illinois, on October 20, 1848. Her parents were William Garrison and Amelia (Oman) Garrison, prosperous farmers of that county. Garrison's parents were born, raised and married in Luzerne County, Pennsylvania, and emigrated to Lee County, Illinois. There, Garrison's father followed farming for some years, but spent his last days in retirement from active labor, near Dixon, in Nachusa township, where both of Garrison's parents died and were buried. Garrison had eight siblings, including: George, Hannah, Martha, Peter, John, Harriet, William, Mamie, and Hester. The family home, located three miles east of Dixon, was known as the Big Spring Farm. It was the first land bought by William Garrison in the fall of 1845, when it was wild prairie land. He built a two story and basement brick house facing the spring.

Garrison passed her girlhood becoming skillful in domestic pursuits. For many years, she enjoyed finding a quiet nook and reading a book. Until fourteen years of age, the district school furnished her with an education. She then entered the Dixon Seminary, where she spent four months. Part of her education occurred at Rock River Seminary, at Mount Morris, Ogle county, Illinois.

At Rock River Seminary, Garrison evinced an aptitude for study of the human body. Before she became a student of anatomy and physiology, her teacher advised her to pursue a career in medicine. At the conclusion of her course in these branches, she had achieved the record of standing perfect through the entire term. But although her parents were financially well off, Garrison preferred to teach rather than depend upon them to pay for her education. Subsequently, she worked in the dairy industry, without losing sight of her ultimate ambition. During these years of farm life, Garrison's butter became one of the notable products of the village.

In 1872, Garrison entered the medical office of Dr. John Williamson, of Dixon, as a student, and two years later, Garrison matriculated at the Woman's Hospital Medical College of Chicago (later, Woman's Medical School of Northwestern University). At that time, the curriculum included only two courses of lectures so that Garrison graduated on February 29, 1876.

== Career ==
=== Physician ===
Immediately after graduating, Garrison was requested to go to Franklin Grove, Illinois, to temporarily oversee a large local practice, which she managed successfully until the return of the owner. In October 1876, she returned to Dixon and opened her own medical practice, eventually becoming one of the most prominent general practitioners in the city. Beginning when the city numbered about 2,500, she handled all the patient that came to her, driving night and day in country and town, taking the common as well as the uncommon things that were required, including major and minor surgery. From December 1890 to February 1891, Garrison visited New York City to visit hospitals and take the post graduate course at the Post Graduate School of New York, thus improving her skills and becoming familiar with later devices and newer theories.

Garrison traveled extensively throughout the United States, visiting New York, California, and Florida. In 1897, she travelled to Europe, when she accompanied the delegates to the Twelfth International Medical congress (held in Moscow) through Italy, Switzerland, Germany, and Austria. Upon her return in that year, she delivered a lecture entitled "The Women I Met in Russia" before the students of the Steinmann Institute. In June 1900, she made plans to travel to Europe to visit the 1900 Paris Exposition and witness the Oberammergau Passion Play in the Bavarian Alps. She made an announcement in 1920, that after forty-four years of medical practice, she would specialize in the medical cure of goitre, asthma and beginning tuberculosis.

Garrison was affiliated with the American Medical Association, the Illinois State Medical Society, and the North Central Illinois Society. Garrison mentored young women in the medical profession. At the 1899 annual alumni meeting of the Alumnae Association of the Woman's Medical School of the Northwestern University, Chicago, Garrison was elected vice-president of the organization.

=== Writer ===
Garrison's writings were highly valued and widely quoted in the medical journals of the day, with the periodicals of New York, Philadelphia, Boston, Richard, Virginia, and other large cities welcoming her contributions. Among her more prominent productions was a paper on "Scarlet Fever, treated with Antefebrin" (N.Y. Med. Record, October 22, 1892); "Some Clinical Reflections on the Treatment of Diphtheria" (Dietetic Gazette, February 1893); "Roseolo and Rothelin" (American Medico Surgical Bulletin, October 1894); "A Case of Exopthalmas in an Infant of Three Months", (The Journal of the American Medical Association, report of the proceedings of Paediatrics in the forty-fifth annual meeting); "Establishing a Practice" (The Woman Physician); and "Evolution of Girls" at the forty-seventh annual meeting of the American Medical Association, held at Atlanta, Georgia, the paper being published in the journal proceedings and meeting with general favor.

In 1899, Garrison received a personal request from Dr. Henry Tuley of Louisville, Kentucky, chairman of the Section of Diseases of Children, to read a paper at the meeting of the American Medical Association at Columbus, Ohio, as a delegate from the State Medical Society, upon her personal experience with the epidemic disease which had recently so closely simulated measles and scarlet fever, the title of the paper being "LaGrippe Exanthemata".

== Personal life ==
Garrison was a member of the Woman's Christian Temperance Union, dating her connection with this organization from 1876. In religion, she was a member of the Methodist Episcopal Church, as were her parents before her.

Harriet Garrison died October 3, 1930, and was buried in the Girton Cemetery, Lee County, Illinois.
