= Twelvemile Corner, Illinois =

- Unincorporated community
- Location within Illinois Location within the United States
- Coordinates: 41°45′34″N 89°05′00″W
- Country: United States
- State: Illinois
- County: Lee
- Township: Viola
- Elevation: 784 ft (239 m)
- Time zone: UTC-6 (Central (CST))
  - Summer (DST): UTC-5 (CDT)
- Area codes: 815 & 779
- GNIS feature ID: 419969

Twelvemile Corner is an unincorporated community in Lee County, Illinois, United States. Twelvemile Corner is located at the intersection of U.S. Route 30 and Illinois Route 251, north of Compton.
