= Bradley Fritts =

American politician

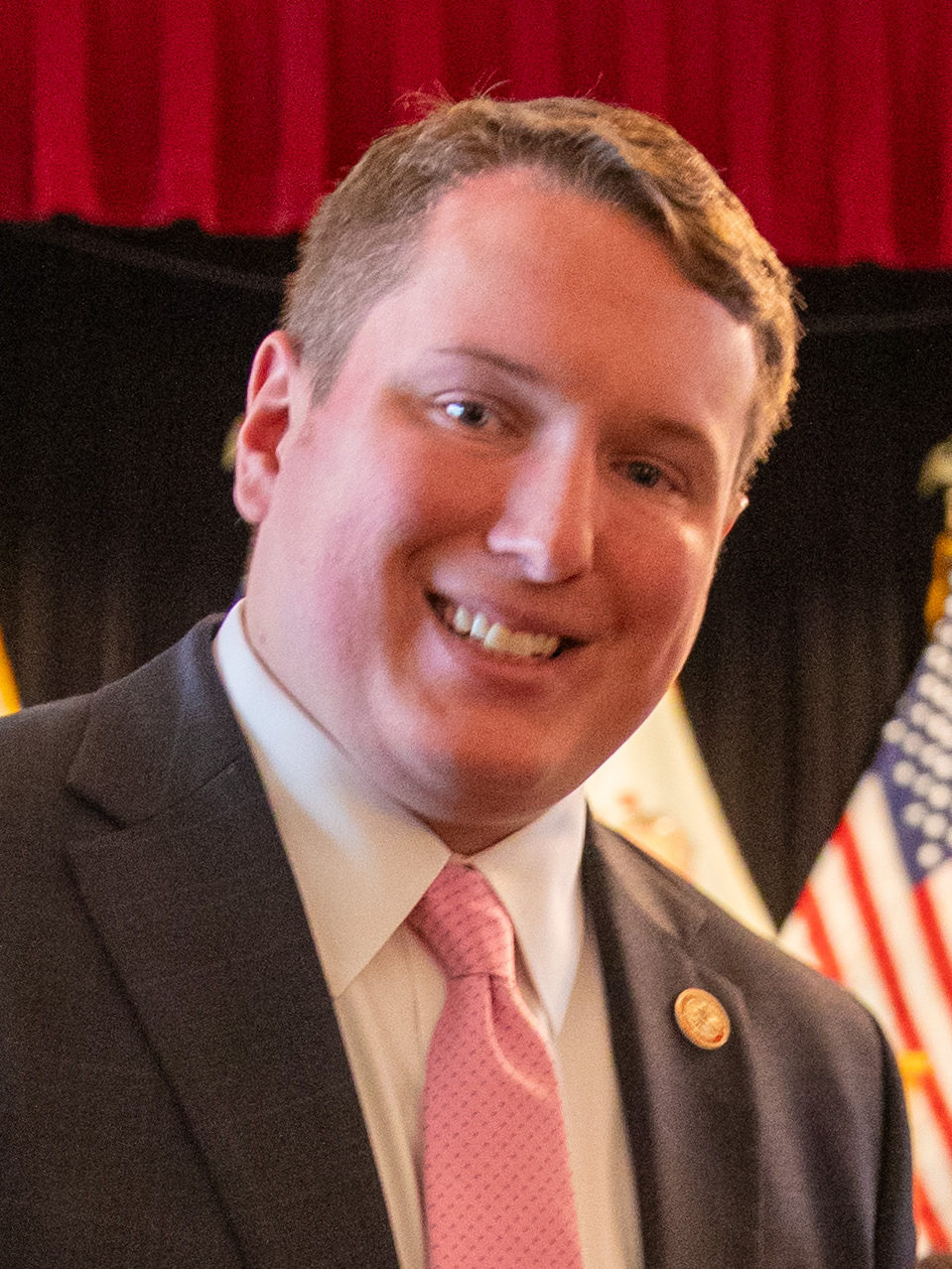
- Fritts in 2025

Member of the Illinois House of Representatives from the 74th district
- Incumbent
- Assumed office January 11, 2023
- Preceded by: Dan Swanson (redistricted)

Personal details
- Born: January 8, 2000 (age 26) Dixon, Illinois, U.S.
- Party: Republican
- Education: University of Illinois
- Profession: Farmer; Politician

Bradley J. Fritts (born January 8, 2000) is an American politician. He is a Republican member of the Illinois House of Representatives for the 74th district, encompassing all or parts of DeKalb, LaSalle, Lee, Ogle, and Whiteside counties in north-central Illinois. He is currently the youngest member of the Illinois House of Representatives and its first member born after the year 2000.

== Early life and education ==
Fritts has a Bachelor's degree in agricultural and consumer economics from the University of Illinois at Urbana-Champaign.

== Career ==
He is a farmer and substitute teacher by profession. A Republican precinct committeeman, Fritts comes from a politically active family; his father Edward Fritts is the township supervisor for Dixon Township and his late uncle John Fritts was the Lee County Treasurer.

== Electoral history ==
=== 2022 ===
In the 2022 Republican primary, Fritts defeated Liandro Arellano, the incumbent Mayor of Dixon, and ran unopposed in the general election.

2022 Republican Primary Election - Illinois House of Representatives' 74th district
Party	Candidate	Votes	%
Republican	Bradley Fritts	6,183	57.56
Republican	Liandro "Li" Arellano, Jr.	4,558	42.44
Total votes		9,840	100.0

2022 General Election - Illinois House of Representatives' 74th district
Party	Candidate	Votes	%
Republican	Bradley Fritts	29,932	100.00
Total votes		29,932	100.00
Turnout			
Republican hold			
