= May Township, Illinois =

May Township, Illinois may refer to the following:

- May Township, Christian County, Illinois
- May Township, Lee County, Illinois

== See also ==
- May Township (disambiguation)
