= Palmyra, Illinois (disambiguation) =

Palmyra, Illinois may refer to places in the U.S. state of Illinois:

- Palmyra, Illinois, a village
- Palmyra, Edwards County, Illinois, a ghost town
- Palmyra, Lee County, Illinois, an unincorporated community
