= Willow Creek Township, Lee County, Illinois =

Coordinates: 41°45′32″N 88°59′39″W

Willow Creek Township
- Township
- Location in Lee County

- Lee County's location in Illinois
- Country: United States
- State: Illinois
- County: Lee
- Established: September 1854

Government
  - Supervisor: Robert A. Book

Area
  - Total: 35.16 sq mi (91.1 km^{2})
  - Land: 35.11 sq mi (90.9 km^{2})
  - Water: 0.04 sq mi (0.10 km^{2}) 0.12%
- Elevation: 896 ft (273 m)

Population (2020)
  - Total: 646
  - Density: 18.4/sq mi (7.10/km^{2})
- Time zone: UTC-6 (CST)
  - Summer (DST): UTC-5 (CDT)
- FIPS code: 17-103-81971
- Website: willowcreektownship.org

Willow Creek Township is located in Lee County, Illinois. As of the 2020 census, its population was 646 and it contained 277 housing units. Willow Creek Township was formed from Wyoming Township in September, 1854.

== Geography ==
According to the 2021 census gazetteer files, Willow Creek Township has a total area of 35.16 square miles (91.06 km^{2}), of which 35.11 square miles (90.93 km^{2}) (or 99.88%) is land and 0.04 square miles (0.10 km^{2}) (or 0.12%) is water.

== Demographics ==
As of the 2020 census there were 646 people, 199 households, and 115 families residing in the township. The population density was 18.38 inhabitants per square mile (7.10/km^{2}). There were 277 housing units at an average density of 7.88 per square mile (3.04/km^{2}). The racial makeup of the township was 93.34% White, 0.46% African American, 0.15% Native American, 0.31% Asian, 0.00% Pacific Islander, 1.86% from other races, and 3.87% from two or more races. Hispanic or Latino of any race were 4.02% of the population.

There were 199 households, out of which 30.70% had children under the age of 18 living with them, 43.22% were married couples living together, 13.07% had a female householder with no spouse present, and 42.21% were non-families. 41.70% of all households were made up of individuals, and 22.60% had someone living alone who was 65 years of age or older. The average household size was 2.64 and the average family size was 3.66.

The township's age distribution consisted of 38.7% under the age of 18, 2.7% from 18 to 24, 19.8% from 25 to 44, 22.8% from 45 to 64, and 16.0% who were 65 years of age or older. The median age was 38.4 years. For every 100 females, there were 86.2 males. For every 100 females age 18 and over, there were 128.4 males.

The median income for a household in the township was $59,875, and the median income for a family was $66,319. Males had a median income of $60,347 versus $40,104 for females. The per capita income for the township was $33,589. About 2.6% of families and 8.4% of the population were below the poverty line, including 3.5% of those under age 18 and 6.0% of those age 65 or over.

Historical population
Census	Pop.	Note	%±
2010	688		—
2020	646		−6.1%
