= East Grove =

East Grove can refer to:

- East Grove Street District (Bloomington, Illinois)
- East Grove Township, Lee County, Illinois
