= Marion Township, Lee County, Illinois =

Coordinates: 41°43′34″N 89°25′44″W

Marion Township
- Township
- Location in Lee County

- Lee County's location in Illinois
- Country: United States
- State: Illinois
- County: Lee
- Established: September 1854

Government
  - Supervisor: S. Charles Dunphy

Area
  - Total: 35.58 sq mi (92.2 km^{2})
  - Land: 35.56 sq mi (92.1 km^{2})
  - Water: 0.02 sq mi (0.052 km^{2}) 0.05%
- Elevation: 715 ft (218 m)

Population (2020)
  - Total: 206
  - Density: 5.79/sq mi (2.24/km^{2})
- Time zone: UTC-6 (CST)
  - Summer (DST): UTC-5 (CDT)
- FIPS code: 17-103-46890

Marion Township is located in Lee County, Illinois. As of the 2020 census, its population was 206 and it contained 112 housing units.

== History ==
Marion Township was formed from Hamilton and Amboy townships in September 1854. Three years later, on March 3, 1857, the western half of the township became Harmon Township allowing Marion Township to take its present form.

== Geography ==
According to the 2021 census gazetteer files, Marion Township has a total area of 35.58 square miles (92.15 km^{2}), of which 35.56 square miles (92.10 km^{2}) (or 99.95%) is land and 0.02 square miles (0.05 km^{2}) (or 0.05%) is water.

== Demographics ==
As of the 2020 census there were 206 people, 105 households, and 49 families residing in the township. The population density was 5.79 inhabitants per square mile (2.24/km^{2}). There were 112 housing units at an average density of 3.15 per square mile (1.22/km^{2}). The racial makeup of the township was 91.75% White, 0.49% African American, 0.00% Native American, 0.49% Asian, 0.00% Pacific Islander, 1.94% from other races, and 5.34% from two or more races. Hispanic or Latino of any race were 4.37% of the population.

There were 105 households, out of which 39.00% had children under the age of 18 living with them, 45.71% were married couples living together, 0.95% had a female householder with no spouse present, and 53.33% were non-families. 41.90% of all households were made up of individuals, and 16.20% had someone living alone who was 65 years of age or older. The average household size was 2.40 and the average family size was 3.51.

The township's age distribution consisted of 22.6% under the age of 18, 5.6% from 18 to 24, 11.2% from 25 to 44, 40.6% from 45 to 64, and 20.2% who were 65 years of age or older. The median age was 46.8 years. For every 100 females, there were 71.4 males. For every 100 females age 18 and over, there were 91.2 males.

The median income for a household in the township was $59,063, and the median income for a family was $64,519. Males had a median income of $58,750 versus $13,382 for females. The per capita income for the township was $26,160. About 2.0% of families and 7.1% of the population were below the poverty line, including 0.0% of those under age 18 and 2.0% of those age 65 or over.

Historical population
| Census | Pop. | Note | %± |
|---|---|---|---|
| 2010 | 232 | | — |
| 2020 | 206 | | −11.2% |
U.S. Decennial Census
