= Palmyra, Lee County, Illinois =

Palmyra, Illinois
- Unincorporated community
- Location within Illinois Location within the United States
- Coordinates: 41°51′06″N 89°34′40″W
- Country: United States
- State: Illinois
- County: Lee
- Township: Palmyra
- Elevation: 810 ft (250 m)
- Time zone: UTC-6 (Central (CST))
  - Summer (DST): UTC-5 (CDT)
- Area codes: 815 & 779
- GNIS feature ID: 415322

Palmyra is an unincorporated community in Lee County, Illinois, United States.
