= Dinosaur Diorama =

American television production company

- Type: Production Company
- Industry: Entertainment
- Founded: Brooklyn, New York, USA (2006)
- Headquarters: Brooklyn, NY, USA
- Key people: Thom Woodley
- Products: Web Series

Dinosaur Diorama, also known as DioramaTV, is a production company that focuses primarily on the creation of serialized online video. Their major releases include the first scripted sitcom-length web series, The Burg, the Michael Eisner-produced The All-for-nots, Greg & Donny, and All's Faire. The company consists of Thom Woodley, Matt Yeager and Johnny North, and was founded by Woodley and Kathleen Grace.

It is significant because along with Stage 9 and Big Fantastic, it is one of the three major online video production companies. Their shows have been featured in Wired and The New York Times. The company itself was mentioned in conjunction with Michael Eisner's web distribution company Vuguru by Variety. They were nominated for five Streamy Awards in 2009 (Best Ensemble for All's Faire, Best Music for All's Faire, Best Music for The All-For-Nots, Best Cinematography for The All-For-Nots, and Best Ad Placement for The All-For-Nots).

In September, 2009, Dinosaur Diorama became the first new media company to sign with the Writers Guild of America on their New Media contract.

As of 2015, Dinosaur Diorama began to produce podcasts (Fail to the Chief and Will It Blow?), short films (Will Sheff's Down Down the Deep River) and other media.
