= Henry F. Gehant =

American politician (1863–1927)

Member of the Illinois House of Representatives
- In office 1907–1908

Personal details
- Born: Henry Francis Gehant; May 4, 1863 Shelby County, Illinois, U.S.
- Died: May 17, 1927 (aged 64) West Brooklyn, Illinois, U.S.
- Party: Democratic
- Occupation: Politician, farmer, businessman

Henry Francis Gehant (May 4, 1863 – May 17, 1927) was an American farmer, businessman, and politician.

Gehant was born in Shelby County, Illinois. He lived in West Brooklyn, Illinois with his wife and family and went to the West Brooklyn public schools. Gehant was a farmer and was involved in the mercantile business. He was also involved in the banking business since 1897. He served on the Lee County County Board and as president of the West Brooklyn Village Board. Gehant was a Democrat. He served in the Illinois House of Representatives in 1907 and 1908. Gehant died from a stroke at his home in West Brooklyn, Illinois.
