= LCCE =

LCCE may refer to:

- Lamaze-certified childbirth educator
- Lee County Central Electric Railway
- London Chinese Children’s Ensemble
