= Harmon Township =

Harmon Township may refer to the following townships in the United States:

- Harmon Township, Washington County, Arkansas
- Harmon Township, Lee County, Illinois
- Harmon Township, Kansas
