= Alto Township, Lee County, Illinois =

Alto Township
- Township
- Location in Lee County

- Lee County's location in Illinois
- Coordinates: 41°50′27″N 88°59′51″W
- Country: United States
- State: Illinois
- County: Lee
- Established: February 28, 1860

Government
  - Supervisor: Dennis E. Burkhart

Area
  - Total: 34.95 sq mi (90.5 km^{2})
  - Land: 34.91 sq mi (90.4 km^{2})
  - Water: 0.04 sq mi (0.10 km^{2}) 0.13%
- Elevation: 830 ft (253 m)

Population (2020)
  - Total: 510
  - Density: 15/sq mi (5.6/km^{2})
- Time zone: UTC-6 (CST)
  - Summer (DST): UTC-5 (CDT)
- ZIP codes: 60530, 60553, 61068
- FIPS code: 17-103-01101

Alto Township is one of twenty-two townships in Lee County, Illinois, USA. As of the 2020 census, its population was 510 and it contained 224 housing units.

== Geography ==
According to the 2021 census gazetteer files, Alto Township has a total area of 34.95 square miles (90.52 km^{2}), of which 34.91 square miles (90.42 km^{2}) (or 99.87%) is land and 0.04 square miles (0.10 km^{2}) (or 0.13%) is water.

=== Cities, towns, villages ===
- Steward

=== Cemeteries ===
The township contains these two cemeteries: Steward and Union.

=== Airports and landing strips ===
- Thompson Landing Strip
- Wilbur Thompson Airport

== Demographics ==
As of the 2020 census there were 510 people, 245 households, and 179 families residing in the township. The population density was 14.59 inhabitants per square mile (5.63/km^{2}). There were 224 housing units at an average density of 6.41 per square mile (2.47/km^{2}). The racial makeup of the township was 90.78% White, 1.18% African American, 0.59% Native American, 0.00% Asian, 0.00% Pacific Islander, 3.14% from other races, and 4.31% from two or more races. Hispanic or Latino of any race were 5.29% of the population.

There were 245 households, out of which 25.30% had children under the age of 18 living with them, 69.39% were married couples living together, 0.82% had a female householder with no spouse present, and 26.94% were non-families. 20.00% of all households were made up of individuals, and 10.20% had someone living alone who was 65 years of age or older. The average household size was 3.01 and the average family size was 3.48.

The township's age distribution consisted of 16.3% under the age of 18, 12.2% from 18 to 24, 25.6% from 25 to 44, 34.3% from 45 to 64, and 11.5% who were 65 years of age or older. The median age was 42.7 years. For every 100 females, there were 143.2 males. For every 100 females age 18 and over, there were 141.0 males.

The median income for a household in the township was $98,750, and the median income for a family was $110,964. Males had a median income of $44,861 versus $36,771 for females. The per capita income for the township was $32,895. About 0.6% of families and 6.2% of the population were below the poverty line, including 7.0% of those under age 18 and 5.9% of those age 65 or over.

Historical population
Census	Pop.	Note	%±
2010	565		—
2020	510		−9.7%
U.S. Decennial Census

== School districts ==
- Indian Creek Community Unit School District 425
- Steward Elementary District 220

== Political districts ==
- Illinois's 14th congressional district
- State House District 90
- State Senate District 45
