= May Township, Minnesota =

May Township is the name of two places in the U.S. state of Minnesota:

- May Township, Cass County, Minnesota
- May Township, Washington County, Minnesota

See also: May Township (disambiguation)
