= Hamilton Township, Lee County, Illinois =

Coordinates: 41°37′24″N 89°34′55″W

Hamilton Township
- Township
- Location in Lee County

- Lee County's location in Illinois
- Country: United States
- State: Illinois
- County: Lee
- Established: November 6, 1849

Government
  - Supervisor: Stacy Gonigam

Area
  - Total: 35.73 sq mi (92.5 km^{2})
  - Land: 35.73 sq mi (92.5 km^{2})
  - Water: 0 sq mi (0 km^{2}) 0%

Population (2020)
  - Total: 189
  - Density: 5.29/sq mi (2.04/km^{2})
- Time zone: UTC-6 (CST)
  - Summer (DST): UTC-5 (CDT)
- FIPS code: 17-103-32447

Hamilton Township is located in Lee County, Illinois. As of the 2020 census, its population was 189 and it contained 74 housing units. Three townships were formed from Hamilton Township. First Marion Township and May Township were formed in September, 1854, and then East Grove Township was formed on November 9, 1864.

== Geography ==
According to the 2021 census gazetteer files, Hamilton Township has a total area of 35.73 square miles (92.54 km^{2}), all land.

== Demographics ==
As of the 2020 census there were 189 people, 82 households, and 42 families residing in the township. The population density was 5.29 inhabitants per square mile (2.04/km^{2}). There were 74 housing units at an average density of 2.07 per square mile (0.80/km^{2}). The racial makeup of the township was 86.77% White, 0.00% African American, 0.00% Native American, 0.53% Asian, 0.00% Pacific Islander, 0.53% from other races, and 12.17% from two or more races. Hispanic or Latino of any race were 7.94% of the population.

There were 82 households, out of which 8.50% had children under the age of 18 living with them, 51.22% were married couples living together, 0.00% had a female householder with no spouse present, and 48.78% were non-families. 29.30% of all households were made up of individuals, and 12.20% had someone living alone who was 65 years of age or older. The average household size was 2.18 and the average family size was 2.71.

The township's age distribution consisted of 3.9% under the age of 18, 3.9% from 18 to 24, 20% from 25 to 44, 53.7% from 45 to 64, and 18.4% who were 65 years of age or older. The median age was 50.3 years. For every 100 females, there were 96.7 males. For every 100 females age 18 and over, there were 104.8 males.

Males had a median income of $39,432 versus $26,450 for females. The per capita income for the township was $41,575. About 11.9% of families and 6.1% of the population were below the poverty line, including 0.0% of those under age 18 and 33.3% of those age 65 or over.

Historical population
Census	Pop.	Note	%±
2010	205		—
2020	189		−7.8%
U.S. Decennial Census
