= Lee County Central Electric Railway =

Railway in Illinois

The Lee County Central Electric Railway, or LCC, was an electric interurban railway linking the small prairie town of Lee Center with nearby Amboy and Middlebury in northern Illinois. The line was conceived as an electric railway link between the cities of Steward, south of Rochelle, and Dixon, but was never able to raise enough capital to reach either destination. The LCC was one of the smallest and shortest-lived electric operations in the entire national interurban network, and yet despite its notorious operational problems it survived as a de-electrified freight carrier far longer than most larger interurban railways.

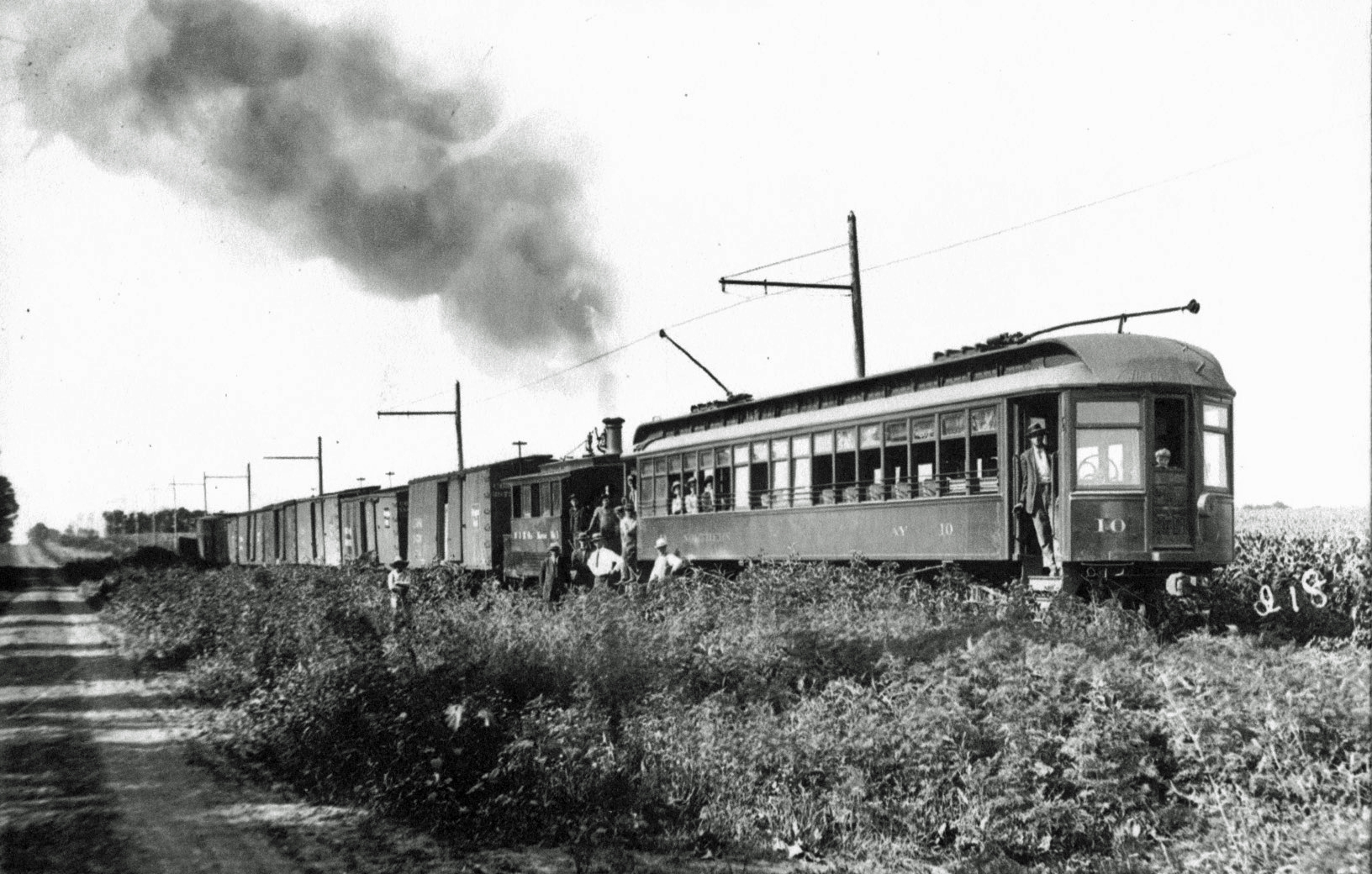

== History ==
The LCC was incorporated as the Northern Illinois Electric Railway Company in 1901 but despite some early right-of-way work it was nearly a decade before serious construction started. In 1910, enough capital was raised to construct a section of the railroad between Lee Center, which had no railroad, and the nearby town of Amboy. Railroad construction engineer George H.T. Shaw, who lived in Lee Center, promoted the line, and on December 10, 1910 service opened over the five-mile route using a secondhand streetcar obtained from Chicago. A year later a large wooden interurban car was bought from a line in Louisville, Kentucky, but the little line's power system was insufficient for normal operation and the big car had trouble making it over the railroad. Adequate electric power also prevented freight from being carried, and a succession of outdated steam locomotives were used until a gas-electric locomotive was acquired in the late 1920s.

Despite its troubles the line was extended in 1912, this time seven miles in the opposite direction from Amboy to a country crossroads called Middlebury which consisted of a grain elevator and a schoolhouse. For the next three years passenger operations were conducted using the line's two cars, mainly between Lee Center and Amboy with operation to Middlebury if there were any passengers.

In 1913 the line went into bankruptcy and was reorganized as the Lee County Central Electric Railway on 9 July 1914. In 1915 passenger service was abandoned and the wires were taken down the next year, making the LCC among the earliest interurbans to abandon passenger service. Freight service continued, though, carrying grain to an interchange in Binghampton with the Chicago, Burlington, and Quincy Railroad.

In the 1930s the line east from Lee Center to Middlebury was abandoned but in 1946 the Lee County Grain Association purchased the railroad and operated it into the 1970s, decades after most electric interurbans had completely ceased to exist.

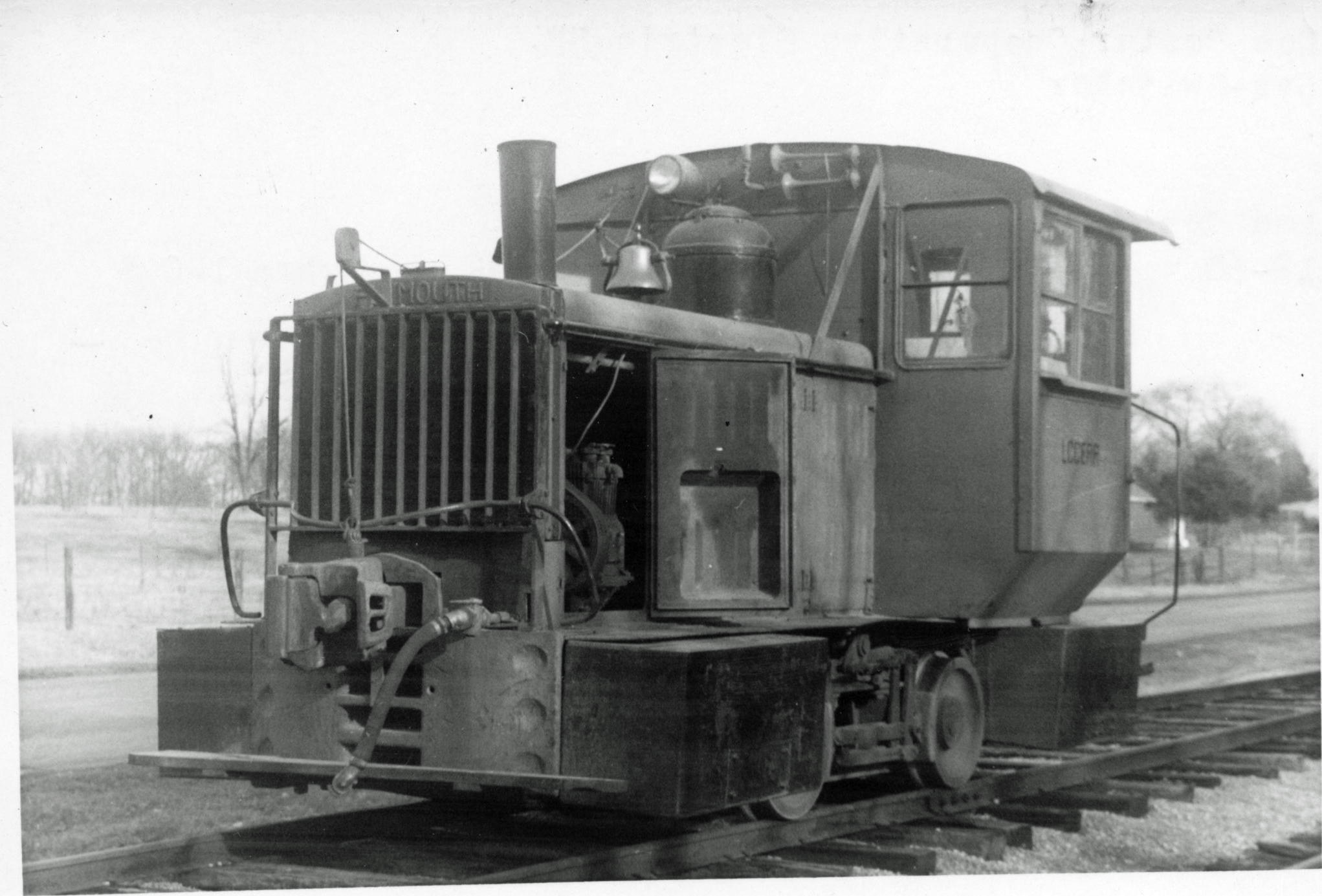

A remnant of the railroad is still visible with the fill used to cross Jeanblanc Creek on the west side of Lee Center Road along with wooden pilings and supports that were once part of a trestle spanning the creek.
