= Nachusa Township, Lee County, Illinois =

Coordinates: 41°49′41″N 89°22′26″W

Nachusa Township
- Township
- Location in Lee County

- Lee County's location in Illinois
- Country: United States
- State: Illinois
- County: Lee
- Established: February 8, 1871

Government
  - Supervisor: Richard Appelquist

Area
  - Total: 28.92 sq mi (74.9 km^{2})
  - Land: 28.91 sq mi (74.9 km^{2})
  - Water: 0.01 sq mi (0.026 km^{2}) 0.03%
- Elevation: 797 ft (243 m)

Population (2020)
  - Total: 480
  - Density: 17/sq mi (6.4/km^{2})
- Time zone: UTC-6 (CST)
  - Summer (DST): UTC-5 (CDT)
- FIPS code: 17-103-51557

Nachusa Township is located in Lee County, Illinois. As of the 2020 census, its population was 480 and it contained 199 housing units. Nachusa Township was formed from China Township on February 8, 1872. It contains the census-designated place of Nachusa.

== Geography ==
According to the 2021 census gazetteer files, Nachusa Township has a total area of 28.92 square miles (74.90 km^{2}), of which 28.91 square miles (74.88 km^{2}) (or 99.97%) is land and 0.01 square miles (0.03 km^{2}) (or 0.03%) is water.

== Demographics ==
As of the 2020 census there were 480 people, 144 households, and 115 families residing in the township. The population density was 16.60 inhabitants per square mile (6.41/km^{2}). There were 199 housing units at an average density of 6.88 per square mile (2.66/km^{2}). The racial makeup of the township was 90.21% White, 1.04% African American, 0.00% Native American, 0.21% Asian, 0.00% Pacific Islander, 2.50% from other races, and 6.04% from two or more races. Hispanic or Latino of any race were 6.46% of the population.

There were 144 households, out of which 36.80% had children under the age of 18 living with them, 56.25% were married couples living together, 12.50% had a female householder with no spouse present, and 20.14% were non-families. 20.10% of all households were made up of individuals, and 0.00% had someone living alone who was 65 years of age or older. The average household size was 2.85 and the average family size was 3.08.

The township's age distribution consisted of 29.6% under the age of 18, 6.9% from 18 to 24, 25.6% from 25 to 44, 15.5% from 45 to 64, and 22.4% who were 65 years of age or older. The median age was 40.7 years. For every 100 females, there were 111.2 males. For every 100 females age 18 and over, there were 122.6 males.

The median income for a household in the township was $72,500, and the median income for a family was $57,031. Males had a median income of $53,571 versus $46,806 for females. The per capita income for the township was $29,983. About 5.2% of families and 2.7% of the population were below the poverty line, including 0.0% of those under age 18 and 0.0% of those age 65 or over.

Historical population
Census	Pop.	Note	%±
2010	493		—
2020	480		−2.6%
U.S. Decennial Census
