= Lou Bevil =

American baseball player (1922-1973)

- Pitcher
- Born: November 27, 1922; Nelson, Illinois, U.S.
- Died: February 1, 1973 (aged 50); Dixon, Illinois, U.S.
- Batted: Both Threw: Right

MLB debut
- September 2, 1942, for the Washington Senators

Last MLB appearance
- September 13, 1942, for the Washington Senators

MLB statistics
- Win–loss record: 0–1
- Earned run average: 6.52
- Strikeouts: 2
- Stats at Baseball Reference

Teams
- Washington Senators (1942)

Louis Eugene Bevil (born Bevilacqua; November 27, 1922 – February 1, 1973) was an American professional baseball player. Bevil was a right-handed pitcher and native of Nelson, Illinois, who appeared in four games in Major League Baseball in September of 1942 as a member of the Washington Senators. He was listed as 5 feet 11 inches (1.80 m) tall and 190 pounds (86 kg), and was an alumnus of the University of Notre Dame.

Bevil's professional career began in 1940 and he was recalled to Washington after completing three minor-league seasons. At the age of 19, Bevil was the second-youngest player in the American League in 1942. In his debut, he was the starting pitcher against the Chicago White Sox on September 2 at Griffith Stadium. But he registered only one out, and permitted four runs on four hits and one base on balls before being relieved by Bill Zuber. Bevil was charged with the eventual 7–6 defeat, his only MLB pitching decision. He appeared in three more games, all in relief, before the end of the 1942 campaign. He then joined the United States Army for World War II military service.

He returned to professional baseball, but not the major leagues, in 1946. During his four-game stint with Washington in 1942, Bevil allowed nine hits and 11 bases on balls in 92/3 innings pitched, posting an earned run average of 6.52. He was credited with two strikeouts. He played in the minors through 1950, where he won 100 games. He also was a player-manager for all or parts of three minor-league seasons.

Bevil died at age 50 in Dixon, Illinois.
