= Viola Township, Lee County, Illinois =

Coordinates: 41°45′23″N 89°06′48″W

Viola Township
- Township
- Location in Lee County

- Lee County's location in Illinois
- Country: United States
- State: Illinois
- County: Lee
- Established: September 1861

Government
  - Supervisor: Robert Sabin

Area
  - Total: 35.39 sq mi (91.7 km^{2})
  - Land: 35.36 sq mi (91.6 km^{2})
  - Water: 0.03 sq mi (0.078 km^{2}) 0.08%
- Elevation: 761 ft (232 m)

Population (2020)
  - Total: 312
  - Density: 8.82/sq mi (3.41/km^{2})
- Time zone: UTC-6 (CST)
  - Summer (DST): UTC-5 (CDT)
- FIPS code: 17-103-78110

Viola Township is located in Lee County, Illinois. As of the 2020 census, its population was 312 and it contained 121 housing units. Viola Township was originally named Stockton Township and was formed from Brooklyn Township on February 12, 1861. The name was changed to Viola Township in September, 1861.

== Geography ==
According to the 2021 census gazetteer files, Viola Township has a total area of 35.39 square miles (91.66 km^{2}), of which 35.36 square miles (91.58 km^{2}) (or 99.92%) is land and 0.03 square miles (0.08 km^{2}) (or 0.08%) is water.

== Demographics ==
As of the 2020 census there were 312 people, 130 households, and 94 families residing in the township. The population density was 8.82 inhabitants per square mile (3.41/km^{2}). There were 121 housing units at an average density of 3.42 per square mile (1.32/km^{2}). The racial makeup of the township was 92.31% White, 1.28% African American, 0.64% Native American, 0.00% Asian, 0.00% Pacific Islander, 2.24% from other races, and 3.53% from two or more races. Hispanic or Latino of any race were 6.41% of the population.

There were 130 households, out of which 29.20% had children under the age of 18 living with them, 59.23% were married couples living together, 13.08% had a female householder with no spouse present, and 27.69% were non-families. 27.70% of all households were made up of individuals, and 16.90% had someone living alone who was 65 years of age or older. The average household size was 2.68 and the average family size was 3.24.

The township's age distribution consisted of 26.9% under the age of 18, 6.3% from 18 to 24, 21.3% from 25 to 44, 22.9% from 45 to 64, and 22.6% who were 65 years of age or older. The median age was 41.7 years. For every 100 females, there were 109.0 males. For every 100 females age 18 and over, there were 127.7 males.

The median income for a household in the township was $57,273, and the median income for a family was $60,714. Males had a median income of $31,875 versus $17,344 for females. The per capita income for the township was $31,824. About 8.5% of families and 9.2% of the population were below the poverty line, including 16.0% of those under age 18 and 0.0% of those age 65 or over.

Historical population
Census	Pop.	Note	%±
2010	351		—
2020	312		−11.1%
U.S. Decennial Census
