= Lee Center Township, Lee County, Illinois =

Coordinates: 41°42′30″N 89°14′00″W

Lee Center Township
- Township
- Location in Lee County

- Lee County's location in Illinois
- Country: United States
- State: Illinois
- County: Lee
- Established: November 6, 1849

Government
  - Supervisor: Gerald F. Henkel

Area
  - Total: 36.52 sq mi (94.6 km^{2})
  - Land: 36.28 sq mi (94.0 km^{2})
  - Water: 0.24 sq mi (0.62 km^{2}) 0.66%
- Elevation: 814 ft (248 m)

Population (2020)
  - Total: 568
  - Density: 15.7/sq mi (6.04/km^{2})
- Time zone: UTC-6 (CST)
  - Summer (DST): UTC-5 (CDT)
- FIPS code: 17-103-42613

Lee Center Township is located in Lee County, Illinois. As of the 2020 census, its population was 568 and it contained 258 housing units.

It contains the census-designated place of Lee Center.

== Geography ==
According to the 2021 census gazetteer files, Lee Center Township has a total area of 36.52 square miles (94.59 km^{2}), of which 36.28 square miles (93.96 km^{2}) (or 99.34%) is land and 0.24 square miles (0.62 km^{2}) (or 0.66%) is water.

== Demographics ==
As of the 2020 census there were 568 people, 327 households, and 227 families residing in the township. The population density was 15.55 inhabitants per square mile (6.00/km^{2}). There were 258 housing units at an average density of 7.06 per square mile (2.73/km^{2}). The racial makeup of the township was 94.19% White, 0.70% African American, 0.70% Native American, 0.00% Asian, 0.35% Pacific Islander, 0.88% from other races, and 3.17% from two or more races. Hispanic or Latino of any race were 3.87% of the population.

There were 327 households, out of which 10.70% had children under the age of 18 living with them, 64.53% were married couples living together, 4.89% had a female householder with no spouse present, and 30.58% were non-families. 21.70% of all households were made up of individuals, and 13.50% had someone living alone who was 65 years of age or older. The average household size was 2.00 and the average family size was 2.30.

The township's age distribution consisted of 7.4% under the age of 18, 4.7% from 18 to 24, 14.7% from 25 to 44, 38.1% from 45 to 64, and 35.1% who were 65 years of age or older. The median age was 59.8 years. For every 100 females, there were 98.5 males. For every 100 females age 18 and over, there were 102.3 males.

The median income for a household in the township was $62,723, and the median income for a family was $57,257. Males had a median income of $71,042 versus $29,219 for females. The per capita income for the township was $39,235. About 0.0% of families and 3.1% of the population were below the poverty line, including 20.8% of those under age 18 and 0.0% of those age 65 or over.

Historical population
Census	Pop.	Note	%±
2010	593		—
2020	568		−4.2%
U.S. Decennial Census
