= Franklin Grove Township, Lee County, Illinois =

Franklin Grove Township
- Township
- Location in Lee County

- Lee County's location in Illinois
- Coordinates: 41°49′26″N 89°18′45″W
- Country: United States
- State: Illinois
- County: Lee
- Established: May 14, 1850

Area
  - Total: 26.81 sq mi (69.4 km^{2})
  - Land: 26.80 sq mi (69.4 km^{2})
  - Water: 0.01 sq mi (0.026 km^{2}) 0.04%
- Elevation: 771 ft (235 m)

Population (2020)
  - Total: 1,203
  - Density: 44.89/sq mi (17.33/km^{2})
- Time zone: UTC-6 (CST)
  - Summer (DST): UTC-5 (CDT)
- ZIP codes: 61031, 61310
- FIPS code: 17-103-27695

Franklin Grove Township (formerly China Township) is one of twenty-two townships in Lee County, Illinois, USA. As of the 2020 census, its population was 1,203. Its name was changed from China Township in 1994.

== Geography ==
According to the 2021 census gazetteer files, Franklin Grove Township has a total area of 26.81 square miles (69.44 km^{2}), of which 26.80 square miles (69.41 km^{2}) (or 99.96%) is land and 0.01 square miles (0.03 km^{2}) (or 0.04%) is water.

=== Cities, towns, villages ===
- Franklin Grove

=== Cemeteries ===
The township contains these two cemeteries: Franklin Grove and Temperance Hill.

== Demographics ==
As of the 2020 census there were 1,203 people, 559 households, and 320 families residing in the township. The population density was 44.87 inhabitants per square mile (17.32/km^{2}). There were 553 housing units at an average density of 20.63 per square mile (7.97/km^{2}). The racial makeup of the township was 92.02% White, 0.33% African American, 0.08% Native American, 0.58% Asian, 0.17% Pacific Islander, 2.16% from other races, and 4.66% from two or more races. Hispanic or Latino of any race were 4.24% of the population.

There were 559 households, out of which 20.40% had children under the age of 18 living with them, 37.57% were married couples living together, 18.07% had a female householder with no spouse present, and 42.75% were non-families. 37.60% of all households were made up of individuals, and 25.00% had someone living alone who was 65 years of age or older. The average household size was 2.24 and the average family size was 3.06.

The township's age distribution consisted of 16.4% under the age of 18, 9.9% from 18 to 24, 22.7% from 25 to 44, 22.3% from 45 to 64, and 28.9% who were 65 years of age or older. The median age was 46.2 years. For every 100 females, there were 87.7 males. For every 100 females age 18 and over, there were 87.0 males.

The median income for a household in the township was $44,063, and the median income for a family was $59,286. Males had a median income of $46,367 versus $21,827 for females. The per capita income for the township was $29,554. About 6.3% of families and 7.4% of the population were below the poverty line, including 13.5% of those under age 18 and 8.3% of those age 65 or over.

Historical population
Census	Pop.	Note	%±
2000	1,472		—
2010	1,416		−3.8%
2020	1,203		−15.0%
U.S. Decennial Census

== School districts ==
- Amboy Community Unit School District 272
- Ashton Community Unit School District 275

== Political districts ==
- Illinois's 14th congressional district
- State House District 90
- State Senate District 45
