= Dixon Downtown Historic District =

- U.S. National Register of Historic Places
- U.S. Historic district
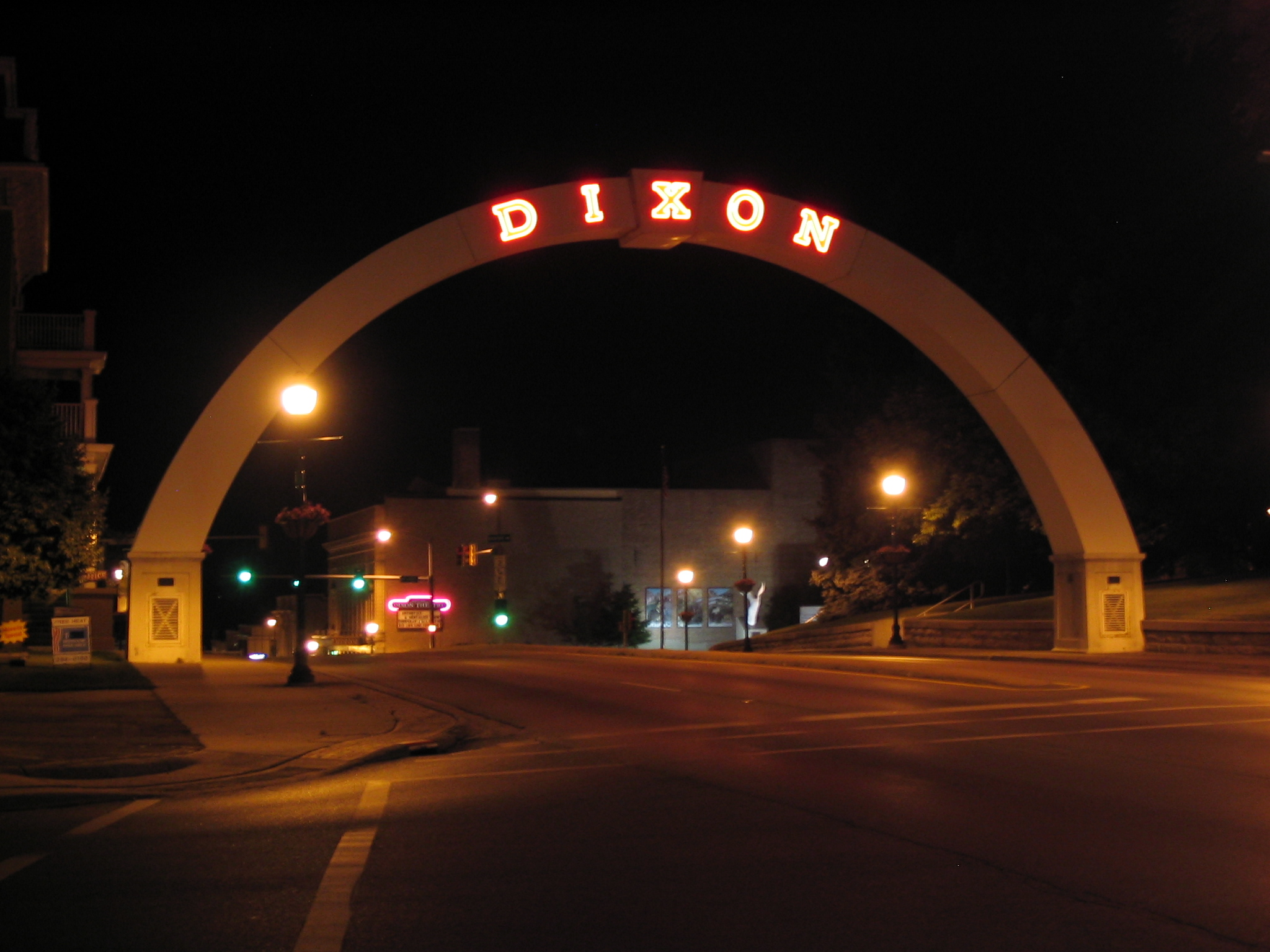
- Dixon Arch

- Location within Illinois Location within the United States
- Location: Roughly bounded by River St., Dixon Ave., 3rd St., & Monroe Ave., Dixon, Illinois
- Coordinates: 41°50′34″N 89°29′02″W
- NRHP reference No.: 12000059
- Added to NRHP: March 7, 2012

The Dixon Downtown Historic District is a historic district which encompasses 154 properties in downtown Dixon, Illinois. The district includes the city's commercial core, which includes buildings dating back to the 1850s. Dixon's commercial buildings are largely two-story brick structures and reflect the popular architectural styles of their era of construction; the Italianate style is most common in 19th-century buildings, while the Commercial style and revival styles such as Neoclassical and Beaux-Arts became popular after 1900. Many of Dixon's prominent government and community buildings also lie within the district, including the Lee County Courthouse, City Hall, its current and former post offices, and several churches. A residential section on the west side of the district includes Queen Anne and Craftsman style homes; the former style was popular in the late 19th century, while the latter was popular in the early 20th.

The district was added to the National Register of Historic Places on March 7, 2012.
