= The Burg, Illinois =

- Unincorporated community
- Location within Illinois Location within the United States
- Coordinates: 41°42′23″N 89°05′55″W
- Country: United States
- State: Illinois
- County: Lee
- Township: Brooklyn
- Elevation: 912 ft (278 m)
- Time zone: UTC-6 (Central (CST))
  - Summer (DST): UTC-5 (CDT)
- Area codes: 815 & 779
- GNIS feature ID: 419627

The Burg is an unincorporated community in Lee County, Illinois, United States, located 1.5 miles (2.4 km) northwest of Compton.
