= Binghampton, Illinois =

- Unincorporated community
- Location within Illinois Location within the United States
- Coordinates: 41°43′00″N 89°18′14″W
- Country: United States
- State: Illinois
- County: Lee
- Township: Amboy
- Elevation: 751 ft (229 m)
- Time zone: UTC-6 (Central (CST))
  - Summer (DST): UTC-5 (CDT)
- Area codes: 815 & 779
- GNIS feature ID: 404452

Binghampton is an unincorporated community in Lee County, Illinois, United States.
