= Lee County Courthouse (Illinois) =

The Old Lee County Courthouse, located at 112 E. Second St. in the county seat of Dixon, is the former courthouse of Lee County, Illinois. The Old Courthouse is the location of Lee County executive operations. The County Board meets in the Old Courthouse, and elected county officials such as the County Clerk and the County Recorder have their offices in the building. The county’s judicial functions have moved to a nearby location, the Lee County Services Building, at 309 South Galena Ave. Its court sessions hear cases in the 15th circuit of Illinois judicial district 4.

The Old Courthouse is a contributing property to the Dixon Downtown Historic District.

== History ==
The two principal Lee County governmental buildings in use today were built in 1899-1901 (Old Courthouse) and 1982-1983 (County Services Building). The century-old Classical Revival Old Courthouse structure, when built, housed the administrative, office, and judicial functions of the county. It is a domed structure with cut stone facing and free-standing Ionic columns. The cost of initial construction was $103,395 in the gold-coin money of the day. After the court functions of the 15th Circuit left the Old Courthouse, the former courtroom was repurposed as the meeting room of the County Board.

The post-World War II growth of governmental functions, particularly those connected with legal transactions and criminal processing, led to the initial construction of the Lee County Courts Building in the 1980s. A reinforced concrete structure faced with brown brick, the building was then expanded in 2004-2005. The modern Lee County Services Building complex now houses the judicial, public health, and day-to-day administrative functions of the county.

Prior to the construction of the Old Courthouse in 1899-1901, Lee County used a now-vanished brick structure that had been built on the same site in 1840-1841. A historical marker on the Old Courthouse lawn marks the site of an Abraham Lincoln campaign speech in 1856.
