= Bradford Township, Lee County, Illinois =

Bradford Township
- Township
- Location in Lee County

- Lee County's location in Illinois
- Coordinates: 41°47′39″N 89°13′10″W
- Country: United States
- State: Illinois
- County: Lee
- Established: November 6, 1849

Government
  - Supervisor: Cynthia S. Knight

Area
  - Total: 36.01 sq mi (93.3 km^{2})
  - Land: 35.98 sq mi (93.2 km^{2})
  - Water: 0.03 sq mi (0.078 km^{2}) 0.09%
- Elevation: 797 ft (243 m)

Population (2020)
  - Total: 287
  - Density: 7.98/sq mi (3.08/km^{2})
- Time zone: UTC-6 (CST)
  - Summer (DST): UTC-5 (CDT)
- ZIP codes: 61006, 61031, 61310, 61378
- FIPS code: 17-103-07679

Bradford Township is one of twenty-two townships in Lee County, Illinois, USA. As of the 2020 census, its population was 287 and it contained 120 housing units. Ashton Township (originally called Ogle Township) was formed from part of Bradford Township on February 12, 1861.

== Geography ==
According to the 2021 census gazetteer files, Bradford Township has a total area of 36.01 square miles (93.27 km^{2}), of which 35.98 square miles (93.19 km^{2}) (or 99.91%) is land and 0.03 square miles (0.08 km^{2}) (or 0.09%) is water.

=== Cemeteries ===
The township contains these two cemeteries: Bradford and Gehant Farm.

=== Airports and landing strips ===
- Gittleson Farms Airport

== Demographics ==
As of the 2020 census there were 287 people, 90 households, and 64 families residing in the township. The population density was 7.97 inhabitants per square mile (3.08/km^{2}). There were 120 housing units at an average density of 3.33 per square mile (1.29/km^{2}). The racial makeup of the township was 88.85% White, 0.35% African American, 0.00% Native American, 0.70% Asian, 0.00% Pacific Islander, 1.74% from other races, and 8.36% from two or more races. Hispanic or Latino of any race were 5.23% of the population.

There were 90 households, out of which 48.90% had children under the age of 18 living with them, 41.11% were married couples living together, 18.89% had a female householder with no spouse present, and 28.89% were non-families. 28.90% of all households were made up of individuals, and 28.90% had someone living alone who was 65 years of age or older. The average household size was 2.84 and the average family size was 3.30.

The township's age distribution consisted of 26.2% under the age of 18, 5.1% from 18 to 24, 20.7% from 25 to 44, 32% from 45 to 64, and 16.0% who were 65 years of age or older. The median age was 42.7 years. For every 100 females, there were 137.0 males. For every 100 females age 18 and over, there were 114.8 males.

The median income for a family in the township was $86,786. Males had a median income of $42,125 versus $13,750 for females. The per capita income for the township was $20,070. About 0.0% of families and 7.4% of the population were below the poverty line, including 0.0% of those under age 18 and 0.0% of those age 65 or over.

Historical population
| Census | Pop. | Note | %± |
|---|---|---|---|
| 2010 | 324 | | — |
| 2020 | 287 | | −11.4% |
U.S. Decennial Census

== School districts ==
- Ashton Community Unit School District 275

== Political districts ==
- Illinois's 14th congressional district
- State House District 90
- State Senate District 45
