= Lee Center, Illinois =

- Unincorporated community
- Location within Illinois Location within the United States
- Coordinates: 41°44′51″N 89°16′43″W
- Country: United States
- State: Illinois
- County: Lee
- Township: Lee Center

Area
  - Total: 0.97 sq mi (2.50 km^{2})
  - Land: 0.97 sq mi (2.50 km^{2})
  - Water: 0 sq mi (0.00 km^{2})
- Elevation: 810 ft (250 m)

Population (2020)
  - Total: 146
  - Density: 151.5/sq mi (58.51/km^{2})
- Time zone: UTC-6 (Central (CST))
  - Summer (DST): UTC-5 (CDT)
- ZIP code: 61331
- Area codes: 815 & 779
- GNIS feature ID: 2806519

Lee Center is an unincorporated community in Lee County, Illinois, United States, located 13 miles (21 km) southeast of Dixon. As of the 2020 census, Lee Center had a population of 146. Lee Center first appeared as a census designated place in the 2020 U.S. census.

== Geography ==
According to the 2021 census gazetteer files, Lee Center has a total area of 0.96 square miles (2.49 km^{2}), all land.

Lee Center has a post office with ZIP code 61331. It used to have its own little railroad, the Lee County Central Electric Railway.

== Demographics ==
Historical population
Census	Pop.	Note	%±
2020	146		—
U.S. Decennial Census

As of the 2020 census there were 146 people, 52 households, and 42 families residing in the CDP. The population density was 151.61 inhabitants per square mile (58.54/km^{2}). There were 77 housing units at an average density of 79.96 per square mile (30.87/km^{2}). The racial makeup of the CDP was 93.84% White, 0.00% African American, 2.74% Native American, 0.00% Asian, 0.68% Pacific Islander, 0.68% from other races, and 2.05% from two or more races. Hispanic or Latino of any race were 3.42% of the population.

There were 52 households, out of which 17.3% had children under the age of 18 living with them, 80.77% were married couples living together, 0.00% had a female householder with no husband present, and 19.23% were non-families. 19.23% of all households were made up of individuals, and none had someone living alone who was 65 years of age or older. The average household size was 3.00 and the average family size was 2.62.

The CDP's age distribution consisted of 13.2% under the age of 18, 15.4% from 25 to 44, and 71.3% from 45 to 64. The median age was 54.2 years. For every 100 females, there were 172.0 males. For every 100 females age 18 and over, there were 136.0 males.

The median income for a family was $157,900. The per capita income for the CDP was $44,363. None of the population was below the poverty line.

== Education ==
It is in the Ashton Community Unit School District 275.
