= Reynolds Township, Lee County, Illinois =

Coordinates: 41°51′N 89°6′W

Reynolds Township
- Township
- Location in Lee County

- Lee County's location in Illinois
- Country: United States
- State: Illinois
- County: Lee
- Established: September 1858

Government
  - Supervisor: Verle W. Burhenn

Area
  - Total: 35.49 sq mi (91.9 km^{2})
  - Land: 35.45 sq mi (91.8 km^{2})
  - Water: 0.05 sq mi (0.13 km^{2}) 0.14%
- Elevation: 774 ft (236 m)

Population (2020)
  - Total: 248
  - Density: 7.00/sq mi (2.70/km^{2})
- Time zone: UTC-6 (CST)
  - Summer (DST): UTC-5 (CDT)
- FIPS code: 17-103-63407

Reynolds Township is located in Lee County, Illinois. As of the 2020 census, its population was 248 and it contained 124 housing units. Reynolds Township formed from Brooklyn Township in September, 1858.

== Geography ==
According to the 2021 census gazetteer files, Reynolds Township has a total area of 35.49 square miles (91.92 km^{2}), of which 35.44 square miles (91.79 km^{2}) (or 99.86%) is land and 0.05 square miles (0.13 km^{2}) (or 0.14%) is water.

== Demographics ==
As of the 2020 census there were 248 people, 97 households, and 80 families residing in the township. The population density was 6.99 inhabitants per square mile (2.70/km^{2}). There were 124 housing units at an average density of 3.49 per square mile (1.35/km^{2}). The racial makeup of the township was 87.90% White, 0.81% African American, 0.40% Native American, 0.00% Asian, 0.00% Pacific Islander, 1.61% from other races, and 9.27% from two or more races. Hispanic or Latino of any race were 4.84% of the population.

There were 97 households, out of which 33.00% had children under the age of 18 living with them, 80.41% were married couples living together, 2.06% had a female householder with no spouse present, and 17.53% were non-families. 17.50% of all households were made up of individuals, and 10.30% had someone living alone who was 65 years of age or older. The average household size was 2.63 and the average family size was 2.94.

The township's age distribution consisted of 24.7% under the age of 18, 3.9% from 18 to 24, 22.9% from 25 to 44, 18.8% from 45 to 64, and 29.8% who were 65 years of age or older. The median age was 40.8 years. For every 100 females, there were 84.8 males. For every 100 females age 18 and over, there were 123.3 males.

The median income for a household in the township was $87,303, and the median income for a family was $90,000. Males had a median income of $48,676 versus $30,417 for females. The per capita income for the township was $40,681. About 2.5% of families and 3.9% of the population were below the poverty line, including 12.7% of those under age 18 and 0.0% of those age 65 or over.

Historical population
Census	Pop.	Note	%±
2010	297		—
2020	248		−16.5%
U.S. Decennial Census
