= Nelson Township, Lee County, Illinois =

Coordinates: 41°47′59″N 89°34′28″W

Nelson Township
- Township
- Location in Lee County

- Lee County's location in Illinois
- Country: United States
- State: Illinois
- County: Lee
- Established: February 28, 1860

Government
  - Supervisor: Marlin Jensen

Area
  - Total: 23.65 sq mi (61.3 km^{2})
  - Land: 22.50 sq mi (58.3 km^{2})
  - Water: 1.15 sq mi (3.0 km^{2}) 4.86%

Population (2020)
  - Total: 775
  - Density: 34.4/sq mi (13.3/km^{2})
- Time zone: UTC-6 (CST)
  - Summer (DST): UTC-5 (CDT)
- FIPS code: 17-103-51960

Nelson Township is located in Lee County, Illinois. As of the 2020 census, its population was 775 and it contained 396 housing units. Nelson Township was formed from Dixon Township on February 28, 1860.

== Geography ==
According to the 2021 census gazetteer files, Nelson Township has a total area of 23.65 square miles (61.25 km^{2}), of which 22.50 square miles (58.27 km^{2}) (or 95.14%) is land and 1.15 square miles (2.98 km^{2}) (or 4.86%) is water.

== Demographics ==
As of the 2020 census there were 775 people, 285 households, and 190 families residing in the township. The population density was 32.77 inhabitants per square mile (12.65/km^{2}). There were 396 housing units at an average density of 16.74 per square mile (6.46/km^{2}). The racial makeup of the township was 88.90% White, 0.26% African American, 0.65% Native American, 0.13% Asian, 0.00% Pacific Islander, 3.10% from other races, and 6.97% from two or more races. Hispanic or Latino of any race were 7.74% of the population.

There were 285 households, out of which 22.80% had children under the age of 18 living with them, 42.11% were married couples living together, 19.30% had a female householder with no spouse present, and 33.33% were non-families. 29.80% of all households were made up of individuals, and 6.70% had someone living alone who was 65 years of age or older. The average household size was 1.96 and the average family size was 2.33.

The township's age distribution consisted of 16.1% under the age of 18, 6.3% from 18 to 24, 21.2% from 25 to 44, 40.1% from 45 to 64, and 16.3% who were 65 years of age or older. The median age was 49.6 years. For every 100 females, there were 90.4 males. For every 100 females age 18 and over, there were 82.8 males.

The median income for a household in the township was $74,526, and the median income for a family was $97,794. Males had a median income of $61,250 versus $27,750 for females. The per capita income for the township was $38,198. About 2.6% of families and 6.1% of the population were below the poverty line, including 15.6% of those under age 18 and 0.0% of those age 65 or over.

Historical population
Census	Pop.	Note	%±
2010	874		—
2020	775		−11.3%
U.S. Decennial Census
