= Brooklyn Township, Lee County, Illinois =

Brooklyn Township
- Township
- Location in Lee County

- Lee County's location in Illinois
- Coordinates: 41°40′20″N 89°06′31″W
- Country: United States
- State: Illinois
- County: Lee
- Established: November 6, 1849

Government
  - Supervisor: Geraldine K. Neal

Area
  - Total: 36.22 sq mi (93.8 km^{2})
  - Land: 36.22 sq mi (93.8 km^{2})
  - Water: 0.01 sq mi (0.026 km^{2}) 0.01%
- Elevation: 922 ft (281 m)

Population (2020)
  - Total: 691
  - Density: 19.1/sq mi (7.37/km^{2})
- Time zone: UTC-6 (CST)
  - Summer (DST): UTC-5 (CDT)
- ZIP codes: 61318, 61342, 61353, 61378
- FIPS code: 17-103-08654

Brooklyn Township is one of twenty-two townships in Lee County, Illinois, USA. As of the 2020 census, its population was 691 and it contained 336 housing units. In September 1858, Reynolds Township was formed from part of Brooklyn Township.

== Geography ==
According to the 2021 census gazetteer files, Brooklyn Township has a total area of 36.22 square miles (93.81 km^{2}), of which 36.22 square miles (93.81 km^{2}) (or 99.99%) is land and 0.01 square miles (0.03 km^{2}) (or 0.01%) is water.

=== Cities, towns, villages ===
- Compton
- West Brooklyn

=== Unincorporated towns ===
- The Burg at 41.70642°N 89.098702°W

(This list is based on USGS data and may include former settlements.)

=== Extinct towns ===
- Melugin Grove at 41.706976°N 89.112591°W

(This town is listed as "historical" by the USGS.)

=== Cemeteries ===
The township contains these four cemeteries: Brooklyn, Brooklyn Lutheran, Saint Mary's and Union.

=== Airports and landing strips ===
- Earl Barnickel Airport
- Gehant Airport
- W Davis Airport

== Demographics ==
As of the 2020 census there were 691 people, 252 households, and 165 families residing in the township. The population density was 19.08 inhabitants per square mile (7.37/km^{2}). There were 336 housing units at an average density of 9.28 per square mile (3.58/km^{2}). The racial makeup of the township was 91.32% White, 0.58% African American, 0.00% Native American, 0.43% Asian, 0.00% Pacific Islander, 2.60% from other races, and 5.07% from two or more races. Hispanic or Latino of any race were 8.68% of the population.

There were 252 households, out of which 23.80% had children under the age of 18 living with them, 52.78% were married couples living together, 4.76% had a female householder with no spouse present, and 34.52% were non-families. 30.60% of all households were made up of individuals, and 12.30% had someone living alone who was 65 years of age or older. The average household size was 2.56 and the average family size was 3.10.

The township's age distribution consisted of 27.5% under the age of 18, 4.8% from 18 to 24, 24.4% from 25 to 44, 23% from 45 to 64, and 20.3% who were 65 years of age or older. The median age was 38.2 years. For every 100 females, there were 98.8 males. For every 100 females age 18 and over, there were 105.7 males.

The median income for a household in the township was $59,167, and the median income for a family was $58,750. Males had a median income of $47,361 versus $21,000 for females. The per capita income for the township was $27,612. About 10.9% of families and 16.8% of the population were below the poverty line, including 13.2% of those under age 18 and 7.6% of those age 65 or over.

Historical population
Census	Pop.	Note	%±
2010	793		—
2020	691		−12.9%
U.S. Decennial Census

== School districts ==
- Lee Center Community Unit School District 271

== Political districts ==
- Illinois's 14th congressional district
- State House District 90
- State Senate District 45
