= Ashton Township, Lee County, Illinois =

Ashton Township
- Township
- Location in Lee County

- Lee County's location in Illinois
- Coordinates: 41°52′05″N 89°13′30″W
- Country: United States
- State: Illinois
- County: Lee
- Established: November 7, 1867

Government
  - Supervisor: Joe Gleissner

Area
  - Total: 17.87 sq mi (46.3 km^{2})
  - Land: 17.85 sq mi (46.2 km^{2})
  - Water: 0.03 sq mi (0.078 km^{2}) 0.14%
- Elevation: 830 ft (253 m)

Population (2020)
  - Total: 1,160
  - Density: 65.0/sq mi (25.1/km^{2})
- Time zone: UTC-6 (CST)
  - Summer (DST): UTC-5 (CDT)
- ZIP codes: 61006, 61031
- FIPS code: 17-103-02596

Ashton Township is one of twenty-two townships in Lee County, Illinois, USA. As of the 2020 census, its population was 1,160 and it contained 517 housing units. Ashton Township was originally formed as Ogle Township from Bradford Township on February 12, 1861; the name was changed to Ashton on November 7, 1867.

== Geography ==
According to the 2021 census gazetteer files, Ashton Township has a total area of 17.87 square miles (46.28 km^{2}), of which 17.85 square miles (46.23 km^{2}) (or 99.86%) is land and 0.03 square miles (0.08 km^{2}) (or 0.14%) is water.

=== Cities, towns, villages ===
- Ashton

=== Cemeteries ===
The township contains Ashton Cemetery.

=== Airports and landing strips ===
- Swords Heliport

== Demographics ==
As of the 2020 census there were 1,160 people, 435 households, and 260 families residing in the township. The population density was 64.91 inhabitants per square mile (25.06/km^{2}). There were 517 housing units at an average density of 28.93 per square mile (11.17/km^{2}). The racial makeup of the township was 90.17% White, 1.12% African American, 0.00% Native American, 0.43% Asian, 0.00% Pacific Islander, 1.12% from other races, and 7.16% from two or more races. Hispanic or Latino of any race were 3.88% of the population.

There were 435 households, out of which 27.40% had children under the age of 18 living with them, 47.82% were married couples living together, 5.29% had a female householder with no spouse present, and 40.23% were non-families. 34.30% of all households were made up of individuals, and 9.40% had someone living alone who was 65 years of age or older. The average household size was 2.29 and the average family size was 2.98.

The township's age distribution consisted of 21.2% under the age of 18, 6.7% from 18 to 24, 25% from 25 to 44, 34.7% from 45 to 64, and 12.3% who were 65 years of age or older. The median age was 41.9 years. For every 100 females, there were 95.8 males. For every 100 females age 18 and over, there were 120.1 males.

The median income for a household in the township was $50,958, and the median income for a family was $63,333. Males had a median income of $40,250 versus $22,907 for females. The per capita income for the township was $24,834. About 18.8% of families and 25.8% of the population were below the poverty line, including 48.6% of those under age 18 and 7.2% of those age 65 or over.

Historical population
| Census | Pop. | Note | %± |
|---|---|---|---|
| 2010 | 1,185 | | — |
| 2020 | 1,160 | | −2.1% |
U.S. Decennial Census

== School districts ==
- Ashton Community Unit School District 275

== Political districts ==
- Illinois's 14th congressional district
- State House District 90
- State Senate District 45
