= South Dixon Township, Lee County, Illinois =

Coordinates: 41°47′42″N 89°27′51″W

South Dixon Township
- Township
- Location in Lee County

- Lee County's location in Illinois
- Country: United States
- State: Illinois
- County: Lee
- Established: February 12, 1867

Government
  - Supervisor: Edward Fritts

Area
  - Total: 29.69 sq mi (76.9 km^{2})
  - Land: 29.66 sq mi (76.8 km^{2})
  - Water: 0.03 sq mi (0.078 km^{2}) 0.08%
- Elevation: 748 ft (228 m)

Population (2020)
  - Total: 982
  - Density: 33.1/sq mi (12.8/km^{2})
- Time zone: UTC-6 (CST)
  - Summer (DST): UTC-5 (CDT)
- FIPS code: 17-103-70694

South Dixon Township is located in Lee County, Illinois. As of the 2020 census, its population was 982 and it contained 441 housing units. South Dixon was formed from Dixon Township on February 12, 1867.

== Geography ==
According to the 2021 census gazetteer files, South Dixon Township has a total area of 29.69 square miles (76.90 km^{2}), of which 29.66 square miles (76.82 km^{2}) (or 99.92%) is land and 0.03 square miles (0.08 km^{2}) (or 0.08%) is water.

== Demographics ==
As of the 2020 census there were 982 people, 447 households, and 232 families residing in the township. The population density was 33.08 inhabitants per square mile (12.77/km^{2}). There were 441 housing units at an average density of 14.86 per square mile (5.74/km^{2}). The racial makeup of the township was 92.16% White, 1.63% African American, 0.41% Native American, 1.12% Asian, 0.00% Pacific Islander, 0.71% from other races, and 3.97% from two or more races. Hispanic or Latino of any race were 4.89% of the population.

There were 447 households, out of which 19.70% had children under the age of 18 living with them, 51.68% were married couples living together, 0.22% had a female householder with no spouse present, and 48.10% were non-families. 36.90% of all households were made up of individuals, and 9.80% had someone living alone who was 65 years of age or older. The average household size was 2.25 and the average family size was 2.98.

The township's age distribution consisted of 12.9% under the age of 18, 8.5% from 18 to 24, 21.9% from 25 to 44, 38.5% from 45 to 64, and 18.3% who were 65 years of age or older. The median age was 48.0 years. For every 100 females, there were 134.4 males. For every 100 females age 18 and over, there were 126.5 males.

The median income for a household in the township was $78,295, and the median income for a family was $85,278. Males had a median income of $52,083 versus $30,676 for females. The per capita income for the township was $35,797. About 6.5% of families and 12.1% of the population were below the poverty line, including 23.7% of those under age 18 and 5.4% of those age 65 or over.

Historical population
Census	Pop.	Note	%±
2010	918		—
2020	982		7.0%
U.S. Decennial Census
