= Palmyra Township, Lee County, Illinois =

Coordinates: 41°51′01″N 89°34′30″W

Palmyra Township
- Township
- Location in Lee County

- Lee County's location in Illinois
- Country: United States
- State: Illinois
- County: Lee
- Established: November 6, 1849

Government
  - Supervisor: Debra Dillow

Area
  - Total: 35.54 sq mi (92.0 km^{2})
  - Land: 34.83 sq mi (90.2 km^{2})
  - Water: 0.71 sq mi (1.8 km^{2}) 1.99%

Population (2020)
  - Total: 2,891
  - Density: 83.00/sq mi (32.05/km^{2})
- Time zone: UTC-6 (CST)
  - Summer (DST): UTC-5 (CDT)
- FIPS code: 17-103-57316

Palmyra Township is located in Lee County, Illinois. As of the 2020 census, its population was 2,891 and it contained 1,289 housing units.

== Geography ==
According to the 2021 census gazetteer files, Palmyra Township has a total area of 35.54 square miles (92.05 km^{2}), of which 34.83 square miles (90.21 km^{2}) (or 98.01%) is land and 0.71 square miles (1.84 km^{2}) (or 1.99%) is water.

== Demographics ==
As of the 2020 census there were 2,891 people, 1,243 households, and 861 families residing in the township. The population density was 81.35 inhabitants per square mile (31.41/km^{2}). There were 1,289 housing units at an average density of 36.27 per square mile (14.00/km^{2}). The racial makeup of the township was 88.34% White, 1.21% African American, 0.42% Native American, 1.63% Asian, 0.00% Pacific Islander, 1.97% from other races, and 6.43% from two or more races. Hispanic or Latino of any race were 6.09% of the population.

There were 1,243 households, out of which 22.00% had children under the age of 18 living with them, 49.56% were married couples living together, 17.14% had a female householder with no spouse present, and 30.73% were non-families. 23.00% of all households were made up of individuals, and 6.80% had someone living alone who was 65 years of age or older. The average household size was 2.14 and the average family size was 2.45.

The township's age distribution consisted of 20.1% under the age of 18, 8.3% from 18 to 24, 22.2% from 25 to 44, 20.3% from 45 to 64, and 29.3% who were 65 years of age or older. The median age was 44.5 years. For every 100 females, there were 107.0 males. For every 100 females age 18 and over, there were 94.4 males.

The median income for a household in the township was $78,728, and the median income for a family was $79,861. Males had a median income of $53,385 versus $40,781 for females. The per capita income for the township was $42,352. About 7.7% of families and 11.4% of the population were below the poverty line, including 27.7% of those under age 18 and 1.4% of those age 65 or over.

Historical population
Census	Pop.	Note	%±
2010	2,906		—
2020	2,891		−0.5%
U.S. Decennial Census

== Education ==
Sauk Valley Community College's main campus is in the township.

Much of Palmyra Township is in the Dixon Public Schools school district. A part to the west is in the Sterling Community Unit District 5 and a part to the north is in the Polo Community Unit School District 222. The public comprehensive high school of the Dixon district is Dixon High School.
