= Nelson, Illinois =

Nelson
- Village
- Location of Nelson in Lee County, Illinois.
- Coordinates: 41°47′51″N 89°36′17″W
- Country: United States
- State: Illinois
- County: Lee

Area
  - Total: 0.36 sq mi (0.94 km^{2})
  - Land: 0.36 sq mi (0.92 km^{2})
  - Water: 0.0039 sq mi (0.01 km^{2})
- Elevation: 653 ft (199 m)

Population (2020)
  - Total: 127
  - Density: 356.0/sq mi (137.47/km^{2})
- Time zone: UTC−6 (CST)
  - Summer (DST): UTC−5 (CDT)
- ZIP code: 61055
- Area codes: 815 & 779
- FIPS code: 17-51947
- GNIS feature ID: 2399443

Nelson is a village in Lee County, Illinois, United States. As of the 2020 census, Nelson had a population of 127.

== History ==
A post office called Nelson was first established in 1858. The village was named for Samuel Nelson, a pioneer settler.

== Geography ==
According to the 2021 census gazetteer files, Nelson has a total area of 0.22 square miles (0.57 km^{2}), of which 0.22 square miles (0.57 km^{2}) (or 98.18%) is land and 0.00 square miles (0.00 km^{2}) (or 1.82%) is water.

== Demographics ==
Historical population
Census	Pop.	Note	%±
1880	82		—
1890	48		−41.5%
1930	290		—
1940	265		−8.6%
1950	289		9.1%
1960	283		−2.1%
1970	263		−7.1%
1980	215		−18.3%
1990	200		−7.0%
2000	163		−18.5%
2010	170		4.3%
2020	127		−25.3%
U.S. Decennial Census

As of the 2020 census there were 127 people, 57 households, and 37 families residing in the village. The population density was 577.27 inhabitants per square mile (222.89/km^{2}). There were 67 housing units at an average density of 304.55 per square mile (117.59/km^{2}). The racial makeup of the village was 88.19% White, 0.79% African American, 0.00% Native American, 0.00% Asian, 0.00% Pacific Islander, 0.00% from other races, and 11.02% from two or more races. Hispanic or Latino of any race were 3.94% of the population.

There were 57 households, out of which 33.3% had children under the age of 18 living with them, 26.32% were married couples living together, 38.60% had a female householder with no husband present, and 35.09% were non-families. 17.54% of all households were made up of individuals, and 5.26% had someone living alone who was 65 years of age or older. The average household size was 2.49 and the average family size was 2.32.

The village's age distribution consisted of 23.5% under the age of 18, 5.3% from 18 to 24, 32.6% from 25 to 44, 29.5% from 45 to 64, and 9.1% who were 65 years of age or older. The median age was 38.7 years. For every 100 females, there were 51.7 males. For every 100 females age 18 and over, there were 50.7 males.

The median income for a household in the village was $33,750, and the median income for a family was $35,625. Males had a median income of $41,250 versus $31,667 for females. The per capita income for the village was $22,076. About 13.5% of families and 25.8% of the population were below the poverty line, including 45.2% of those under age 18 and 0.0% of those age 65 or over.

== Education ==
It is in the East Coloma-Nelson Consolidated Elementary School District 20 and the Rock Falls Township High School District 301.

Besides the local public schools, Christ Lutheran School, located in nearby Sterling, serves students of various religious backgrounds from Milledgeville to Walnut and from Morrison to Dixon. As part of the largest network of Protestant schools in the US, CLS provides an education for students from age 3 through 8th grade.

== Notable person ==
- Lou Bevil, pitcher for the Washington Senators
