= Dixon Township, Lee County, Illinois =

Dixon Township
- Township
- Location in Lee County

- Lee County's location in Illinois
- Coordinates: 41°52′04″N 89°27′33″W
- Country: United States
- State: Illinois
- County: Lee
- Established: November 6, 1849

Area
  - Total: 29.86 sq mi (77.3 km^{2})
  - Land: 28.95 sq mi (75.0 km^{2})
  - Water: 0.92 sq mi (2.4 km^{2}) 3.07%
- Elevation: 663 ft (202 m)

Population (2020)
  - Total: 17,379
  - Density: 600.3/sq mi (231.8/km^{2})
- Time zone: UTC-6 (CST)
  - Summer (DST): UTC-5 (CDT)
- ZIP code: 61021
- FIPS code: 17-103-20175

Dixon Township is one of twenty-two townships in Lee County, Illinois, USA. As of the 2020 census, its population was 17,379 and it contained 7,299 housing units.

== History ==
Dixon Township was established on November 6, 1849. Two additional townships were created from it; Nelson Township was created on February 28, 1860, and South Dixon Township was created on February 12, 1867.

== Geography ==
According to the 2021 census gazetteer files, Dixon Township has a total area of 29.86 square miles (77.34 km^{2}), of which 28.95 square miles (74.98 km^{2}) (or 96.93%) is land and 0.92 square miles (2.38 km^{2}) (or 3.07%) is water.

=== Cities, towns, villages ===
- Dixon (north three-quarters)

=== Cemeteries ===
The township contains these five cemeteries: Burket, Chapel Hill, Dixon State School, Mount Union and Oakwood.

== Demographics ==
As of the 2020 census there were 17,379 people, 6,600 households, and 3,469 families residing in the township. The population density was 582.00 inhabitants per square mile (224.71/km^{2}). There were 7,299 housing units at an average density of 244.43 per square mile (94.37/km^{2}). The racial makeup of the township was 79.70% White, 9.93% African American, 0.23% Native American, 0.83% Asian, 0.03% Pacific Islander, 3.68% from other races, and 5.60% from two or more races. Hispanic or Latino of any race were 8.26% of the population.

There were 6,600 households, out of which 28.20% had children under the age of 18 living with them, 40.03% were married couples living together, 10.86% had a female householder with no spouse present, and 47.44% were non-families. 40.20% of all households were made up of individuals, and 18.30% had someone living alone who was 65 years of age or older. The average household size was 2.17 and the average family size was 2.99.

The township's age distribution consisted of 18.6% under the age of 18, 6.9% from 18 to 24, 28% from 25 to 44, 28.6% from 45 to 64, and 17.9% who were 65 years of age or older. The median age was 42.6 years. For every 100 females, there were 122.0 males. For every 100 females age 18 and over, there were 123.2 males.

The median income for a household in the township was $49,760, and the median income for a family was $77,004. Males had a median income of $48,116 versus $30,344 for females. The per capita income for the township was $25,610. About 6.9% of families and 13.5% of the population were below the poverty line, including 10.7% of those under age 18 and 13.4% of those age 65 or over.

Historical population
Census	Pop.	Note	%±
2010	17,993		—
2020	17,379		−3.4%
U.S. Decennial Census

== School districts ==
- Dixon Unit School District 170

== Political districts ==
- Illinois's 14th congressional district
- State House District 90
- State Senate District 45
