= Wyoming Township, Lee County, Illinois =

Coordinates: 41°40′46″N 88°59′28″W

Wyoming Township
- Township
- Location in Lee County

- Lee County's location in Illinois
- Country: United States
- State: Illinois
- County: Lee
- Established: May 14, 1850

Government
  - Supervisor: Edgar Browder

Area
  - Total: 35.99 sq mi (93.2 km^{2})
  - Land: 35.97 sq mi (93.2 km^{2})
  - Water: 0.02 sq mi (0.052 km^{2}) 0.04%
- Elevation: 919 ft (280 m)

Population (2020)
  - Total: 1,252
  - Density: 34.81/sq mi (13.44/km^{2})
- Time zone: UTC-6 (CST)
  - Summer (DST): UTC-5 (CDT)
- FIPS code: 17-103-83674

Wyoming Township is located in Lee County, Illinois. As of the 2020 census, its population was 1,252 and it contained 576 housing units. Wyoming Township was originally named Paw Paw Township, but the name was changed on May 14, 1850.

== Geography ==
According to the 2021 census gazetteer files, Wyoming Township has a total area of 35.99 square miles (93.21 km^{2}), of which 35.97 square miles (93.16 km^{2}) (or 99.96%) is land and 0.02 square miles (0.05 km^{2}) (or 0.04%) is water.

== Demographics ==
As of the 2020 census there were 1,252 people, 527 households, and 344 families residing in the township. The population density was 34.79 inhabitants per square mile (13.43/km^{2}). There were 576 housing units at an average density of 16.01 per square mile (6.18/km^{2}). The racial makeup of the township was 90.26% White, 1.60% African American, 0.24% Native American, 0.00% Asian, 0.00% Pacific Islander, 1.76% from other races, and 6.15% from two or more races. Hispanic or Latino of any race were 5.43% of the population.

There were 527 households, out of which 26.80% had children under the age of 18 living with them, 52.18% were married couples living together, 3.98% had a female householder with no spouse present, and 34.72% were non-families. 24.70% of all households were made up of individuals, and 13.30% had someone living alone who was 65 years of age or older. The average household size was 2.55 and the average family size was 3.19.

The township's age distribution consisted of 22.5% under the age of 18, 9.4% from 18 to 24, 25% from 25 to 44, 29.4% from 45 to 64, and 13.9% who were 65 years of age or older. The median age was 37.8 years. For every 100 females, there were 110.3 males. For every 100 females age 18 and over, there were 118.9 males.

The median income for a household in the township was $55,481, and the median income for a family was $68,636. Males had a median income of $42,462 versus $24,464 for females. The per capita income for the township was $26,923. About 6.4% of families and 9.0% of the population were below the poverty line, including 6.1% of those under age 18 and 2.7% of those age 65 or over.

Historical population
Census	Pop.	Note	%±
2010	1,376		—
2020	1,252		−9.0%
U.S. Decennial Census
