= West Brooklyn, Illinois =

West Brooklyn
- Village
- Location of West Brooklyn in Lee County, Illinois.
- Coordinates: 41°41′36″N 89°08′51″W
- Country: United States
- State: Illinois
- County: Lee
- Incorporated: September 24, 1894

Area
  - Total: 0.093 sq mi (0.24 km^{2})
  - Land: 0.093 sq mi (0.24 km^{2})
  - Water: 0 sq mi (0.00 km^{2})
- Elevation: 945 ft (288 m)

Population (2020)
  - Total: 131
  - Density: 1,400.9/sq mi (540.89/km^{2})
- Time zone: UTC-6 (CST)
  - Summer (DST): UTC-5 (CDT)
- ZIP code: 61378
- Area codes: 815 & 779
- FIPS code: 17-80008
- GNIS feature ID: 2400127

West Brooklyn is a village in Lee County, Illinois, United States. As of the 2020 census, West Brooklyn had a population of 131.

== History ==
- Henry F. Gehant (1863–1927), farmer, merchant, and banker, served in the Illinois General Assembly; he also served as president of the West Brooklyn Village Board.

== Geography ==
According to the 2021 census gazetteer files, West Brooklyn has a total area of 0.09 square miles (0.23 km^{2}), all land.

== Demographics ==
Historical population
Census	Pop.	Note	%±
1900	279		—
1910	266		−4.7%
1920	190		−28.6%
1930	201		5.8%
1940	185		−8.0%
1950	194		4.9%
1960	182		−6.2%
1970	225		23.6%
1980	210		−6.7%
1990	164		−21.9%
2000	174		6.1%
2010	142		−18.4%
2020	131		−7.7%
U.S. Decennial Census

As of the 2020 census there were 131 people, 63 households, and 48 families residing in the village. The population density was 1,541.18 inhabitants per square mile (595.05/km^{2}). There were 58 housing units at an average density of 682.35 per square mile (263.46/km^{2}). The racial makeup of the village was 83.97% White, 0.76% African American, 0.00% Native American, 1.53% Asian, 0.00% Pacific Islander, 5.34% from other races, and 8.40% from two or more races. Hispanic or Latino of any race were 9.92% of the population.

There were 63 households, out of which 19.0% had children under the age of 18 living with them, 63.49% were married couples living together, 9.52% had a female householder with no husband present, and 23.81% were non-families. 23.81% of all households were made up of individuals, and 12.70% had someone living alone who was 65 years of age or older. The average household size was 3.52 and the average family size was 2.97.

The village's age distribution consisted of 37.4% under the age of 18, 2.7% from 18 to 24, 13.3% from 25 to 44, 26.2% from 45 to 64, and 20.3% who were 65 years of age or older. The median age was 39.5 years. For every 100 females, there were 114.9 males. For every 100 females age 18 and over, there were 120.8 males.

The median income for a household in the village was $65,417, and the median income for a family was $62,500. Males had a median income of $21,667 versus $40,417 for females. The per capita income for the village was $24,687. About 10.4% of families and 13.9% of the population were below the poverty line, including 20.0% of those under age 18 and 7.9% of those age 65 or over.

== Education ==
It is in the Mendota Community Consolidated School District 289 and the Mendota Township High School District 280.

== Religion ==
There is one church located in West Brooklyn, St. Mary of the Assumption Catholic Parish.
