= Amboy Township, Lee County, Illinois =

Amboy Township
- Township
- Location in Lee County

- Lee County's location in Illinois
- Coordinates: 41°42′55″N 89°20′32″W
- Country: United States
- State: Illinois
- County: Lee
- Established: November 6, 1849

Government
  - Supervisor: Dennis McCoy

Area
  - Total: 35.48 sq mi (91.9 km^{2})
  - Land: 35.31 sq mi (91.5 km^{2})
  - Water: 0.18 sq mi (0.47 km^{2}) 0.49%
- Elevation: 750 ft (230 m)

Population (2020)
  - Total: 2,820
  - Density: 79.9/sq mi (30.8/km^{2})
- Time zone: UTC-6 (CST)
  - Summer (DST): UTC-5 (CDT)
- ZIP codes: 61021, 61310
- FIPS code: 17-103-01283

Amboy Township is one of twenty-two townships in Lee County, Illinois, USA. As of the 2020 census, its population was 2,820 and it contained 1,331 housing units.

== Geography ==
According to the 2021 census gazetteer files, Amboy Township has a total area of 35.48 square miles (91.89 km^{2}), of which 35.31 square miles (91.45 km^{2}) (or 99.51%) is land and 0.18 square miles (0.47 km^{2}) (or 0.49%) is water.

=== Cities, towns, villages ===
- Amboy (east three-quarters)

=== Unincorporated towns ===
- Binghampton at 41.7167°N 89.303983°W

(This list is based on USGS data and may include former settlements.)

=== Extinct towns ===
- Shelburn at 41.697533°N 89.347317°W

(These towns are listed as "historical" by the USGS.)

=== Cemeteries ===
The township contains these four cemeteries: Binghampton, Mormon, Prairie Repose and Saint Patrick's.

=== Airports and landing strips ===
- Taylor Airport

== Demographics ==
As of the 2020 census there were 2,820 people, 1,166 households, and 783 families residing in the township. The population density was 79.47 inhabitants per square mile (30.68/km^{2}). There were 1,331 housing units at an average density of 37.51 per square mile (14.48/km^{2}). The racial makeup of the township was 92.45% White, 0.67% African American, 0.18% Native American, 0.57% Asian, 0.04% Pacific Islander, 1.38% from other races, and 4.72% from two or more races. Hispanic or Latino of any race were 4.26% of the population.

There were 1,166 households, out of which 26.90% had children under the age of 18 living with them, 51.03% were married couples living together, 9.43% had a female householder with no spouse present, and 32.85% were non-families. 28.00% of all households were made up of individuals, and 11.70% had someone living alone who was 65 years of age or older. The average household size was 2.42 and the average family size was 2.92.

The township's age distribution consisted of 23.1% under the age of 18, 7.0% from 18 to 24, 20.2% from 25 to 44, 29.4% from 45 to 64, and 20.2% who were 65 years of age or older. The median age was 44.3 years. For every 100 females, there were 100.9 males. For every 100 females age 18 and over, there were 100.5 males.

The median income for a household in the township was $59,815, and the median income for a family was $72,287. Males had a median income of $41,899 versus $27,306 for females. The per capita income for the township was $28,312. About 6.0% of families and 12.4% of the population were below the poverty line, including 14.9% of those under age 18 and 9.8% of those age 65 or over.

Historical population
Census	Pop.	Note	%±
2010	3,108		—
2020	2,820		−9.3%
U.S. Decennial Census

== School districts ==
- Amboy Community Unit School District 272
- Ashton Community Unit School District 275

== Political districts ==
- Illinois's 14th congressional district
- State House District 90
- State Senate District 45
