= East Grove Township, Lee County, Illinois =

East Grove Township
- Township
- Location in Lee County

- Lee County's location in Illinois
- Coordinates: 41°38′07″N 89°27′09″W
- Country: United States
- State: Illinois
- County: Lee
- Established: November 9, 1864

Area
  - Total: 35.63 sq mi (92.3 km^{2})
  - Land: 35.57 sq mi (92.1 km^{2})
  - Water: 0.06 sq mi (0.16 km^{2}) 0.16%
- Elevation: 750 ft (230 m)

Population (2020)
  - Total: 245
  - Density: 6.89/sq mi (2.66/km^{2})
- Time zone: UTC-6 (CST)
  - Summer (DST): UTC-5 (CDT)
- ZIP codes: 61042, 61310, 61349
- FIPS code: 17-103-21865

East Grove Township is one of twenty-two townships in Lee County, Illinois, United States. As of the 2020 census, its population was 245 and it contained 118 housing units.

== History ==
East Grove was created from Hamilton Township on November 9, 1864.

== Geography ==
According to the 2021 census gazetteer files, East Grove Township has a total area of 35.63 square miles (92.28 km^{2}), of which 35.57 square miles (92.13 km^{2}) (or 99.84%) is land and 0.06 square miles (0.16 km^{2}) (or 0.16%) is water.

=== Cemeteries ===
The township contains these three cemeteries: Saint Mary's, Stevens and Williams.

== Demographics ==
As of the 2020 census there were 245 people, 96 households, and 58 families residing in the township. The population density was 6.88 inhabitants per square mile (2.66/km^{2}). There were 118 housing units at an average density of 3.31 per square mile (1.28/km^{2}). The racial makeup of the township was 95.10% White, 0.00% African American, 0.00% Native American, 0.41% Asian, 0.00% Pacific Islander, 2.04% from other races, and 2.45% from two or more races. Hispanic or Latino of any race were 3.27% of the population.

There were 96 households, out of which 16.70% had children under the age of 18 living with them, 58.33% were married couples living together, 2.08% had a female householder with no spouse present, and 39.58% were non-families. 24.00% of all households were made up of individuals, and 9.40% had someone living alone who was 65 years of age or older. The average household size was 2.40 and the average family size was 2.60.

The township's age distribution consisted of 9.1% under the age of 18, 7.0% from 18 to 24, 32.6% from 25 to 44, 34.4% from 45 to 64, and 17.0% who were 65 years of age or older. The median age was 46.3 years. For every 100 females, there were 144.7 males. For every 100 females age 18 and over, there were 148.8 males.

The median income for a family was $138,750. Males had a median income of $30,000 versus $44,286 for females. The per capita income for the township was $42,544. About 0.0% of families and 16.5% of the population were below the poverty line, including 0.0% of those under age 18 and 0.0% of those age 65 or over.

Historical population
Census	Pop.	Note	%±
2010	256		—
2020	245		−4.3%
U.S. Decennial Census

== School districts ==
- Amboy Community Unit School District 272

== Political districts ==
- Illinois's 14th congressional district
- State House District 90
- State Senate District 45
