= May Township =

May Township may refer to:

== Illinois ==
- May Township, Lee County, Illinois
- May Township, Christian County, Illinois

== Kansas ==
- May Day Township, Riley County, Kansas, in Riley County, Kansas

== Minnesota ==
- May Township, Cass County, Minnesota
- May Township, Washington County, Minnesota

== Missouri ==
- May Township, Platte County, Missouri

== Nebraska ==
- May Township, Kearney County, Nebraska
