= Franklin Grove, Illinois =

- Village
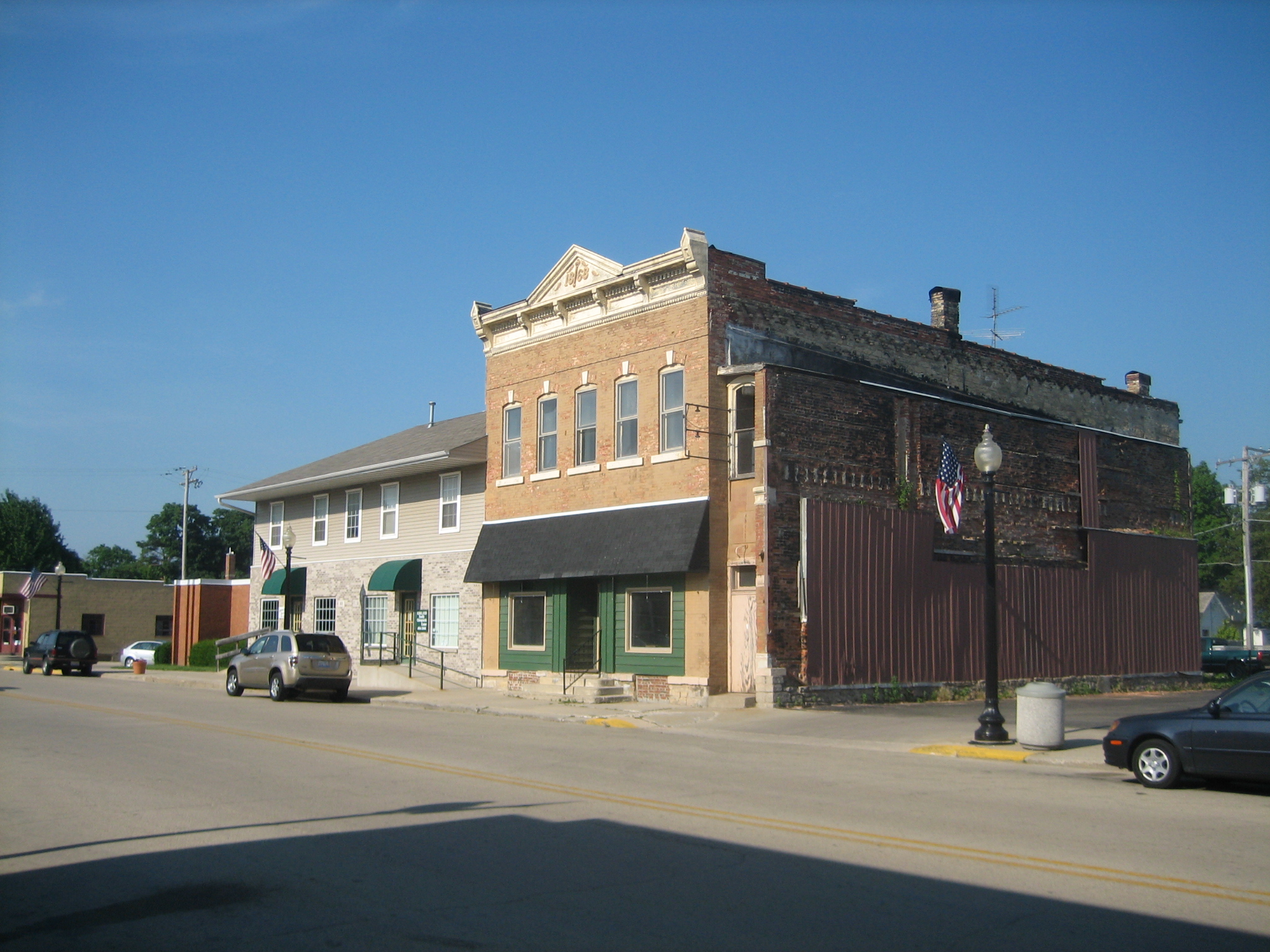
- The small commercial district in Franklin Grove

- Location of Franklin Grove in Lee County, Illinois.
- Coordinates: 41°50′29″N 89°18′00″W
- Country: United States
- State: Illinois
- County: Lee

Area
  - Total: 0.43 sq mi (1.11 km^{2})
  - Land: 0.43 sq mi (1.11 km^{2})
  - Water: 0 sq mi (0.00 km^{2})
- Elevation: 810 ft (250 m)

Population (2020)
  - Total: 896
  - Density: 2,090/sq mi (806.9/km^{2})
- Time zone: UTC-6 (CST)
  - Summer (DST): UTC-5 (CDT)
- ZIP code: 61031
- Area code: 815
- FIPS code: 17-27689
- GNIS feature ID: 2398918
- Website: franklingrove.org

Franklin Grove is a village in Lee County, Illinois, United States. As of the 2020 census, Franklin Grove had a population of 896.

== History ==
Franklin Grove was named for James R. Franklin, a pioneer who settled in a grove near the town site.

The Lincoln Highway Association (LHA) maintains a national tourist center in Franklin Grove, in a historic building built by Harry Isaac Lincoln, a cousin of Abraham Lincoln. The LHA is a national organization dedicated to the preservation and promotion of the Lincoln Highway, the first road across the United States of America, which was routed through Franklin Grove.

The Nachusa Grasslands, a prairie restoration operated by the Nature Conservancy, began operating in 1986.

== Geography ==
According to the 2021 census gazetteer files, Franklin Grove has a total area of 0.47 square miles (1.22 km^{2}), all land.

=== Churches ===
Franklin Grove has four churches within the city limits: The Franklin Grove United Methodist Church, Church of the Brethren, First Presbyterian and St. Paul's Lutheran Church.

== Demographics ==
Historical population
Census	Pop.	Note	%±
1870	757		—
1880	730		−3.6%
1890	736		0.8%
1900	681		−7.5%
1910	572		−16.0%
1920	589		3.0%
1930	625		6.1%
1940	645		3.2%
1950	741		14.9%
1960	773		4.3%
1970	968		25.2%
1980	965		−0.3%
1990	968		0.3%
2000	1,052		8.7%
2010	1,021		−2.9%
2020	896		−12.2%
U.S. Decennial Census

As of the 2020 census there were 896 people, 403 households, and 179 families residing in the village. The population density was 1,918.63 inhabitants per square mile (740.79/km^{2}). There were 391 housing units at an average density of 837.26 per square mile (323.27/km^{2}). The racial makeup of the village was 93.64% White, 0.11% African American, 0.11% Native American, 0.56% Asian, 0.11% Pacific Islander, 1.45% from other races, and 4.02% from two or more races. Hispanic or Latino of any race were 4.35% of the population.

There were 403 households, out of which 20.6% had children under the age of 18 living with them, 33.25% were married couples living together, 8.93% had a female householder with no husband present, and 55.58% were non-families. 48.39% of all households were made up of individuals, and 31.02% had someone living alone who was 65 years of age or older. The average household size was 3.28 and the average family size was 2.10.

The village's age distribution consisted of 19.2% under the age of 18, 12.1% from 18 to 24, 17.2% from 25 to 44, 18.7% from 45 to 64, and 32.8% who were 65 years of age or older. The median age was 46.3 years. For every 100 females, there were 93.5 males. For every 100 females age 18 and over, there were 103.7 males.

The median income for a household in the village was $46,080, and the median income for a family was $73,281. Males had a median income of $45,859 versus $22,500 for females. The per capita income for the village was $27,341. About 5.0% of families and 8.5% of the population were below the poverty line, including 11.5% of those under age 18 and 6.3% of those age 65 or over.

== Education ==
It is in the Ashton Community Unit School District 275.

== See also ==
- Banditti of the Prairie
