= Steward, Illinois =

Steward
- Village
- Location of Steward in Lee County, Illinois.
- Coordinates: 41°50′54″N 89°01′12″W
- Country: United States
- State: Illinois
- County: Lee

Area
  - Total: 0.13 sq mi (0.34 km^{2})
  - Land: 0.13 sq mi (0.34 km^{2})
  - Water: 0 sq mi (0.00 km^{2})
- Elevation: 824 ft (251 m)

Population (2020)
  - Total: 229
  - Density: 1,735.8/sq mi (670.19/km^{2})
- Time zone: UTC-6 (CST)
  - Summer (DST): UTC-5 (CDT)
- ZIP code: 60553
- Area codes: 815 & 779
- FIPS code: 17-72624
- GNIS feature ID: 2399898
- Website: www.stewardil.com

Steward is a village in Lee County, Illinois, United States. As of the 2020 census, Steward had a population of 229.

== History ==
Steward, Illinois, was named for Wesley Steward, who in 1855 came to this area in Alto Township to settle the land owned by his father, Marcus Steward. John Grimes built the first house in Alto Township in Plum Thicket in 1847, located east on the outskirts of the village as it is today. In 1861, Mr. Steward married and built the first farm house in the location of Steward, which is still standing. The town is located in the west central part of Alto Township and the northeast part of Lee County. Mr. Steward was influential in getting the Chicago and Iowa Railroad, now known as the Burlington Northern, through the township extending from Hinckley, Illinois to Rochelle, Illinois completed in 1870. The Village Hall on Main Street is one of the oldest buildings in existence and the jail cells bought in 1903 and housed in the building are still one of the few reminders of the early days (not used). In 1872 Mr. Steward built the first elevator at the east end of Main Street run by steam. The history of the elevators in Steward over the years is a story in itself. The first house in Steward after the town's formation is on John Street, also standing today, built in 1872.

The railroad offices and warehouse were in Wesley Steward's barn until 1871, when the first depot was then built. It is said to have burned down in 1894. The present depot, no longer in use by the Burlington Northern and in the process of being salvaged by a group in interested citizens of the village as a historical landmark, a museum, library, and social meeting place for anyone in the community, was built in 1896. This project “The Steward Illinois Depot Project, Inc.” was being projected as a Bicentennial venture during the 1976 year. In 1902 Steward was selected as the junctional point for the Chicago, Milwaukee and St. Paul Railroad Company as they recognized the need for a railroad to run south out of Rockford, Illinois. The Milwaukee depot and switch tower for both railroads were on the northwest edge of town.

The first businesses were a restaurant and general merchandise store built in 1871. By the early 1900s, business houses were located on both sides of Main Street with a steady growth and expansion until the depression days when the town could then gradually see a decline in the businesses. The charter for the First National Bank of Steward was signed and issued on December 18, 1902. A new building was erected and business started January 2, 1903, and continued till 1933. The first Post Office was established at Heaton August 31, 1871, and located in the Steward depot. It was relocated in Steward April 12, 1876. Today it is located in the old bank building on Main Street. By 1976, the village became mostly a residential community with the exception of the Post Office.

== Geography ==
According to the 2021 census gazetteer files, Steward has a total area of 0.27 square miles (0.70 km^{2}), all land.

== Demographics ==
Historical population
| Census | Pop. | Note | %± |
|---|---|---|---|
| 1910 | 353 | | — |
| 1920 | 253 | | −28.3% |
| 1930 | 230 | | −9.1% |
| 1940 | 244 | | 6.1% |
| 1950 | 270 | | 10.7% |
| 1960 | 264 | | −2.2% |
| 1970 | 308 | | 16.7% |
| 1980 | 298 | | −3.2% |
| 1990 | 282 | | −5.4% |
| 2000 | 271 | | −3.9% |
| 2010 | 256 | | −5.5% |
| 2020 | 229 | | −10.5% |
U.S. Decennial Census

As of the 2020 census there were 229 people, 126 households, and 80 families residing in the village. The population density was 851.30 inhabitants per square mile (328.69/km^{2}). There were 102 housing units at an average density of 379.18 per square mile (146.40/km^{2}). The racial makeup of the village was 93.01% White, 0.44% African American, 0.00% Native American, 0.00% Asian, 0.00% Pacific Islander, 3.49% from other races, and 3.06% from two or more races. Hispanic or Latino of any race were 4.37% of the population.

There were 126 households, out of which 25.4% had children under the age of 18 living with them, 59.52% were married couples living together, 1.59% had a female householder with no husband present, and 36.51% were non-families. 23.02% of all households were made up of individuals, and 7.14% had someone living alone who was 65 years of age or older. The average household size was 3.20 and the average family size was 2.78.

The village's age distribution consisted of 19.4% under the age of 18, 7.7% from 18 to 24, 19.7% from 25 to 44, 41% from 45 to 64, and 12.0% who were 65 years of age or older. The median age was 48.3 years. For every 100 females, there were 91.3 males. For every 100 females age 18 and over, there were 95.8 males.

The median income for a household in the village was $81,875, and the median income for a family was $96,667. Males had a median income of $43,500 versus $26,406 for females. The per capita income for the village was $32,691. About 1.3% of families and 11.6% of the population were below the poverty line, including 12.9% of those under age 18 and 2.4% of those age 65 or over.

== Education ==
Steward has one public school in its district (district #220) named Steward Elementary School. This school serves children ages Kindergarten through 8th grade. The mascot is an Eagle. The high school district is Rochelle Township High School District 212.

== Notable person ==
- Leroy Herrmann, pitcher with the Chicago Cubs and Cincinnati Reds
