= Compton, Illinois =

Compton Melugin Grove (1841-1873)
- Village
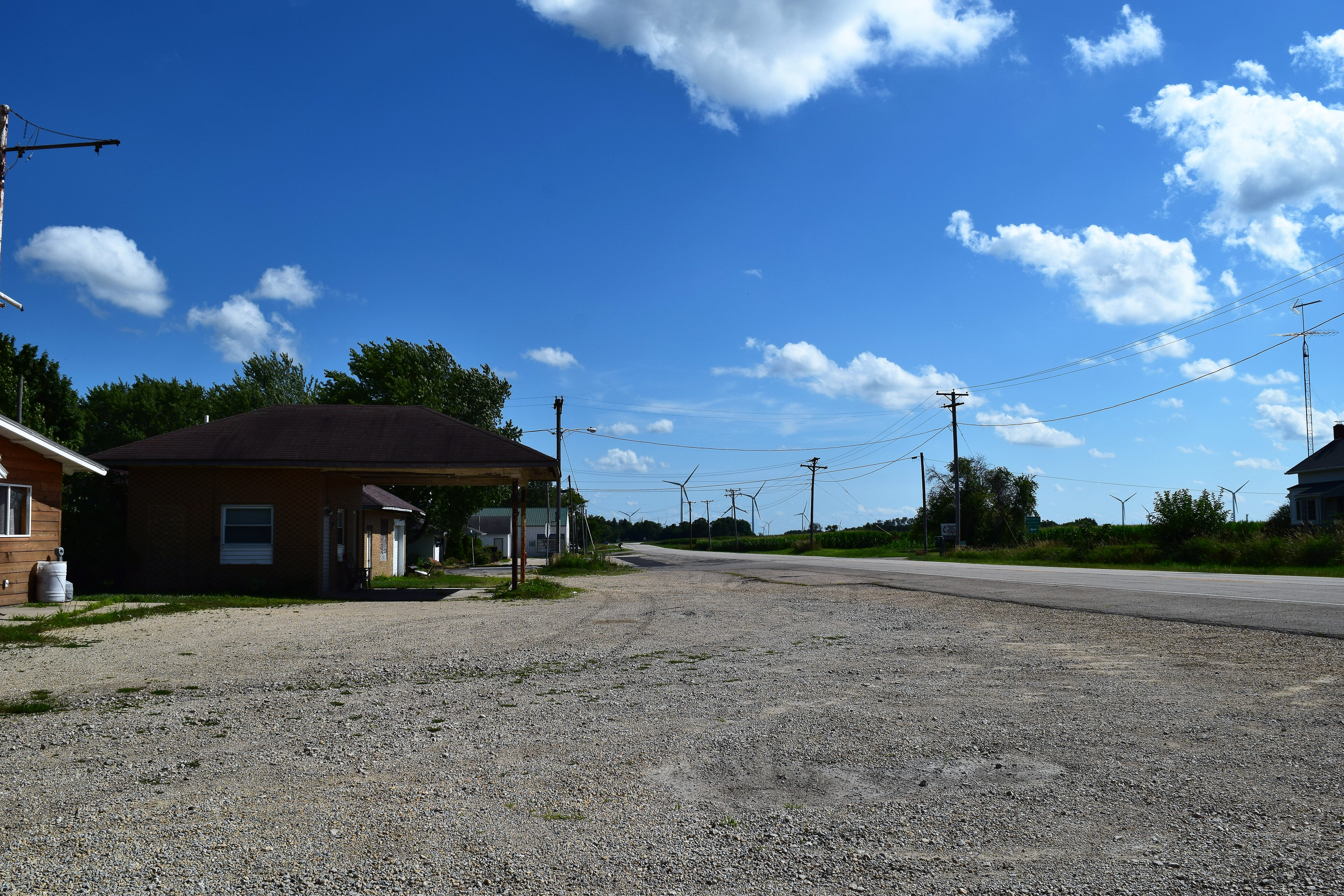
- Looking south at Compton on IL 251

- Location of Compton in Lee County, Illinois.
- Coordinates: 41°41′39″N 89°05′11″W
- Country: United States
- State: Illinois
- County: Lee
- Founded: 1875

Area
  - Total: 0.17 sq mi (0.43 km^{2})
  - Land: 0.17 sq mi (0.43 km^{2})
  - Water: 0 sq mi (0.00 km^{2})
- Elevation: 974 ft (297 m)

Population (2020)
  - Total: 274
  - Density: 1,661/sq mi (641.4/km^{2})
- Time zone: UTC-6 (CST)
  - Summer (DST): UTC-5 (CDT)
- ZIP code: 61318
- Area codes: 815 & 779
- FIPS code: 17-15989
- GNIS feature ID: 2398609

Compton is a village in Brooklyn Township, Lee County, Illinois, United States. As of the 2020 census, Compton had a population of 274.

== History ==
A post office at the site of Compton opened on May 18, 1841; it was named Melugin Grove after the village's first settler, Zachariah Melugin. The village's name was changed to Compton on July 16, 1873, after Joel Compton.

== Geography ==
Compton is located on the plains of north central Illinois. The town is served by US Route 30 & US Route 51 and is about ten miles north of Mendota.

According to the 2021 census gazetteer files, Compton has a total area of 0.16 square miles (0.41 km^{2}), all land.

== Demographics ==
Historical population
Census	Pop.	Note	%±
1880	300		—
1890	234		−22.0%
1900	428		82.9%
1910	387		−9.6%
1920	283		−26.9%
1930	277		−2.1%
1940	300		8.3%
1950	321		7.0%
1960	366		14.0%
1970	399		9.0%
1980	376		−5.8%
1990	343		−8.8%
2000	347		1.2%
2010	303		−12.7%
2020	274		−9.6%
U.S. Decennial Census

As of the 2020 census there were 274 people, 101 households, and 66 families residing in the village. The population density was 1,734.18 inhabitants per square mile (669.57/km^{2}). There were 127 housing units at an average density of 803.80 per square mile (310.35/km^{2}). The racial makeup of the village was 94.16% White, 0.36% African American, 0.00% Native American, 0.36% Asian, 0.00% Pacific Islander, 0.73% from other races, and 4.38% from two or more races. Hispanic or Latino of any race were 8.76% of the population.

There were 101 households, out of which 28.7% had children under the age of 18 living with them, 48.51% were married couples living together, 5.94% had a female householder with no husband present, and 34.65% were non-families. 24.75% of all households were made up of individuals, and 2.97% had someone living alone who was 65 years of age or older. The average household size was 3.00 and the average family size was 2.64.

The village's age distribution consisted of 25.5% under the age of 18, 7.5% from 18 to 24, 32.6% from 25 to 44, 18.7% from 45 to 64, and 15.7% who were 65 years of age or older. The median age was 35.5 years. For every 100 females, there were 130.2 males. For every 100 females age 18 and over, there were 139.8 males.

The median income for a household in the village was $47,321, and the median income for a family was $50,714. Males had a median income of $42,500 versus $25,000 for females. The per capita income for the village was $24,218. About 9.1% of families and 19.3% of the population were below the poverty line, including 14.0% of those under age 18 and 0.0% of those age 65 or over.

== Education ==
It is in the Mendota Community Consolidated School District 289 and the Mendota Township High School District 280.

== Notable person ==
- Joe Zdeb, outfielder for the Kansas City Royals
