= Harmon Township, Lee County, Illinois =

Coordinates: 41°43′07″N 89°34′33″W

Harmon Township
- Township
- Location in Lee County

- Lee County's location in Illinois
- Country: United States
- State: Illinois
- County: Lee
- Established: March 3, 1857

Government
  - Supervisor: Christopher Norberg

Area
  - Total: 35.86 sq mi (92.9 km^{2})
  - Land: 35.86 sq mi (92.9 km^{2})
  - Water: 0 sq mi (0 km^{2}) 0%

Population (2020)
  - Total: 349
  - Density: 9.73/sq mi (3.76/km^{2})
- Time zone: UTC-6 (CST)
  - Summer (DST): UTC-5 (CDT)
- FIPS code: 17-103-32980

Harmon Township is located in Lee County, Illinois. As of the 2020 census, its population was 349 and it contained 157 housing units. Harmon Township was formed from Marion Township on March 3, 1857.

== Geography ==
According to the 2021 census gazetteer files, Harmon Township has a total area of 35.86 square miles (92.88 km^{2}), all land.

== Demographics ==
As of the 2020 census there were 349 people, 166 households, and 129 families residing in the township. The population density was 9.73 inhabitants per square mile (3.76/km^{2}). There were 157 housing units at an average density of 4.38 per square mile (1.69/km^{2}). The racial makeup of the township was 90.83% White, 0.00% African American, 1.15% Native American, 0.00% Asian, 0.00% Pacific Islander, 1.15% from other races, and 6.88% from two or more races. Hispanic or Latino of any race were 5.44% of the population.

There were 166 households, out of which 38.60% had children under the age of 18 living with them, 71.69% were married couples living together, 4.82% had a female householder with no spouse present, and 22.29% were non-families. 12.70% of all households were made up of individuals, and 7.80% had someone living alone who was 65 years of age or older. The average household size was 2.78 and the average family size was 3.22.

The township's age distribution consisted of 29.3% under the age of 18, 4.8% from 18 to 24, 20.8% from 25 to 44, 28.2% from 45 to 64, and 16.9% who were 65 years of age or older. The median age was 40.0 years. For every 100 females, there were 119.5 males. For every 100 females age 18 and over, there were 118.8 males.

The median income for a household in the township was $49,265, and the median income for a family was $66,250. Males had a median income of $42,917 versus $24,432 for females. The per capita income for the township was $22,817. About 21.7% of families and 19.1% of the population were below the poverty line, including 3.7% of those under age 18 and 50.0% of those age 65 or over.

Historical population
Census	Pop.	Note	%±
2010	378		—
2020	349		−7.7%
U.S. Decennial Census
