= May Township, Lee County, Illinois =

Coordinates: 41°38′37″N 89°19′35″W

May Township
- Township
- Location in Lee County

- Lee County's location in Illinois
- Country: United States
- State: Illinois
- County: Lee
- Established: September 1854

Government
  - Supervisor: Brian Russell

Area
  - Total: 35.65 sq mi (92.3 km^{2})
  - Land: 35.45 sq mi (91.8 km^{2})
  - Water: 0.20 sq mi (0.52 km^{2}) 0.57%
- Elevation: 925 ft (282 m)

Population (2020)
  - Total: 277
  - Density: 7.81/sq mi (3.02/km^{2})
- Time zone: UTC-6 (CST)
  - Summer (DST): UTC-5 (CDT)
- FIPS code: 17-103-47644

May Township is located in Lee County, Illinois. As of the 2020 census, its population was 277 and it contained 113 housing units. May Township was formed from Hamilton Township in September, 1854.

== Geography ==
According to the 2021 census gazetteer files, May Township has a total area of 35.65 square miles (92.33 km^{2}), of which 35.45 square miles (91.82 km^{2}) (or 99.43%) is land and 0.20 square miles (0.52 km^{2}) (or 0.57%) is water.

== Demographics ==
As of the 2020 census there were 277 people, 100 households, and 69 families residing in the township. The population density was 7.77 inhabitants per square mile (3.00/km^{2}). There were 113 housing units at an average density of 3.17 per square mile (1.22/km^{2}). The racial makeup of the township was 93.14% White, 0.72% African American, 0.00% Native American, 0.00% Asian, 0.00% Pacific Islander, 1.08% from other races, and 5.05% from two or more races. Hispanic or Latino of any race were 3.61% of the population.

There were 100 households, out of which 33.00% had children under the age of 18 living with them, 69.00% were married couples living together, 0.00% had a female householder with no spouse present, and 31.00% were non-families. 31.00% of all households were made up of individuals, and 13.00% had someone living alone who was 65 years of age or older. The average household size was 2.74 and the average family size was 3.52.

The township's age distribution consisted of 34.3% under the age of 18, 6.6% from 18 to 24, 23.4% from 25 to 44, 20.7% from 45 to 64, and 15.0% who were 65 years of age or older. The median age was 38.1 years. For every 100 females, there were 90.3 males. For every 100 females age 18 and over, there were 119.5 males.

The median income for a household in the township was $138,000, and the median income for a family was $171,339. Males had a median income of $56,875 versus $29,750 for females. The per capita income for the township was $53,112. About 0.0% of families and 0.0% of the population were below the poverty line, including 0.0% of those under age 18 and 0.0% of those age 65 or over.

Historical population
Census	Pop.	Note	%±
2010	304		—
2020	277		−8.9%
U.S. Decennial Census
