= Lee County, Illinois =

County in Illinois, United States

- County
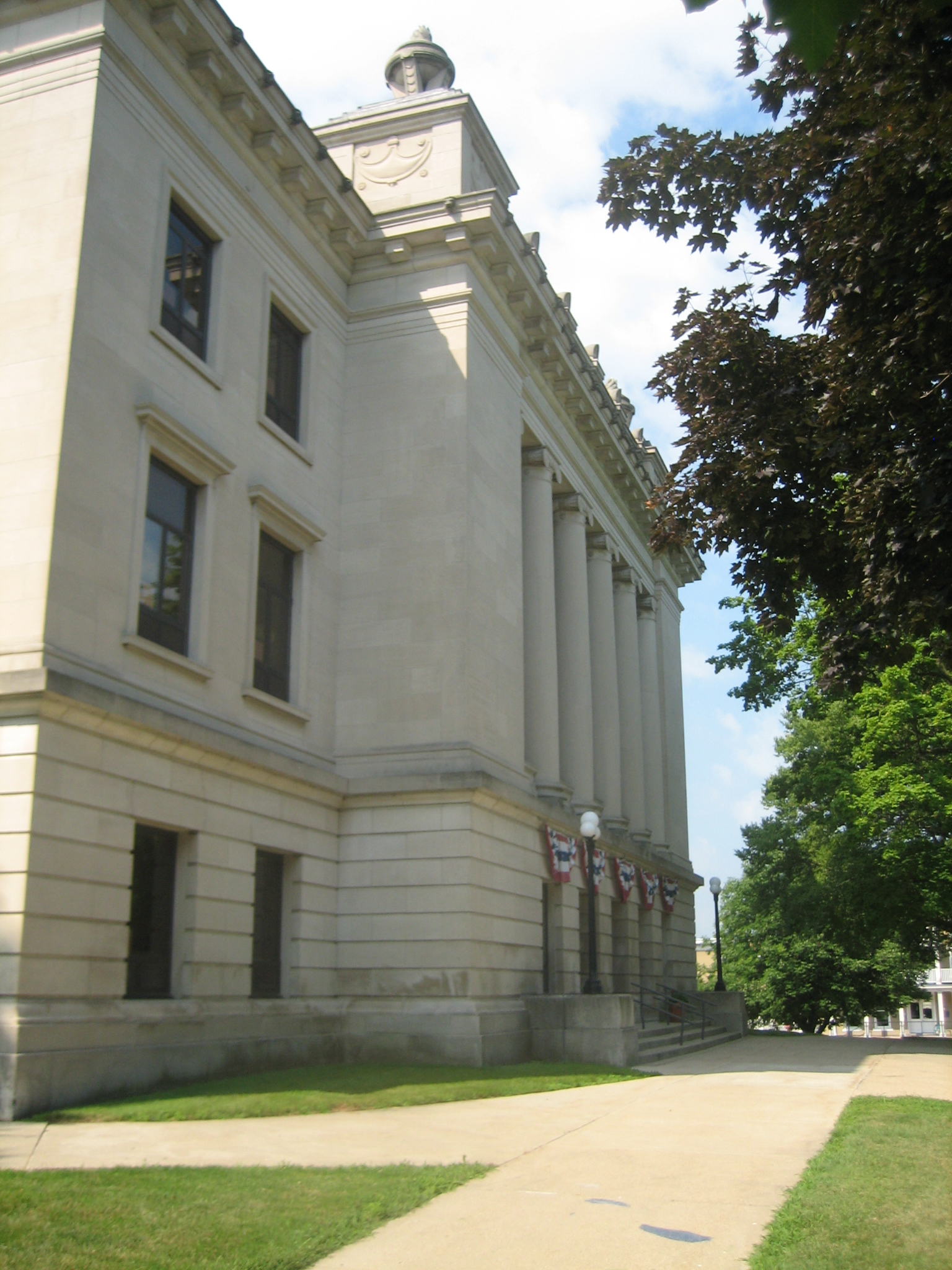
- Lee County Courthouse

- Location within the U.S. state of Illinois
- Coordinates: 41°45′N 89°18′W
- Country: United States
- State: Illinois
- Founded: February 27, 1839
- Named for: Henry Lee III
- Seat: Dixon
- Largest city: Dixon

Area
  - Total: 729 sq mi (1,890 km^{2})
  - Land: 725 sq mi (1,880 km^{2})
  - Water: 4.1 sq mi (11 km^{2}) 0.6%

Population (2020)
  - Total: 34,145
  - Estimate (2025): 32,914 ▼
  - Density: 47.1/sq mi (18.2/km^{2})
- Time zone: UTC−6 (Central)
  - Summer (DST): UTC−5 (CDT)
- Congressional district: 16th
- Website: www.leecountyil.com

Lee County is a county located in the U.S. state of Illinois. According to the 2020 census, it has a population of 34,145. Its county seat is Dixon. The Dixon, IL Micropolitan Statistical Area includes all of Lee County.

== History ==
The area's first non-native settlers were mostly from the six New England states. The early nineteenth century saw a wave of westward movement from New England, due largely to completion of the Erie Canal and the end of the Black Hawk War.

The area that included present-day Lee County was delineated as St. Clair County in 1809. In 1823, a large section of northern St. Clair County was partitioned off as Fulton County. In 1825, the northwestern portion of that county was partitioned off as Putnam County. In 1831, the area was further partitioned into Jo Daviess County. A section of that county was partitioned off in 1836 as Ogle County, and in 1839 the bottom half of Ogle County was split off as Lee County. It is largely understood that the county's name honors "Lighthorse Harry" Lee, an officer in the American Revolutionary War. An alternative theory suggests the name honors Richard Henry Lee, a member of the Continental Congress (the Declaration of Independence was adopted pursuant to the Lee Resolution).

President Ronald Reagan lived in Dixon as a boy and attended Dixon High School.

On April 9, 2015, an EF4 tornado touched down at 6:39 p.m. CDT (23:39 p.m. GMT).

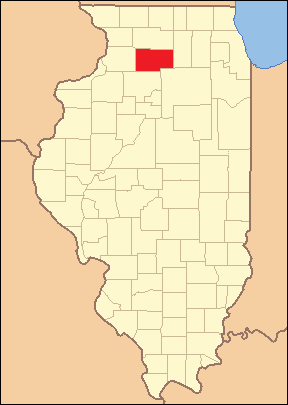
Lee County's boundaries have remained unchanged since its creation in 1839.

== Geography ==
According to the US Census Bureau, the county has a total area of 729 square miles (1,890 km^{2}), of which 725 square miles (1,880 km^{2}) is land and 4.1 square miles (11 km^{2}) (0.6%) is water.

=== Adjacent counties ===
- Ogle County – north
- DeKalb County – east
- LaSalle County - southeast, south
- Bureau County – south, southwest
- Whiteside County – west

=== Climate and weather ===
Dixon, Illinois

Climate chart (precipitation, max. and min. temperature)
J	F	M	A	M	J	J	A	S	O	N	D
1.6 26 10	1.4 32 15	2.6 44 27	3.6 58 37	4.3 70 48	4.9 79 58	3.5 82 62	4.5 80 60	3.3 73 51	2.7 62 39	2.8 45 28	2.1 35 17
- █ Average max. and min. temperatures in °F
- █ Precipitation totals in inches
- Source: The Weather Channel
Metric conversion
J	F	M	A	M	J	J	A	S	O	N	D
41 −3 −12	36 0 −9	65 7 −3	92 14 3	110 21 9	124 26 14	88 28 17	114 27 16	84 23 11	69 17 4	72 7 −2	54 2 −8
- █ Average max. and min. temperatures in °C
- █ Precipitation totals in mm

In recent years, average temperatures in the county seat of Dixon have ranged from a low of 10 °F (−12 °C) in January to a high of 82 °F (28 °C) in July, although a record low of −27 °F (−33 °C) was recorded in January 1999 and a record high of 110 °F (43 °C) was recorded in July 1936. Average monthly precipitation ranges from 1.43 inches (36 mm) in February to 4.88 inches (124 mm) in June.

=== Major highways ===
- Interstate 39
- Interstate 88
- U.S. Highway 30
- U.S. Highway 51
- U.S. Highway 52
- Illinois Route 2
- Illinois Route 26
- Illinois Route 38
- Illinois Route 110
- Illinois Route 251

=== Other features ===
- Green River Ordnance Plant
- Mendota Hills Wind Farm

== Demographics ==
Historical population
Census	Pop.	Note	%±
1840	2,035		—
1850	5,292		160.0%
1860	17,651		233.5%
1870	27,171		53.9%
1880	27,491		1.2%
1890	26,187		−4.7%
1900	29,894		14.2%
1910	27,750		−7.2%
1920	28,004		0.9%
1930	32,329		15.4%
1940	34,604		7.0%
1950	36,451		5.3%
1960	38,749		6.3%
1970	37,947		−2.1%
1980	36,328		−4.3%
1990	34,392		−5.3%
2000	36,062		4.9%
2010	36,031		−0.1%
2020	34,145		−5.2%
2025 (est.)	32,914	▼	−3.6%
US Decennial Census; 1790-1960 1900-1990; 1990-2000 2010

=== 2020 census ===
As of the 2020 census, the county had a population of 34,145. The median age was 43.7 years. 19.7% of residents were under the age of 18 and 20.0% of residents were 65 years of age or older. For every 100 females there were 112.0 males, and for every 100 females age 18 and over there were 114.1 males age 18 and over.

The racial makeup of the county was 85.3% White, 5.5% Black or African American, 0.3% American Indian and Alaska Native, 0.7% Asian, <0.1% Native Hawaiian and Pacific Islander, 2.7% from some other race, and 5.5% from two or more races. Hispanic or Latino residents of any race comprised 6.8% of the population.

46.8% of residents lived in urban areas, while 53.2% lived in rural areas.

There were 13,589 households in the county, of which 26.9% had children under the age of 18 living in them. Of all households, 47.2% were married-couple households, 19.5% were households with a male householder and no spouse or partner present, and 25.1% were households with a female householder and no spouse or partner present. About 30.9% of all households were made up of individuals and 14.1% had someone living alone who was 65 years of age or older.

There were 14,985 housing units, of which 9.3% were vacant. Among occupied housing units, 72.9% were owner-occupied and 27.1% were renter-occupied. The homeowner vacancy rate was 2.2% and the rental vacancy rate was 9.6%.

=== Racial and ethnic composition ===
Lee County, Illinois – Racial and ethnic composition Note: the US Census treats Hispanic/Latino as an ethnic category. This table excludes Latinos from the racial categories and assigns them to a separate category. Hispanics/Latinos may be of any race.
Race / Ethnicity (NH = Non-Hispanic)	Pop 1980	Pop 1990	Pop 2000	Pop 2010	Pop 2020	% 1980	% 1990	% 2000	% 2010	% 2020
White alone (NH)	34,820	32,191	32,643	31,824	28,435	95.85%	93.60%	90.52%	88.32%	83.28%
Black or African American alone (NH)	580	1,212	1,753	1,709	1,831	1.60%	3.52%	4.86%	4.74%	5.36%
Native American or Alaska Native alone (NH)	38	71	32	51	30	0.10%	0.21%	0.09%	0.14%	0.09%
Asian alone (NH)	123	170	202	244	248	0.34%	0.49%	0.56%	0.68%	0.73%
Native Hawaiian or Pacific Islander alone (NH)	x	x	5	6	10	x	x	0.01%	0.02%	0.03%
Other race alone (NH)	168	21	11	25	95	0.46%	0.06%	0.03%	0.07%	0.28%
Mixed race or Multiracial (NH)	x	x	269	370	1,172	x	x	0.75%	1.03%	3.43%
Hispanic or Latino (any race)	599	727	1,147	1,802	2,324	1.65%	2.11%	3.18%	5.00%	6.81%
Total	36,328	34,392	36,062	36,031	34,145	100.00%	100.00%	100.00%	100.00%	100.00%

=== 2010 census ===
As of the 2010 United States census, there were 36,031 people, 13,758 households, and 9,064 families residing in the county. The population density was 49.7 inhabitants per square mile (19.2/km^{2}). There were 15,049 housing units at an average density of 20.8 per square mile (8.0/km^{2}). The racial makeup of the county was 90.9% white, 4.8% black or African American, 0.7% Asian, 0.2% American Indian, 1.9% from other races, and 1.5% from two or more races. Those of Hispanic or Latino origin made up 5.0% of the population. In terms of ancestry, 38.0% were German, 18.8% were Irish, 8.4% were English, and 8.2% were American.

Of the 13,758 households, 30.0% had children under the age of 18 living with them, 51.2% were married couples living together, 10.0% had a female householder with no husband present, 34.1% were non-families, and 28.8% of all households were made up of individuals. The average household size was 2.41 and the average family size was 2.94. The median age was 42.0 years.

The median income for a household in the county was $48,502 and the median income for a family was $60,759. Males had a median income of $42,114 versus $30,920 for females. The per capita income for the county was $24,440. About 7.6% of families and 9.6% of the population were below the poverty line, including 11.8% of those under age 18 and 6.5% of those age 65 or over.

== Communities ==
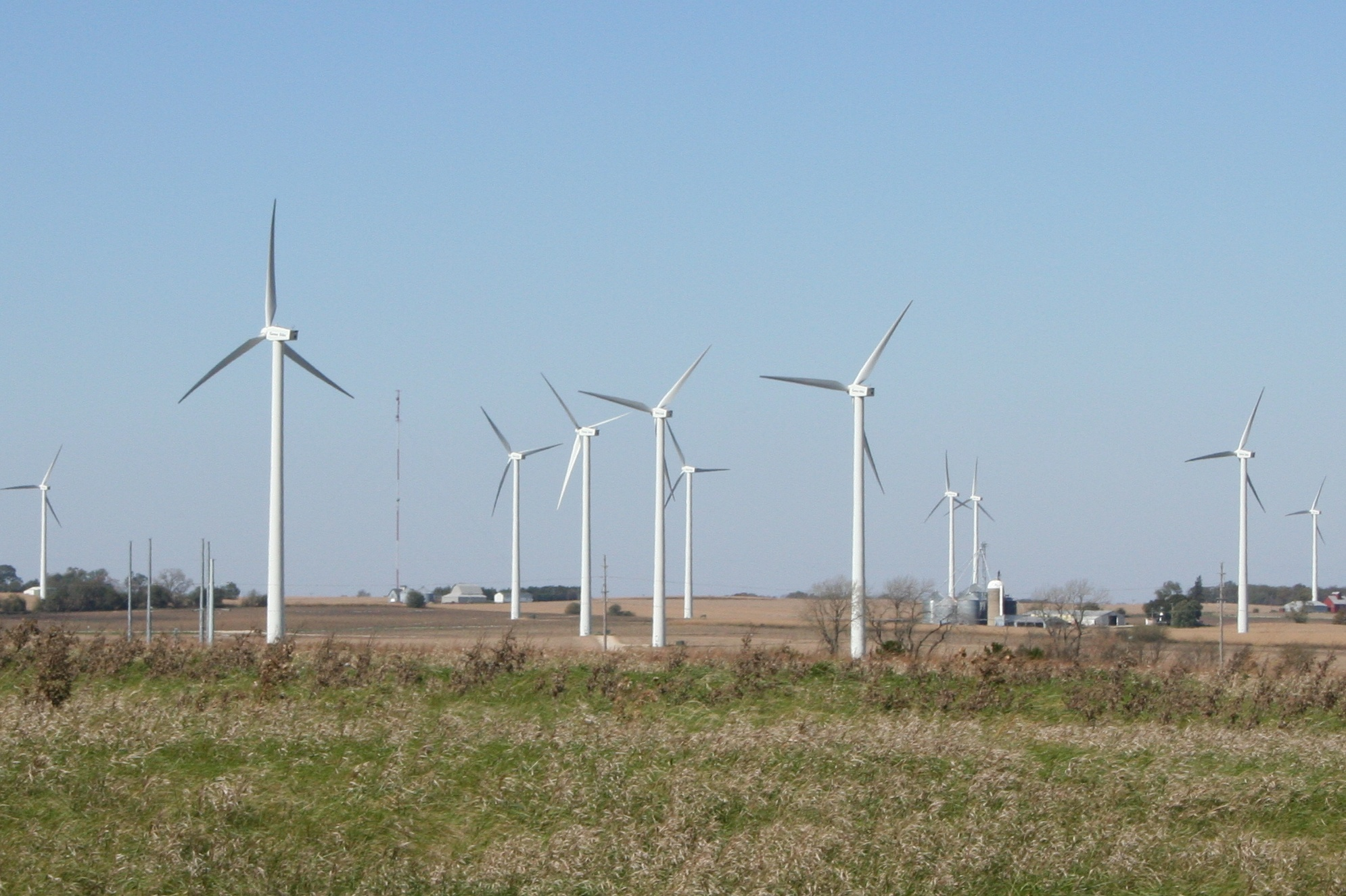
A wind farm in southeast Lee county at Interstate 39 exit 82.

=== Cities ===
- Amboy 2278
- Dixon (county seat) 15274
- Rochelle (mostly in Ogle County)

=== Villages ===
- Ashton
- Compton
- Franklin Grove
- Harmon
- Lee
- Nelson
- Paw Paw
- Steward
- Sublette
- West Brooklyn

=== Census-designated places ===
- Lee Center
- Nachusa

=== Unincorporated communities ===
- Binghampton
- The Burg

=== Townships ===
- Alto
- Amboy
- Ashton
- Bradford
- Brooklyn
- Dixon
- East Grove
- Franklin Grove
- Hamilton
- Harmon
- Lee Center
- Marion
- May
- Nachusa
- Nelson
- Palmyra
- Reynolds
- South Dixon
- Sublette
- Viola
- Willow Creek
- Wyoming

== Politics ==
Lee County is, together with neighboring Ogle County, the most consistently Republican county in Illinois. It is one of very few counties in the United States to have never supported a Democrat for President since the Civil War. The only occasion when the Republican candidate did not win the county in this time was in 1912, when Theodore Roosevelt carried it while running as a member of the Progressive Party, unofficially known as the "Bull Moose" party.

As of 2018, Lee County is in the 16th congressional district, the 45th legislative district, and the 74th and 90th representative districts.

United States presidential election results for Lee County, Illinois
Year	Republican		Democratic		Third party(ies)	
Year	No.	%	No.	%	No.	%
1892	3,513	54.24%	2,740	42.30%	224	3.46%
1896	4,797	64.78%	2,469	33.34%	139	1.88%
1900	4,820	63.55%	2,528	33.33%	237	3.12%
1904	4,634	69.77%	1,604	24.15%	404	6.08%
1908	4,255	63.50%	2,144	32.00%	302	4.51%
1912	1,482	23.03%	1,995	31.00%	2,959	45.98%
1916	7,985	63.95%	4,087	32.73%	414	3.32%
1920	7,615	78.94%	1,715	17.78%	316	3.28%
1924	8,363	69.36%	2,367	19.63%	1,327	11.01%
1928	9,238	67.14%	4,476	32.53%	46	0.33%
1932	7,802	51.46%	7,182	47.37%	177	1.17%
1936	8,914	54.92%	6,845	42.17%	473	2.91%
1940	11,228	64.96%	6,005	34.74%	52	0.30%
1944	10,397	67.88%	4,899	31.98%	21	0.14%
1948	9,001	66.97%	4,368	32.50%	72	0.54%
1952	11,941	71.71%	4,700	28.23%	10	0.06%
1956	11,653	71.98%	4,531	27.99%	5	0.03%
1960	10,835	64.73%	5,896	35.22%	8	0.05%
1964	8,445	53.59%	7,315	46.41%	0	0.00%
1968	9,598	62.92%	4,727	30.99%	930	6.10%
1972	10,636	68.67%	4,788	30.91%	65	0.42%
1976	8,674	57.54%	6,076	40.30%	326	2.16%
1980	11,373	73.67%	3,170	20.53%	895	5.80%
1984	11,178	73.76%	3,919	25.86%	58	0.38%
1988	8,903	65.48%	4,608	33.89%	85	0.63%
1992	6,652	43.15%	5,530	35.87%	3,235	20.98%
1996	6,677	47.08%	5,895	41.57%	1,610	11.35%
2000	8,069	55.19%	6,111	41.80%	440	3.01%
2004	9,307	58.62%	6,416	40.41%	153	0.96%
2008	8,258	50.49%	7,765	47.47%	334	2.04%
2012	8,059	52.51%	6,937	45.20%	352	2.29%
2016	8,612	55.60%	5,528	35.69%	1,349	8.71%
2020	9,630	58.58%	6,407	38.97%	403	2.45%
2024	9,680	59.86%	6,105	37.75%	387	2.39%

== Education ==
K-12 school districts include:

- Amboy Community Unit School District 272
- Ashton Community Unit School District 275
- Bureau Valley Community Unit School District 340
- Dixon Unit School District 170
- Earlville Community Unit School District 9
- Indian Creek Community Unit District 425
- La Moille Community Unit School District 303
- Lee Center Community Unit School District 271
- Polo Community Unit School District 222
- Sterling Community Unit District 5

Secondary school districts include:

- Mendota Township High School District 280
- Ohio Community High School District 505
- Rochelle Township High School District 212
- Rock Falls Township High School District 301

Elementary school districts include:

- Creston Community Consolidated School District 161
- East Coloma-Nelson Consolidated Elementary School District 20
- Mendota Community Consolidated School District 289
- Montmorency Community Consolidated School District 145
- Ohio Community Consolidated School District 17
- Rochelle Community Consolidated District 231
- Steward Elementary School District 220

== See also ==
- National Register of Historic Places listings in Lee County, Illinois
