= Galena and Chicago Union Railroad =

Former American railway company

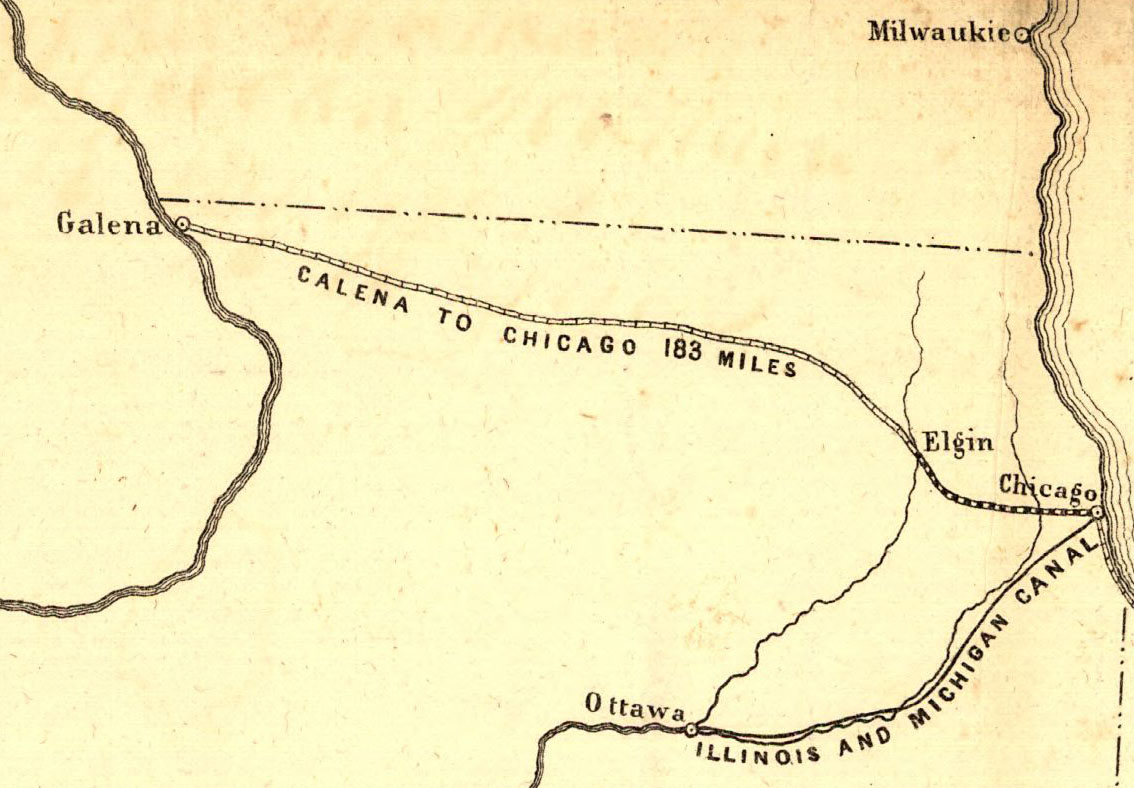
- Original plan from Chicago to Galena

Overview
- Locale: northern Illinois
- Dates of operation: 1836 (chartered); 1848 (in service)–1864
- Successor: Chicago and North Western

Technical
- Track gauge: 4 ft 8 1/2 in (1,435 mm) standard gauge

The Galena and Chicago Union Railroad (G&CU) was the first railroad constructed out of Chicago, intended to provide a shipping route between Chicago and the lead mines near Galena, Illinois. The railroad company was chartered on January 16, 1836, but financial difficulties delayed construction until 1848. While the main line never reached Galena, construction to Freeport, Illinois, allowed it to connect with the Illinois Central Railroad and provide direct service to Galena. A second line was built to Fulton, Illinois; eventually this route connected to railroads in Iowa and Nebraska, and became the eastern link to the first transcontinental railroad in the United States. The G&CU was also the original railroad of what became the Chicago & North Western railroad network.

== History ==
=== Contexts ===
After the Erie Canal was completed in 1825, immigrants flooded into the Midwest from the East. Chicago's location, at the southwestern end of Lake Michigan with a short, easy portage to rivers flowing south and west, made it a strategic point for white settlers moving through—as it had been for Native peoples before them. The white population in the region expanded exponentially, creating both markets and products that would need transportation.

One particular market that had Chicago leaders' attention was centered in Galena, Illinois, a town named for the most common form of lead sulphide. Long mined by Native peoples and French explorers, substantial lead deposits in Illinois, Wisconsin, and Iowa became known to settlers from the East in the early 1800s. St. Louis had a monopoly on shipping lead from Galena down the Mississippi River by steamboat to link to markets on the East Coast. But merchants and miners in Galena wanted a quicker, more direct route to Lake Michigan.

The Illinois and Michigan Canal was chartered on February 13, 1835, to provide a water route from Lake Michigan to the Illinois River and then to the Mississippi. However, work on the canal didn't officially begin until 1836, and various issues delayed construction, so the canal wasn't completed and operable until April 1848. Once completed, the canal did in fact carry significant amounts of cargo, as its successor the Chicago Sanitary and Ship Canal still does.

But merchants in Galena thought a railroad would provide lower costs to transport goods more directly to and from Chicago, then on to the East Coast. Historian Patrick E. McLear notes that boosters on the North Side of Chicago—including the railroad's future president, William Butler Ogden—also favored a railroad line coming into the city from the north, which they believed would help balance trade patterns that had so far favored areas south of the Chicago River.

And so the Galena and Chicago Union Railroad was chartered on January 16, 1836, initially capitalized at one thousand shares of $100 each, for a total of $100,000. The first stockholders' meeting took place on May 23, 1836, at which a board of directors was elected; on July 3, 1836, the board elected Theophilus W. Smith as president.

=== Looming financial failure ===
The G&CU was one of seventeen railroads incorporated in that legislative session, seven of which failed within two years. New railroad companies were risky ventures, because they had to spend huge amounts on construction, rolling stock, and storage and maintenance facilities before they could even begin to make money. While communities in the Midwest wanted railroads, the population simply wasn't great enough to fund and support railroad services. Knowing this, the G&CU's commissioners initially sought financing from investors in the East, and on August 4, 1836, they increased the amount of stock for sale to $500,000, aware that building a railroad would cost much more than $100,000.

However, the Panic of 1837 played havoc with fundraising of any sort. Few people had money to invest in a railroad, and several Directors of the company had to resign as they themselves were engulfed in financial problems. Though the Board did commission a survey of the route from downtown Chicago to the Des Plaines River, they could do nothing further.

Things seemed about to change when Elijah K. Hubbard got involved, purchasing an overwhelming majority of G&CU stock—79 percent, in fact; he also provided $30,000 for construction costs, so the railroad had funds to work with until late 1838. However, Hubbard died in May 1839 of tuberculosis, at which point it was revealed that he had been silently representing Elihu Townsend, an Eastern financier who was a director of the New York and Erie Railroad. To show Townsend that things were moving, William B. Ogden worked with developer Walter L. Newberry to plot a general route for the railroad to Galena, and several towns along the route held public meetings to demonstrate support for continuing construction. But Townsend was not convinced, offered no further support, and did nothing with his shares.

Everything came to a halt. Construction was not resumed. After their final meeting on November 22, 1837, the Directors of the Galena and Chicago Union Railroad did not meet for years. The G&CU was no longer a functioning company.

=== William B. Ogden and new life for the G&CU ===
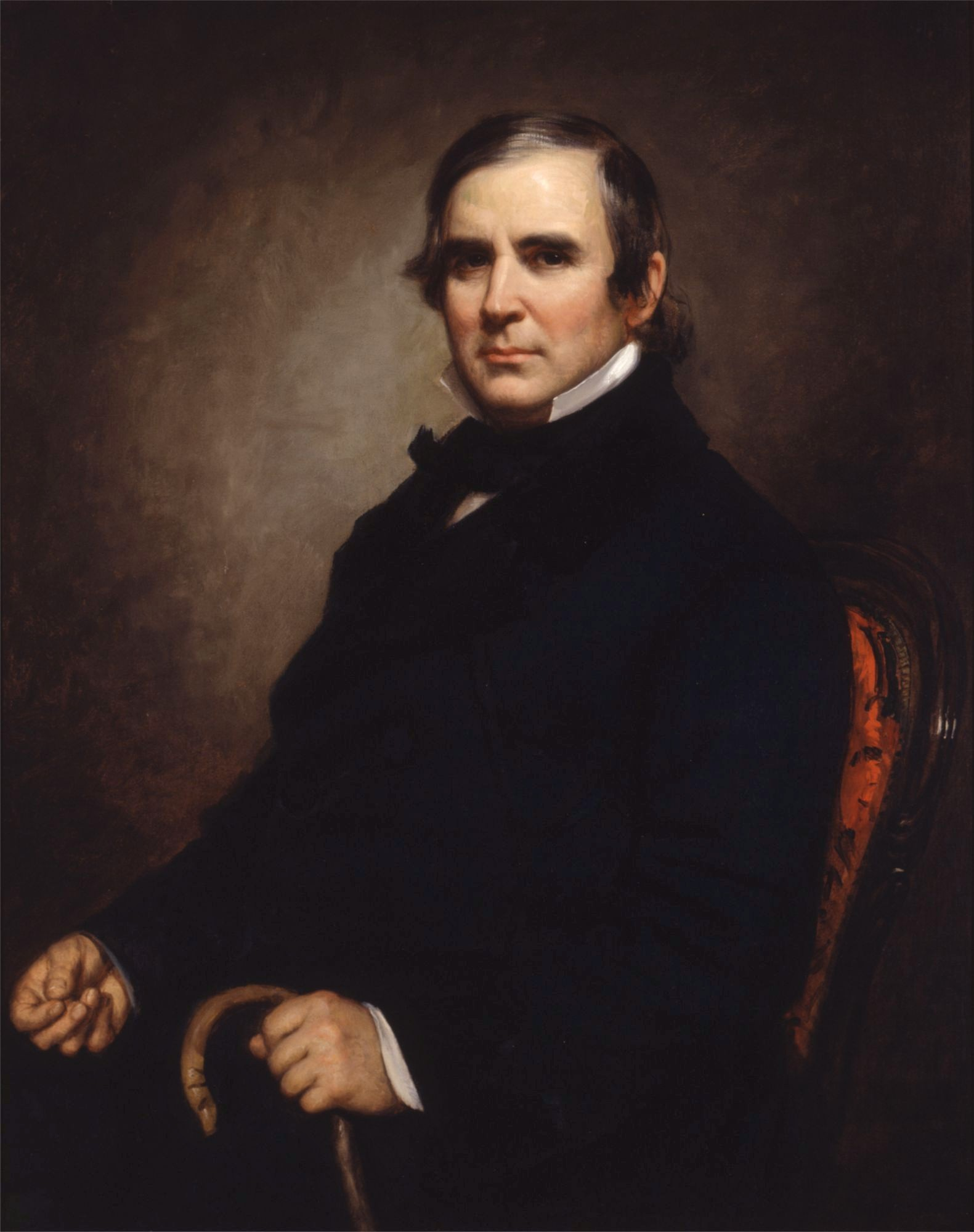
Portrait of William B. Ogden by G.P.A. Healy, 1855

William B. Ogden led the movement to reinvigorate the Galena and Chicago Union Railroad. When the G&CU was first chartered, Ogden had been in Chicago for less than a year, overseeing his wealthy brother-in-law's land investments north of the Chicago River. He had already worked to support railroad development as a young legislator in the state of New York, taking the lead in March 1835 to argue for state support of the New York and Erie Railroad. He asked fellow legislators to help build "continuous railways from New York to Lake Erie . . . through Ohio, Indiana, and Illinois, to the waters of the Mississippi," creating "the most splendid system of internal communication ever yet devised by man." The legislation passed, and his work was seen as a resounding success.

More interested in business than politics, however, two months later Ogden agreed to become the Chicago director of the American Land Company, arriving in May 1835. Although he himself was not wealthy, through his New York connections he had the trust of many rich investors. After two years in Chicago, Ogden was handling financial affairs for about a hundred Eastern investors, working with running totals, on average, of about $1 million of their funds. As his clients' profits grew, so did his own fortune. He was a savvy businessperson, well liked in Chicago, and he seems to have been a natural leader. In 1837 he was elected the first Mayor of Chicago, and in subsequent years he "was a leader in nearly every Chicago institution and investment enterprise in the 1840s and 1850s."

As he had been in New York, Ogden was particularly interested in building transportation networks. He invested in—and became president of—a steamboat company that operated for two years, linking Chicago with the western terminus of the Michigan Central Railroad at St. Joseph, Michigan. He and a partner got the contract to dig the Illinois and Michigan Canal, which they eventually completed a few years after the Panic of 1837 had calmed down. Although both ventures strained him financially, he successfully avoided bankruptcy, and when the economy settled down he focused on reviving the moribund Galena and Chicago Union Railroad.

As the years had gone on with no railroad service, frustrated mine operators in Wisconsin had begun to use wagon companies to transport lead to Madison and then on to Milwaukee. Newspapers in Milwaukee documented the exponentially increasing shipments of lead, taunting Chicagoans that this trade suggested "Milwaukee is destined to be the greatest town on Lake Michigan." As time went on, more towns in northwestern Illinois demanded action, to the point where supporters from Chicago realized that they might also lose the Galena market to the Madison-Milwaukee wagon companies.

Ogden and his associates began planning. In 1845, a group of businessmen from Galena, Rockford, and Chicago met in Rockford to organize a convention of interested parties from along the G&CU route. The convention began in Rockford on January 7, 1846 and was attended by Charles S. Hempstead who had just finished his term as Galena's first mayor. According to D. W. Yungmeyer, "the Chicago group was so well organized that it practically took over all the official chairs, committee heads, and about everything else, and because of its readiness with resolutions, statistics, and so on, secured the whole-hearted consent and approval of .–. everything [they] proposed." Delegates voted to create an organization that would take on the task of resurrecting the Galena and Chicago Union, appointing a committee which included eight Chicago representatives as well as former Galena mayor Hempstead.

William Ogden did not attend because he was in New York meeting with Elihu Townsend. With Ogden's eastern connections and his support of the New York and Erie Railroad—of which Townsend was a director—Ogden was in a good position to negotiate with Townsend. According to the original 1836 charter, if the G&CU company did not build a railroad within ten years, it would be disbanded as a corporation, and Townsend would lose everything he had invested. An amendment to the charter in 1837 had extended the construction deadline by five years, so they were still within the 15-year construction period, but it wasn't clear that Townsend planned to do anything on his own. If he were to let the new, still unofficial, group take over, Townsend could expect a profit if they were successful. Ogden set up the outlines of a deal in which Townsend would relinquish corporate control of the G&CU in exchange for the promise of substantial amounts of stock in what would essentially be a new company governed by the same charter.

When Ogden returned from New York with the promise of control over the Galena and Chicago Union Railroad Company, the new board of directors elected him as company president, on February 17, 1846. With the new organization, the deal with Townsend was completed in December 1846. A year after the first directors' meeting, on February 24, 1847, the Illinois legislature amended the railroad's charter to fit the new circumstances, setting the company's capital at $3 million. The Galena and Chicago Union was back in business.

== Construction ==
=== Building capital ===
Though newly reorganized, the G&CU company still needed cash to begin building. In 1847, Richard Morgan, their civil engineer, estimated construction costs of a single-track line from Chicago to Galena at approximately $2.65 million, or $14,553 for each mile. The directors took a two-pronged approach to get this funded: they urged local farmers and townspeople to buy small amounts of stock in the railroad, and they sought other wealthy investors in the East. Neither approach worked well: local stock purchases were disappointing, and the Eastern financiers were dismissive, even rude. Shipping magnate William F. Weld told the G&CU representatives, "When it breaks down as it surely will ... come and give it to us, and we will take hold of it and complete it."

Ogden and the Directors adjusted their strategy in two ways. They decided to begin construction as they gained funding, even if they didn't yet have money to build the whole route, and they intensified their efforts to sell stock in Illinois. One approach was to target farmers: as Morgan had written in his construction report, "a farmer near Rock River expends as much [money] getting his wheat to market as all other expenses of ploughing, sowing, harvesting and threshing," adding that the railroad would reduce their costs by $150 annually. Ogden in particular traveled the length of the planned route, trying to sell stock to farmers, businessmen, and miners in both Illinois and Wisconsin; he emphasized that downpayment on a $100 share would only cost $2.50, and that investors could make partial payments over time to complete the purchase. Two other company directors, J. Young Scammon and Walter Newberry, approached tired farmers who had just driven their harvest loads into Chicago, pointing out that a railroad would save them that work.

By the time of the first annual meeting of the new G&CU's stockholders, on April 5, 1848, slightly over $350,000 worth of stock had been sold, but downpayments on the stock amounted only to $20,817. Still, the board decided this was enough to pay for construction of the first segment from Chicago to Elgin. It helped that the terrain was flat, making construction simpler and cheaper. New chief engineer John Van Nortwick planned to save money by using strap-iron rails—wooden rails topped by 3/4-inch-thick iron strips—which were commonly used among early railroads. That spring, Ogden and fellow director Raymond Turner went east to buy construction materials and rolling stock, including locomotives, cars, and iron for the tracks. Although they had to use stock instead of cash for some of these purchases, they could get what they needed.

Construction began that summer, 1848, with the first four miles of track laid in October and November, reaching what is now Oak Park. To show off the new railroad's potential, the company held a celebratory first trip from Kinzie Street to Oak Park for stockholders and journalists, which raised people's excitement. Construction was completed to Elgin on January 22, 1850, but even before then the railroad had been hauling freight and passengers for profit. In its first year of official operation, the Galena and Chicago Union earned over $45,000, proving its feasibility. Its success encouraged stockholders and investors, so that funding was never again a problem. On February 26, 1850, the company paid its first dividend to stockholders, an increase of ten percent paid in further stock.

=== Building the G&CU ===
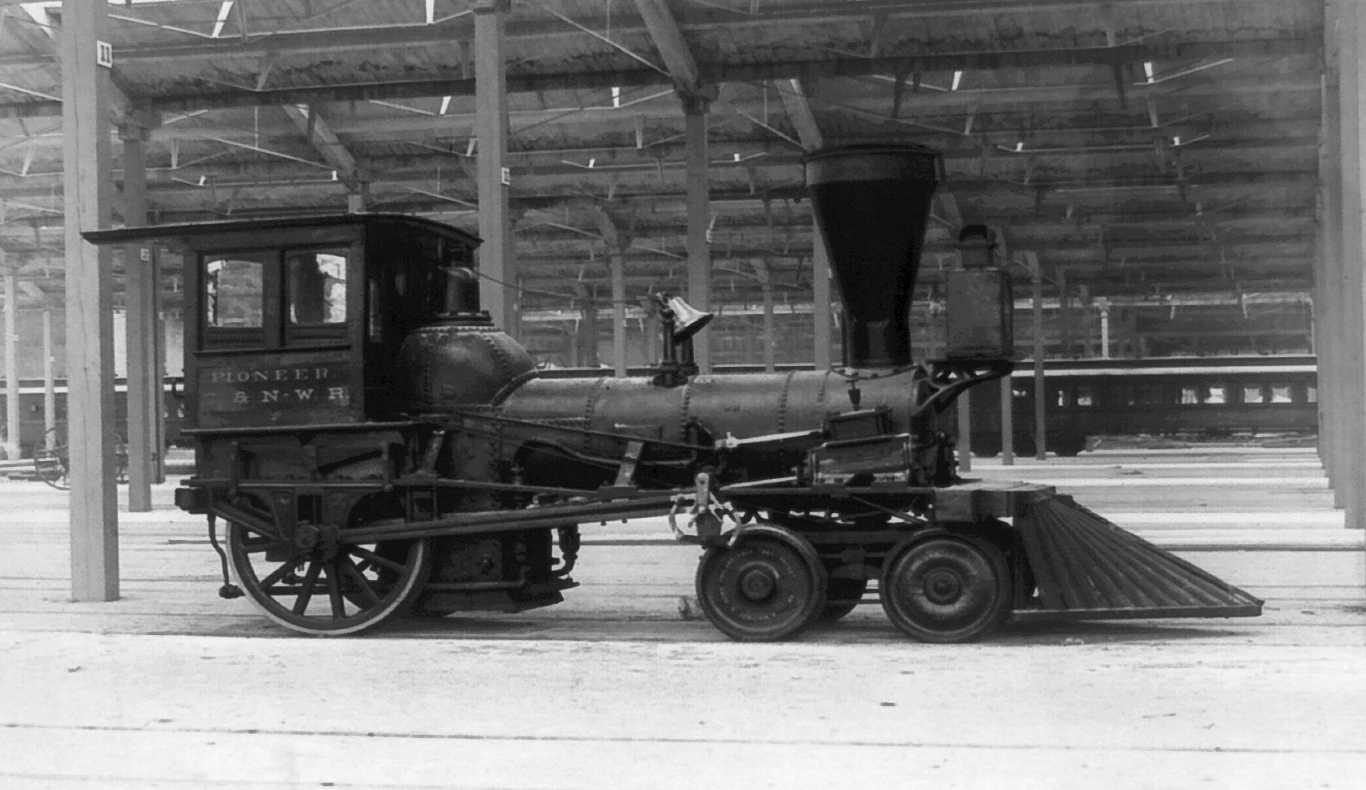
The Pioneer ca. 1898

To support their construction work, the G&CU used the same locomotive that had pulled the celebratory train, an 11-year-old engine purchased in 1848 from the Michigan Central Railroad. A 4-2-0 Baldwin locomotive, it was refurbished and given the new name of Pioneer. This little engine, the first to operate in Chicago, was to become a symbol of the company, and later the Chicago and North Western Railway, carrying construction materials back and forth as well as passengers and freight. For a time it was leased to the recently completed Aurora Branch Railroad, which had a close working relationship with the G&CU, but the Pioneer stayed in the G&CU's fleet for years and was used extensively to support further construction of the line westward.

In 1849 the company ordered a new engine with four driving wheels from Norris Brothers in Philadelphia, and they planned to order another similar locomotive. Their inventory included 25 freight cars of various types, with more on the way. That year the G&CU also built a freight station in Chicago, where they located the company's administrative headquarters, as well as two repair shops and an engine house. They had built a wharf on the Chicago River's north branch, but they had to make the river's channel wider before they could use it. Other facilities had been constructed at West Chicago and Elgin.

Tracks were completed from Chicago to Elgin on January 22, 1850. Construction reached Cherry Valley on March 10, 1852, and the stretch to Rockford was completed on August 10, 1852. By that point the board had also decided to replace the strap-iron rails first used on the earlier segments with better-quality "T-shaped" steel rails, even though the strap-iron had only been in place for two years. The road from Elgin westwards had been laid with the "T" rails, despite the added cost of $130,000, because they were safer and longer-lasting, and the company wanted to ensure the quality of rails along the whole route.

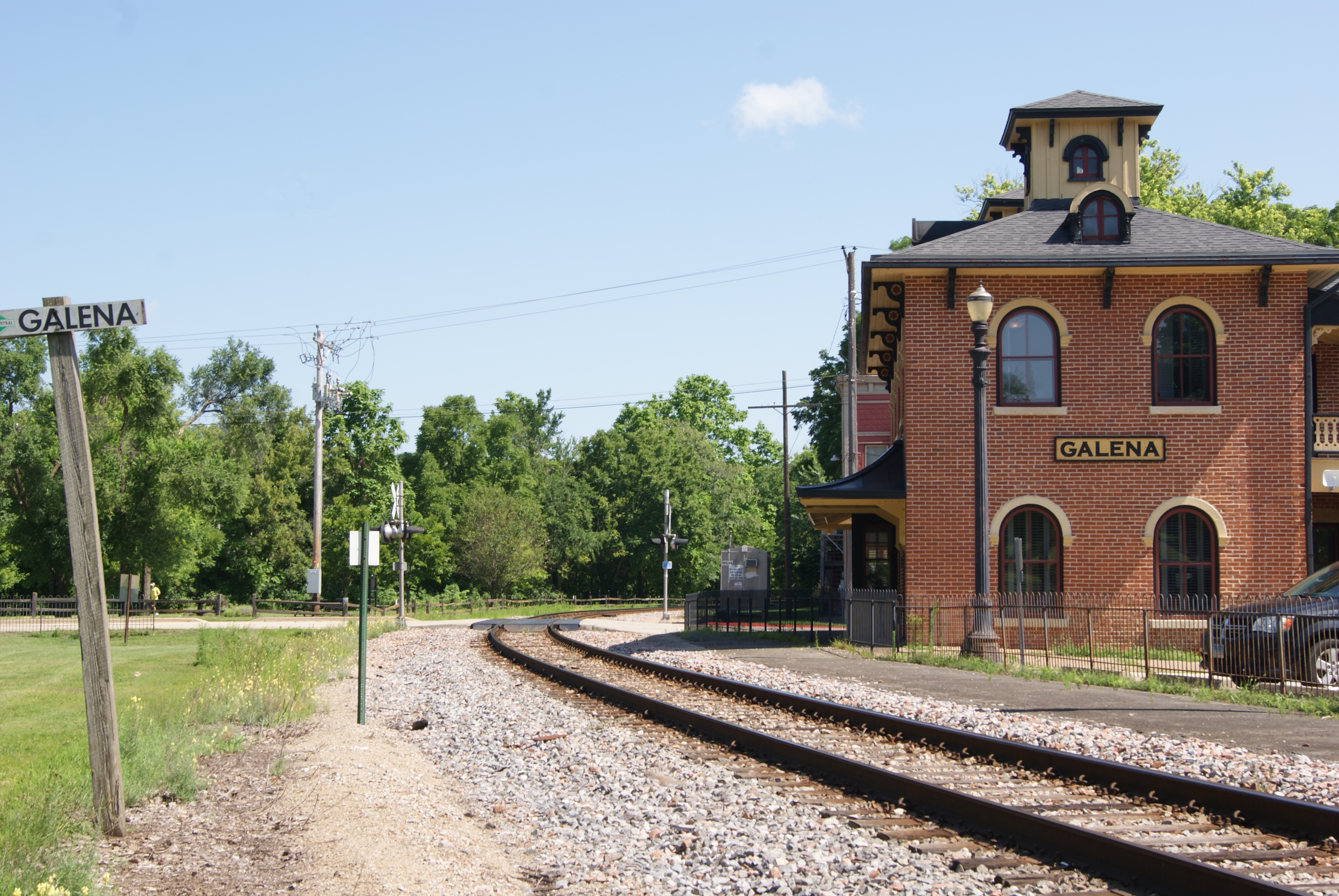
The Illinois Central train station in Galena, Illinois; originally built in 1857, it is now used as the Galena Country Visitors Center.

In May 1849, the Directors issued a resolution reaffirming that their western terminus would be Galena. However, in 1851 the board learned that there were just two viable routes through western Illinois's hilly terrain in to Galena, and the Illinois Central Railroad (IC) had priority to choose which one they would use. As a result, rather than build a redundant parallel line, the Board sought to link up with the IC at Freeport, which was on their own planned route approximately 50 miles east of Galena, and then to use the Illinois Central's tracks for the last stretch to Galena. An agreement with the Illinois Central to that effect was completed by May 1, 1852; the G&CU finished construction to Freeport on September 1, 1853. When the Illinois Central finished its tracks in to Galena in 1854, the Galena and Chicago Union Railroad had accomplished the goal identified in its company name. This agreement also benefited the Illinois Central, in that they would be allowed to use the G&CU's depot in Chicago.

=== Building a network ===
As construction proceeded on the Galena and Chicago Union, their railroad became the backbone for a network of lines feeding into Chicago. In some cases the G&CU helped create other railroads, and they built a few branch lines that would help those railroads connect to their network.

The first branch line connected to the G&CU was four miles long, built between the town of St. Charles to a point on the Galena tracks 33 miles from Chicago. Chartered by the Illinois legislature on January 1, 1849, the St. Charles Branch Railroad Company built its line in less than a year’s time, beginning business on December 11, 1849. Though hasty construction at first limited the track to horse-drawn cars, by March 1852 the G&CU regularly scheduled freight and passenger service connecting with the St. Charles Branch. And while John Van Nortwick commented dismissively that the G&CU’s business “is not enlarged by the construction of this branch,”, the St. Charles Railroad would later become invaluable to the G&CU’s future.

The Aurora Branch Railroad was chartered on February 12, 1849, to connect the villages of Batavia and Aurora to the Galena and Chicago Union. Starting at the 30-mile point of the G&CU, construction began early in 1850, reaching Batavia in August and then Aurora on October 21, 1850. The Aurora Branch had a close working relationship with the G&CU, leasing equipment from them as well as using the G&CU tracks into Chicago, and in 1851, John Van Nortwick reported that traffic from the villages and factories served by the Aurora Branch had increased the G&CU’s income by approximately 25%. The Aurora Branch’s directors, though, hoped to extend their line southwest to the Illinois River, a plan at first welcomed by the G&CU. However, the G&CU asserted its chartered priority rights to build any lateral branches, then leased the use of their right of way to the Aurora Branch in perpetuity. In 1852 the Aurora Branch Railroad changed its name to the Chicago and Aurora Railroad; their extension to Mendota was completed in 1853. The company’s name changed again in 1855, to become the Chicago, Burlington and Quincy Railroad which, as the “Burlington Route,” would expand and thrive for over a hundred years.

Already in 1847, when out selling G&CU stock, William Butler Ogden had traveled north to Janesville and Beloit in Wisconsin to gauge interest in a Wisconsin-based railroad that might connect with the G&CU at Rockford. The response was enthusiastic. In 1848 Ogden also promised private investors help in various forms to be given by the G&CU. As a result, two different railroad companies were incorporated on the same date, August 19, 1848: the Madison and Beloit Railroad planned to build north from Beloit to Madison, while the Beloit and Taycheedah hoped to link Beloit to Fond du Lac, Wisconsin. But the G&CU’s board did not immediately move as Ogden had promised, so these new companies merged in 1850 to create the Rock River Valley Union Railroad Company and went their own way, deciding to build from Madison to the Illinois state line near Sharon, Wisconsin, and Harvard, Illinois. Eventually they would be incorporated in to the Galena and Chicago Union’s successor, the Chicago and North Western Railway.

Later in 1850, the town of Beloit offered to buy $75,000 of G&CU stock to show continued support for a railroad line, and in 1851 the board “agreed conditionally” to build a branch to Beloit. John Van Nortwick had already surveyed routes to Beloit from different points on the G&CU’s line; eventually Belvidere, Illinois, was chosen as the connecting point, creating a more direct route from Beloit to Chicago. Meanwhile, the Beloit and Madison Rail Road Company was chartered by the Wisconsin Legislature on February 18, 1852; when it was formally organized, the Beloit and Madison’s board included three directors of the G&CU, and the G&CU’s president, John Bice Turner, was also named first president of the Beloit and Madison. By 1853 the G&CU had finished building the Beloit Branch, and on November 14, 1853, it began operations with the Beloit and Madison’s tracks, which were being built northward. The G&CU’s new Chief Engineer, John P. Ilsley, commented in 1855 that business from the Beloit and Madison could be “[compared] favorably with any portion of the main line” of the G&CU. When the Beloit and Madison had been completed to Footville, Wisconsin, the G&CU leased its tracks and was soon running two trains a day between Belvidere and Footville, eventually linking with other railroads north into the farmlands of central Wisconsin.

On June 18, 1852, the Fox River Valley Railroad was chartered to connect with the G&CU at Elgin, with plans to build north to the Illinois-Wisconsin state line and south to link up with the Aurora Branch Railroad at Batavia. The northern section, to be completed in 1854, would connect with one or two railroads in Wisconsin. Two of the Fox River’s original commissioners were affiliated with the G&CU, which entered into a business agreement with the Fox River and also built a 2-mile branch line in to Elgin to facilitate their connection to this “very valuable feeder” line. By 1858, however, the Fox River Valley was in trouble financially, and operations had been transferred to the bondholders—which included the G&CU, who also held over 20% of the Fox River’s stock. After being sold the previous day, the Fox River was reorganized on November 11, 1858, with railroad operations under the control of the G&CU. Profits went to the Fox River, which was still technically independent. On February 12, 1859, the Illinois legislature ratified the company’s sale and reincorporation as the Elgin and State Line Railroad Company, approving the G&CU's control.

=== Building to the Mississippi River ===
The Galena and Chicago Union’s first move towards its most important route was prompted by the tiny St. Charles Branch Railroad Company, whose directors had decided to build a line of their own from Chicago westwards. On February 3, 1853, their name was officially changed to the Chicago, St. Charles & Mississippi Air Line Railroad. The state legislature gave them permission to build tracks between Chicago and St. Charles, either independently or in partnership with the G&CU. More importantly, though, the newly reorganized company was also authorized to build westwards to the Mississippi River, to a point somewhere between Savanna and Albany, Illinois. They were further given permission to build north from Savanna to Galena, as well as being authorized to link with railroads in Iowa.

The Air Line’s plan represented a serious threat to the G&CU’s business, so the Galena and Chicago Union directors ordered Chief Engineer John Van Nortwick to survey a second line westwards from West Chicago, on a more southerly route than their original line to Galena. Their goal was to link up with the planned Rockford and Rock Island Railroad, which was incorporated in 1851 to build from Rockford southwest to Rock Island, on a route crossing the G&CU’s planned line. The G&CU would use the Rock Island tracks southwest to Dixon, Illinois, and then use tracks being built by the Mississippi and Rock River Junction Railroad; this company was also chartered in 1851, to build from the Illinois Central Railroad “by the way of Sterling” to “the Narrows of the Mississippi” at Fulton, Illinois. The G&CU brought their plan to the Illinois legislature, which gave its formal approval on February 25, 1854, granting them the right to build west as far as Dixon, Illinois, and then to contract with another company or build their own line to the town of Sterling, and from there to Albany or Fulton, on the Mississippi.

As it turned out, the Chicago, St. Charles, and Mississippi had made the fatal mistake of selling stock with the promise that subscribers would only have to pay 25 per cent of each of their shares per year; this strangled the flow of funds for construction, so only ten miles of track was built, from the Chicago River west to the Des Plaines River. The G&CU’s maneuvering also effectively prevented westward construction by the Chicago, St. Charles & Mississippi, so when the G&CU offered to pay $540,000 for their depot grounds in Chicago, and the ten miles of track which had been finished, the St. Charles directors “were glad to sell.” The G&CU’s purchase of the depot grounds would allow them to connect fairly easily to the shared Illinois Central and Michigan Central depot.

The Rockford and Rock Island Railroad also had financial troubles, and so nothing was ever built by them. In 1854 the G&CU stockholders approved extending construction all the way to Dixon, and they began calling the new line “the Dixon and Central Iowa Route.” In fact, on May 1, 1854, the G&CU had already completed and begun using 45 miles of that route. They had also negotiated a lease of the Mississippi and Rock River Junction tracks, stipulating that the Mississippi and Rock River would prepare the track bed from Dixon to Fulton, and the G&CU would “complete, stock, operate and manage it in perpetuity.” In 1854, John Van Nortwick reported that “the equipment of the road now consists of 30 Locomotive Engines, 34 Passenger and Baggage Cars, 307 House Freight [boxcars], 96 Platform Freight Cars and 132 Gravel and Hand Cars; 9 Locomotive Engines and about 125 Passenger and Freight Cars will be added to the above by September next.” By March of 1855, though, the G&CU had absorbed the Mississippi and Rock River Junction, and construction of the line from Dixon to Fulton was completed later that year, so that the Galena & Chicago Union was opened for traffic directly from Chicago to their new depot in Fulton on December 16, 1855.

== Looking at Iowa and the Missouri River ==
A number of railroads were building westward toward the Mississippi River. The Galena & Chicago Union Railroad was one of these working its way from Chicago to the Mississippi on the Fulton, Illinois side of the river opposite Clinton, Iowa. Recently the new town of Clinton had been renamed by the Iowa Land Co. from its original name of New York, a small village and ferry at a narrows on the river. The businessmen that created the town also created the Chicago Iowa & Nebraska railroad and to ensure they could demand the highest real estate prices, they also created the Albany Bridge Co. to connect Clinton with Fulton and Chicago across the river building a railroad bridge and steam ferry there.

The Iowa railroads at Clinton were the Chicago, Iowa & Nebraska (CI&N) and the Cedar Rapids & Missouri River (CR&MR). The CI&N began laying rail to Cedar Rapids in 1857 while the CR&MR was organized in 1859 to build the rest of the way to Council Bluffs. The CI&N bridge from Fulton to Little Rock Island on the Illinois side of the river included a steam ferry operation to get trains the rest of the way across the river. Now, except for a pending lawsuit by riverboat companies against railroad bridges obstructing navigation, they could begin building the rest of the bridge as well as more miles of Road.

Much of this was designed for gaining government land grants and charters and these companies had many of the same stockholders, including noted New York railroad promoters Dr. Thomas Clark Durant and John Insley Blair. Durant of the Union Pacific had recently committed to building a transcontinental railroad to the west coast from Omaha opposite Council Bluffs in Iowa. Blair's CR&MR planned to connect to Omaha via Council Bluffs. The Galena Directors saw the opportunity to connect with the First Transcontinental railroad if they could get control of the Iowa railroads at Clinton.

Three railroad engineer friends from Northfield Vt. were recruited to help out. Dr. Edward H. Williams became Supt. of the Galena and his friend John C. Gault of the Vermont Central was his assistant. Isaac B. Howe, Road Master and Engineer of the Vermont Central was recruited for the Iowa roads in Clinton. Major Charles Bodfish was the railroad Supt. in Clinton with Col. Milo Smith as his Chief Engineer. Previously Milo Smith had done engineering with the G&CU but since 1855 he had been alternately Supt. and Chief Engineer building the CI&N railroad from Clinton to Cedar Rapids plus beginning the Mississippi bridge. When IB Howe took over as Asst. Supt. and Engineer, Milo Smith stepped away to lead the 26th Iowa Infantry Regiment to war.

On the east side of the Mississippi the Galena & Chicago Union Railroad was preparing to expand across the Mississippi into Iowa. From there they had plans for crossing Iowa to Council Bluffs connecting with 'Doc' Durant's transcontinental railroad across the country. In order to accomplish this they would need to acquire the roads already built, and by an interesting coincidence Dr. Williams and Gault were already running the Galena railroad and Howe was by now running both Iowa lines in Clinton. On 23Jun1861 Howe wrote:

"I shall not be surprised if the Road is leased to Galena & Chicago Union RR as they want it & need it very much."

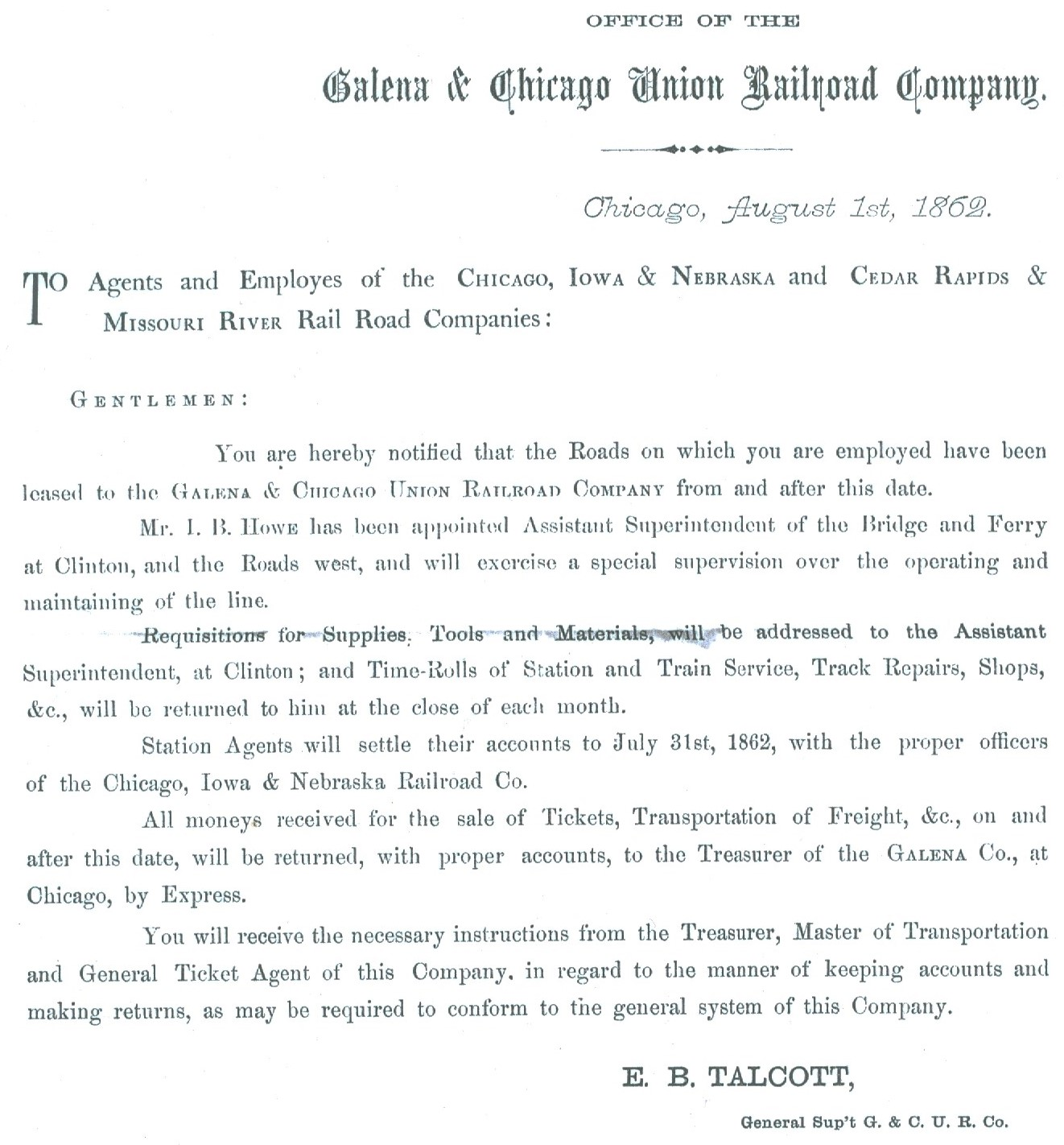
IB Howe appointed AsstSupt. in charge of the leased CI&N and CR&MR railroads 1Aug1862. Courtesy Chicago & North Western Historical Society archives.

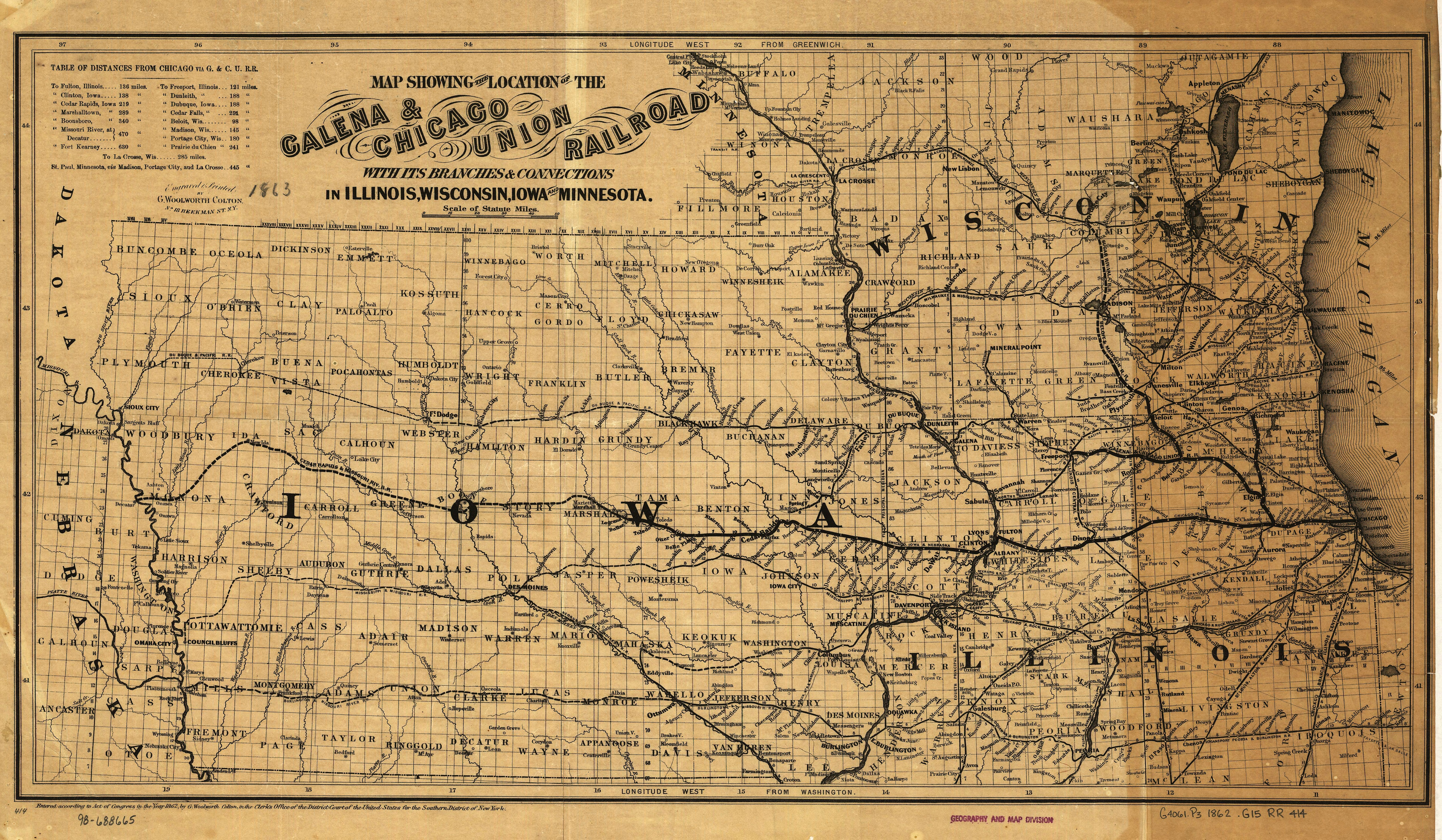
1862 map of the Galena and Chicago Union Railroad's location and routes

The following year the Galena notified the CI&N. and CR&MR railroads that they were being leased to the Galena by official published proclamation. By the end of 1862 a letter was published to other railroads by I.B. Howe, now Superintendent of the Iowa railroads in Clinton:

   "Dear Sir: Please send Annual Passes for 1863, for
   John Bertram, President Horace Williams, General Agent C I & N RR
   L.B. Crocker, President W.W. Walker, Chief Eng'r
   I.B. Howe, Sup't CR & MR RR
   The Roads above-named now form a part of the Galena & Chicago Union Railroad Line, and the Passes you will receive from that company will be good over these roads.
   Respectfully Yours, I.B. Howe, Sup't

Other than the fact that WW Walker was Blair's civil engineer and Blair was a Director, the Galena had control of the Clinton Iowa railroads with Howe, Gault and Williams running the show. But the "war of the rebellion" slowed progress as resources were being devoted to the war effort. It was pretty obvious to the nation that the Roads would be in a race across the country were it not for the war. The Iowa Roads were already to Marshalltown by March 1863 and continuing to build further west. The 1862 map by G. Woolworth Colton shown here lays out the various lines in operation at that time.

Building railroads was a lucrative business where government would grant vast tracts of land to incentivize railroads because where the roads went so went prosperity. But it became complicated when charters went to a road that went bankrupt or bought out another reducing competition, or increasing competition if it wasn't well planned. The lease of the Iowa railroads to the Galena company was a stellar example of increasing efficiency, but consolidation so far was only a temporary fix.

== The 1864 Great Consolidation of the Chicago & NorthWestern Railway ==
As Howe's Iowa roads continued to slowly build westward, the war came to an end. In June 1864 a massive change took place. A previously insignificant Chicago & Northwestern railroad purchased the whole enterprise making it one organization with multiple divisions. This was called The Great Consolidation and the Galena & Chicago Union name disappeared in history. IB Howe became the Supt. of the Iowa Division which included everything from Clinton to the town of Nevada at that time. The Illinois side of the river became the Galena Division with Dr. Williams as Supt. and Gault as his assistant. George L Dunlap, formerly Asst. Supt. of the Chicago, St Anthony & Fond du Lac RR, was now the Gen. Supt. for the entire consolidated railroad. The Nevada railhead was already west of Marshalltown, but by the end of the year they would have pushed the Road past Ames to Boone. The race to Council Bluffs on the Missouri River was on.

[Printed Circular– Organization of the Great Consolidation of the C&NW and Galena RRs] Chicago & North Western Railway, General Superintendent's Office, Chicago, June 10, 1864. General Circular.

   "In pursuant to the General Notice issued by the President, bearing even date herewith, I hereby assume general superintendence of the several lines now forming the CHICAGO AND NORTH-WESTERN RAILWAY.
   The Railway will hereafter be divided into and operated as Four Divisions, designated as follows:
   That portion between Chicago and Fulton, and Chicago and Freeport, including the Fox River Valley and Beloit and Madison Line, will form and be known as the Galena Division.
   That portion between Clinton and Nevada (Io.), will form the Iowa Division.
   That portion between Chicago and Fort Howard will form the Wisconsin Division.
   That portion between Kenosha and Rockford will form the Kenosha Division. The following Officers have been appointed:
   EH Williams to be Superintendent and JC Gault Assistant Superintendent of the Galena Division.
   IB Howe Superintendent of the Iowa Division.
   TF Strong and AA Hobart, Assistant Superintendents of Wisconsin Division.
   CH Spofford Superintendent of Kenosha Division.
   Chas. S Tappan – General Freight Agent.
   Edw. P Cutter, – Acting General Ticket Agent.
   Benj. F Patrick, – General Passenger Agent.
   All Rules and Regulations, either Special or General, heretofore in effect upon the Galena or Iowa Divisions will be observed until changed or countermanded from this office.
   Geo. L Dunlap, General Superintendent."

This new consolidated railroad completed a connection without transfer from Chicago to Council Bluffs and Omaha in early 1867.

This was the first railroad to reach Council Bluffs, Iowa and connect with the First transcontinental railroad which was being constructed westward by the Union Pacific Railroad in Omaha, Nebraska.

The C&NW merged with the Union Pacific Railroad over a century later in 1996.

Today, the G&CU's main line between Chicago and West Chicago is a busy commuter service, jointly operated by Union Pacific and Metra as the Union Pacific West Line. The remainder of the line from West Chicago to Rockford is still in service carrying only freight (though Amtrak service to Rockford has been proposed and planned) with local industrial spurs in Rockford and Loves Park. The route between Rockford and Freeport is abandoned, and is being converted into a rail trail.

== Depots ==
Stations between Chicago and Freeport included the following:

- Chicago, Illinois (1848. Depot at Kinzie and Canal Streets north of the Chicago River was converted to an employees' reading room in 1853. Second depot at Kinzie and Wells Streets burned in 1871. The Merchandise Mart now occupies the site)
- Garfield Park (1848. formerly Central Park)
- Oak Park, Illinois (1848. formerly Oak Ridge, Cicero)
- Melrose Park, Illinois (1849) formerly Melrose
- Berkeley, Illinois (1849. Formerly Proviso)
- Elmhurst, Illinois (1849. Formerly Cottage Hill)
- Lombard, Illinois (1849. Babcock's Grove)
- Glen Ellyn, Illinois (1849. Formerly Danby)
- Wheaton, Illinois (1849)
- Winfield, Illinois (1849–1854. Hedges Station)
- West Chicago, Illinois (1849. Turner Junction. Hotel and roundhouse 1853)
- Wayne, Illinois (1850)
- South Elgin, Illinois (1850. formerly Clintonville)
- Elgin, Illinois (1850)
- Gilberts, Illinois (1855. Gilbert's Station)
- Huntley, Illinois (1851)
- Union, Illinois (1851)
- Marengo, Illinois (1851. Depot moved to Illinois Railway Museum and renamed East Union)
- Garden Prairie, Illinois (1853)
- Belvidere, Illinois (1851)
- Cherry Valley, Illinois (1853)
- Rockford, Illinois (1851)
- Winnebago, Illinois (1853)
- Pecatonica, Illinois (1853)
- Nevada, Ridott Township, Stephenson County, Illinois (1853. Depot was moved to Ridott 10 July 1860. Nevada no longer exists)
- Ridott, Illinois (1860)
- Freeport, Illinois (1853)

From West Chicago to Clinton:

- La Fox, Illinois (1859)
- Elburn, Illinois (1854, formerly Blackberry)
- Maple Park, Illinois (1854, formerly Lodi)
- Cortland, Illinois (1854)
- DeKalb, Illinois (1854)
- Malta, Illinois (1855, formerly Milton)
- Creston, Illinois (1855, Formerly Dement)
- Rochelle, Illinois (1855, formerly Hang Town)
- Flagg, Illinois(1856)
- Ashton, Illinois (1855, formerly Ogle)
- Franklin Grove, Illinois (1855)
- Nachusa, Illinois (1855)
- Dixon, Illinois (1855)
- Nelson, Illinois (1858)
- Sterling, Illinois (1855)
- Galt, Illinois (1857)
- Agnew, Illinois (1860)
- Como, Illinois (1855. Depot was moved to Agnew in 1860)
- Round Grove, Illinois (1855)
- Lyndon, Illinois (1857)
- Morrison, Illinois (1855)
- Union Grove, Illinois (1859)
- Fulton, Illinois (1855. Line was moved to East Clinton after C&NW takeover)
- Clinton, Iowa (1855)

Crystal Lake Branch

- East Dundee, Illinois (1854)
- Algonquin, Illinois (1855)
- Crystal Lake, Illinois (1855)

Aurora Branch

- Batavia, Illinois (1872)
- Aurora, Illinois (1888)

St. Charles Branch

- Geneva, Illinois (1854)
- St. Charles, Illinois (1871)

== Sources ==
- Cronon, William (1992). Nature's metropolis: Chicago and the great west (reprint ed.). W. W. Norton & Company. ISBN 0-393-30873-1. examines the economic effects of the railroad (among other things).
- An Act to Incorporate the Galena and Chicago Union Rail Road Company, January 16, 1836. In Laws of the State of Illinois Passed by the Ninth General Assembly, at Their Second Session, Commencing December 7, 1835, and ending January 18, 1836, J. Y. Sawyer, Public Printer, 1836. pp. 24–30.
- Chicago and Northwestern Railroad Company, Yesterday and Today: A History of the Chicago and Northwestern Railroad Company, 3rd ed. Winship Co., 1910. – via Internet Archive.
- A Chronological History of Chicago: 1673– Compiled by Chicago Municipal Reference Library, City of Chicago, updated by Municipal Reference Collection, Chicago Public Library.
- Downard, William L. JSTOR 40191527 "William Butler Ogden and the Growth of Chicago"], Journal of the Illinois State Historical Society, Vol. 75, No. 1 (Spring 1982), pp. 47–60.
- Fisher, Chas. E. JSTOR 43516964 "Galena and Chicago Union Railroad Company," The Railway and Locomotive Historical Society Bulletin, March 1932, pp. 5–28.
- McLear, Patrick E. JSTOR 40191560 "The Galena and Chicago Union Railroad: A Symbol of Chicago's Economic Maturity"], Journal of the Illinois State Historical Society, Vol. 73, No. 1 (Spring 1980), pp. 17–26.
- McLear, Patrick E. JSTOR 40191244 "William Butler Ogden: A Chicago Promoter in the Speculative Era and the Panic of 1837"], Journal of the Illinois State Historical Society, Vol. 70, No. 4 (November 1977), pp. 283–291.
- The Northern Counties Gazetteer and Directory for 1855–6: A Complete and Perfect Guide to Northern Illinois Containing a Concise Description of the Cities, Towns & Principal Villages... (1855). 189 Lake Street, Chicago. Reprinted on demand by Pranava Books, India. August 2019.
- Yungmeyer, D. W. JSTOR 43519951 "Selected Items From the Minute Book of the Galena and Chicago Railroad Company With a Foreword and Comment"], The Railway and Locomotive Historical Society Bulletin, October 1944, No. 65. pp. 27–42.
