= Virgil Ferguson =

American politician

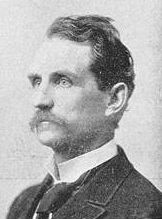
Ferguson in 1893.

Virgil Stuart Ferguson (1844–1912) was an Illinois attorney and Republican politician. He represented Whiteside County in the Illinois State Senate from 1891 to 1895, serving in the 37th and 38th sessions of the General Assembly. He lived for most of his life in Sterling, Illinois.

== Early life and education ==
Virgil Stuart Ferguson was born to Andrew and Zerelda Brock Ferguson on September 18, 1844, in Bedford, Indiana. He was the eldest of eight children. He attended the Mount Carroll Seminary, known today as Shimer College, in the early 1860s, while his family was living in Milledgeville, Illinois. Prior to attending the Seminary, Ferguson had attended the Hazel Green School near Milledgeville, for which he helped to organize a large reunion in 1897.

After completing his studies at the Seminary, Ferguson attended the University of Chicago for a time. He joined the Illinois bar on June 23, 1868, following his graduation from Union College of Law, which later became the Northwestern University School of Law. Also in 1868, he married Annie E. Mickle; they had two children.

== Political career ==
Ferguson was elected Assistant Supervisor of Sterling Township in 1888, without opposition. He resigned upon being elected to the state senate in 1890. He also served for at least eighteen years on the school board for the Wallace School, now the Wallace Educational Center, in Sterling.

Ferguson was elected in 1890 to a four-year term in the Illinois State Senate, representing the counties of Lee and Whiteside. In 1891, Ferguson was one of two state senators to oppose a bill that required the weekly payment of wages, considering it unconstitutional. The law was subsequently overturned by the Illinois Supreme Court in Bracewell Coal v. People, 147 Ill. 66, for interfering in freedom of contract.

In 1893, Ferguson sponsored legislation to reform Illinois law on the restraint and detention of the insane, replacing an 1874 law that had required a public jury trial for all such cases.

After leaving the General Assembly in 1895, Ferguson returned to private practice in Sterling.

Ferguson was struck and killed by a train while visiting in Rockford, Illinois, on September 23, 1912. A coroner's inquiry found the train to have been speeding. He was laid to rest in Sterling's Riverside Cemetery.
