= Union Grove =

Union Grove may refer to several places in the United States:

- Union Grove, Alabama
- Union Grove, Illinois
- Union Grove Township, Whiteside County, Illinois
- Union Grove Township, Iredell County, North Carolina
- Union Grove, Texas
- Union Grove, Wisconsin
- Union Grove Township, Meeker County, Minnesota
