= Deer Grove, Illinois =

Deer Grove
- Village
- Location of Deer Grove in Whiteside County, Illinois.
- Coordinates: 41°36′35″N 89°41′12″W
- Country: United States
- State: Illinois
- County: Whiteside

Area
  - Total: 0.41 sq mi (1.07 km^{2})
  - Land: 0.41 sq mi (1.07 km^{2})
  - Water: 0 sq mi (0.00 km^{2})
- Elevation: 646 ft (197 m)

Population (2020)
  - Total: 38
  - Density: 92.4/sq mi (35.68/km^{2})
- Time zone: UTC-6 (CST)
  - Summer (DST): UTC-5 (CDT)
- ZIP code: 61243
- Area code: 815
- FIPS code: 17-19031
- GNIS feature ID: 2398703

Deer Grove is a village in Whiteside County, Illinois, United States. The population was given as 38 in the 2020 census, down from 48 in 2010.

== History ==
A man named William Renner and his family are believed to have been the first to settle in the area later known as Hahnaman Township, arriving from Pennsylvania in 1841. A post office was established in 1873. Many small schools served the area before they were all ultimately closed by the 1950s. The earliest of them, known as the Advance School, was located at the intersection of IL-40 and Bell Rd.

Deer Grove was incorporated as a village in 1937.

== Geography ==
According to the 2010 census, Deer Grove has a total area of 0.46 square miles (1.19 km^{2}), all land.

== Demographics ==
Historical population
Census	Pop.	Note	%±
1940	98		—
1950	72		−26.5%
1960	86		19.4%
1970	66		−23.3%
1980	77		16.7%
1990	44		−42.9%
2000	48		9.1%
2010	48		0.0%
2020	38		−20.8%
U.S. Decennial Census

As of the census of 2000, there were 48 people, 21 households, and 12 families residing in the village. The population density was 105.3 inhabitants per square mile (40.7/km^{2}). There were 22 housing units at an average density of 48.3 per square mile (18.6/km^{2}). The racial makeup of the village was 91.67% White, 2.08% African American, 6.25% from other races. Hispanic or Latino of any race were 8.33% of the population.

There were 21 households, out of which 28.6% had children under the age of 18 living with them, 52.4% were married couples living together, 4.8% had a female householder with no husband present, and 38.1% were non-families. 33.3% of all households were made up of individuals, and 23.8% had someone living alone who was 65 years of age or older. The average household size was 2.29 and the average family size was 2.92.

In the village, the population was spread out, with 22.9% under the age of 18, 6.3% from 18 to 24, 25.0% from 25 to 44, 22.9% from 45 to 64, and 22.9% who were 65 years of age or older. The median age was 40 years. For every 100 females, there were 71.4 males. For every 100 females age 18 and over, there were 76.2 males.

The median income for a household in the village was $44,167, and the median income for a family was $43,750. Males had a median income of $32,500 versus $26,250 for females. The per capita income for the village was $16,651. There were no families and 5.7% of the population living below the poverty line, including no under eighteens and none of those over 64.

== Education ==
It is in the Prophetstown-Lyndon-Tampico Community Unit School District 3.
