= Whiteside County Courthouse =

Local government building in the United States

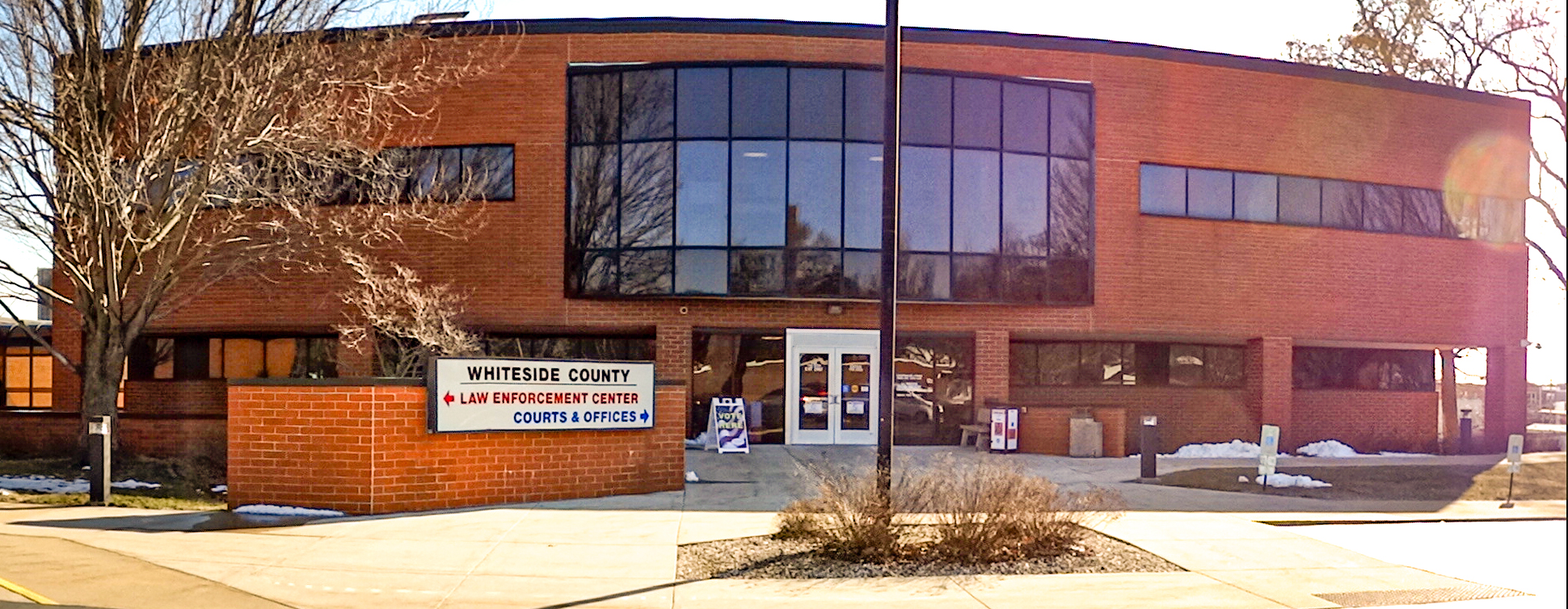
- View of entrance to the courthouse

General information
- Location: 200 E Knox St, Morrison, Illinois
- Coordinates: 41°48′37″N 89°57′50″W
- Opened: 1987

The Whiteside County Courthouse is a government building in Morrison, the county seat of Whiteside County, Illinois, United States. Completed in 1987 to replace a 19th-century predecessor, it is the fourth courthouse, in the third community, to serve Whiteside County officials since the county's formation.

== History ==
Growing settlement in northwestern Illinois prompted the legislature to establish Peoria County in 1825 and to separate its northwestern portions as Jo Daviess County two years later. Out of this county's southern portions was formed Whiteside County in 1836, although it temporarily remained attached to the parent county, and full organization required a number of years to complete; not until 1852 could the county be divided into townships, for example. By this time, the area was well settled, the first pioneers having arrived more than twenty years prior, and as early as 1858, there was an old-settlers' association in operation.

County voters met to choose a county seat in 1839, selecting Lyndon, but Sterling residents were dissatisfied with this choice; the county commissioners allowed a second vote at which the upstart supplanted Lyndon, and the seat was moved in 1841. Nevertheless, the contest continued: county residents pressured legislators in Springfield, who over the next four years enacted three separate laws seeking to resolve the question: a commission was appointed to ascertain the best location in 1843, a Lyndon lawsuit seeking to retrieve the seat status was quashed by an 1846 law naming Sterling the seat, and an 1849 act ordered another election whose decision was to be final. Sterling being the victor of this election, Lyndon finally ceased to contend, but in 1857, the residents of Morrison urged the passage of another law to permit yet another election, and their victory in this vote caused the seat to move in 1858.

== Previous courthouses ==
Whiteside County's first courthouse was a simple building constructed on the Lyndon public square, starting in 1840, but as the county seat was removed to Sterling one year later, it saw only a short period of use for its original purpose. Sterling then built a two-story square brick courthouse with a second-floor courtroom, within which several local churches worshipped before completing their buildings. It stood until the late 1870s, unoccupied after the county offices moved to Morrison, but after its demolition the site was redeveloped into a residential neighborhood. The third courthouse was completed in 1865 at a cost of over $14,000 (equivalent to $287,578 in 2024), it was a significantly larger building, 85 by 55 feet (26 m × 17 m), with an unusual circular courtroom, it was a two-story brick structure with county offices on the first floor and courtrooms on the second. The style was Italianate, due partly to features such as a domed cupola and doubled brackets under the eaves of the shallow roof.

== Current courthouse ==
Designed by Phillips Swager Associates, a Peoria architectural firm, the current courthouse was constructed between 1982 and 1987. A firmly modernist building, the courthouse features a wall of brick with a continuous course of windows at the center of each story. A large bay window, the height of the entire floor, projects from the top story atop a column-supported overhang that covers an outdoors walking area on one side of the building.
