= Tampico Township, Whiteside County, Illinois =

Coordinates: 41.636°N 89.806°W

Tampico Township
- Township
- Location in Whiteside County
- Country: United States
- State: Illinois
- County: Whiteside

Area
  - Total: 35.74 sq mi (92.6 km^{2})
  - Land: 35.74 sq mi (92.6 km^{2})
  - Water: 0 sq mi (0 km^{2}) 0%

Population (2010)
  - Estimate (2016): 1,097
  - Density: 32.1/sq mi (12.4/km^{2})
- Time zone: UTC-6 (CST)
  - Summer (DST): UTC-5 (CDT)
- FIPS code: 17-195-74483

Tampico Township is located in Whiteside County in the U.S. state of Illinois. As of the 2010 census, its population was 1,148 and it contained 449 housing units.

== Geography ==
According to the 2010 census, the township has a total area of 35.74 square miles (92.6 km^{2}), all land.

Historical population
Census	Pop.	Note	%±
2016 (est.)	1,097
U.S. Decennial Census

== Education ==
All of Tampico Township is in the Prophetstown-Lyndon-Tampico Community Unit School District 3.

There was previously a Tampico Township High School District 302, which operated a high school.
