= Unionville, Whiteside County, Illinois =

Unionville, Illinois
- Unincorporated community
- Location within Illinois Location within the United States
- Coordinates: 41°49′09″N 89°58′57″W
- Country: United States
- State: Illinois
- County: Whiteside
- Elevation: 669 ft (204 m)
- Time zone: UTC-6 (Central (CST))
  - Summer (DST): UTC-5 (CDT)
- Area codes: 815 & 779
- GNIS feature ID: 420148

Unionville is an unincorporated community in Union Grove Township, Whiteside County, Illinois, United States. Unionville is located on U.S. Route 30, 1.1 miles (1.8 km) northwest of Morrison.
