= Hume Township =

Hume Township may refer to:

- Hume Township, Whiteside County, Illinois
- Hume Township, Michigan
