= Alfred N. Abbott =

American politician

Alfred Noyes Abbott

Justice of the Peace, Ustick Township

Illinois House of Representatives

Personal details
- Born: November 2, 1862 Ustick Township, Whiteside County, Illinois, U.S.
- Died: September 14, 1929 (aged 66) Clinton, Iowa, U.S.
- Party: Republican

Alfred Noyes Abbott (November 2, 1862 – September 14, 1929) was an American farmer and politician.

Abbott was born in Ustick Township, Whiteside County, Illinois. He graduated from University of Illinois at Urbana–Champaign in 1885 and was a farmer. He served as a justice of the peace for Ustick Township and was a Republican. He served in the Illinois House of Representatives from 1899 to 1903 and from 1911 to 1915. Abbott died from a stroke at Jane Lamb Hospital in Clinton, Iowa, aged 66.
