= Clyde Township =

Clyde Township may refer to:

== Canada ==
- Clyde Township, a geographic township in the municipality of Dysart et al, Ontario

== United States ==
- Clyde Township, Allegan County, Michigan
- Clyde Township, St. Clair County, Michigan
- Clyde Township, Whiteside County, Illinois
