= Fenton Township =

Fenton Township may refer to the following places in the United States:

- Fenton Township, Whiteside County, Illinois
- Fenton Township, Kossuth County, Iowa
- Fenton Township, Michigan
- Fenton Township, Murray County, Minnesota
