= Hahnaman, Illinois =

- Unincorporated community
- Location within Illinois Location within the United States
- Coordinates: 41°37′54″N 89°38′06″W
- Country: United States
- State: Illinois
- County: Whiteside
- Elevation: 656 ft (200 m)
- Time zone: UTC-6 (Central (CST))
  - Summer (DST): UTC-5 (CDT)
- Area codes: 815 & 779
- GNIS feature ID: 422772

Hahnaman is an unincorporated community in Whiteside County, in the U.S. state of Illinois.

== History ==
The Hahnaman post office closed in 1920. The community was named from its location in Hahnaman Township.
