= Hopkins Township =

Hopkins Township may refer to the following places in the United States:

- Hopkins Township, Whiteside County, Illinois
- Hopkins Township, Michigan
- Hopkins Township, Nodaway County, Missouri
