= Flagg, Illinois =

Flagg
- Unincorporated community
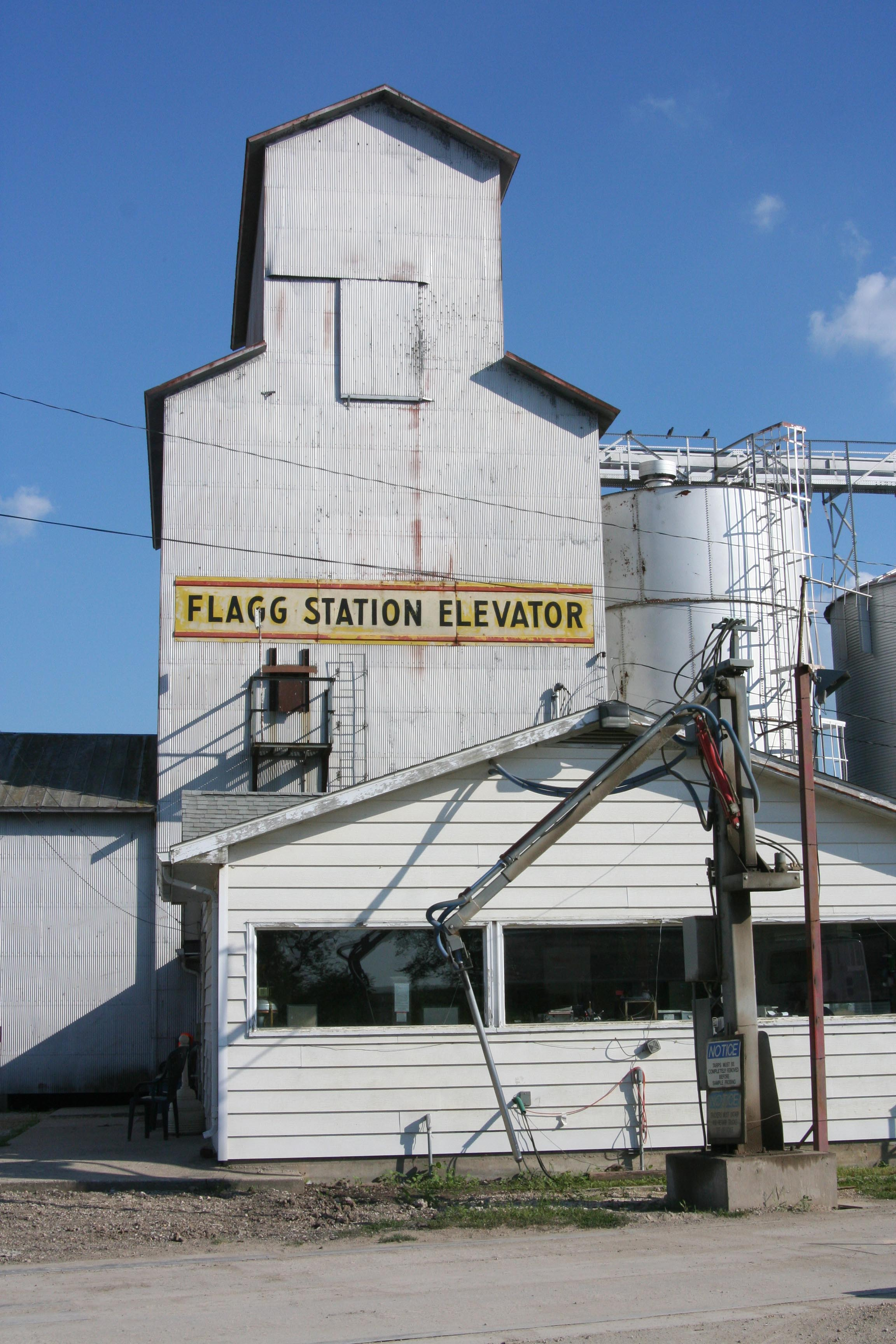
- Grain elevator in Flagg, Illinois

- Location within Ogle County Flagg (Illinois)
- Coordinates: 41°53′45″N 89°08′27″W
- Country: United States
- State: Illinois
- County: Ogle
- Township: Flagg
- Elevation: 781 ft (238 m)
- Time zone: UTC-6 (CST)
  - Summer (DST): UTC-5 (CDT)
- Zip code: 61029
- Area codes: 815, 779
- GNIS feature ID: 408425

Flagg is an unincorporated community in the southeastern portion of Ogle County in Flagg Township, Illinois, United States. It may be found at the crossroads of Grange and Titus Roads.

== History ==
Flagg took its name from its location in Flagg Township. The Flagg post office was discontinued in 1917.

In 1936, the Galena and Chicago Union Railroad had a station in Flagg.
