= Albany Township, Illinois =

Albany Township
- Township
- Location in Whiteside County
- Coordinates: 41°43′59″N 90°13′29″W
- Country: United States
- State: Illinois
- County: Whiteside

Area
  - Total: 12.84 sq mi (33.3 km^{2})
  - Land: 12.35 sq mi (32.0 km^{2})
  - Water: 0.49 sq mi (1.3 km^{2}) 3.82%

Population (2020)
  - Total: 1,041
  - Density: 87.1/sq mi (33.6/km^{2})
- Time zone: UTC-6 (CST)
  - Summer (DST): UTC-5 (CDT)
- FIPS code: 17-195-00529

Albany Township is located in Whiteside County, Illinois. As of the 2020 census, its population was 1,041 and it contained 486 housing units.

== Geography ==
According to the 2010 census, the township has a total area of 12.84 square miles (33.3 km^{2}), of which 12.35 square miles (32.0 km^{2}) (or 96.18%) is land and 0.49 square miles (1.3 km^{2}) (or 3.82%) is water.

== Demographics ==
Historical population
Census	Pop.	Note	%±
2020	1,041		—
U.S. Decennial Census
