= Jordan Township, Whiteside County, Illinois =

Jordan Township
- Township
- Location in Whiteside County
- Coordinates: 41°53′14″N 89°41′16″W
- Country: United States
- State: Illinois
- County: Whiteside
- Established: November 4, 1851

Area
  - Total: 35.86 sq mi (92.9 km^{2})
  - Land: 35.86 sq mi (92.9 km^{2})
  - Water: 0 sq mi (0 km^{2}) 0%
- Elevation: 741 ft (226 m)

Population (2010)
  - Estimate (2016): 873
  - Density: 25.1/sq mi (9.7/km^{2})
- Time zone: UTC-6 (CST)
  - Summer (DST): UTC-5 (CDT)
- FIPS code: 17-195-38700

Jordan Township is located in Whiteside County, Illinois. As of the 2010 census, its population was 899 and it contained 354 housing units.

== Geography ==
According to the 2010 census, the township has a total area of 35.86 square miles (92.9 km^{2}), all land.

== Demographics ==
Historical population
Census	Pop.	Note	%±
2016 (est.)	873
U.S. Decennial Census
