= Coleta, Illinois =

Coleta
- Village
- Location of Coleta in Whiteside County, Illinois.
- Coordinates: 41°54′07″N 89°47′59″W
- Country: United States
- State: Illinois
- County: Whiteside

Area
  - Total: 0.37 sq mi (0.96 km^{2})
  - Land: 0.37 sq mi (0.96 km^{2})
  - Water: 0 sq mi (0.00 km^{2})
- Elevation: 827 ft (252 m)

Population (2020)
  - Total: 167
  - Density: 450.9/sq mi (174.11/km^{2})
- Time zone: UTC-6 (CST)
  - Summer (DST): UTC-5 (CDT)
- ZIP code: 61081
- Area code: 815
- FIPS code: 17-15469
- GNIS feature ID: 2398597

Coleta is a village in Whiteside County, Illinois, United States. As of the 2020 census, Coleta had a population of 167.

== Geography ==
Coleta is located at 41°54′20″N 89°48′18″W (41.905566, -89.805016).

According to the 2010 census, Coleta has a total area of 0.6 square miles (1.55 km^{2}), all land.

== Demographics ==
Historical population
Census	Pop.	Note	%±
1880	163		—
1920	174		—
1930	160		−8.0%
1940	184		15.0%
1950	184		0.0%
1960	197		7.1%
1970	208		5.6%
1980	219		5.3%
1990	154		−29.7%
2000	155		0.6%
2010	164		5.8%
2020	167		1.8%
U.S. Decennial Census

As of the census of 2000, there were 155 people, 60 households, and 45 families residing in the village. The population density was 341.0 inhabitants per square mile (131.7/km^{2}). There were 71 housing units at an average density of 156.2 per square mile (60.3/km^{2}). The racial makeup of the village was 96.77% White, 1.29% African American, 0.65% Native American, and 1.29% from two or more races. Hispanic or Latino of any race were 3.23% of the population.

There were 60 households, out of which 36.7% had children under the age of 18 living with them, 61.7% were married couples living together, 10.0% had a female householder with no husband present, and 25.0% were non-families. 20.0% of all households were made up of individuals, and 5.0% had someone living alone who was 65 years of age or older. The average household size was 2.58 and the average family size was 3.00.

In the village, the population was spread out, with 27.1% under the age of 18, 5.2% from 18 to 24, 27.7% from 25 to 44, 26.5% from 45 to 64, and 13.5% who were 65 years of age or older. The median age was 39 years. For every 100 females, there were 101.3 males. For every 100 females age 18 and over, there were 101.8 males.

The median income for a household in the village was $40,000, and the median income for a family was $34,886. Males had a median income of $27,500 versus $20,469 for females. The per capita income for the village was $17,439. About 2.4% of families and 8.8% of the population were below the poverty line, including 5.7% of those under the age of eighteen and 7.4% of those 65 or over.

== Education ==
The school district is Sterling Community Unit District 5. Sterling High School is the zoned comprehensive high school.

Besides the local public schools, Christ Lutheran School, located in nearby Sterling, serves students of various religious backgrounds from Milledgeville to Walnut and from Morrison to Dixon. As part of the largest network of Protestant schools in the US, CLS provides an education for students from age 3 through 8th grade.
