= Sterling High School (Illinois) =

- Sterling High School

Location
- 1608 4th Ave; Sterling, Illinois; United States
- Coordinates: 41.80332°N 89.6912°W

Information
- Type: Public
- Locale: District
- Superintendent: Dr. Tad Everett
- Principal: Jason Austin
- Teaching staff: 53.57 (FTE)
- Grades: 9-12
- Enrollment: 996 (2023-2024)
- Student to teacher ratio: 18.53
- Colors: Navy and gold
- Mascot: Golden Warriors
- Website: https://www.sterlingpublicschools.org/o/shs

Sterling High School is a four year public high school located in Sterling, Illinois. The school district (of which this is the sole comprehensive high school) includes Sterling, the village of Coleta, and the census-designated places of Como and Galt. Three area middle schools feed into Sterling High School: Challand Middle School, St. Mary’s School, and Sterling Christian School.

== History ==
In 1886, voters approved $50,000 (equivalent to $1,791,700 in 2025) in bonds to build a high school in an Elizabethan architectural style, featuring a three-story brick structure with cut stone trimmings. Originally set to open on September 12, 1898, construction delays pushed the first day to October 3, 1898. The facility included eleven classrooms, a half-octagon assembly hall seating 279 students, science labs, an art room, and a library, though shelving remained empty due to funding shortages. The third floor was intended to house a gymnasium, and the basement included bicycle storage, lunchrooms, and a future manual training room, awaiting funding for equipment.

In 1930, the Sterling High School Board of Education purchased 15 acres of land for $10,000 to construct a stadium and track. Work on the athletic field began on June 29, 1931. By 1935, the estimated $30,000 cost for a concrete stadium with dressing rooms, restrooms, and concessions required outside funding. In October 1935, President Roosevelt’s Work Projects Administration (WPA) approved funding for 45% of the project. Construction began in 1936, but weather delays pushed back progress. The WPA increased its contribution to $40,000 in 1938, and the stadium was completed in 1939. It was officially dedicated on September 13, 1940.

In 1948, Sterling Township High School began constructing a new campus to accommodate increasing student enrollment. The original 1898 building, designed for 300 students, had become insufficient by the 1930s, but World War II material and funding shortages delayed expansion plans. Construction of the new school was completed in 1950, with the completion of the field house being delayed until 1952.

In the 1990s, four separate proposals to build an auditorium failed before a successful fundraising campaign led to the construction of the $4.5 million Centennial Auditorium, completed in 1998.

In 2013, a major renovation replaced the football field at Roscoe Eades Stadium with new synthetic turf, utilizing an infill mixture of sand and repurposed tires. In 2019, the stadium was renamed to Prescott Memorial Field.

== Academics ==
=== Profile ===
In the 2022-2023 school year, the student population at Sterling High School was predominantly White (52.6%) with 526 students. Hispanic students made up 37.3% of the population with 373 students. Smaller racial groups included Black students (2.3%) with 23 students, American Indian/Alaska Native (0.3%) with 3 students, Asian (1.1%) with 11 students, and two or more races (6.3%) with 63 students. 536 male and 464 female students enrolled. Nearly 55% of enrolled students are eligible for federal free or reduced lunch programs. In 2009, the school received $297,854 in Title I grant funding as part of the American Recovery and Reinvestment Act.

Sterling High School has a 21.1:1 student-teacher ratio and a drop-out rate of 2.1%. Over the past few years, student enrollment has seen a gradual decline, after peaking at 1,044 in 2018 and falling to 951 in 2024.

Students at Sterling High School take standardized tests in the 11th grade. In 2023, only 19.5% of students met or exceeded standards on the mathematics section of the SAT, compared to 26.7% of all comparable Illinois students. In the same year, 21.2% of students met or exceeded standards on the English Language Arts (ELA) section, underperforming against the state average of 31.6%. On the Illinois Science Assessment in the same year, 51.1% of students met or exceeded standards, compared to 52.2% statewide.

=== Curriculum ===
The Sterling High School curriculum includes traditional high school academic subjects, advanced academic classes, music, art, and foreign language, as well as programs in business and industrial education. To graduate, Sterling High School students must complete 22 credits, with requirements in English (4 credits), Math (3 credits), Science (2 credits), Social Studies (2.5 credits), Health and Physical Education (3.5 credits), and various electives. The school offers several college-level Advanced Placement courses for college credit. Students also have the option to enroll in dual credit courses through a partnership with Sauk Valley Community College in Dixon, Illinois.

== Extracurricial Activities ==
=== Athletics ===
The school's athletic teams, known as the "Golden Warriors", compete in the Western Big 6 Conference. The school offers a variety of sports programs, including football, cross country, volleyball, boys’ soccer, girls’ tennis, cheerleading, golf, basketball, wrestling, swimming, bowling, baseball, softball, and track & field.

=== State titles ===
Year	Class	Activity	Cite
1959	-	Debate	
1960	-	Debate	
1967	-	Girls Basketball	
2004	-	Group Interpretation	
2018	3A	Girls Volleyball	
2019	3A	Girls Volleyball	

== Notable alumni ==
- Lew Andreas, American football player
- Terry Brooks, author
- Keith L. Brown, former United States Ambassador to Denmark
- Leo J Wahl, founder of Wahl Clipper
- Paul Zaeske, American football player
- Malcolm Slaney, American electrical engineer and research scientist at Google
- Lexi Rodriguez, College volleyball player
- Michelle King, former Acting Commissioner of the Social Security Administration
- Caroline Kent, abstract artist
