= Mount Pleasant Township, Whiteside County, Illinois =

Coordinates: 41°47′59″N 89°55′33″W

Mount Pleasant Township
- Township
- Location in Whiteside County
- Country: United States
- State: Illinois
- County: Whiteside

Area
  - Total: 35.84 sq mi (92.8 km^{2})
  - Land: 35.8 sq mi (93 km^{2})
  - Water: 0.03 sq mi (0.078 km^{2}) 0.08%

Population (2010)
  - Estimate (2016): 4,829
  - Density: 138/sq mi (53/km^{2})
- Time zone: UTC-6 (CST)
  - Summer (DST): UTC-5 (CDT)
- FIPS code: 17-195-51076

Mount Pleasant Township is located in Whiteside County, Illinois. As of the 2010 census, its population was 4,939 and it contained 2,176 housing units.

== Geography ==
According to the 2010 census, the township has a total area of 35.84 square miles (92.8 km^{2}), of which 35.8 square miles (93 km^{2}) (or 99.89%) is land and 0.03 square miles (0.078 km^{2}) (or 0.08%) is water.

== Demographics ==
Historical population
Census	Pop.	Note	%±
2016 (est.)	4,829
U.S. Decennial Census
