= Prophetstown Township, Whiteside County, Illinois =

Coordinates: 41°38′22″N 89°54′40″W

Prophetstown Township
- Township
- Location in Whiteside County
- Country: United States
- State: Illinois
- County: Whiteside

Area
  - Total: 48.47 sq mi (125.5 km^{2})
  - Land: 47.95 sq mi (124.2 km^{2})
  - Water: 0.52 sq mi (1.3 km^{2}) 1.07%

Population (2010)
  - Estimate (2016): 2,510
  - Density: 54.5/sq mi (21.0/km^{2})
- Time zone: UTC-6 (CST)
  - Summer (DST): UTC-5 (CDT)
- FIPS code: 17-195-61990

Prophetstown Township is located in Whiteside County, Illinois, United States. As of the 2010 census, it had a population of 2,615 and it contained 1,162 housing units.

== Origin of name ==
According to the City of Prophetstown, the name honors 'Wa-bo-kie-shiek', a Native American prophet who served as advisor to Sauk chief Black Hawk in the 1800s. Half-Sauk and half-Winnebago, 'Wa-bo-kie-shiek' lived in a Winnebago village on the Rock River where the town stands today.

== Geography ==
According to the 2010 census, the township has a total area of 48.47 square miles (125.5 km^{2}), of which 47.95 square miles (124.2 km^{2}) (or 98.93%) is land and 0.52 square miles (1.3 km^{2}) (or 1.07%) is water.

== History ==
The City of Prophetstown states "the city had electric power in the 1896, and municipal water and telephone service in 1904." As of 2018, the township had an estimated 2,417 persons

Historical population
Census	Pop.	Note	%±
2016 (est.)	2,510
U.S. Decennial Census
