= Montmorency Township, Illinois =

Coordinates: 41°42′23″N 89°41′13″W

Montmorency Township
- Township
- Location in Whiteside County
- Country: United States
- State: Illinois
- County: Whiteside

Area
  - Total: 35.83 sq mi (92.8 km^{2})
  - Land: 35.78 sq mi (92.7 km^{2})
  - Water: 0.05 sq mi (0.13 km^{2}) 0.14%

Population (2010)
  - Estimate (2016): 2,551
  - Density: 73/sq mi (28/km^{2})
- Time zone: UTC-6 (CST)
  - Summer (DST): UTC-5 (CDT)
- FIPS code: 17-195-50270

Montmorency Township is located in Whiteside County, Illinois. As of the 2010 census, its population was 2,612 and it contained 1,027 housing units. It is located south of the city of Rock Falls.

== Geography ==
According to the 2010 census, the township has a total area of 35.83 square miles (92.8 km^{2}), of which 35.78 square miles (92.7 km^{2}) (or 99.86%) is land and 0.05 square miles (0.13 km^{2}) (or 0.14%) is water.

== Demographics ==
Historical population
Census	Pop.	Note	%±
2016 (est.)	2,551
U.S. Decennial Census
