= Fenton, Illinois =

- Unincorporated community
- Location within Illinois Location within the United States
- Coordinates: 41°43′50″N 90°01′48″W
- Country: United States
- State: Illinois
- County: Whiteside
- Elevation: 620 ft (190 m)
- Time zone: UTC-6 (Central (CST))
  - Summer (DST): UTC-5 (CDT)
- ZIP code: 61251
- Area codes: 815 & 779
- GNIS feature ID: 408322

Fenton is an unincorporated community in Whiteside County, Illinois. Fenton is located 6 miles (9.7 km) southwest of Morrison. The community has a post office with ZIP code 61251.
