= Genesee Township, Whiteside County, Illinois =

Genesee Township
- Township
- Location in Whiteside County
- Coordinates: 41°53′15″N 89°48′13″W
- Country: United States
- State: Illinois
- County: Whiteside

Area
  - Total: 35.41 sq mi (91.7 km^{2})
  - Land: 35.4 sq mi (92 km^{2})
  - Water: 0.01 sq mi (0.026 km^{2}) 0.03%
- Elevation: 804 ft (245 m)

Population (2010)
  - Estimate (2016): 759
  - Density: 22.1/sq mi (8.5/km^{2})
- Time zone: UTC-6 (CST)
  - Summer (DST): UTC-5 (CDT)
- FIPS code: 17-195-28833

Genesee Township is located in Whiteside County, Illinois. As of the 2010 census, its population was 784 and it contained 329 housing units.

== Geography ==
According to the 2010 census, the township has a total area of 35.41 square miles (91.7 km^{2}), of which 35.4 square miles (92 km^{2}) (or 99.97%) is land and 0.01 square miles (0.026 km^{2}) (or 0.03%) is water.

== Demographics ==
Historical population
Census	Pop.	Note	%±
2016 (est.)	759
U.S. Decennial Census
