= Erie Township, Illinois =

Erie Township
- Township
- Location in Whiteside County

- Location in Illinois
- Coordinates: 41°38′43″N 90°06′56″W
- Country: United States
- State: Illinois
- County: Whiteside
- Established: November 4, 1851
- Named for: Erie County

Area
  - Total: 24.68 sq mi (63.9 km^{2})
  - Land: 23.99 sq mi (62.1 km^{2})
  - Water: 0.69 sq mi (1.8 km^{2}) 2.80%
- Elevation: 581 ft (177 m)

Population (2010)
  - Estimate (2016): 1,928
  - Density: 83.6/sq mi (32.3/km^{2})
- Time zone: UTC-6 (CST)
  - Summer (DST): UTC-5 (CDT)
- FIPS code: 17-195-24387

Erie Township is located in Whiteside County, Illinois. As of the 2010 census, its population was 2,006 and it contained 836 housing units.

== History ==
Erie Township is named after Erie County, New York.

== Geography ==
According to the 2010 census, the township has a total area of 24.68 square miles (63.9 km^{2}), of which 23.99 square miles (62.1 km^{2}) (or 97.20%) is land and 0.69 square miles (1.8 km^{2}) (or 2.80%) is water.

== Demographics ==
Historical population
Census	Pop.	Note	%±
2010	2,006		—
2016 (est.)	1,928		−3.9%
U.S. Decennial Census
