= Ustick Township, Whiteside County, Illinois =

Coordinates: 41°53′21″N 90°02′04″W

Ustick Township
- Township
- Location in Whiteside County
- Country: United States
- State: Illinois
- County: Whiteside

Area
  - Total: 35.4 sq mi (92 km^{2})
  - Land: 35.39 sq mi (91.7 km^{2})
  - Water: 0.01 sq mi (0.026 km^{2}) 0.03%

Population (2010)
  - Estimate (2016): 593
  - Density: 17.3/sq mi (6.7/km^{2})
- Time zone: UTC-6 (CST)
  - Summer (DST): UTC-5 (CDT)
- FIPS code: 17-195-77070

Ustick Township is located in Whiteside County, Illinois. As of the 2010 census, its population was 613 and it contained 250 housing units.

== Geography ==
According to the 2010 census, the township has a total area of 35.4 square miles (92 km^{2}), of which 35.39 square miles (91.7 km^{2}) (or 99.97%) is land and 0.01 square miles (0.026 km^{2}) (or 0.03%) is water.

== Demographics ==
Historical population
Census	Pop.	Note	%±
2016 (est.)	593
U.S. Decennial Census

== Notable person ==
- Alfred N. Abbott (1862–1929), farmer and Illinois state representative, was born on a farm in Ustick Township.
