= Newton Township, Whiteside County, Illinois =

Coordinates: 41°42′56″N 90°09′00″W

Newton Township
- Township
- Location in Whiteside County
- Country: United States
- State: Illinois
- County: Whiteside

Area
  - Total: 35.94 sq mi (93.1 km^{2})
  - Land: 35.92 sq mi (93.0 km^{2})
  - Water: 0.01 sq mi (0.026 km^{2}) 0.03%

Population (2010)
  - Estimate (2016): 436
  - Density: 12.5/sq mi (4.8/km^{2})
- Time zone: UTC-6 (CST)
  - Summer (DST): UTC-5 (CDT)
- FIPS code: 17-195-52857

Newton Township is located in Whiteside County, Illinois. As of the 2010 census, its population was 450 and it contained 178 housing units.

== Geography ==
According to the 2010 census, the township has a total area of 35.94 square miles (93.1 km^{2}), of which 35.92 square miles (93.0 km^{2}) (or 99.94%) is land and 0.01 square miles (0.026 km^{2}) (or 0.03%) is water.

== Demographics ==
Historical population
Census	Pop.	Note	%±
2016 (est.)	436
U.S. Decennial Census
