= Lyndon Township, Whiteside County, Illinois =

Lyndon Township
- Township
- Location in Whiteside County
- Coordinates: 41°43′45″N 89°54′47″W
- Country: United States
- State: Illinois
- County: Whiteside
- Established: November 4, 1851

Area
  - Total: 28.08 sq mi (72.7 km^{2})
  - Land: 27.27 sq mi (70.6 km^{2})
  - Water: 0.81 sq mi (2.1 km^{2}) 2.88%
- Elevation: 620 ft (190 m)

Population (2010)
  - Estimate (2016): 1,016
  - Density: 38.8/sq mi (15.0/km^{2})
- Time zone: UTC-6 (CST)
  - Summer (DST): UTC-5 (CDT)
- FIPS code: 17-195-45291

Lyndon Township is located in Whiteside County, Illinois. As of the 2010 census, its population was 1,057 and it contained 460 housing units.

== Geography ==
According to the 2010 census, the township has a total area of 28.08 square miles (72.7 km^{2}), of which 27.27 square miles (70.6 km^{2}) (or 97.12%) is land and 0.81 square miles (2.1 km^{2}) (or 2.88%) is water.

== Demographics ==
Historical population
Census	Pop.	Note	%±
2016 (est.)	1,016
U.S. Decennial Census
