= Paul Zaeske =

American football player (1945–1992)

No. 87, 82
- Position: Wide receiver

Personal information
- Born: December 4, 1945; Sioux City, Iowa, U.S.
- Died: April 18, 1992 (aged 46)
- Listed height: 6 ft 2 in (1.88 m)
- Listed weight: 200 lb (91 kg)

Career information
- High school: Sterling (Sterling, Illinois)
- College: North Park
- NFL draft: 1969: undrafted

Career history
- Houston Oilers (1969–1970); Houston Texans (1974)
- Stats at Pro Football Reference

Paul Allan Zaeske (December 4, 1945 – April 18, 1992) was an American professional football wide receiver who played two seasons with the Houston Oilers of the American Football League (AFL) and National Football League (NFL). He played college football at North Park University. He was also a member of the Houston Texans of the World Football League (WFL).

== Early life ==
Paul Allan Zaeske was born on December 4, 1945, in Sioux City, Iowa. He attended Sterling High School in Sterling, Illinois.

== College career ==
Zaeske played college football for the North Park Vikings. Due to North Park having dual membership in the NCAA and NAIA, He set both the NCAA Division II and NAIA record for receiving touchdowns in a game. He did so with eight on October 12, 1968 against North Central College.

== Professional career ==
Zaeske played in eleven games for the Houston Oilers from 1969 to 1970.

Zaeske played for the Houston Texans of the World Football League in 1974 and caught two passes for 12 yards.

== Personal life ==
Zaeske died on April 18, 1992.
