= Fulton Township, Whiteside County, Illinois =

Fulton Township
- Township
- Location in Whiteside County
- Coordinates: 41°53′00″N 90°7′45″W
- Country: United States
- State: Illinois
- County: Whiteside

Area
  - Total: 21.45 sq mi (55.6 km^{2})
  - Land: 17.28 sq mi (44.8 km^{2})
  - Water: 4.17 sq mi (10.8 km^{2}) 19.44%
- Elevation: 587 ft (179 m)

Population (2010)
  - Estimate (2016): 4,076
  - Density: 246.1/sq mi (95.0/km^{2})
- Time zone: UTC-6 (CST)
  - Summer (DST): UTC-5 (CDT)
- FIPS code: 17-195-28157

Fulton Township is located in Whiteside County, Illinois, United States. As of the 2010 census, its population was 4,251 and it contained 2,032 housing units.

== Geography ==
According to the 2010 census, the township has a total area of 21.45 square miles (55.6 km^{2}), of which 17.28 square miles (44.8 km^{2}) (or 80.56%) is land and 4.17 square miles (10.8 km^{2}) (or 19.44%) is water.

== Demographics ==
Historical population
Census	Pop.	Note	%±
2016 (est.)	4,076
U.S. Decennial Census
