= Galt, Illinois =

- Census-designated place
- Location within Illinois Location within the United States
- Coordinates: 41°47′24″N 89°45′02″W
- Country: United States
- State: Illinois
- County: Whiteside

Area
  - Total: 0.29 sq mi (0.76 km^{2})
  - Land: 0.29 sq mi (0.76 km^{2})
  - Water: 0 sq mi (0.00 km^{2})
- Elevation: 633 ft (193 m)

Population (2020)
  - Total: 193
  - Density: 661.4/sq mi (255.37/km^{2})
- Time zone: UTC-6 (Central (CST))
  - Summer (DST): UTC-5 (CDT)
- ZIP code: 61037
- Area codes: 815 & 779
- GNIS feature ID: 2804102

Galt is an unincorporated community and Census-designated place in Whiteside County, Illinois, United States. Galt is 3 miles (4.8 km) west of Sterling and has a post office with ZIP code 61037. As of the 2020 census, Galt had a population of 193.

== History ==
The community was named for John Galt, an early landowner.

Town, depot and post office was founded in 1857 when the Galena and Chicago Union Railroad arrived. The Galena and Chicago Union Railroad later became the Chicago and North Western Railroad.

== Demographics ==
Historical population
Census	Pop.	Note	%±
2020	193		—
U.S. Decennial Census

Galt first appeared as a census designated place in the 2020 U.S. census.

== Education ==
The school district is Sterling Community Unit District 5. Sterling High School is the zoned comprehensive high school.
