= Hopkins Township, Whiteside County, Illinois =

Hopkins Township
- Township
- Location in Whiteside County
- Coordinates: 41.8°N 89.8°W
- Country: United States
- State: Illinois
- County: Whiteside

Area
  - Total: 35.99 sq mi (93.2 km^{2})
  - Land: 35.65 sq mi (92.3 km^{2})
  - Water: 0.33 sq mi (0.85 km^{2}) 0.92%

Population (2010)
  - Estimate (2016): 2,106
  - Density: 60.5/sq mi (23.4/km^{2})
- Time zone: UTC-6 (CST)
  - Summer (DST): UTC-5 (CDT)
- FIPS code: 17-195-36178

Hopkins Township is located in Whiteside County, Illinois. As of the 2010 census, its population was 2,156 and it contained 904 housing units.

== Geography ==
According to the 2010 census, the township has a total area of 35.99 square miles (93.2 km^{2}), of which 35.65 square miles (92.3 km^{2}) (or 99.06%) is land and 0.33 square miles (0.85 km^{2}) (or 0.92%) is water.

== Demographics ==
Historical population
Census	Pop.	Note	%±
2016 (est.)	2,106
U.S. Decennial Census
