= Prophetstown-Lyndon-Tampico Community Unit School District 3 =

School district in Illinois, United States

Prophetstown-Lyndon-Tampico Community Unit School District 3 (PLT) is a school district headquartered in Prophetstown, Illinois.

The district is mostly in Whiteside County, where it includes Prophetstown, Lyndon, Tampico, and Deer Grove. Other portions of the district are in Bureau and Henry counties.

== History ==
The district was formerly the Prophetstown-Lyndon Community Unit School District 3.

In 1995 Prophetstown-Lyndon voters rejected a school bond proposal.

The Prosphetstown board of trustees was scheduled to hold a meeting with that of the Tampico Community Unit School District 4 on January 16, 1996, to explore merging; the Tampico district was having financial issues at the time. The Illinois State Board of Education stated that on August 7, 1996, the Prosphetstown district annexed the former Tampico district. The Dispatch and the Rock Island Argus reported that the merger had been completed back in July 1996 as the Henry-Stark-Bureau Regional Board and Whiteside Regional Educational Board approved the annexation petition.

Dave Rogers became the superintendent in 2003. In 2016 he stated he would retire before the end of his contract, something not anticipated by the board of trustees. Ryan Inskeep, the president of the school board, stated that "It was really sudden, with no explanation whatsoever." Chad Colmone became the interim superintendent.

== Schools ==
- 6-12 Campus (Prophetstown)
- Prophetstown Elementary School
- Tampico Elementary School

Previously there were a Tampico Middle School and a Prophetstown High School. In April 2013 groundbreaking occurred for an addition that was built at the Prophetstown High property so the middle school grades could be moved from Tampico to Prophetstown. The school, post-addition, has over 60,000 square feet (5,600 m^{2}) of space.

The former Tampico Middle School received a more than 20,000-square-foot (1,900 m^{2}) addition and became the new Tampico Elementary School.
