= Sterling Township, Whiteside County, Illinois =

Coordinates: 41°48′49″N 89°41′20″W

Sterling Township
- Township
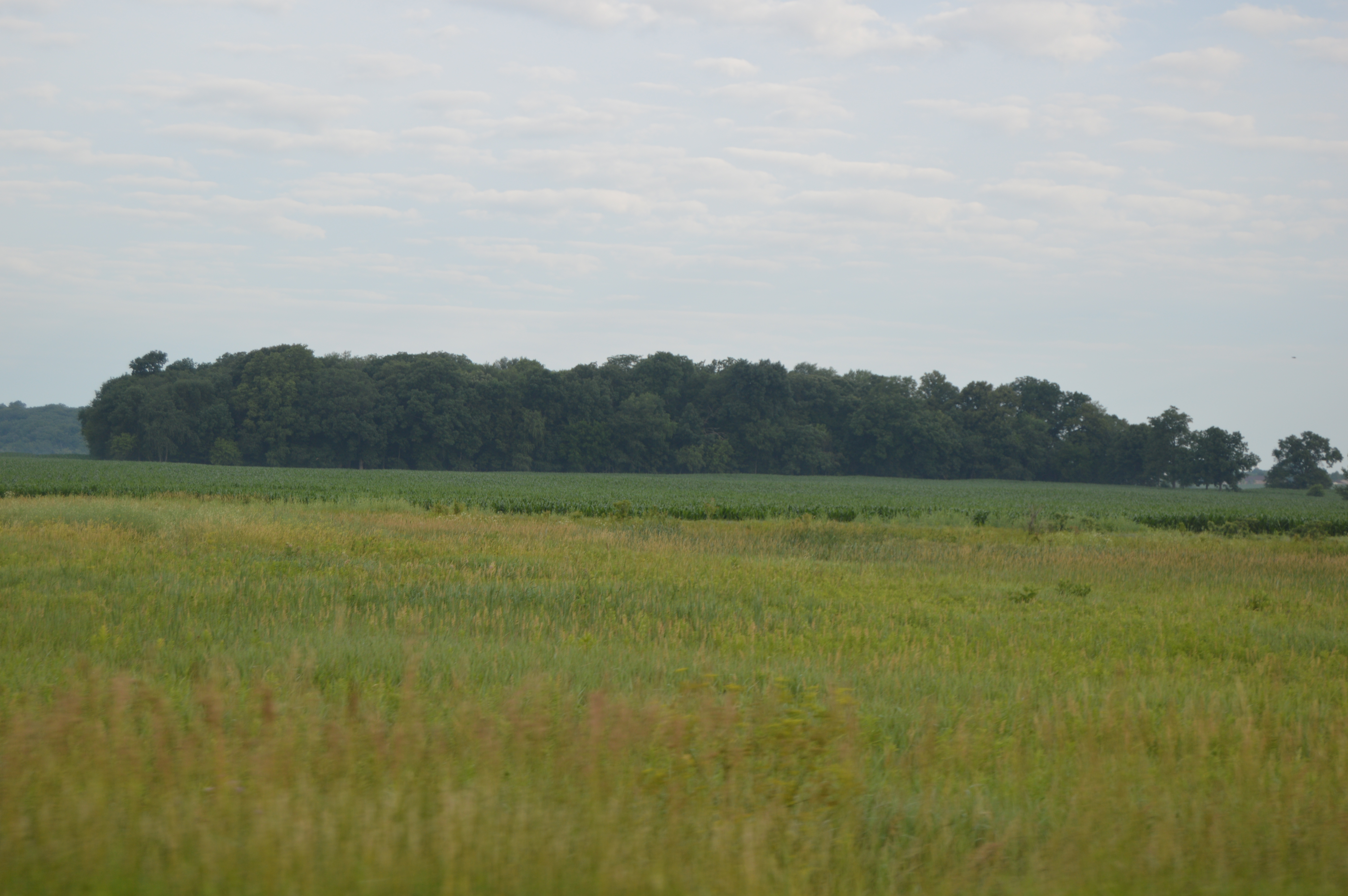
- Scenery north of the Sterling city limits

- Location in Whiteside County

- Location within Illinois Location within the United States
- Country: United States
- State: Illinois
- County: Whiteside

Area
  - Total: 24.5 sq mi (63 km^{2})
  - Land: 23.4 sq mi (61 km^{2})
  - Water: 1.1 sq mi (2.8 km^{2}) 4.49%

Population (2010)
  - Estimate (2016): 17,446
  - Density: 770.8/sq mi (297.6/km^{2})
- Time zone: UTC-6 (CST)
  - Summer (DST): UTC-5 (CDT)
- FIPS code: 17-195-72553
- Website: sterlingtownship.com

Sterling Township is located in Whiteside County, Illinois. As of the 2010 census, its population was 18,035 and it contained 8,003 housing units.

== Geography ==
According to the 2010 census, the township has a total area of 24.5 square miles (63 km^{2}), of which 23.4 square miles (61 km^{2}) (or 95.51%) is land and 1.1 square miles (2.8 km^{2}) (or 4.49%) is water.

== Demographics ==
Historical population
Census	Pop.	Note	%±
2016 (est.)	17,446
U.S. Decennial Census
