= Fenton Township, Whiteside County, Illinois =

Fenton Township
- Township
- Location in Whiteside County
- Coordinates: 41°42′51″N 90°2′6″W
- Country: United States
- State: Illinois
- County: Whiteside

Area
  - Total: 35.26 sq mi (91.3 km^{2})
  - Land: 34.9 sq mi (90 km^{2})
  - Water: 0.36 sq mi (0.93 km^{2}) 1.02%
- Elevation: 617 ft (188 m)

Population (2010)
  - Estimate (2016): 519
  - Density: 15.4/sq mi (5.9/km^{2})
- Time zone: UTC-6 (CST)
  - Summer (DST): UTC-5 (CDT)
- FIPS code: 17-195-25817

Fenton Township is located in Whiteside County, Illinois, United States. As of the 2010 census, its population was 536 and it contained 236 housing units.

== Geography ==
According to the 2010 census, the township has a total area of 35.26 square miles (91.3 km^{2}), of which 34.9 square miles (90 km^{2}) (or 98.98%) is land and 0.36 square miles (0.93 km^{2}) (or 1.02%) is water.

== Demographics ==
Historical population
| Census | Pop. | Note | %± |
|---|---|---|---|
| 2016 (est.) | 519 |
U.S. Decennial Census
