= Clyde Township, Illinois =

Clyde Township
- Township
- Location in Whiteside County
- Coordinates: 41°53′17″N 89°55′12″W
- Country: United States
- State: Illinois
- County: Whiteside
- Established: November 4, 1851

Area
  - Total: 35.91 sq mi (93.0 km^{2})
  - Land: 35.81 sq mi (92.7 km^{2})
  - Water: 0.1 sq mi (0.26 km^{2}) 0.28%
- Elevation: 679 ft (207 m)

Population (2010)
  - Estimate (2016): 389
  - Density: 11.2/sq mi (4.3/km^{2})
- Time zone: UTC-6 (CST)
  - Summer (DST): UTC-5 (CDT)
- FIPS code: 17-195-15144

Clyde Township is located in Whiteside County, Illinois. As of the 2010 census, its population was 402 and it contained 186 housing units.

== Geography ==
According to the 2010 census, the township has a total area of 35.91 square miles (93.0 km^{2}), of which 35.81 square miles (92.7 km^{2}) (or 99.72%) is land and 0.1 square miles (0.26 km^{2}) (or 0.28%) is water.

== Demographics ==
Historical population
Census	Pop.	Note	%±
2016 (est.)	389
U.S. Decennial Census
