= Hume Township, Whiteside County, Illinois =

Hume Township
- Township
- Location in Whiteside County
- Coordinates: 41.71°N 89.80°W
- Country: United States
- State: Illinois
- County: Whiteside

Area
  - Total: 30.06 sq mi (77.9 km^{2})
  - Land: 29.44 sq mi (76.2 km^{2})
  - Water: 0.62 sq mi (1.6 km^{2}) 2.06%

Population (2010)
  - Estimate (2016): 398
  - Density: 14/sq mi (5.4/km^{2})
- Time zone: UTC-6 (CST)
  - Summer (DST): UTC-5 (CDT)
- FIPS code: 17-195-36581

Hume Township is located in Whiteside County, Illinois. As of the 2010 census, its population was 411 and it contained 194 housing units.

== Geography ==
According to the 2010 census, the township has a total area of 30.06 square miles (77.9 km^{2}), of which 29.44 square miles (76.2 km^{2}) (or 97.94%) is land and 0.62 square miles (1.6 km^{2}) (or 2.06%) is water.

== Demographics ==
Historical population
Census	Pop.	Note	%±
2016 (est.)	398
U.S. Decennial Census
