= Como, Illinois =

- Census-designated place
- Location within Illinois
- Coordinates: 41°46′06″N 89°45′35″W
- Country: United States
- State: Illinois
- County: Whiteside

Area
  - Total: 1.15 sq mi (2.99 km^{2})
  - Land: 1.07 sq mi (2.76 km^{2})
  - Water: 0.089 sq mi (0.23 km^{2})
- Elevation: 633 ft (193 m)

Population (2020)
  - Total: 528
  - Density: 495.5/sq mi (191.32/km^{2})
- Time zone: UTC-6 (Central (CST))
  - Summer (DST): UTC-5 (CDT)
- Area codes: 815 & 779
- GNIS feature ID: 2629861

Como is a census-designated place in Whiteside County, Illinois, United States. As of the 2020 census, Como had a population of 528.

== Demographics ==
Historical population
Census	Pop.	Note	%±
2020	528		—
U.S. Decennial Census

== Education ==
The school district is Sterling Community Unit District 5. Sterling High School is the zoned comprehensive high school.
