= Round Grove, Illinois =

- Unincorporated community
- Location within Illinois Location within the United States
- Coordinates: 41°47′06″N 89°52′19″W
- Country: United States
- State: Illinois
- County: Whiteside
- Elevation: 679 ft (207 m)
- Time zone: UTC-6 (Central (CST))
  - Summer (DST): UTC-5 (CDT)
- Area codes: 815 & 779
- GNIS feature ID: 416982

Round Grove is an unincorporated community in Whiteside County, in the U.S. state of Illinois.

== History ==
A post office called Round Grove was established in 1839, and remained in operation until it was discontinued in 1973. The community was named from a "large round grove" near the original town site.
