= Union Grove, Illinois =

- Unincorporated community
- Location within Illinois Location within the United States
- Coordinates: 41°50′03″N 90°01′35″W
- Country: United States
- State: Illinois
- County: Whiteside
- Elevation: 689 ft (210 m)
- Time zone: UTC-6 (Central (CST))
  - Summer (DST): UTC-5 (CDT)
- Area codes: 815 & 779
- GNIS feature ID: 420071

Union Grove is an unincorporated community in Whiteside County, in the U.S. state of Illinois.

== History ==
A post office called Union Grove was in operation from 1840 until 1926. Union Grove was named from two nearby, nearly identical groves.
