= Union Grove Township, Whiteside County, Illinois =

Coordinates: 41°48′53″N 90°02′01″W

Union Grove Township
- Township
- Location in Whiteside County
- Country: United States
- State: Illinois
- County: Whiteside

Area
  - Total: 35.09 sq mi (90.9 km^{2})
  - Land: 35.09 sq mi (90.9 km^{2})
  - Water: 0 sq mi (0 km^{2}) 0%

Population (2010)
  - Estimate (2016): 1,214
  - Density: 35.4/sq mi (13.7/km^{2})
- Time zone: UTC-6 (CST)
  - Summer (DST): UTC-5 (CDT)
- FIPS code: 17-195-76758

Union Grove Township is located in Whiteside County, Illinois. As of the 2010 census, its population was 1,244 and it contained 519 housing units.

== Geography ==
According to the 2010 census, the township has a total area of 35.09 square miles (90.9 km^{2}), all land.

== Demographics ==
Historical population
Census	Pop.	Note	%±
2016 (est.)	1,214
U.S. Decennial Census
