= Lyndon, Illinois =

Lyndon
- Village
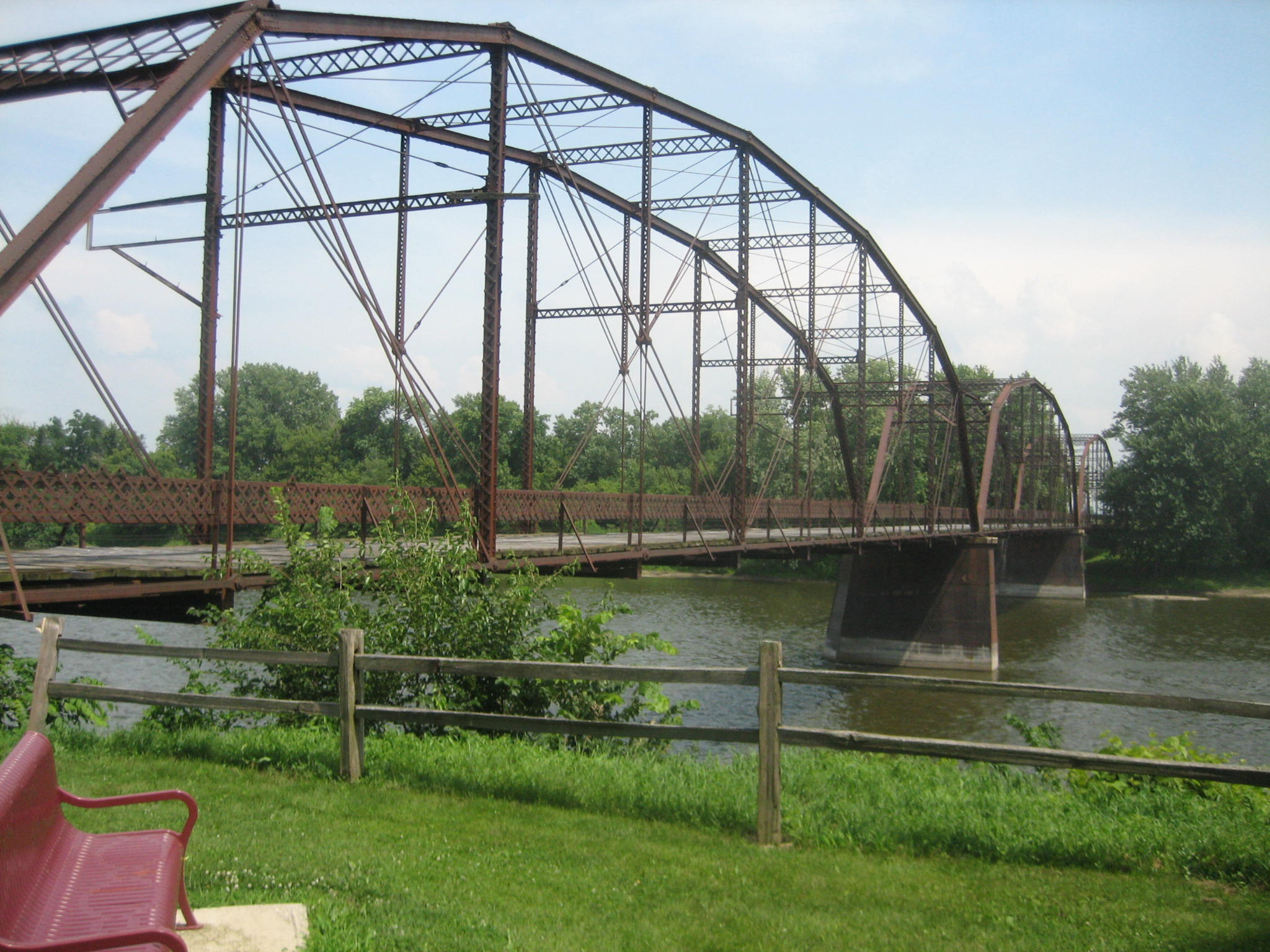
- Lyndon bridge

- Location of Lyndon in Whiteside County, Illinois.
- Coordinates: 41°43′03″N 89°55′26″W
- Country: United States
- State: Illinois
- County: Whiteside

Area
  - Total: 0.76 sq mi (1.96 km^{2})
  - Land: 0.76 sq mi (1.96 km^{2})
  - Water: 0 sq mi (0.00 km^{2})
- Elevation: 614 ft (187 m)

Population (2020)
  - Total: 537
  - Density: 709.6/sq mi (273.98/km^{2})
- Time zone: UTC-6 (CST)
  - Summer (DST): UTC-5 (CDT)
- ZIP Code(s): 61261
- Area code: 815
- FIPS code: 17-45278
- GNIS feature ID: 2399208
- Website: villageoflyndon.org

Lyndon is a village in Whiteside County, Illinois, United States. The population was 537 at the 2020 census, down from 648 in the 2010 census.

== Geography ==
According to the 2010 census, Lyndon has a total area of 0.781 square miles (2.02 km^{2}), of which 0.78 square miles (2.02 km^{2}) (or 99.87%) is land and 0.001 square miles (0.00 km^{2}) (or 0.13%) is water.

== Demographics ==
Historical population
Census	Pop.	Note	%±
1880	557		—
1890	461		−17.2%
1900	430		−6.7%
1910	390		−9.3%
1920	325		−16.7%
1930	383		17.8%
1940	476		24.3%
1950	594		24.8%
1960	677		14.0%
1970	673		−0.6%
1980	777		15.5%
1990	615		−20.8%
2000	566		−8.0%
2010	648		14.5%
2020	537		−17.1%
U.S. Decennial Census

As of the census of 2000, there were 566 people, 236 households, and 165 families residing in the village. The population density was 689.6 inhabitants per square mile (266.3/km^{2}). There were 254 housing units at an average density of 309.4 per square mile (119.5/km^{2}). The racial makeup of the village was 96.64% White, 0.18% African American, 1.24% Native American, 0.18% Asian, 0.35% from other races, and 1.41% from two or more races. Hispanic or Latino of any race were 1.24% of the population.

There were 236 households, out of which 27.1% had children under the age of 18 living with them, 57.6% were married couples living together, 8.5% had a female householder with no husband present, and 29.7% were non-families. 24.2% of all households were made up of individuals, and 14.0% had someone living alone who was 65 years of age or older. The average household size was 2.40 and the average family size was 2.81.

In the village, the population was spread out, with 21.7% under the age of 18, 7.6% from 18 to 24, 28.4% from 25 to 44, 27.7% from 45 to 64, and 14.5% who were 65 years of age or older. The median age was 41 years. For every 100 females, there were 102.1 males. For every 100 females age 18 and over, there were 96.9 males.

The median income for a household in the village was $37,375, and the median income for a family was $41,528. Males had a median income of $30,469 versus $22,813 for females. The per capita income for the village was $16,870. About 5.6% of families and 6.8% of the population were below the poverty line, including 3.6% of those under age 18 and 10.5% of those age 65 or over.

Lyndon is also known as the "Crow Capital of the World", celebrated in the past with a Crow Festival. The village at one time had an official mascot which was a real life crow, named Rocky the Crow. Lyndon is the home of Wright's Easter Egg Hunt held in Richmond park. The annual event is one of the largest free small-town Easter Egg hunts in Illinois with 4,000 people attending in 2018.

== Education ==
Prophetstown-Lyndon-Tampico Community Unit School District 3 is the public school district.

Besides the local public schools, Christ Lutheran School, located in nearby Sterling, serves students of various religious backgrounds from Walnut to Milledgeville and from Morrison to Dixon. As part of the largest network of Protestant schools in the US, CLS provides an education for students from age 3 through 8th grade.
