= Whiteside County, Illinois =

County in Illinois, United States

- County
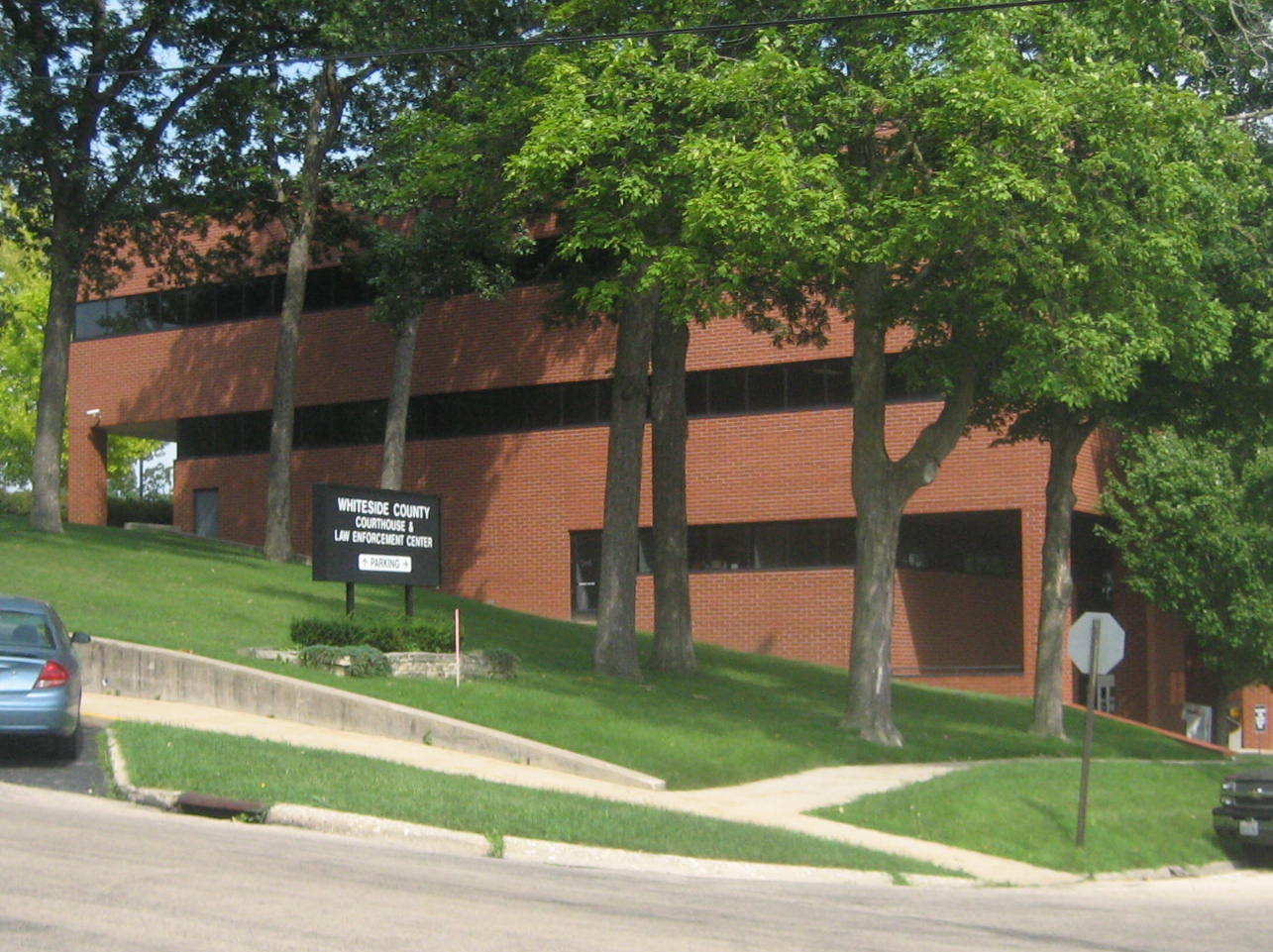
- Whiteside County Courthouse, Morrison

- Logo

- Location within the U.S. state of Illinois
- Coordinates: 41°45′N 89°55′W
- Country: United States
- State: Illinois
- Founded: 1836
- Named for: Samuel Whiteside
- Seat: Morrison
- Largest city: Sterling

Area
  - Total: 697 sq mi (1,810 km^{2})
  - Land: 684 sq mi (1,770 km^{2})
  - Water: 12 sq mi (31 km^{2}) 1.8%

Population (2020)
  - Total: 55,691
  - Estimate (2025): 54,121 ▼
  - Density: 81.4/sq mi (31.4/km^{2})
- Time zone: UTC−6 (Central)
  - Summer (DST): UTC−5 (CDT)
- Congressional district: 17th
- Website: www.whitesidecountyil.gov

Whiteside County is a county located in the U.S. state of Illinois. According to the 2020 census, it had a population of 55,691. Its county seat is Morrison. The county is bounded on the west by the Mississippi River. Whiteside County comprises the Sterling, IL Micropolitan Statistical Area, which is also included in the Dixon-Sterling, IL Combined Statistical Area. U.S. President Ronald Reagan was born in 1911 in the Whiteside County community of Tampico.

== History ==
This area was long occupied by varying cultures of Native Americans.

Whiteside County was organized by European Americans in 1836 from parts of Jo Daviess and Henry counties. It was named for General Samuel Whiteside, an Illinois officer in the War of 1812 and Black Hawk War.

Whiteside County's boundaries have remained unchanged since its creation in 1836.

== Geography ==
According to the U.S. Census Bureau, the county has a total area of 697 square miles (1,810 km^{2}), of which 684 square miles (1,770 km^{2}) is land and 12 square miles (31 km^{2}) (1.8%) is water.

=== Climate and weather ===
Morrison, Illinois

Climate chart (precipitation, max. and min. temperature)
J	F	M	A	M	J	J	A	S	O	N	D
1.5 29 10	1.5 34 15	2.8 47 27	3.7 60 37	4.4 72 48	4.6 82 58	3.7 85 62	4.7 83 59	2.9 76 51	2.8 64 39	2.9 47 28	2.1 34 16
- █ Average max. and min. temperatures in °F
- █ Precipitation totals in inches
- Source: The Weather Channel
Metric conversion
J	F	M	A	M	J	J	A	S	O	N	D
39 −2 −12	38 1 −9	71 8 −3	94 16 3	112 22 9	116 28 14	94 29 17	119 28 15	73 24 11	72 18 4	74 8 −2	54 1 −9
- █ Average max. and min. temperatures in °C
- █ Precipitation totals in mm

In recent years, average temperatures in the county seat of Morrison have ranged from a low of 10 °F (−12 °C) in January to a high of 85 °F (29 °C) in July, although a record low of −30 °F (−34 °C) was recorded in February 1905 and a record high of 112 °F (44 °C) was recorded in July 1936. Average monthly precipitation ranged from 1.51 inches (38 mm) in February to 4.69 inches (119 mm) in August.

=== Major highways ===
- Interstate 88
- U.S. Highway 30
- Illinois Route 2
- Illinois Route 40
- Illinois Route 78
- Illinois Route 84
- Illinois Route 110
- Illinois Route 136
- Illinois Route 172

=== Adjacent counties ===
- Carroll County (north)
- Ogle County (northeast)
- Lee County (east)
- Bureau County (southeast)
- Henry County (south)
- Rock Island County (southwest)
- Clinton County, Iowa (west)

=== National protected area ===
- Upper Mississippi River National Wildlife and Fish Refuge (part)

== Demographics ==
Historical population
Census	Pop.	Note	%±
1840	2,514		—
1850	5,361		113.2%
1860	18,737		249.5%
1870	27,503		46.8%
1880	30,885		12.3%
1890	30,854		−0.1%
1900	34,710		12.5%
1910	34,507		−0.6%
1920	36,174		4.8%
1930	39,019		7.9%
1940	43,338		11.1%
1950	49,336		13.8%
1960	59,887		21.4%
1970	62,877		5.0%
1980	65,970		4.9%
1990	60,186		−8.8%
2000	60,653		0.8%
2010	58,498		−3.6%
2020	55,691		−4.8%
2025 (est.)	54,121	▼	−2.8%
U.S. Decennial Census; 1790-1960 1900-1990; 1990-2000 2010

=== 2020 census ===
As of the 2020 census, the county had a population of 55,691. The median age was 44.4 years, with 21.7% of residents under the age of 18 and 22.1% aged 65 or older. For every 100 females there were 98.2 males, and for every 100 females age 18 and over there were 97.0 males age 18 and over.

The racial makeup of the county was 85.8% White, 1.5% Black or African American, 0.4% American Indian and Alaska Native, 0.6% Asian, less than 0.1% Native Hawaiian and Pacific Islander, 3.8% from some other race, and 7.9% from two or more races. Hispanic or Latino residents of any race comprised 12.8% of the population.

56.4% of residents lived in urban areas, while 43.6% lived in rural areas.

There were 23,556 households in the county, of which 27.0% had children under the age of 18 living in them. Of all households, 46.5% were married-couple households, 19.5% were households with a male householder and no spouse or partner present, and 26.0% were households with a female householder and no spouse or partner present. About 31.0% of all households were made up of individuals and 15.0% had someone living alone who was 65 years of age or older.

There were 25,855 housing units, of which 8.9% were vacant. Among occupied housing units, 73.6% were owner-occupied and 26.4% were renter-occupied. The homeowner vacancy rate was 2.2% and the rental vacancy rate was 9.3%.

=== Racial and ethnic composition ===
Whiteside County, Illinois – Racial and ethnic composition Note: the US Census treats Hispanic/Latino as an ethnic category. This table excludes Latinos from the racial categories and assigns them to a separate category. Hispanics/Latinos may be of any race.
Race / Ethnicity (NH = Non-Hispanic)	Pop 1980	Pop 1990	Pop 2000	Pop 2010	Pop 2020	% 1980	% 1990	% 2000	% 2010	% 2020
White alone (NH)	60,821	55,058	53,946	50,263	45,341	92.19%	91.48%	88.94%	85.92%	81.42%
Black or African American alone (NH)	314	379	577	705	741	0.48%	0.63%	0.95%	1.21%	1.33%
Native American or Alaska Native alone (NH)	75	74	102	90	60	0.11%	0.12%	0.17%	0.15%	0.11%
Asian alone (NH)	167	167	247	269	306	0.25%	0.28%	0.41%	0.46%	0.55%
Native Hawaiian or Pacific Islander alone (NH)	x	x	3	2	9	x	x	0.00%	0.00%	0.02%
Other race alone (NH)	69	46	17	35	149	0.10%	0.08%	0.03%	0.06%	0.27%
Mixed race or Multiracial (NH)	x	x	414	679	1,954	x	x	0.68%	1.16%	3.51%
Hispanic or Latino (any race)	4,524	4,462	5,347	6,455	7,131	6.86%	7.41%	8.82%	11.03%	12.80%
Total	65,970	60,186	60,653	58,498	55,691	100.00%	100.00%	100.00%	100.00%	100.00%

=== 2010 census ===
As of the 2010 United States census, there were 58,498 people, 23,740 households, and 16,005 families residing in the county. The population density was 85.5 inhabitants per square mile (33.0/km^{2}). There were 25,770 housing units at an average density of 37.7 per square mile (14.6/km^{2}). The racial makeup of the county was 92.2% white, 1.3% black or African American, 0.5% Asian, 0.3% American Indian, 3.5% from other races, and 2.2% from two or more races. Those of Hispanic or Latino origin made up 11.0% of the population. In terms of ancestry, 32.5% were German, 15.5% were Irish, 8.7% were Dutch, 8.6% were English, and 6.0% were American.

Of the 23,740 households, 30.4% had children under the age of 18 living with them, 51.5% were married couples living together, 11.0% had a female householder with no husband present, 32.6% were non-families, and 27.7% of all households were made up of individuals. The average household size was 2.42 and the average family size was 2.92. The median age was 41.8 years.

The median income for a household in the county was $45,266 and the median income for a family was $54,242. Males had a median income of $41,862 versus $29,157 for females. The per capita income for the county was $23,405. About 8.2% of families and 11.2% of the population were below the poverty line, including 17.6% of those under age 18 and 5.8% of those age 65 or over.

== Communities ==
=== Cities ===
- Fulton
- Morrison (county seat)
- Prophetstown
- Rock Falls
- Sterling

=== Villages ===
- Albany
- Coleta
- Deer Grove
- Erie
- Lyndon
- Tampico

=== Unincorporated communities ===
- Agnew
- Fenton
- Galt
- Hahnaman
- Round Grove
- Spring Hill
- Union Grove
- Unionville

=== Census-designated place ===
- Como
- Galt

=== Townships ===
Whiteside County is divided into these townships:

- Albany
- Clyde
- Coloma
- Erie
- Fenton
- Fulton
- Garden Plain
- Genesee
- Hahnaman
- Hopkins
- Hume
- Jordan
- Lyndon
- Montmorency
- Mount Pleasant
- Newton
- Portland
- Prophetstown
- Sterling
- Tampico
- Union Grove
- Ustick

== Politics ==
United States presidential election results for Whiteside County, Illinois
Year	Republican		Democratic		Third party(ies)	
Year	No.	%	No.	%	No.	%
1892	3,819	54.00%	2,779	39.30%	474	6.70%
1896	5,577	65.43%	2,788	32.71%	159	1.87%
1900	5,663	65.19%	2,758	31.75%	266	3.06%
1904	5,636	71.17%	1,546	19.52%	737	9.31%
1908	5,257	65.74%	2,140	26.76%	600	7.50%
1912	1,437	18.64%	1,996	25.89%	4,278	55.48%
1916	10,045	69.24%	3,839	26.46%	623	4.29%
1920	10,923	81.74%	1,927	14.42%	513	3.84%
1924	11,532	74.04%	1,957	12.56%	2,087	13.40%
1928	13,580	76.60%	4,079	23.01%	69	0.39%
1932	11,388	61.14%	7,010	37.64%	228	1.22%
1936	12,666	59.62%	7,982	37.57%	595	2.80%
1940	15,752	67.77%	7,356	31.65%	134	0.58%
1944	14,162	71.21%	5,555	27.93%	171	0.86%
1948	12,922	70.32%	5,299	28.84%	154	0.84%
1952	17,294	73.28%	6,238	26.43%	67	0.28%
1956	17,589	73.95%	6,158	25.89%	37	0.16%
1960	17,434	65.56%	9,112	34.27%	46	0.17%
1964	12,940	50.79%	12,536	49.21%	0	0.00%
1968	15,177	61.86%	8,132	33.15%	1,225	4.99%
1972	17,305	68.40%	7,909	31.26%	87	0.34%
1976	14,308	55.34%	11,255	43.53%	291	1.13%
1980	17,389	66.72%	7,191	27.59%	1,484	5.69%
1984	16,743	59.59%	11,226	39.96%	127	0.45%
1988	12,978	53.05%	11,328	46.31%	156	0.64%
1992	10,146	37.37%	12,329	45.41%	4,678	17.23%
1996	8,859	37.95%	11,913	51.03%	2,572	11.02%
2000	11,252	45.30%	12,886	51.88%	699	2.81%
2004	12,959	48.22%	13,723	51.07%	191	0.71%
2008	10,883	40.32%	15,607	57.82%	504	1.87%
2012	10,448	40.45%	14,833	57.43%	547	2.12%
2016	12,615	49.31%	11,035	43.14%	1,932	7.55%
2020	14,527	52.95%	12,253	44.67%	653	2.38%
2024	14,898	56.11%	11,012	41.48%	640	2.41%

Whiteside County has a political history typical of Yankee-settled Northern Illinois. Between its first election in 1840, and 1852, it always favored the Whig Party, and although Whiteside was not as strong for the Free Soil Party as counties to the east like Boone and Lake, it gave substantial votes to that party in 1848 and 1852 and became powerfully Republican for the next century-and-a-quarter. Between 1856 and 1988 the only time Whiteside failed to vote for the Republican candidate was in 1912, when Progressive Party nominee and former President Theodore Roosevelt won it by a 2-to-1 margin over conservative incumbent William Howard Taft. Between at least 1880 and 1960, no Democratic presidential nominee ever won 40 percent of Whiteside's vote, and even Alf Landon in 1936 carried the county by 22 percent when losing 46 of 48 states.

In 1964, the Republican Party nominated Barry Goldwater, whose hostility to the Yankee establishment and strongly conservative policies were sufficient to leave many traditional Republicans to stay home or even to vote for Lyndon Johnson. In this climate, Goldwater managed to keep the Republican Party's winning streak in Whiteside alive, but by just 1.6%, or 404 votes.

The county continued to vote comfortably more Republican than the nation for the next four elections, including for county native Ronald Reagan. But in 1984, even as Reagan increased his national margin by over 8%, his margin in Whiteside was more than halved, from a little over 40% in 1980 to 19.6% in 1984. The county was only marginally more Republican than the nation in 1984. The Democratic trend continued in 1988, as George H. W. Bush carried it by 6.8%, a somewhat smaller margin than he won the national popular vote by, making that election the first one in which Whiteside voted more Democratic than the nation in at least a century. In 1992, it gave Bill Clinton a plurality win, with a comfortable 8.0% margin over George H. W. Bush. In 1996, the county gave Bill Clinton an outright majority. The county went on to vote Democratic for the next four consecutive elections, giving Gore, Kerry, and Obama four straight majorities.

However, in 2016, concerns over long-term economic decline saw much of the Rust Belt swing heavily towards Donald Trump, and Whiteside flipped from a 16.9% Obama win in 2012 to a Trump plurality in 2016. In 2020, Trump won a majority—the first for a Republican since 1988—and increased his margin from 6.2% to 8.3%.

== Education ==
K-12 School districts include:

- Bureau Valley Community Unit School District 340
- Chadwick-Milledgeville Community Unit School District 399
- Erie Community Unit School District 1
- Morrison Community Unit School District 6
- Polo Community Unit School District 222
- Prophetstown-Lyndon-Tampico Community Unit School District 3
- River Bend Community Unit District 2
- Sterling Community Unit District 5

There is one secondary school district, Rock Falls Township High School District 301.

Elementary school districts include:

- East Coloma-Nelson Consolidated Elementary School District 20
- Montmorency Community Consolidated School District 145
- Rock Falls Elementary School District 13

== See also ==
- List of counties in Illinois
- National Register of Historic Places listings in Whiteside County, Illinois
