= Hahnaman Township, Whiteside County, Illinois =

Hahnaman Township
- Township
- Location in Whiteside County
- Coordinates: 41°37′41″N 89°41′23″W
- Country: United States
- State: Illinois
- County: Whiteside

Area
  - Total: 35.75 sq mi (92.6 km^{2})
  - Land: 35.75 sq mi (92.6 km^{2})
  - Water: 0 sq mi (0 km^{2}) 0%
- Elevation: 646 ft (197 m)

Population (2010)
  - Estimate (2016): 386
  - Density: 11.2/sq mi (4.3/km^{2})
- Time zone: UTC-6 (CST)
  - Summer (DST): UTC-5 (CDT)
- FIPS code: 17-195-32174

Hahnaman Township is located in Whiteside County, Illinois. As of the 2010 census, its population was 399 and it contained 148 housing units.

== History ==
Hahnaman Township was named for Samuel Hahnemann, founder of homeopathy.

== Geography ==
According to the 2010 census, the township has a total area of 35.75 square miles (92.6 km^{2}), all land.

== Demographics ==
Historical population
Census	Pop.	Note	%±
2016 (est.)	386
U.S. Decennial Census
