= U.S. Route 30 in Illinois =

Highway in Illinois

U.S. Route 30
- US 30 highlighted in red

Route information
- Maintained by IDOT
- Length: 153.79 mi (247.50 km)
- Existed: 1926–present
- Tourist routes: Lincoln Highway

Major junctions
- West end: US 30 in Fulton
- I-88 Toll / IL 110 (CKC) in Rock Falls; US 52 in Amboy; I-39 / US 51 in Paw Paw; US 34 in Montgomery; I-55 in Joliet; US 6 in Joliet; I-80 in New Lenox; US 45 in Frankfort; I-57 in Matteson; IL 394 in Ford Heights
- East end: US 30 in Lynwood

Location
- Country: United States
- State: Illinois
- Counties: Whiteside, Lee, DeKalb, Kane, Kendall, Will, Cook

Highway system
- United States Numbered Highway System; List; Special; Divided; Illinois State Highway System; Interstate; US; State; Tollways; Scenic
← IL 29	→ IL 31

U.S. Route 30 (US 30) is an east–west arterial surface road in northern Illinois. It runs from across the Mississippi River from Clinton, Iowa, to Lynwood at the Indiana state line. This is a distance of 153.79 miles (247.50 km).

== Route description ==
=== Mississippi River to I-39 ===
US 30 crosses from Clinton, Iowa, to the greater Fulton area over the Gateway Bridge. US 30 bypasses most of the city of Fulton to the south. From Fulton, US 30 travels southeastward through the town of Morrison en route to a crossing over the Rock River and Rock Falls. Here also, US 30 bypasses the majority of the town, intersecting Illinois Route 40 (IL 40) and having an interchange with Interstate 88 (I-88) on the southeast side of Rock Falls.

East of Rock Falls, US 30 turns directly eastward and intersects IL 26 well south of Dixon. It also intersects US 52 at a remote location north of Amboy in Lee County. US 30 remains rural continuing eastward, intersecting IL 251 a few miles west of I-39.

On the stretch of US 30 between Rock Falls and Shabbona, there are no notable population centers located on the highway. This is a distance of approximately 50 miles (80 km).

=== I-39 to Joliet ===
US 30 continues east of the I-39 interchange on a largely straight line through the towns of Shabbona, Waterman, and Hinckley. The proposed Prairie Parkway limited-access highway would have intersected US 30 east of Dauberman Road in the village of Big Rock, between Hinckley and Sugar Grove. In Sugar Grove at IL 47, the character of the road changes relatively quickly.

Near Aurora Municipal Airport in Sugar Grove, US 30 has an interchange with the western terminus of IL 56 and IL 47. US 30 exits south with IL 47 and remains concurrent for a couple of miles; US 30 then turns east at the Kendall–Kane county line. US 30 then intersects IL 31 and the Fox River and crosses over IL 25 in Montgomery but does not provide access to IL 25. East of Montgomery, US 30 overlaps US 34 for a short distance and then turns south-southeast to Plainfield, picking up the Lincoln Highway designation. Prior to the route being redrawn to follow the path of US 34, the route actually exited off of US 34 through a highway interchange. The interchange in Aurora at Hill Avenue, where the Lincoln Highway passes through Aurora toward the south, is where the route gains the designation and is where the old interchange was located as Hill Avenue passed over US 34 and continued south toward Plainfield.

US 30 passes a mile (1.6 km) to the north of downtown Plainfield on 143rd Street, then turns south onto IL 59 (Division Street) for approximately one mile (1.6 km). Southeast of downtown, US 30 leaves IL 59 and heads southeast toward Joliet.

US 30 intersects I-55 at a busy commercial center near Louis Joliet Mall in the far northwest corner of Joliet. A major construction project, begun in 2006, is in process to widen the remaining two-lane sections in this area to four lanes. A similar project was completed on other sections in far western Joliet and Crest Hill during the few years before.

US 30 intersects an east–west segment of IL 7 (Theodore Street) as it runs through the major commercial district of Crest Hill. It then continues southeast into the central part of the city of Joliet.

=== Joliet to the Indiana state line ===
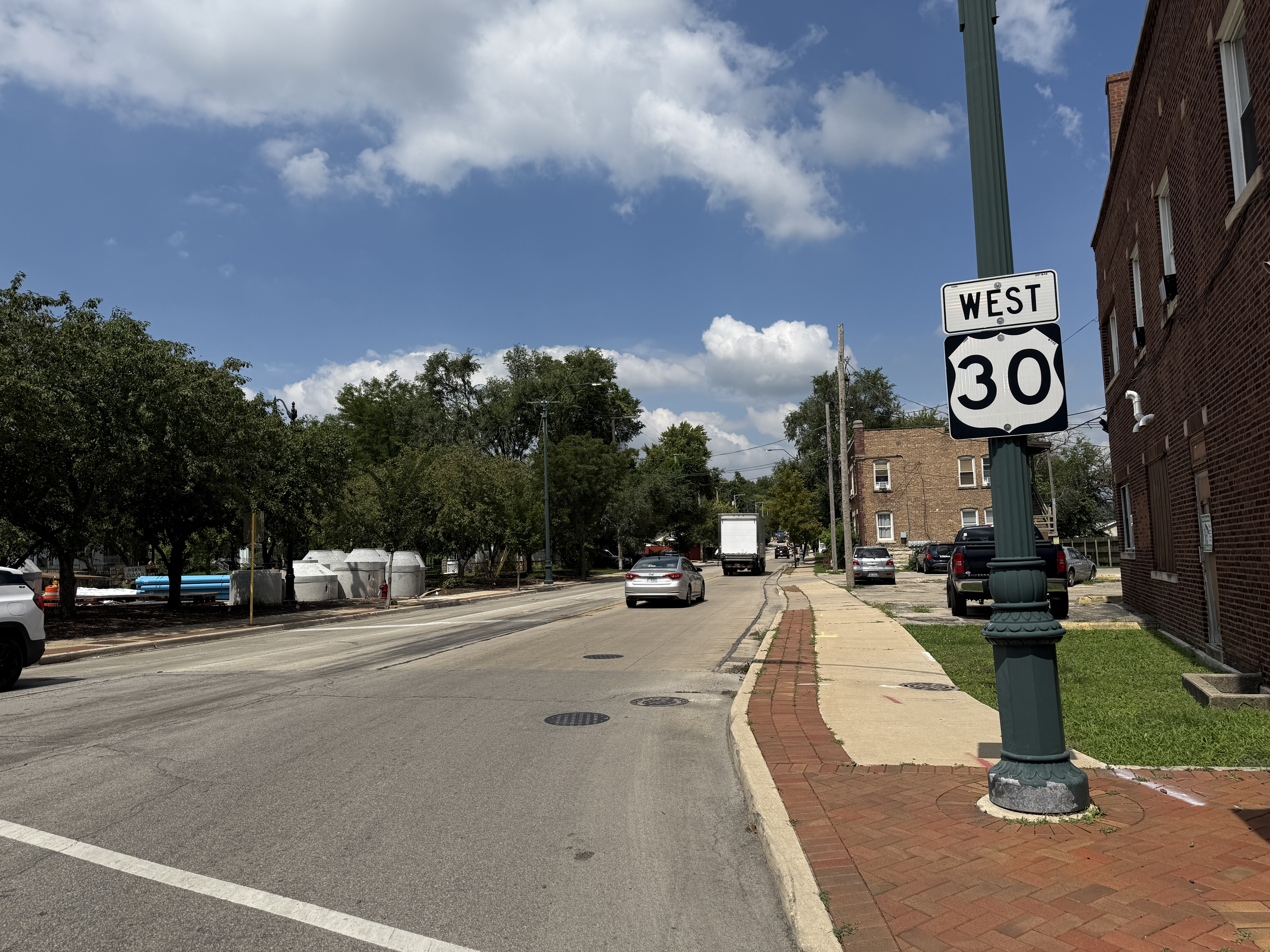
US 30 westbound in Joliet

Within Joliet, US 30 runs on Plainfield Road, then Center Street, where it splits onto Jefferson Street eastbound and Western Avenue/Cass Street westbound, concurrent with US 6 east of the Des Plaines River. The US 6/US 30 combination eastbound begins at Scott Street and ends at Collins Street; westbound, it starts at Collins and ends at Ottawa Street. There are also intersections at Scott and Ottawa streets with IL 53, which runs north–south through downtown Joliet. US 30 continues eastbound on Cass Street.

At I-80, US 30 is once again called the Lincoln Highway, running through the southern suburbs of New Lenox, Frankfort, Matteson, Chicago Heights, Ford Heights, and Lynwood. It intersects US 45 (La Grange Road), the southern terminus of IL 43 in Frankfort, I-57 in Matteson, IL 1 (Halsted Street) in Chicago Heights, IL 394 near Sauk Village, and the southern terminus of IL 83 in Lynwood.

West of I-80, US 30 generally has two lanes plus a center turn lane; east of I-80, the width of the road fluctuates between four and six lanes and is occasionally divided by a median. A 2003–2004 reconstruction project widened US 30 to four lanes between IL 394 and the Indiana state line. The point west of I-80 where US 30 widens to four lanes is the beginning of a very long stretch of road where US 30 stays at least four lanes; going eastward, US 30 does not narrow to two lanes again until just east of Canton, Ohio.

== History ==
US 30 in Illinois has undergone many major changes since its inception in 1926. It originally ran from Fulton (on the modern-day Mark Morris Memorial Bridge) through Chicago using current US 30, IL 2 east of Sterling to Dixon, and IL 38 from Dixon to Westchester (the full length of IL 38). It then followed Roosevelt Road, various city streets, Stony Island Avenue, and Torrence Avenue to reach Indiana.

In 1932, US 30 was relocated onto the Lincoln Highway in the southern suburbs, from Torrence Avenue to IL 31 in the Fox Valley. US 30 was then concurrent with current IL 31 (then called US 430) north to IL 38 in Geneva and kept the 1926 routing westward from Geneva. The old US 30 through Chicago became US 330. In the Fox River Valley, US 430 was created and ran north to Richmond from Geneva.

Between 1932 and 1942, US 30 was relocated west of Geneva to Sterling on a new, more direct road further south. US 330 was extended westward as US 30 was relocated south. In 1937, US 430 was dropped in favor of IL 31.

In 1942, US 330 was dropped entirely and became US 30 Alternate (US 30 Alt.), which lasted until 1971.

In June 1956, the Gateway Bridge opened south of the Lyons-Fulton Bridge. US 30 was rerouted south onto this bridge, and the old route named another US 30 Alt.—this was soon changed to IL 136 so as to match Iowa Highway 136 on the other side of the Mississippi River.

In 1959, US 30 was rerouted around Aurora. The old route through Aurora (present-day Galena Boulevard, New York Street, and Hill Avenue) became US 30 City; this lasted all of one year until 1960, when it was renamed US 30 Business (US 30 Bus.). US 30 Bus. lasted a little longer before being removed in 1970.

In 1963, the East-West Tollway was built. From 1963 to 1965, the tollway was marked as US 30 Toll and ran along modern-day I-88, I-294, and the present-day IL 394 (which in 1963 was called IL 1 until 1964, when it became IL 394). The East-West Tollway portion was renamed to IL 190 in 1965 and eventually became IL 5 before becoming I-88 in 1988.

In 1971, US 30 Alt. in Illinois was discontinued, renamed as IL 38 west of Westchester, and dropped through the city of Chicago.

Since a 2008 realignment, US 30 passes a mile (1.6 km) to the north of downtown Plainfield on 143rd Street, then turns south onto IL 59 (Division Street) for approximately one mile (1.6 km). Southeast of downtown, US 30 leaves IL 59 and heads southeast toward Joliet. Prior to 2008, US 30 ran directly through downtown Plainfield on Lockport Street, briefly sharing alignment with IL 126, before joining IL 59 for three blocks.

== Major intersections ==
County	Location	mi	km	Destinations	Notes
Mississippi River		0.0	0.0	US 30 west – Clinton	Continuation into Iowa
Mississippi River		0.0	0.0	Gateway Bridge; Iowa–Illinois state line	
Whiteside	Garden Plain Township			Fulton	Right-in/right-out interchange
Whiteside	Fulton	1.4	2.3	IL 84 / Great River Road (Waller Road) – Fulton, Savanna, East Moline	
Whiteside	Fulton Township	4.0	6.4	IL 136 west (Fulton Road) / Lincoln Highway – Fulton	Eastern terminus of IL 136
Whiteside	Union Grove Township	11.2	18.0	IL 78 north (Carroll Road) – Mount Carroll	Western end of IL 78 overlap
Whiteside	Morrison	12.7	20.4	IL 78 south (Cherry Street) – Prophetstown	Eastern end of IL 78 concurrency
Whiteside	Hopkins Township			Lincoln Highway (Emerson Road)	
Whiteside	Hopkins Township	23.0	37.0	To I-88 / IL 110 (CKC)	
Whiteside	Coloma Township	27.8	44.7	IL 40 (1st Avenue) – Sterling, Peoria	
Whiteside	Coloma–Montmorency township line	30.7	49.4	I-88 west (Ronald Reagan Memorial Highway) / IL 110 (CKC) west – Moline, Rock Island I-88 Toll east (Ronald Reagan Memorial Tollway) / IL 110 (CKC) east – Chicago	I-88 exit 44
Lee	South Dixon–Marion township line	39.9	64.2	IL 26 – Dixon, Princeton	
Lee	Franklin Grove–Amboy township line	46.6	75.0	US 52 – Dixon, Amboy, Mendota	
Lee	Viola Township	59.2	95.3	IL 251 – Rochelle, Mendota	
Lee	Willow Creek Township	63.0	101.4	I-39 / US 51 – Rockford, LaSalle, Peru	I-39 exit 87
DeKalb	Waterman	76.4	123.0	IL 23 – DeKalb, Ottawa	
DeKalb	Hinckley	81.7	131.5	CR 10 (Somonauk Road)	
Kane–DeKalb county line	Big Rock Township	84.3	135.7	CR 24 east (County Line Road)	
Kane	Big Rock	86.9	139.9	CR 44 north (Davis Road)	
Kane	Big Rock	88.1	141.8	CR 62 north (Dauberman Road)	
Kane	Sugar Grove	92.5	148.9	IL 47 north – Elburn IL 56 east to I-88 Toll east / IL 110 (CKC) east – Aurora, Chicago	Interchange; western end of IL 47 concurrency; western terminus of IL 56
Kane	Sugar Grove	95.1	153.0	CR 24 (Jericho Road)	
Kane–Kendall county line	Yorkville	95.5	153.7	IL 47 south (Bridge Street)	Eastern end of IL 47 concurrency
Kane–Kendall county line	Montgomery	99.0	159.3	CR 20 south / CR 83 north (Orchard Road)	
Kane	Montgomery	100.5	161.7	IL 31 (Lake Street) – Montgomery, Aurora, Oswego	Interchange
Kendall	Montgomery–Oswego line	103.8	167.0	US 34 west (Walter Payton Memorial Highway)	Western end of US 34 concurrency
Kendall	Montgomery	104.2	167.7	US 34 east (Ogden Avenue) / Lincoln Highway (Hill Avenue)	Eastern end of US 34 concurrency
Will	Plainfield	112.7	181.4	IL 59 north (Division Street)	Western end of IL 59 concurrency
Will	Plainfield	113.4	182.5	IL 126 / Historic US 66 east (Main Street) – Chicago, Yorkville	
Will	Plainfield	113.9	183.3	IL 59 south / Historic US 66 west (Division Street, PFC Andrew Meari Memorial Highway)	Eastern end of IL 59 concurrency
Will	Joliet	116.2	187.0	I-55 (Barack Obama Presidential Expressway) – Chicago, Bloomington	I-55 exit 257
Will	Crest Hill–Joliet line	119.5	192.3	IL 7 (Theodore Street)	
Will	Joliet	122.5	197.1	US 6 west / Historic US 66 west / IL 53 south (Ottawa Street)	One-way couplet
Will	Joliet	122.6	197.3	US 6 east / Historic US 66 east / IL 53 north (Scott Street)	One-way couplet; western end of US 6 concurrency
Will	Joliet	123.2	198.3	US 6 east (Collins Street)	Eastern end of US 6 concurrency
Will	New Lenox	127.6	205.4	I-80 – Moline, Rock Island, Gary, Indiana	I-80 exit 137
Will	Frankfort	136.2	219.2	US 45 (La Grange Road)	
Will–Cook county line	Frankfort–Matteson line	139.2	224.0	IL 43 north (Harlem Avenue)	Southern terminus of IL 43
Cook	Matteson	141.7	228.0	I-57 – Chicago, Kankakee	I-57 exit 340
Cook	Matteson	142.2	228.8	IL 50 (Cicero Avenue)	
Cook	Chicago Heights	147.0	236.6	IL 1 (Chicago Road)	
Cook	Ford Heights	150.3	241.9	IL 394 (Calumet Expressway) – Chicago, Danville	
Cook	Lynwood	152.5	245.4	IL 83 north (Glenwood Dyer Road)	Southern terminus of IL 83
Cook	Lynwood	153.79	247.50	US 30 east / Lincoln Highway – Valparaiso	Continuation into Indiana
1.000 mi = 1.609 km; 1.000 km = 0.621 mi: Concurrency terminus

U.S. Route 30
Previous state: Iowa	Illinois	Next state: Indiana

Lincoln Highway
Previous state: Iowa	Illinois	Next state: Indiana
