= Coloma Township =

Coloma Township may refer to the following places in the United States:

- Coloma Township, Whiteside County, Illinois
- Coloma Charter Township, Michigan
