= Iowa Highway 136 =

State highway in Iowa

Iowa Highway 136
- Iowa 136 highlighted in red

Route information
- Maintained by Iowa DOT

Major junctions
- South end: IL 136 at the Illinois state line in Clinton
- US 67 / Great River Road in Clinton; US 61 near Delmar; US 151 in Cascade
- North end: US 20 / US 52 in Dyersville

Location
- Country: United States
- State: Iowa
- Counties: Clinton, Jones, Dubuque

Highway system
- Iowa Primary Highway System; Interstate; US; State; Secondary; Scenic
← US 136	→ Iowa 137

Iowa Highway 136 (Iowa 136) is a state highway maintained by the Iowa Department of Transportation. It runs for 87.611 miles (140.996 km) in eastern Iowa. It begins at the Mississippi River in Clinton on the Mark Morris Memorial Bridge, where it continues as Illinois Route 136. It ends at an interchange with U.S. Highway 20 (US 20) and US 52 in Dyersville. Although signed as a north–south highway throughout, the highway runs east to west between Clinton and Oxford Junction, while turning north at Oxford Junction to complete its run to Dyersville. For most of its existence, Iowa 136 connected Clinton and Luxemburg. During the 1950s-1960s, the northern and southern ends of the route shifted slightly because nearby United States highways changed their alignments. The northern end of Iowa 136 shifted again in early 2022.

== Route description ==
Iowa Highway 136 begins on the Mark Morris Memorial Bridge over the Mississippi River at Clinton. It descends the approach to the bridge and intersects U.S. Highway 67 (US 67), which is running along N. Second Street. It turns to the north, overlapping US 67 for 3/4 mile (1.2 km) until US 67 splits away at N. Third Street. From US 67, Iowa 136 goes west along Main Avenue and leaves town enters rural Clinton County. It heads to the north-northwest for 10 miles (16 km) towards Goose Lake along a narrow, curving stretch of road.

From Goose Lake, Iowa 136 continues to the west towards Delmar for 15 miles (24 km), passing through Charlotte along the way. Three miles (4.8 km) west of Delmar, it meets U.S. Highway 61 at a diamond interchange. This interchange is adjacent to the 61 Drive In outdoor movie theatre. It continues west through the small communities of Elwood and Lost Nation, before reaching Oxford Junction.

At Oxford Junction, Iowa 136 turns to the north and travels 7 miles (11 km) to Wyoming, where it meets Iowa Highway 64. For one mile (1.6 km), Iowa 64 and Iowa 136 overlap each other through Wyoming. On the western edge of the community, Iowa 136 splits away and travels north towards Onslow. North of Onslow, it passes through rural Jones County for 15 miles (24 km), crossing the Maquoketa River, before reaching Cascade and U.S. Route 151.

Now in Dubuque County, Iowa 136 crosses the North Fork Maquoketa River and heads northwest towards Worthington. Five miles (8.0 km) later, it meets U.S. Highway 20 and U.S. Highway 52 at a partial cloverleaf interchange south of Dyersville. Prior to 2022, US 52 continued with Iowa 136 toward Luxemburg.

== History ==
In 1926, when Primary Road No. 20 (PR 20) was renamed U.S. Highway 61, Primary Road No. 61, which connected Clinton to US 61 west of Delmar, was renumbered Primary Road No. 136. In 1930, Iowa Iowa 136 had been extended west and north to what is now Iowa 64, replacing Iowa 153. Iowa 136 extended north to Onslow in 1931, and to Cascade in 1935. In 1938, Iowa 136 had been extended to Luxemburg, replacing Iowa 188. By 1947, only the PR 61 section of road and another section between Wyoming and Oxford Junction had been paved. In Clinton, Iowa 136 originally began at the N. Third Street intersection with U.S. Highway 67. After U.S. Highway 30 was rerouted over the Gateway Bridge in 1955, Iowa 136 was extended to cross the Mississippi River over the Lyons-Fulton Bridge. A year later, an Alternate U.S. Route 30 was designated over the old alignment of US 30 through Clinton, and Iowa 136 was pulled back to its old end. In 1967, the Alternate US 30 designation was dropped and Iowa 136 again crossed the river.

From 1963 to 1967, U.S. Highway 52 was realigned from Dubuque to Luxemburg to follow U.S. Highway 20 to Dyersville and Iowa 136 to Luxemburg while its original alignment was rebuilt. During this time, Iowa 136 was truncated back to US 20 at Dyersville, but it was redesignated along this segment after US 52 returned to its old alignment. Shortly after completion of the Southwest Arterial in Dubuque and subsequent rerouting of US 52 in 2021, Iowa 136 was truncated again back to US 20 in Dyersville.

== Major intersections ==
County	Location	mi	km	Destinations	Notes
Mississippi River		0.000	0.000	IL 136 east / Lincoln Highway – Fulton	Continuation in Illinois
Mississippi River		0.000	0.000	Mark Morris Memorial Bridge	
Clinton	Clinton	0.465	0.748	US 67 / Great River Road south (N. 2nd Street) / Lincoln Highway Heritage Byway	Southern end of US 67 overlap
Clinton	Clinton	1.123	1.807	US 67 / Great River Road north (N. 3rd Street)	Northern end of US 67 overlap
Clinton	Delmar	30.427	48.968	US 61 – Maquoketa, DeWitt	
Jones	Wyoming	53.962	86.843	Iowa 64 east (Main Street) – Maquoketa	Southern end of Iowa 64 overlap
Jones	Wyoming	54.924	88.392	Iowa 64 west (Main Street) – Anamosa	Northern end of Iowa 64 overlap
Dubuque	Cascade	73.528	118.332	US 151 – Cedar Rapids, Dubuque	
Dubuque	Dyersville	87.611	140.996	US 20 / US 52 south – Waterloo, Dubuque US 52 north – Decorah	New northern end; former southern end of US 52 overlap
Dubuque	Luxemburg	97.733	157.286	US 52 north (Andre Street) / Iowa 3 (Main Street) – Guttenberg, Colesburg, Dubuque	Former northern end; former northern end of US 52 overlap
1.000 mi = 1.609 km; 1.000 km = 0.621 mi: Closed/former; Concurrency terminus
