= John R. Boyle House =

Historic house in Iowa, United States

- U.S. National Register of Historic Places
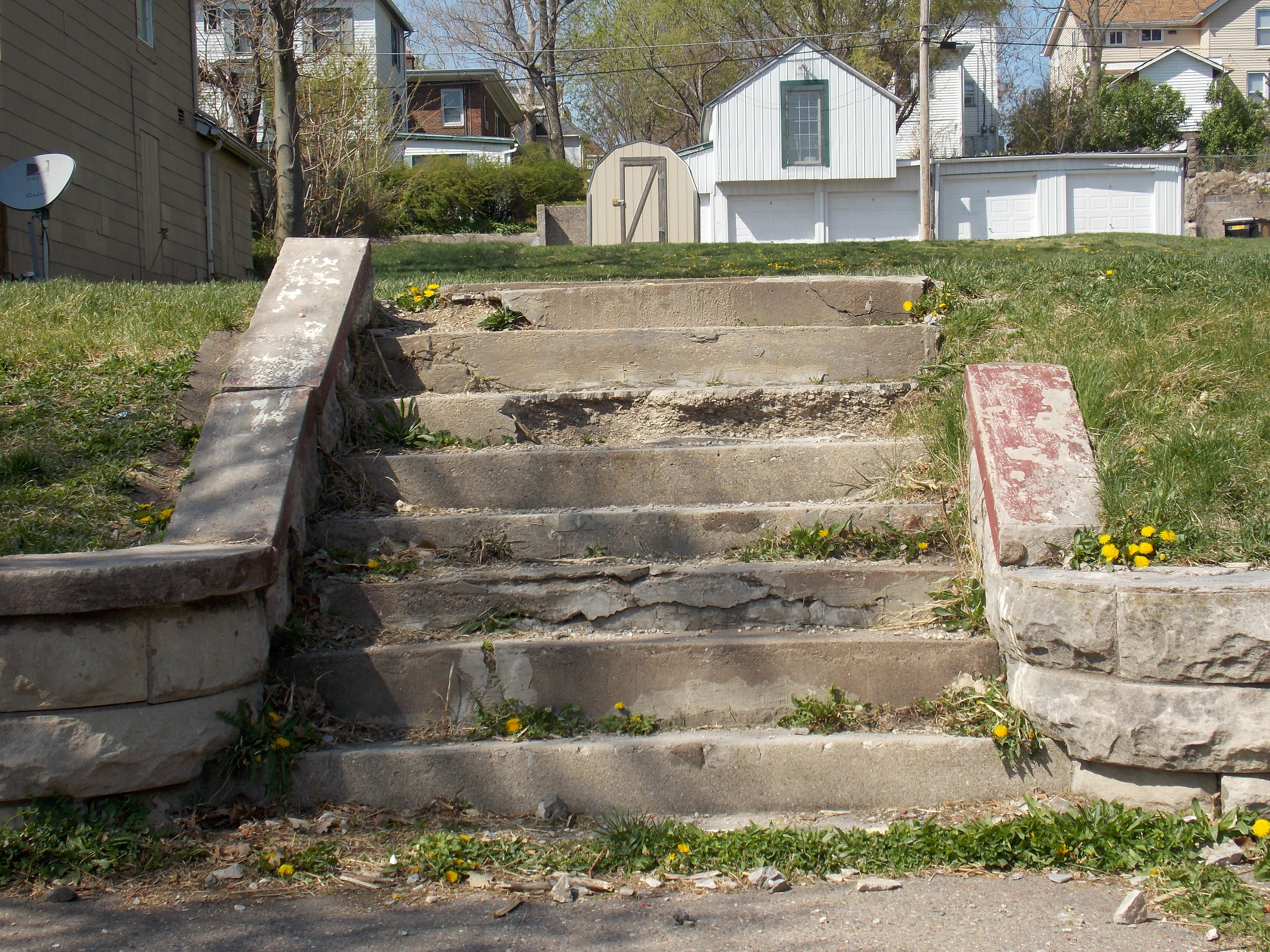
- The steps from in front of where the house was located

- Location within Iowa Location within the United States
- Location: 408 E. 6th St. Davenport, Iowa
- Coordinates: 41°31′33″N 90°34′10″W
- Area: less than one acre
- Built: 1866
- Architectural style: Italianate
- MPS: Davenport MRA
- NRHP reference No.: 83002403
- Added to NRHP: July 7, 1983

The John R. Boyle House was a historic building located on the east side of Davenport, Iowa, United States. It was listed on the National Register of Historic Places in 1983, and has subsequently been torn down.

== History ==
John R. Boyle was a railroad contractor who built sections of the Mississippi and Missouri Railroad, which became part of the Chicago, Rock Island and Pacific Railroad. He also worked on the Chicago and North Western Railway and the Union Pacific Railroad. He built this house not far from the railroad tracks in 1865–1866, shortly after moving to Davenport. Boyle moved to a farm north of the city in 1877. He died in 1895.

== Architecture ==
The Boyle House was typical of Davenport's Italianate houses while at the same time, it made its own personal architectural statement. The two-story brick structure was built on a stone foundation. It featured a square form, a shallow roof, and bracketed eaves. The door and window treatments were what made this a unique dwelling. Here it featured segmental and Tudor arches along with openings with chamfered corners. There was a small projecting bay on the west side of the house with flat arches. It also had a front porch that had been removed at some point.
