= Illinois Route 136 =

State highway in Whiteside County, Illinois, US

Illinois Route 136
- IL 136 highlighted in red

Route information
- Maintained by IDOT
- Length: 3.22 mi (5.18 km)
- Existed: 1967–present
- Tourist routes: Lincoln Highway

Major junctions
- West end: Iowa 136 in Fulton
- IL 84 in Fulton
- East end: US 30 east of Fulton

Location
- Country: United States
- State: Illinois
- Counties: Whiteside

Highway system
- Illinois State Highway System; Interstate; US; State; Tollways; Scenic
← US 136	→ IL 137

Illinois Route 136 (IL 136) is an east–west state highway in northwestern Illinois. It runs from the Mark Morris Memorial Bridge over the Mississippi River, connecting to Iowa Highway 136 in Clinton, Iowa, east to U.S. Route 30 (US 30) east of Fulton. This is a distance of 3.22 miles (5.18 km).

== Route description ==
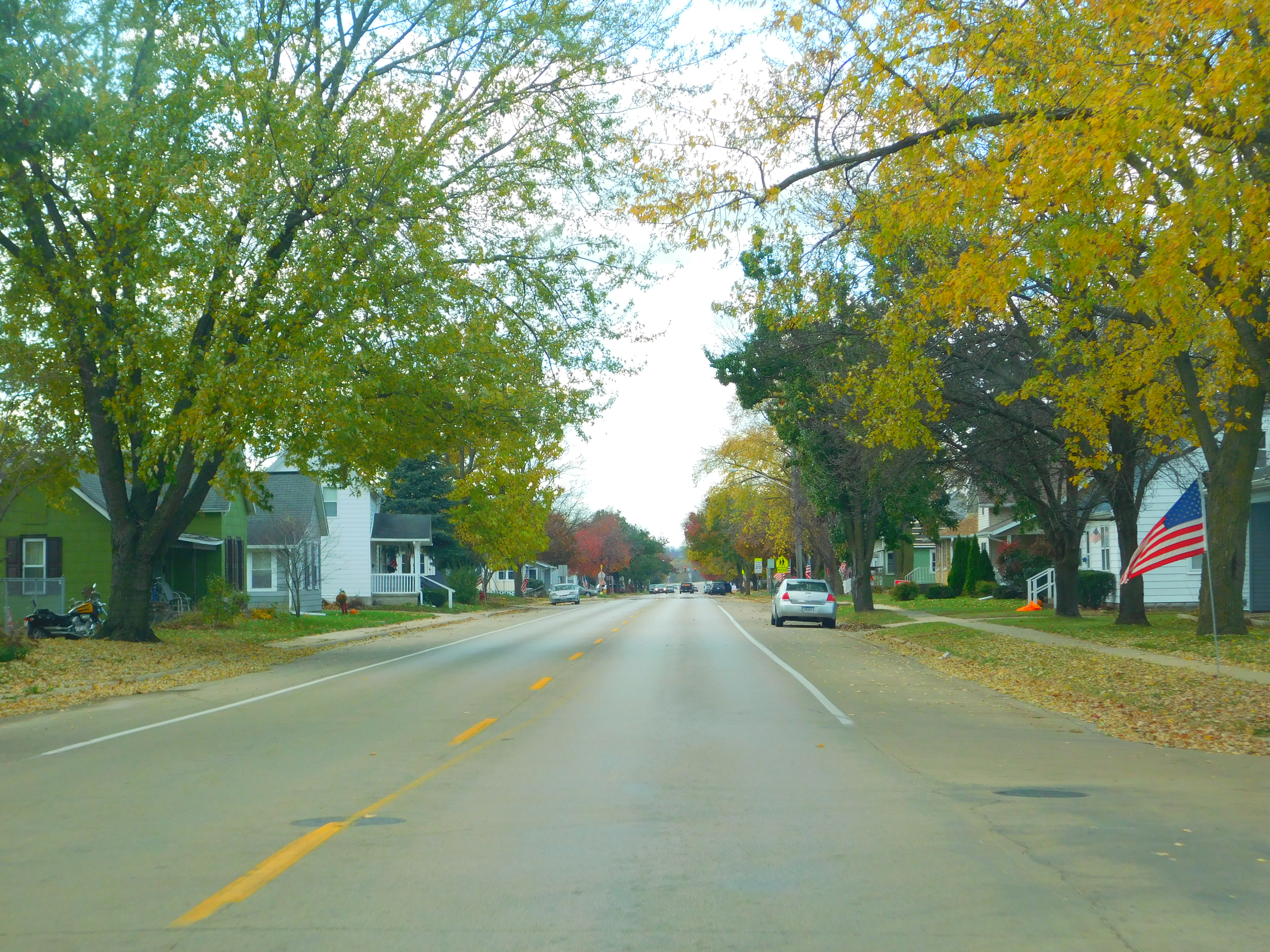
IL 136 through Fulton

IL 136 is a two-lane surface road for its entire length. The highway begins at the Mark Morris Memorial Bridge, which connects to Iowa Highway 136 in Clinton, Iowa. At the foot of the bridge is a signal-controlled intersection with 4th Street in Fulton, which is signed as the Lincoln Highway. IL 136 continues east along 14th Avenue, a residential street dotted by churches and businesses. On the eastern edge of Fulton, IL 136 intersects IL 84. The final two miles (3.2 km) of IL 136, which run along Fulton Road, are part of the Lincoln Highway and are signed as such. IL 136 ends at an intersection with US 30.

== History ==
SBI Route 136 originally traveled from IL 1 to the village of Flat Rock in rural Crawford County, a distance of about 3,000 feet (910 m). In the meantime, the Lyons–Fulton Bridge was numbered US 30 through 1957, and US 30 Alternate (US 30 Alt.) through 1967. After 1967, the bridge and road to US 30 were changed to IL 136. In 1975, the Lyons–Fulton Bridge closed and was replaced by the Mark Morris Memorial Bridge located one-half mile (800 m) downstream. The spur to Flat Rock was left unnumbered.

== Major intersections ==
The entire route is in Whiteside County.

Location	mi	km	Destinations	Notes
Mississippi River	0.00	0.00	Iowa 136 north / Lincoln Highway Heritage Byway west	Continuation into Iowa; historic Lincoln Highway
Mississippi River	0.00	0.00	Mark Morris Memorial Bridge; Iowa–Illinois state line	
Fulton	0.38	0.61	Lincoln Highway east (4th Street; CR 36)	Eastern end of Lincoln Highway overlap
Fulton	1.33	2.14	IL 84 / Great River Road (National Route) (Waller Road) / Lincoln Highway west	Western end of Lincoln Highway overlap
Fulton Township	3.22	5.18	US 30 / Lincoln Highway east – Clinton, Iowa, Morrison	Eastern end of Lincoln Highway overlap
1.000 mi = 1.609 km; 1.000 km = 0.621 mi: Concurrency terminus
