= Clinton Railroad Bridge =

Bridge in Iowa and Illinois, US

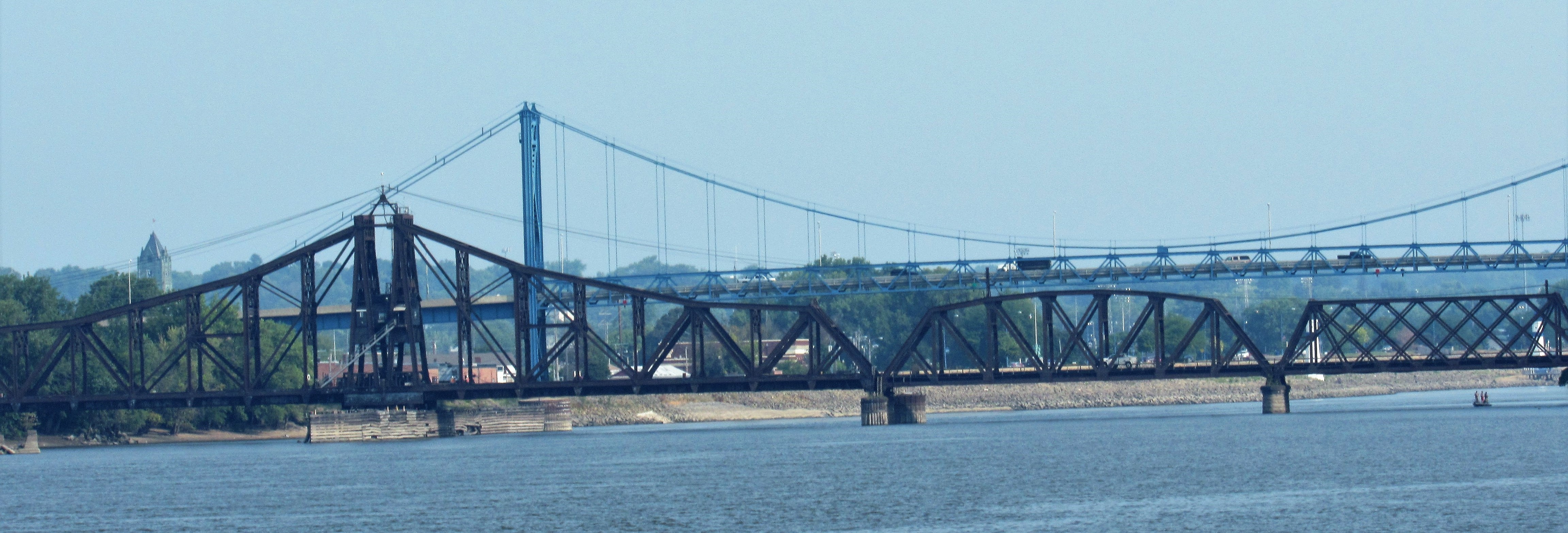
- The Clinton Railroad Bridge in 2018
- Coordinates: 41°50′11″N 90°11′05″W
- Carries: Double railroad track
- Crosses: Mississippi River
- Locale: Clinton, Iowa, and Fulton, Illinois
- Owner: Union Pacific Railroad

Characteristics
- Design: Swing bridge
- Total length: 855 m (2,805 ft)
- Longest span: 460 m (1,509 ft)

Rail characteristics
- No. of tracks: 2

History
- Constructed by: Pennsylvania Steel Company
- Construction start: 1901
- Construction end: 1907
- Construction cost: $1 million
- Opened: 1909

Statistics
- Daily traffic: 42.9 trains per day (as of 2014)

Location
- Interactive map of Clinton Railroad Bridge

The Clinton Railroad Bridge, also called the Chicago and Northwestern Railway Bridge or more simply the Clinton Bridge, is a bridge that carries double tracked rail lines across the Mississippi River between Clinton, Iowa, and Fulton (Albany), Illinois. The bridge is a truss bridge with a swing span crossing the main river channel and is adjacent to the Gateway Bridge. The original bridge was constructed in 1858, and the first train crossed the bridge on January 19, 1860. The bridge was the second railroad crossing over the Mississippi River. In 1870, the bridge was declared a post route, therefore stopping the occupation of steamboats and approval of railroads. From 1859 to 1908, the mileage in operation increased from 28,789 to 229,230, prompting the Chicago and North Western Railway to replace the bridge with a new structure in 1900.

The current bridge was built by the Pennsylvania Steel Company. Construction of the new bridge was planned in 1901, and on February 7, 1907, Congress authorized its construction. Construction of the bridge ended in 1907, and the bridge opened in 1909. During that year, the first train crossed the new bridge, and the old bridge was taken down. There are still piers from predecessor bridges next to the current bridge. Through its purchase of Chicago and North Western Railway in 1995, Union Pacific Railroad is the current owner of the bridge. There are possibilities that the current bridge would be replaced. The bridge was listed as “hazard to navigation” by United States Coast Guard in 1996 and by the Iowa Department of Transportation in 2009. In preparation of a replacement bridge, a new depot was purchased in 2017 and new land were purchased in 2018. During December 2020, the Illinois Department of Resources gave notice that a new bridge was planned to begin construction in 2021 with demolition of the existing one to occur in 2025.

== Description ==
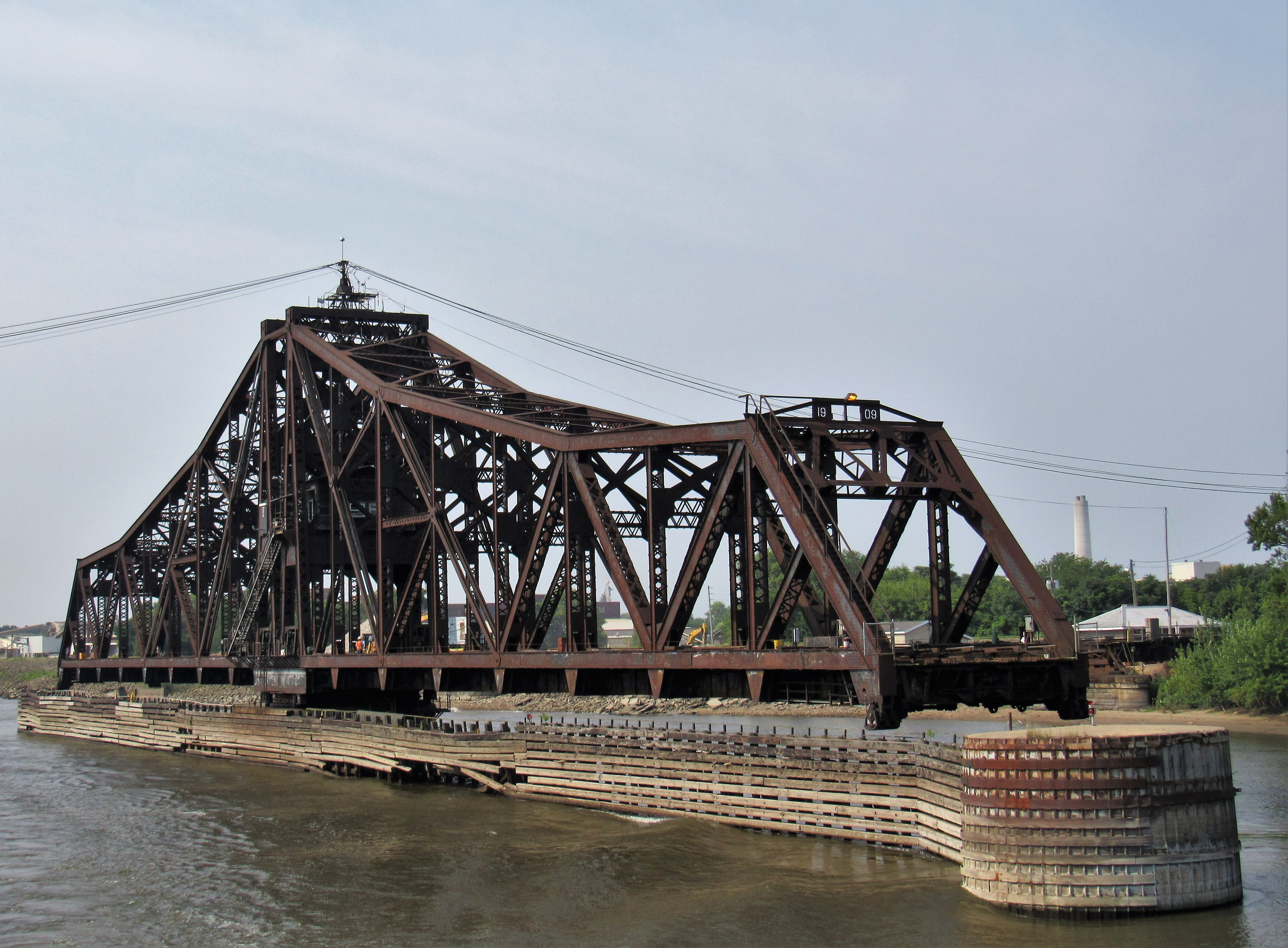
The swing span of the Clinton Railroad Bridge in 2018.

The Clinton Railroad Bridge is a two-tracked swing Parker truss bridge with a 460-foot (140 m) swing span and an overall length of 855 m (2,805 ft). This bridge contains four spans: a swing span, a deck girder span, a Parker through truss span, and a quadrangular truss span. The bridge's vertical clearance is 18.7 ft (5.7 m), and has estimate of 15 m (49 ft) above ground. At the end of the swing span is a Warren-style truss configuration, and the tower portion of the bridge has a very narrow appearance.

== History ==
=== Original bridge (1864–1909) ===
==== Planning ====
In 1835, a former riverboat pilot, Elijah Buell, along with his business partner, John Baker, located a ferry service at a place north of the current bridge location called "the Narrows." Baker established himself on the Illinois side of the river, and Buell settled on the Iowa side. Baker's settlement eventually became the City of Fulton, Illinois. Buell's settlement was chartered by Buell and three partners (George Harlan, Dennis Warren, and Chalkey Hoag) in 1837 as Lyons, Iowa, named for the city of the same name in France. Because of the popularity of the river ferry, both Fulton and Lyons grew very rapidly.

In 1852, citizens of Lyons learnt that a new railroad would be built westward of Iowa, which led to possibilities of a Mississippi River railroad crossing between Lyons and Fulton. The Iowa Land Company was organized in 1855 with the announcement that a railroad crossing was to be attempted south of Lyons and Fulton. The land company bought Bartlett's holdings on the Iowa side of the river and re-platted them under the name Clinton, Iowa, in honor of the Governor of New York, DeWitt Clinton. The Chicago, Iowa, and Nebraska (C&IN) Railroad Company was formed to effect the railroad crossing at Little Rock Island, between the new city of Clinton and the village of Albany, Illinois. However, C&IN went bankrupt in 1862, and was later purchased by the Cedar Rapids and Missouri River Railroad.

==== Construction ====
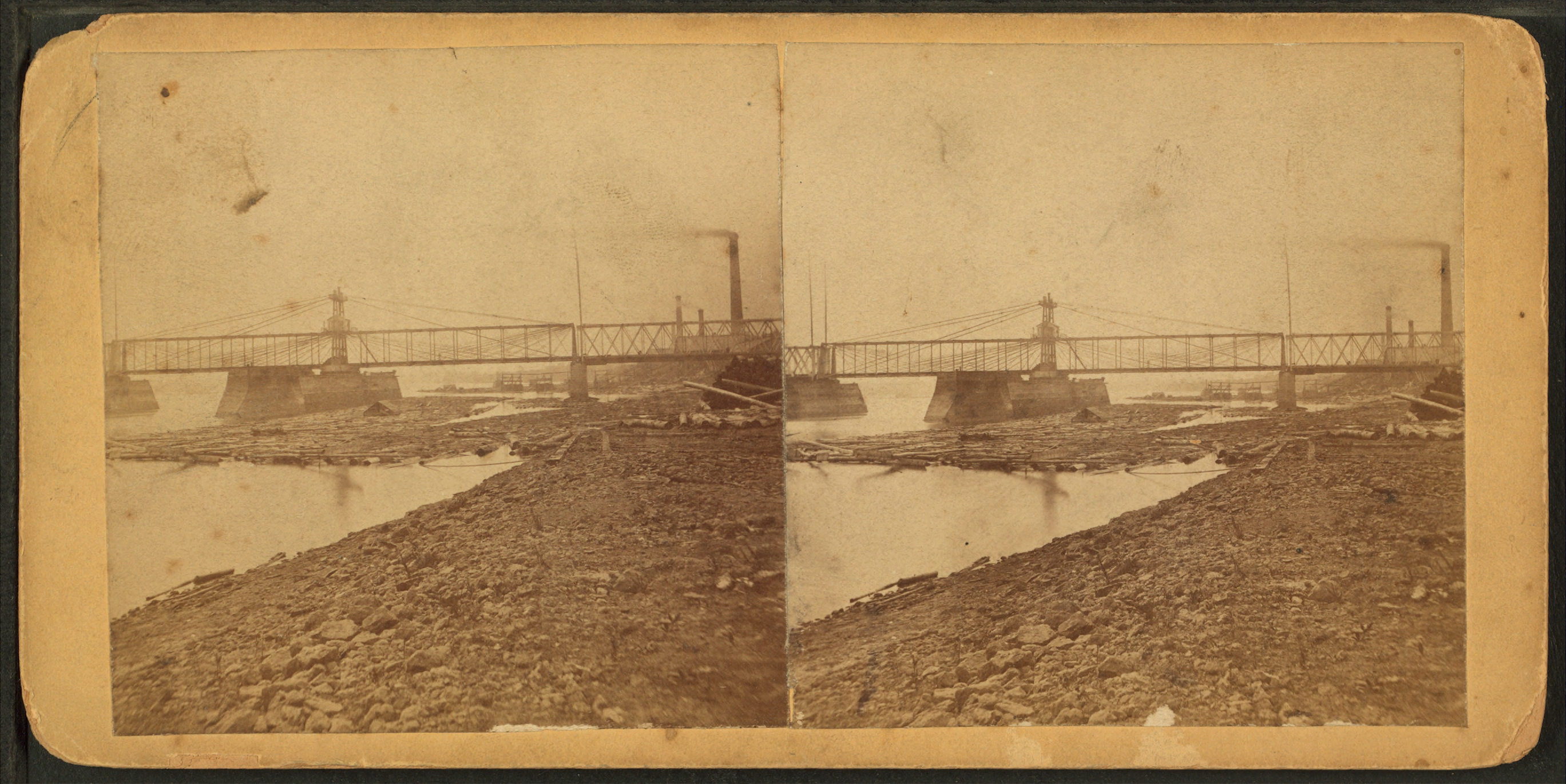
Stereoscope of the old bridge

In 1858, Chicago, Iowa & Nebraska Railroad began construction of the bridge. On January 15, 1859, the first piers for the bridge was driven and on December 14 that year, the last span was dropped. The first railroad bridge at Clinton was declared open for operation at noon on January 19, 1860, as the first train crossed the bridge. It would be the second railway crossing over the entire Mississippi River. However, the entire span was not yet complete, and railway cars had to be ferried across the main channel of the river between Little Rock Island and the Iowa shoreline.

The final segment of the original span was completed in 1864, the same year that the C&IN merged with the Galena & Chicago Union Railroad to form the Chicago and North Western (C&NW) Railroad. This company operated the bridge, and its successor, the current bridge, constructed in 1907, until the Union Pacific Railway Company purchased the C&NW in 1995. The bridge was completed on January 6, 1865, and the first Chicago freight train crossed it six days later. The bridge's total length was 3,750 ft (1,143 m), and its draw span was 300 ft (91 m) long.

From the beginning of its construction, the Clinton Railroad Bridge was the subject of several lawsuits brought by river steamboat operators. In 1870, a third lawsuit was settled by the United States Supreme Court in favor of the railroad. The bridge was declared a post route, therefore stopping the occupation of steamboats and approval of railroads. The mileage in operation increased from 28,789 in 1859 to 229,230 in 1908, with more than 150 trains using the bridge on some days, prompted the Chicago and North Western Railroad to replace the bridge with a new structure in 1900. The old bridge was torn down in 1909.

== Current bridge (1907–present) ==
Planning for construction on the new bridge began in 1901. On February 6, 1907, Congress authorized construction of the new bridge. On May 4 of that year, the secretary of war approved plans for it. During the time of construction, the draw span was one of the largest spans on the Mississippi River. On March 21, 1907, a formal order authorized the necessary expenditures for the bridge. On May 18, 1907, a contract for the entire sub-structure was entered, which was made for erection of the slough spans and east channel spans. In February 1908, a contract for constructing the west channel spans was made. The new bridge opened in 1909, and in late winter during that year, the first train crossed the bridge. The cost for the new bridge was $1 million.

In October 1958, the bridge caught on fire and suffered $250,000 in loss. In June 1959, the bridge suffered another fire, but the damage was slight. The cause of the blaze was not determined, but firefighters said that 25 ties were damaged by heat and would need to be replaced. On August 7, 2007, eleven coal cars derailed on the bridge. The train was traveling from Wyoming to Illinois. The bridge reopened on Wednesday August 8, 2007.

=== Future replacement ===
There has been possibilities that the current Clinton Railroad Bridge may be replaced. In 1996, the United States Coast Guard listed the bridge as a "hazard to navigation", and this declaration helped put the bridge on track for replacement once federal funds would be available to do it. During that year, the Coast Guard issued an order to "alter the bridge" to the Union Pacific and cited it as an "unreasonable obstruction to navigation". In a 2009 report, the Iowa Department of Transportation described the bridge as a "persistent hazard to navigation that causes a significant loss of America's economic competitiveness due to delays it creates". In 2013, Union Pacific planned to build a new $400 million span bridge to replace the current one. In 2017, Union Pacific purchased a depot in preparation for a new railroad bridge. In 2018, Union Pacific purchased new land near the Garden Plain Township in Illinois.

== See also ==
- List of crossings of the Upper Mississippi River
