= Fulton Commercial Historic District =

Historic district in Illinois, United States

- U.S. National Register of Historic Places
- U.S. Historic district
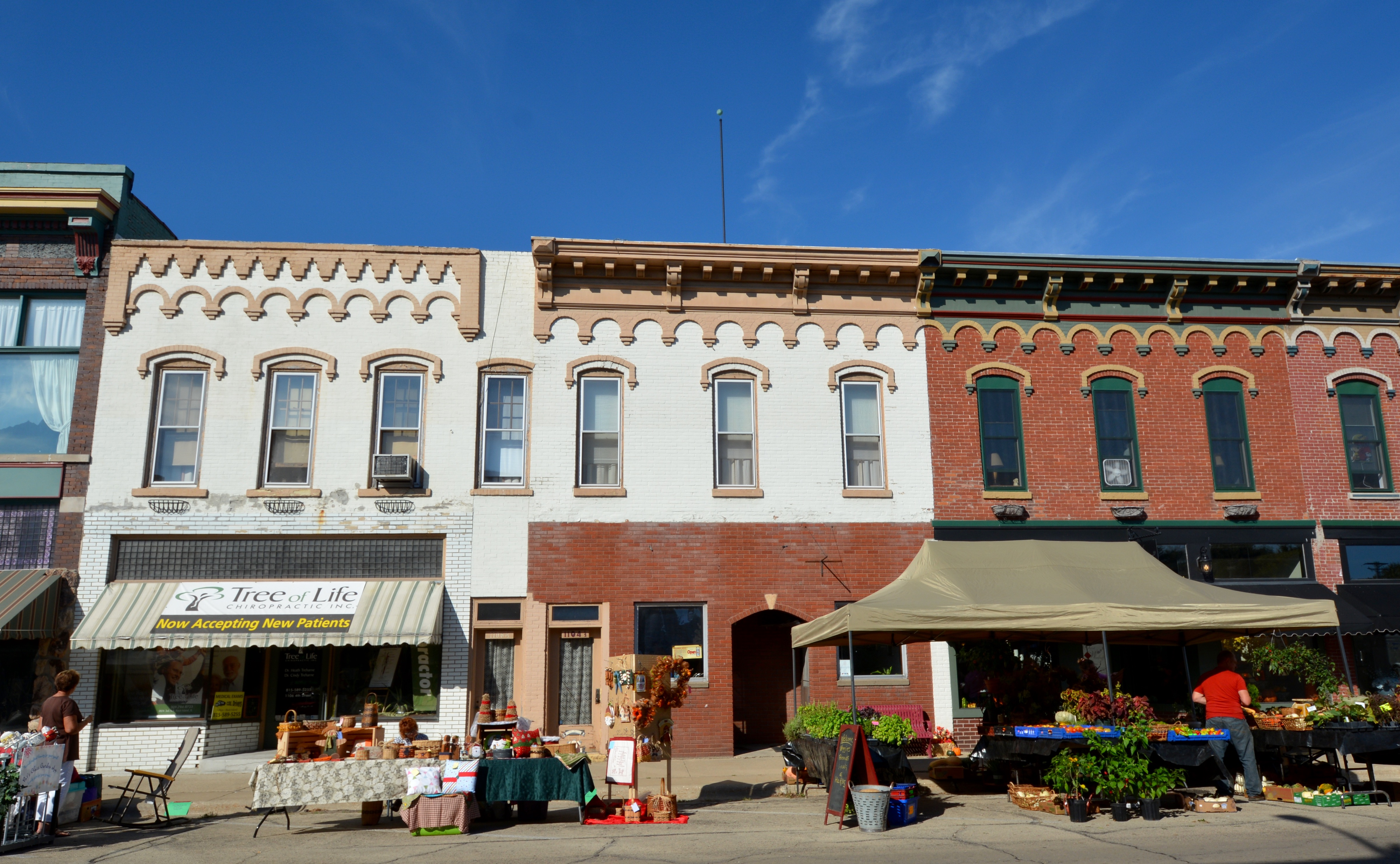

- Location within Illinois Location within the United States
- Location: 4th St. between 10th & 12th Aves., Fulton, Illinois
- Coordinates: 41°47′21″N 89°41′37″W
- NRHP reference No.: 12000062
- Added to NRHP: March 7, 2012

The Fulton Commercial Historic District is a national historic district located along 4th Street in downtown Fulton, Illinois. The district includes 31 contributing buildings as well as a war memorial and World War II gun; most of the buildings were historically used for commercial purposes. The earliest buildings in the district date to 1856, within the same decade as Fulton's incorporation and the opening of its first railroad; the most recent, the city's fire station, was completed in 1956. The buildings completed prior to 1900, which make up roughly half of the district, primarily feature Italianate designs; noteworthy examples of the style include the Utz Block and the building at 1011-1013 4th Street. The district's 20th century buildings include examples of the Commercial, Classical Revival, and Modern styles.

The district was added to the National Register of Historic Places on March 7, 2012.
