= Illinois Route 126 =

State highway in northern Illinois, US

Illinois Route 126
- IL 126 highlighted in red

Route information
- Maintained by IDOT
- Length: 17.25 mi (27.76 km)
- Existed: 1934–present

Major junctions
- West end: IL 47 in Yorkville
- US 30 / IL 59 in Plainfield
- East end: I-55 near Bolingbrook

Location
- Country: United States
- State: Illinois
- Counties: Kendall, Will

Highway system
- Illinois State Highway System; Interstate; US; State; Tollways; Scenic
← IL 125	→ IL 127
← US 66	→ US 67

Illinois Route 126 (IL 126) is a 17.25-mile-long (27.76 km) east–west state highway in the northern part of the U.S. state of Illinois. It travels from IL 47 in Yorkville to Interstate 55 (I-55) between Plainfield and Bolingbrook.

== Route description ==
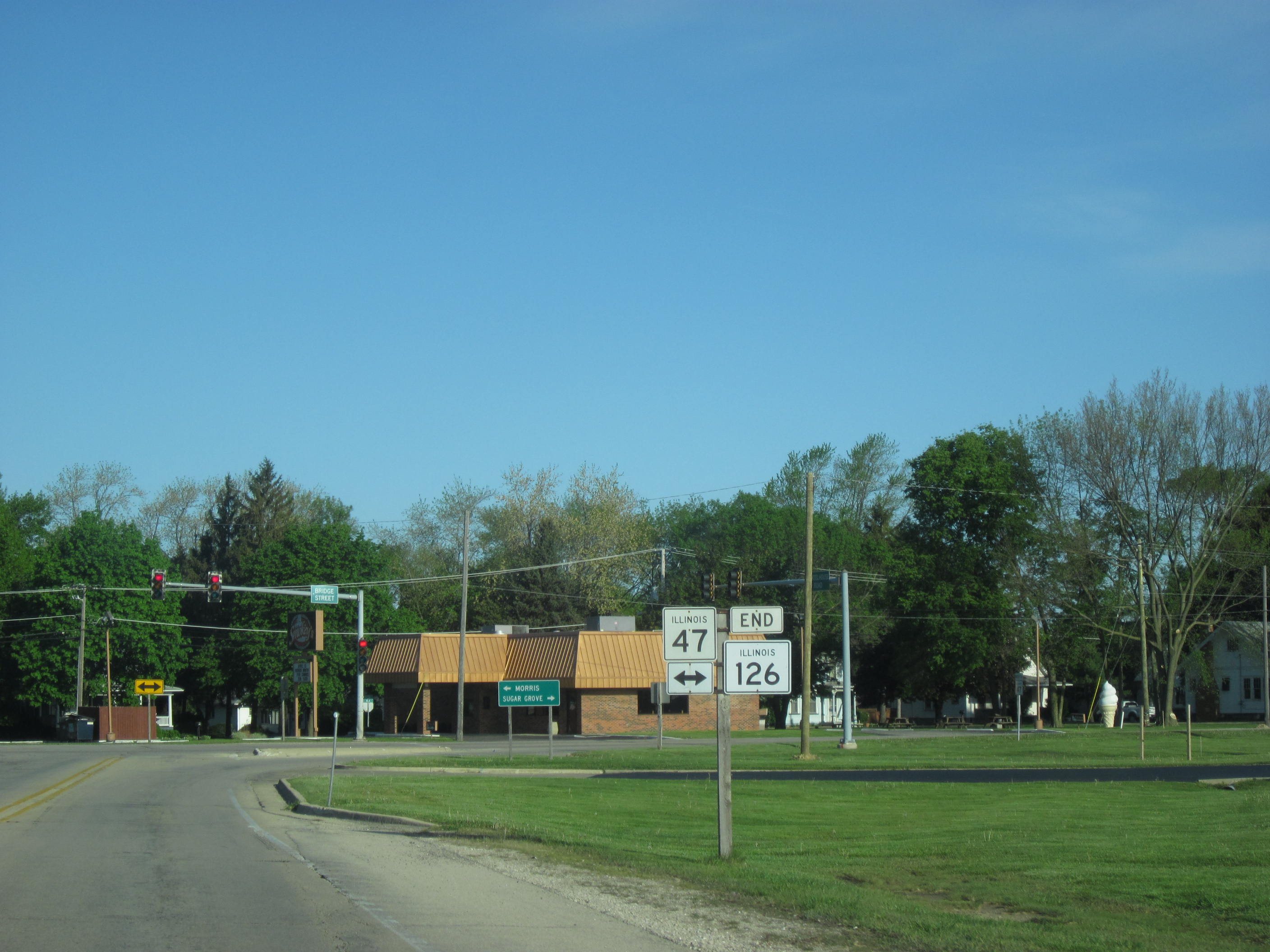
IL 126 at its western terminus

IL 126 begins at an intersection with IL 47 in Yorkville, and travels as a rural two-lane road until it intersects historic Lincoln Highway and enters Plainfield as West Lockport Road. Immediately after crossing the DuPage River, it turns northeast onto Main Street, bypassing Downtown Plainfield, and intersects the concurrency of US 30 and IL 59 at North Division Street. It continues northeastward out of Plainfield on Main Street until it ends at an intersection with I-55. There is no access to IL 126 from northbound I-55. Likewise, there is no southbound I-55 access from IL 126.

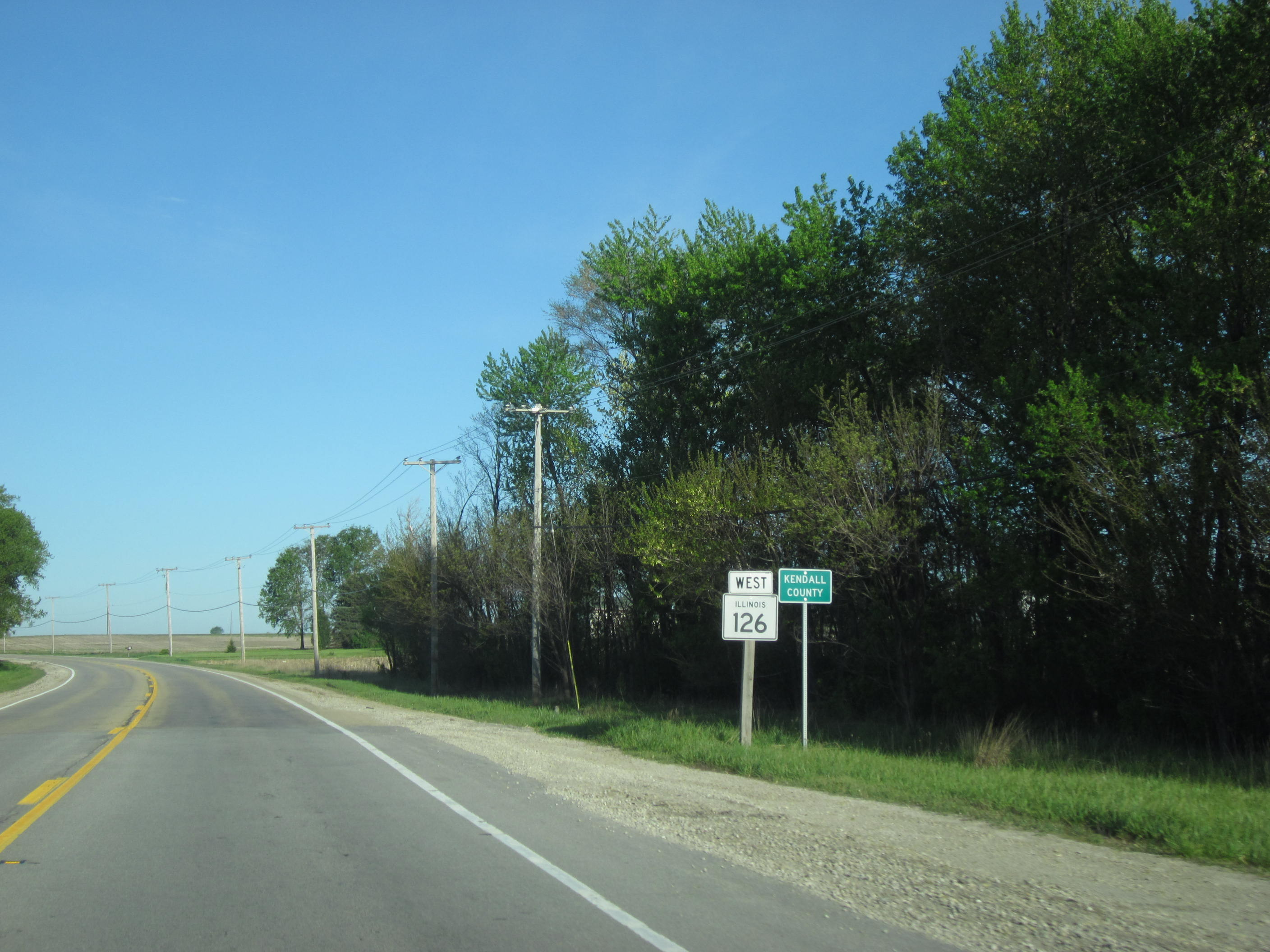
IL 126 westbound entering Kendall County

For most of its length, IL 126 is an undivided two-lane surface road, until a high-speed ramp is used to access northbound I-55 at its eastern terminus.

Congestion in Plainfield is increasing substantially on this highway, IL 59, and US 30 because of near-explosive growth in Plainfield, a southwest suburb of Chicago.

== History ==
The history of IL 126, in both of its incarnations, is tied closely to the history of US 66.

The original State Bond Issue Route 126 (SBI 126) opened in 1929 to carry the then-new US 66 from Springfield to Litchfield, bypassing the numerous towns along IL 4. Initially, this road was marked as both US 66 and IL 126. In 1934, the concurrency of IL 126 was removed, and this road was known only as US 66.

SBI 66 originally traveled from Plainfield to Welco Corners in present-day Bolingbrook, where it intersected SBI 4. However, by then, SBI 4 was also designated as US 66, which created confusion with IL 66. So, in 1935, IL 66 was given the route number "126", which had been removed from US 66 in southern Illinois, and the new IL 126 was extended west from Plainfield to Yorkville.

In 1940, US 66 was rerouted through Plainfield to bypass congestion in Joliet As a result, IL 126 was truncated to travel only from Yorkville to Plainfield, with US 66 taking over part of IL 126 (former SBI 66) from Plainfield to Welco Corners. When US 66 was rerouted in 1957 onto its new freeway alignment bypassing Plainfield, which would later become I-55, IL 126 was re-extended east from Plainfield along its pre-1940 route to meet I-55/US 66. This resulted in the section of the highway from Plainfield to I-55/US 66 having had four route numbers in its history: 66, 126, 66 (again), and 126 (again).

Until US 30 was rerouted in 2008, IL 126 was concurrent with it for a short distance approaching Plainfield from the west, between Wallin Drive (part of Lincoln Highway) and Main Street where IL 126 travels northeast.

== Future ==
IL 126 is planned to bypass downtown Plainfield via 143rd Street in fall 2025. The plan involves extending 143rd Street west from Steiner Road to Ridge Road (opened on December 20, 2024) and east from IL 59 to the existing alignment of IL 126.

== Major intersections ==
County	Location	mi	km	Destinations	Notes
Kendall	Yorkville	0.00	0.00	IL 47 (Bridge Street) – Sugar Grove, Morris	Western terminus
Kendall	Yorkville	1.40	2.25	IL 71 (Stagecoach Trail) – Ottawa, Oswego	
Kendall	Plainfield	9.90	15.93	CR 11 (Ridge Road) to I-80 – Minooka	
Will	Plainfield	12.40	19.96	Lincoln Highway west (Wallin Drive) – Aurora	West end of Lincoln Hwy overlap
Will	Plainfield	13.00	20.92	Lincoln Highway east (Lockport Street)	East end of Lincoln Hwy overlap
Will	Plainfield	13.40	21.57	US 30 / IL 59 (Division Street) – Shorewood, West Chicago	
Will	Bolingbrook	17.25	27.76	I-55 north – Chicago	Eastern terminus; eastbound exit and westbound entrance; I-55 exit 261
1.000 mi = 1.609 km; 1.000 km = 0.621 mi: Concurrency terminus; Incomplete access
