= Martin House (Fulton, Illinois) =

Historic house in Illinois, United States

- U.S. National Register of Historic Places
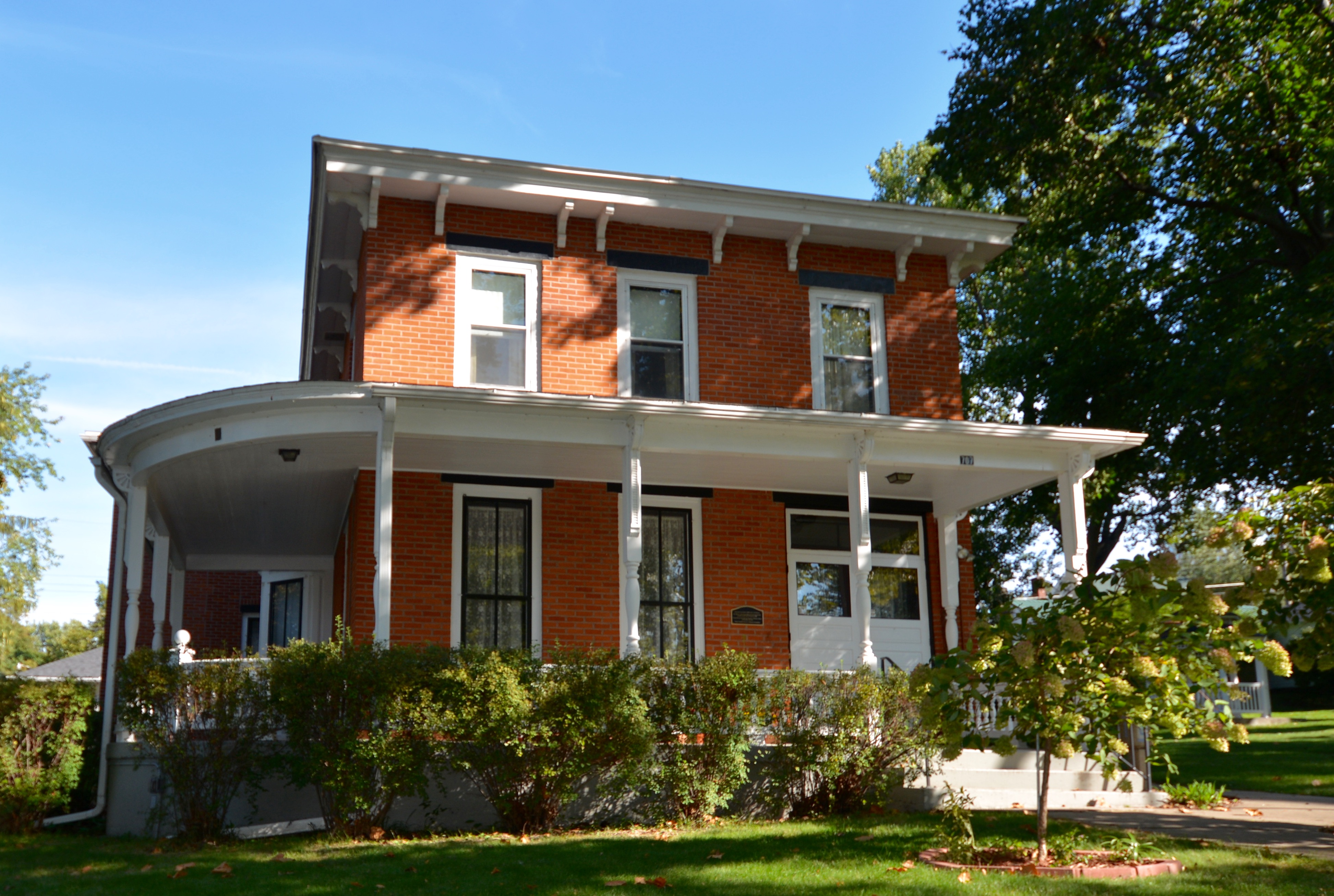

- Location within Illinois
- Location: 707 10th Ave., Fulton, Illinois
- Coordinates: 41°52′03″N 90°09′43″W
- Built: 1855
- Architectural style: Italianate
- NRHP reference No.: 14001068
- Added to NRHP: December 22, 2014

The Martin House is a historic house located at 707 10th Avenue in Fulton, Illinois. The Italianate house was built in 1855, when the style was becoming popular nationally. The house features a hip roof with bracketed eaves, tall windows, and a bay window on the east side, all distinctive Italianate elements. A wraparound front porch, a Queen Anne element, was added circa 1898. A 1908 renovation of the entry hall and dining room added Eastlake elements to the former and gave the latter an Arts and Crafts design.

The house was added to the National Register of Historic Places on December 22, 2014.
