= De Immigrant =

Windmill in Fulton, Illinois, United States

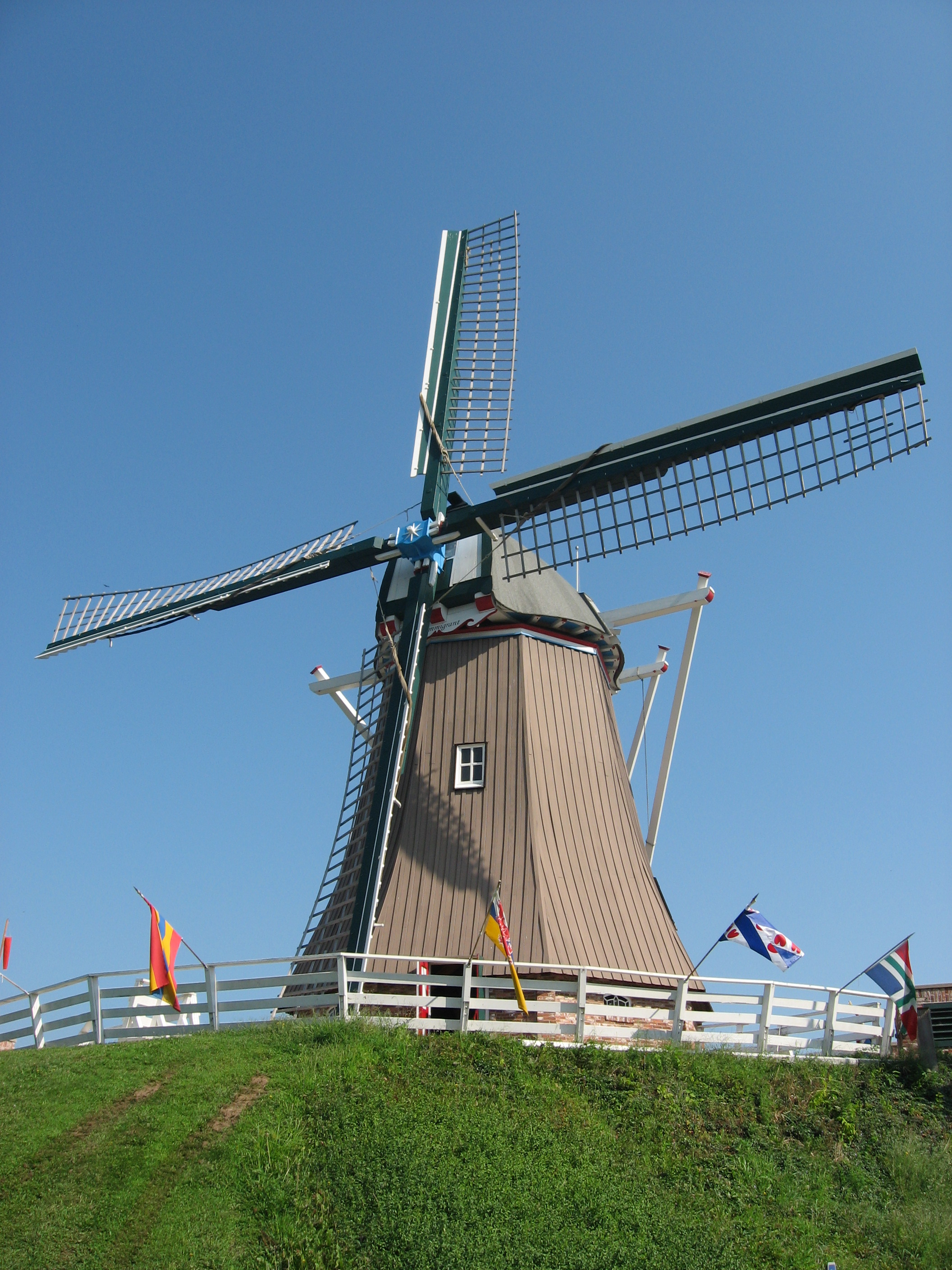
- De Immigrant in August 2009
- Interactive map of De Immigrant

Origin
- Mill name: Fulton's Dutch Mill
- Mill location: Fulton, Illinois
- Coordinates: 41°52′2″N 90°10′7″W
- Operator: City of Fulton (1999-present)
- Year built: between 1999-2001

De Immigrant is a windmill located in Fulton, Illinois, built on a flood control dike on the Mississippi River. The City of Fulton contracted Molema Millbuilders, Havenga Construction, and Lowlands Management on December 4, 1998, to construct a Dutch windmill, to be fabricated by native millwrights in the Netherlands and shipped to Fulton for assembly. Two months later, construction began with thirty metric tons of wood. The construction took place in phases, and the tower, cap, sails, and machinery were all put together on November 19, 1999. On May 5, 2001, De Immigrant officially began grinding wheat, buckwheat, rye, and cornmeal.
