= Gateway Bridge (Illinois–Iowa) =

Bridge over the Mississippi River

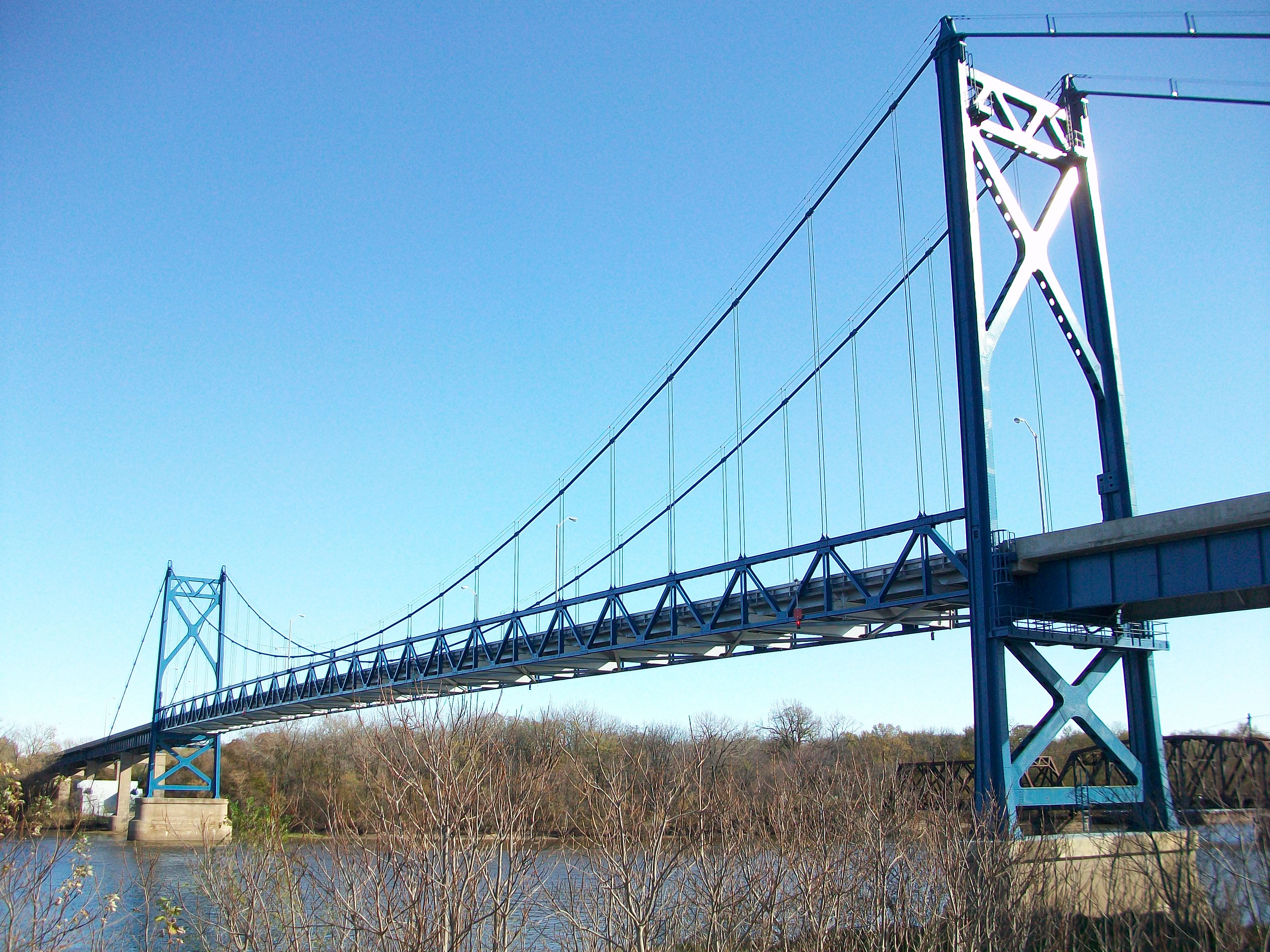
- Coordinates: 41°50′16″N 90°11′02″W
- Carries: 2 lanes of US 30
- Crosses: Mississippi River
- Locale: Clinton, Iowa and Fulton, Illinois
- Maintained by: Illinois Department of Transportation

Characteristics
- Design: Suspension bridge
- Total length: 1,269.49 m (4,165 ft)
- Width: 7.92 m (26 ft)
- Longest span: 196.29 m (644 ft)
- No. of lanes: 2

History
- Designer: Modjeski & Masters
- Engineering design by: City of Clinton Bridge Commission
- Opened: June 1956

Statistics
- Daily traffic: 10,000

The Gateway Bridge (locally called the South Bridge) is a suspension bridge over the Mississippi River in Clinton, Iowa, United States. It carries U.S. Route 30 from Iowa into Illinois just south of Fulton, Illinois. The bridge itself is two travel lanes wide.

== Description ==
The Gateway Bridge is a steel suspension bridge that carries U.S. Route 30 from Clinton, Iowa to Fulton, Illinois. Its main span length is 1,269.49 m (4,165 ft), its maximum length is 196.3 m (644 ft), and its width is 7.92 m (26 ft). The consultant engineer to the bridge was the City of Clinton Commission. The bridge was financed by bonds, which expired in 1979.

== History ==
The bridge was constructed from August 1954 to May 1956, and the bridge opened at the end of June 1956. Illinois Lieutenant Governor John William Chapman said that the bridge would have a "considerable impact on the improvement of the economic and traffic pattern of Iowa and Illinois". Iowa Governor Leo Hoegh called the bridge a "masterpiece in engineering" and praised Iowa for its role in the project. Henry O. Talle, a congressman who represented Iowa's 2nd congressional district, stated that the bridge opening was "something worthy to be remembered."

In 1982, the Illinois-Iowa Department of Transportation announced that tolls would be discontinued on the bridge.

From February to December 1999, the Gateway Bridge closed for a construction upgrade, which had an estimate cost of $10.6 million.

It was closed in March 2006 for repainting and reconstruction of Route 30 on the Illinois side of the river, and reopened in November 2006. Traffic on U.S. Route 30 intending to cross the river was detoured north to the Lyons-Fulton Bridge.

From October 1, 2018, to October 4, 2018, the lane on the bridge closed for bridge inspections.

== See also ==
- List of crossings of the Upper Mississippi River
- Clinton Railroad Bridge, a railroad swing bridge adjacent to the bridge
