= List of county roads in DeKalb County, Illinois =

The DeKalb County Highway System is a county-maintained system of arterial county highways in DeKalb County, Illinois, United States. They are marked with the standard M1-6 pentagon-shaped highway marker on the base of traffic signals at intersections with other county highways. They are not marked on any freeway or tollway exits or signed with separate reassurance markers. In addition, although concurrencies of county highways exist in the county, they too are not explicitly signed as such.

== Route list ==
Number	Length (mi)	Length (km)	Southern or western terminus	Northern or eastern terminus	Local names	Formed	Removed	Notes
CR 1	—	—	IL 38 (Lincoln Highway)	IL 64 (State Street)	East County Line Road	—	—	
CR 3	—	—	CR 14 (Esmond Road)	IL 64 (State Street)	Old State Road	—	—	
CR 4	—	—	South DeKalb–LaSalle County	CR 11 (Suydam Road)	Leland Road	—	—	
CR 5	—	—	DeKalb–Sycamore city limits	CR 21 (Cherry Valley Road)	Glidden Road	—	—	
CR 6	—	—	South DeKalb–LaSalle county line	IL 38 (Lincoln Highway)	Rollo Road, Shabbona Road	—	—	
CR 7	—	—	West DeKalb–Ogle county line (West County Line Road)	East DeKalb–Kane county line (East County Line Road)	Perry Road	—	—	
CR 9	—	—	Duffy Road	CR 7 (Perry Road)	Waterman Road	—	—	
CR 10	—	—	US 34 (Walter Payton Memorial Highway)	IL 38 (Lincoln Highway)	Somonauk Road	—	—	
CR 11	—	—	CR 6 (Rollo Road)	Sandwich city limits	Suydam Road	—	—	
CR 12	—	—	Carol Avenue	Bethany Road	Somonauk Road	—	—	
CR 13	—	—	North DeKarb–Boone county line	Deer Creek Drive	Genoa Road	—	—	
CR 14	—	—	CR 3 (Old State Road)	Ch 20 (Lindenwood Road)	Esmond Road	—	—	
CR 15	—	—	IL 23	East DeKalb–Kane county line (East County Line Road)	Plank Road	—	—	
CR 16	—	—	CR 6 (Shabbona Road)	CR 10 (Somonauk Road)	Chicago Road	—	—	
CR 18	—	—	North State Street	North DeKalb–McHenry county line (Poplar Road)	North State Road	—	—	
CR 20	—	—	West DeKalb–Ogle county line	CR 14 (Esmond Road)	Lindenwood Road	—	—	
CR 22	—	—	CR 33 (Rich Road, Coltonville Road)	IL 64 (State Street)	North 1st Street	—	—	
CR 23	—	—	CR 30 (West County Line Road)	CR 6 (Shabbona Road)	Lee Road	—	—	
CR 24	—	—	West DeKalb–Ogle county line (West County Line Road)	CR 6 (Rollo Road)	Chicago Road	—	—	
CR 26	—	—	IL 72	CR 21 (Cherry Valley Road)	Five Points Road	—	—	
CR 27	—	—	IL 23	CR 12 (Somonauk Road)	Barber Greene Road	—	—	
CR 29	—	—	IL 72	North DeKalb–Boone county line (Crain Road)	Kirkland Road	—	—	
CR 30	—	—	US 30	CR 23 (Lee Road)	West County Line Road	—	—	
CR 31	—	—	CR 3 (Old State Road)	IL 38 (Lincoln Highway)	Malta Road	—	—	
CR 32	—	—	CR 21 (Cherry Valley Road)	North DeKalb–Boone county line	Stone Quarry Road	—	—	
CR 33	—	—	CR 5 (Glidden Road)	West Stonehenge Drive	Rich Road, Coltonville Road	—	—	
CR 34	—	—	Pleasant Street	IL 23 (Main Street)	Peace Road	—	—	
CR 35	—	—	CR 7 (Perry Road)	Harvestore Drive	South 1st Street	—	—	
