= Cedar Rapids and Missouri River Railroad =

- Cedar Rapids and Missouri River Railroad, from Cedar Rapids to Marshall

Overview
- Headquarters: Cedar Rapids, Iowa
- Locale: Iowa, United States
- Dates of operation: 1860–1884
- Successor: Chicago and North Western Railway

The Cedar Rapids and Missouri River Railroad (CR&MR) was a railroad chartered to run from Cedar Rapids, Iowa, to Council Bluffs, Iowa, on the Missouri River. Under lease by the Chicago & North Western Railway, it was the first railroad to reach Council Bluffs from the east. This therefore connected Chicago with Omaha, Nebraska which was the eastern terminus of the First transcontinental railroad on the opposite side of the river,. It was one of four railroads that were built as result of the Iowa Land Bill of 1856 that gave land grants for railroads.

== Background and construction ==
The Chicago, Iowa and Nebraska Railroad Company (CI&N) was a 'land grant railroad' organized in 1855 in conjunction with the Iowa Land Co. in Clinton, Iowa. As the name indicates, its plan was to build across Iowa and cross the Missouri river but it had only reached Cedar Rapids by 1859 when it ran out of money. It had, however, managed to build a short bridge from the east side of the Mississippi to the Little Rock Island at a place opposite Clinton called "the narrows". This determined the location of the rail connection with Chicago and the eventual location of the Clinton Railroad Bridge. In the meantime the connection was by steam ferry.

The CR&MR railroad was chartered on January 20, 1856, organized on January 16, 1860, and composed largely of stockholders in the CI&N, which had been unable to get beyond Cedar Rapids. Its purpose was to complete the road to the Missouri river at Omaha.

Land grants had also been made to the Iowa Central Air Line Railroad, but they too were not able to fulfill their charter to build a line across the state. State legislators then advocated for those land grants to be transferred to the CR&MR in 1859. But, since the Central Iowa Air Line had already transferred 76,800 acres of land grants, mainly in Woodbury and Monroe Counties, to construction contractors as payment for work they had done, those contractors filed suit to keep the land. The case, Courtright vs. The Cedar Rapids and Missouri River Railroad Company, worked its way up to the Iowa Supreme Court where their claims were affirmed in 1872. By 1876, the total of land grants awarded to the CR&MR amounted to 628,589.71 acres.

Meanwhile Union Pacific Railroad baron Thomas Clark Durant was manipulating railroad stocks to add to his fortune. "Doc" Durant controlled another of the Iowa land grant railroads, the Mississippi and Missouri Railroad (M&M) and ran up its stock by saying the transcontinental railroad would connect to it. Then while selling high priced M&M stock, he was buying the depressed CR&MR stock. Durant then declared that the CR&MR would be the railroad of choice for the transcontinental connection. After buying back the newly depressed M&M stock, Durant and his cohorts made about $5 million.

The CR&MR began construction soon after it was organized, with 27 miles (43 km) of track laid westward from Cedar Rapids in 1860. Construction continued and was completed to Marshalltown in early 1863.

The city of Ames, Iowa, was created as a station stop on the line. Ames was chartered in 1864 for the railroad and was named by CR&MR President John Blair for Massachusetts Congressman Oakes Ames one of Blair's directors.

Construction reached the Missouri River in late 1866, making the CR&MR the first railroad to cross Iowa on an east-west route and reach this river. The first train arrived in Council Bluffs over the line on January 22, 1867. There the line connected with the Union Pacific.

== The Galena and the Chicago North Western take-over ==
Meanwhile, the Galena and Chicago Union Railroad was envisioning a grand design for a road from Chicago across the Mississippi River and across Iowa to connect with Durant's Union Pacific in Omaha at Council Bluffs. To do this they needed to get control of Blair's CR&MR as well as the CI&N and the Mississippi railroad bridge. In the spring of 1861 they planted a young civil engineer from Vermont, Isaac B Howe, to assume control of construction on the road. The previous engineer and superintendent, Col. Milo Smith, would soon be leaving to lead the 26th Iowa Infantry Regiment to war against the Confederate rebellion.

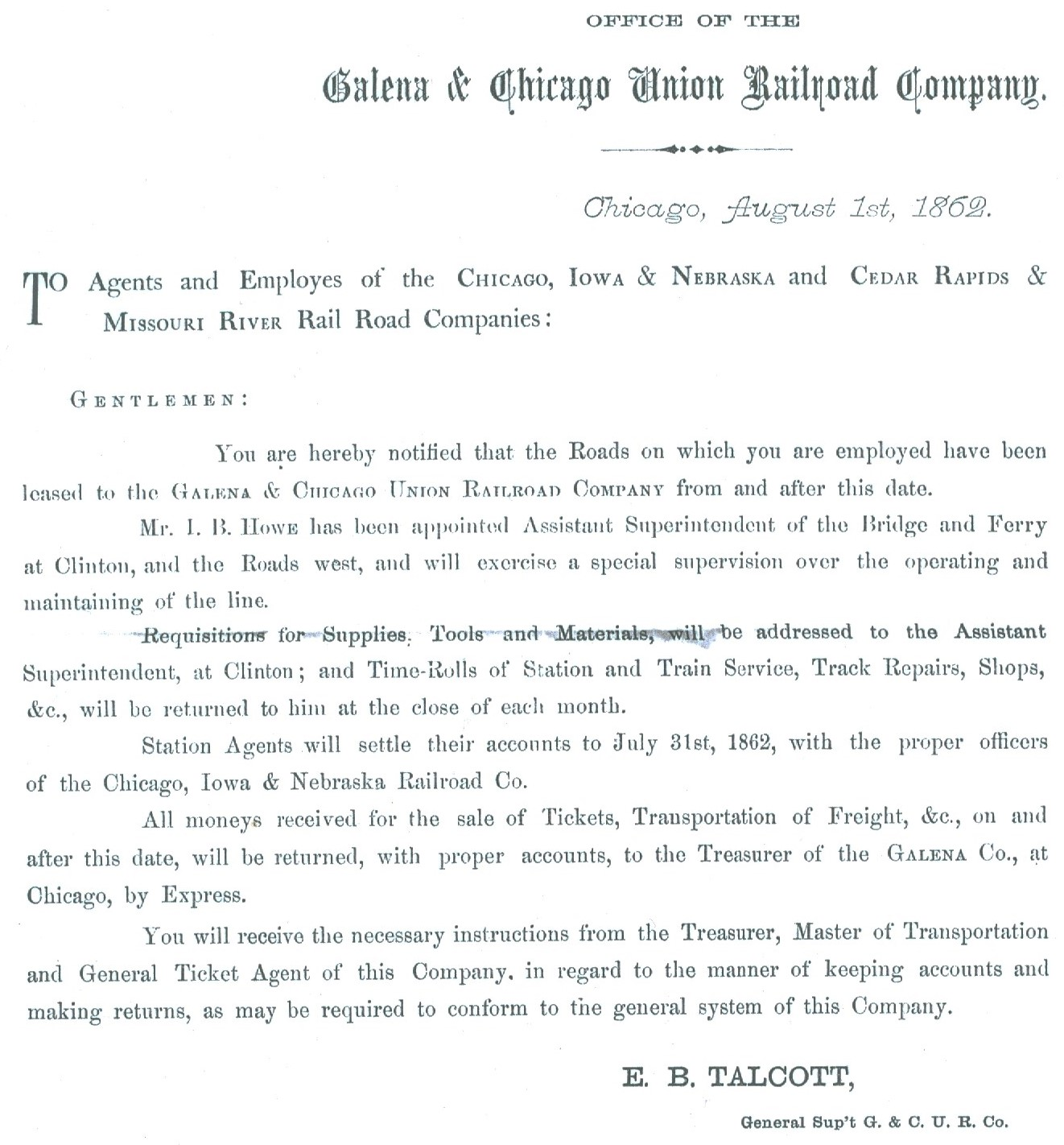
IB Howe appointed Assistant Superintendent in charge of the leased CI&N and CR&MR railroads, August 1, 1862

In July 1862, the Galena and Chicago Union Railroad leased both Clinton Iowa lines in perpetuity. The Galena line was in turn consolidated with the Chicago and North Western Railway on June 2, 1864, and the line to Council Bluffs was completed in January 1867. The lease was formally turned into a sale in 1884.
