= Mississippi and Missouri Railroad =

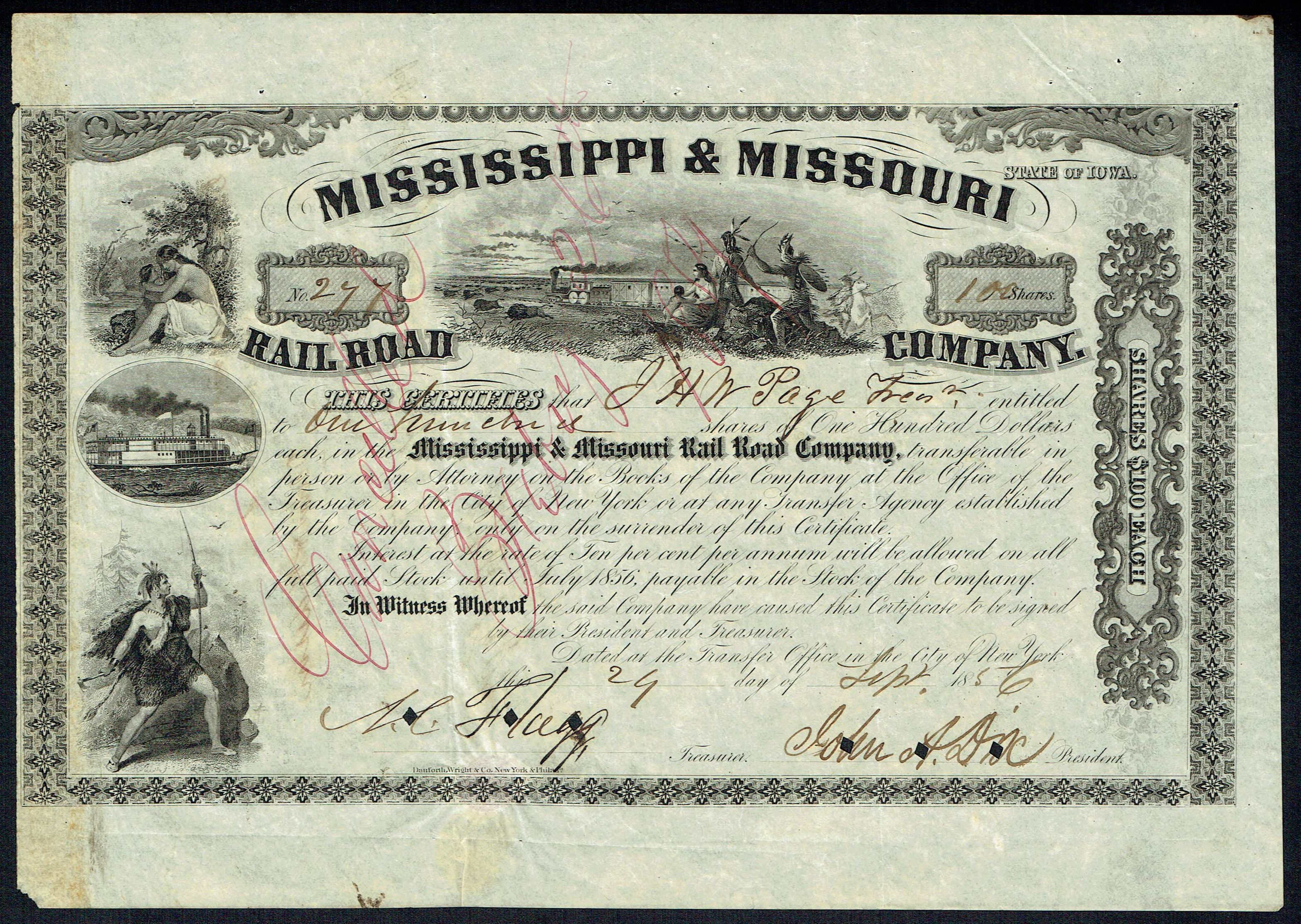
Share of the Mississippi & Missouri Railroad Company, issued 24. September 1856

The Mississippi and Missouri Railroad (M&M Railroad) was the first railroad in Iowa. It was chartered in 1853 to build a line between Davenport, Iowa, on the Mississippi River and Council Bluffs, Iowa, on the Missouri River. The railroad was the first west of the Mississippi river to join by bridge to the East. It played an important role in the construction of the First transcontinental railroad although the competing Cedar Rapids and Missouri River Railroad under lease to the Chicago & North Western railroad actually became the first Iowa railroad to reach Council Bluffs from the Mississippi River. Thomas C. Durant, vice president of the Union Pacific Railroad, owned stock in both.

== History ==
The M&M line originally was created so that the Chicago and Rock Island Railroad could extend its line across the Mississippi River into Iowa via the Rock Island Bridge, the first bridge to cross the Mississippi.

Shortly after the bridge opened in 1856, a steamboat hit the bridge and steamboat companies sued to have the bridge dismantled. The M&M and Rock Island hired private attorney Abraham Lincoln to defend the bridge. The case worked through the courts reaching the U.S. Supreme Court in 1862 during the American Civil War. That court decided in the bridge's favor.

During Lincoln's investigation into the case, he traveled to Council Bluffs to inspect M&M property in August 1859 under the guidance of the M&M attorney Norman Judd. On the visit Judd and M&M engineer Grenville Dodge described the merits of locating the western terminus of the M&M railroad at Council Bluffs and the eastern terminus of the Pacific railroad at Omaha. After the Pacific Railroad Act in 1862, Lincoln selected Omaha, opposite Council Bluffs on the Missouri river, as the eastern terminus of the Pacific railroad. The Union Pacific created by former M&M owner Thomas C. Durant was selected to build the railroad westward toward the Pacific coast.

Durant was slow to build the M&M through Iowa although quick to manipulate its stock. He had gained control of the Union Pacific because of his stated plans for the M&M. However, the line under his ownership did not even make it half way across the state, terminating in Kellogg, Iowa, 40 miles (64 km) east of Des Moines, Iowa, in 1865 with a branch to Muscatine, Iowa, ending in Washington, Iowa.

Durant built up his fortune by manipulating the M&M stock via rumors. First he drove up and sold M&M stock by saying the transcontinental railroad would travel across Iowa via the M&M while at the same time quietly buying depressed Cedar Rapids and Missouri Railroad (CR&MR) stock. Then he spread rumors that drove up the CR&MR stock that the transcontinental would follow that line instead and Durant bought back the newly depressed M&M stock. The gambit made Durant and his cohorts $5 million.

The Rock Island Line bought the M&M on July 9, 1866, and completed its line to Council Bluffs in 1869 and extended the Muscatine/Washington Line to Leavenworth, Kansas. The merged railroad was called the Chicago, Rock Island and Pacific Railroad, a name it kept until it was dissolved in bankruptcy in the 1970s.

== See also ==
- Cedar Rapids and Missouri River Railroad
