= Mark Morris Memorial Bridge =

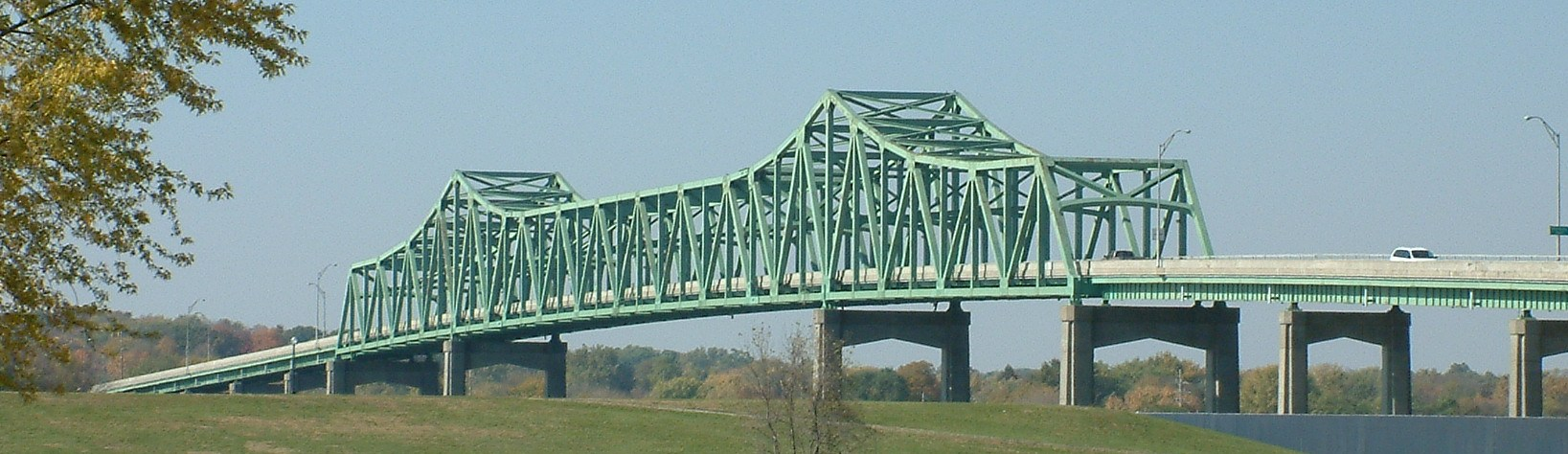
- Coordinates: 41°51′53″N 90°10′23″W
- Carries: 2 lanes of Iowa 136 / IL 136
- Crosses: Mississippi River
- Locale: Clinton, Iowa and Fulton, Illinois
- Official name: Mark Morris Memorial Bridge
- Other name(s): North Bridge; Lyons-Fulton Bridge
- Maintained by: Iowa Department of Transportation

Characteristics
- Design: Truss bridge
- Longest span: 499 feet (152 m)

History
- Opened: January 1975

Statistics
- Daily traffic: 9,800

Location
- Interactive map of Mark Morris Memorial Bridge

The Mark Morris Memorial Bridge (locally called the North Bridge) is a 2 lane truss bridge across the Mississippi River in the United States. It connects the cities of Clinton, Iowa and Fulton, Illinois. The bridge may also be known as the Lyons-Fulton Bridge, which was the name of a predecessor bridge and the name listed on the USGS topographical map. The town of Lyons, Iowa, was annexed to Clinton in 1895, but the northern end of the city is still referred to as Lyons. The bridge is the terminus of both Iowa Highway 136 and Illinois Route 136. The 1975 bridge was named in memory Mark Morris, a long time member of the City of Clinton Bridge Commission who died in 1972. Morris was instrumental in the construction of the 1975 bridge and the City of Clinton Bridge Commission named it in his honor.

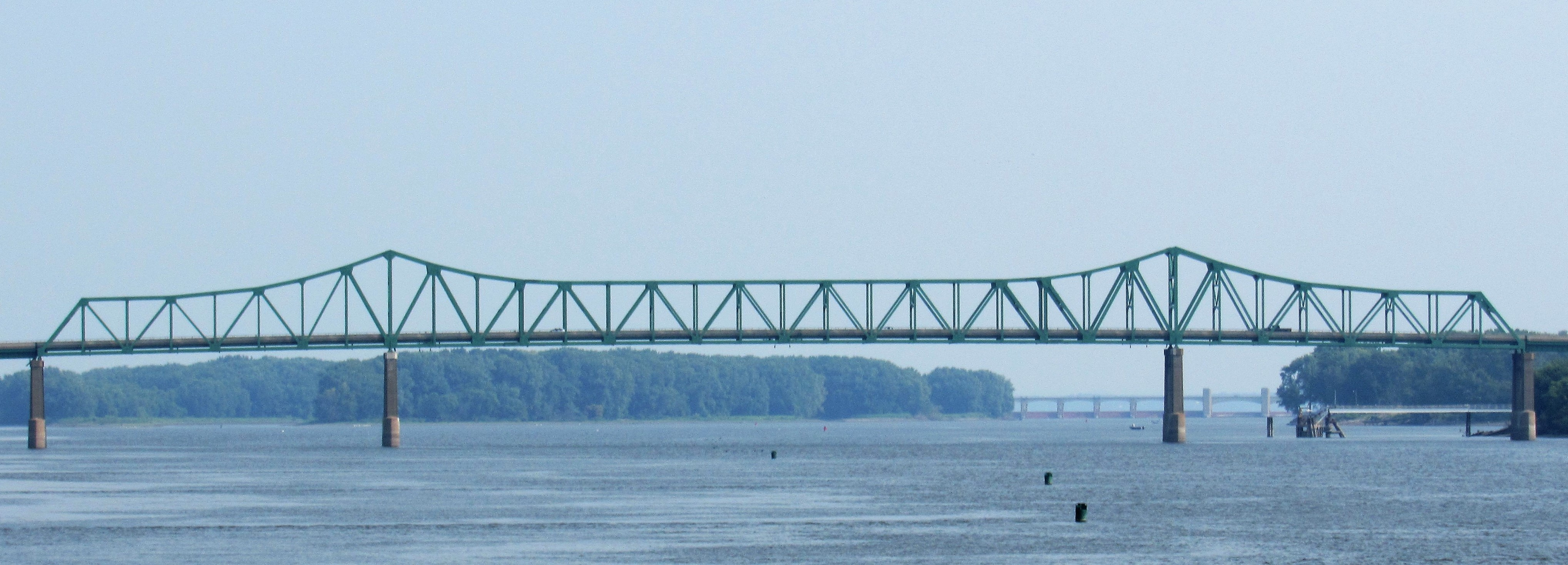
View of the bridge from the river.

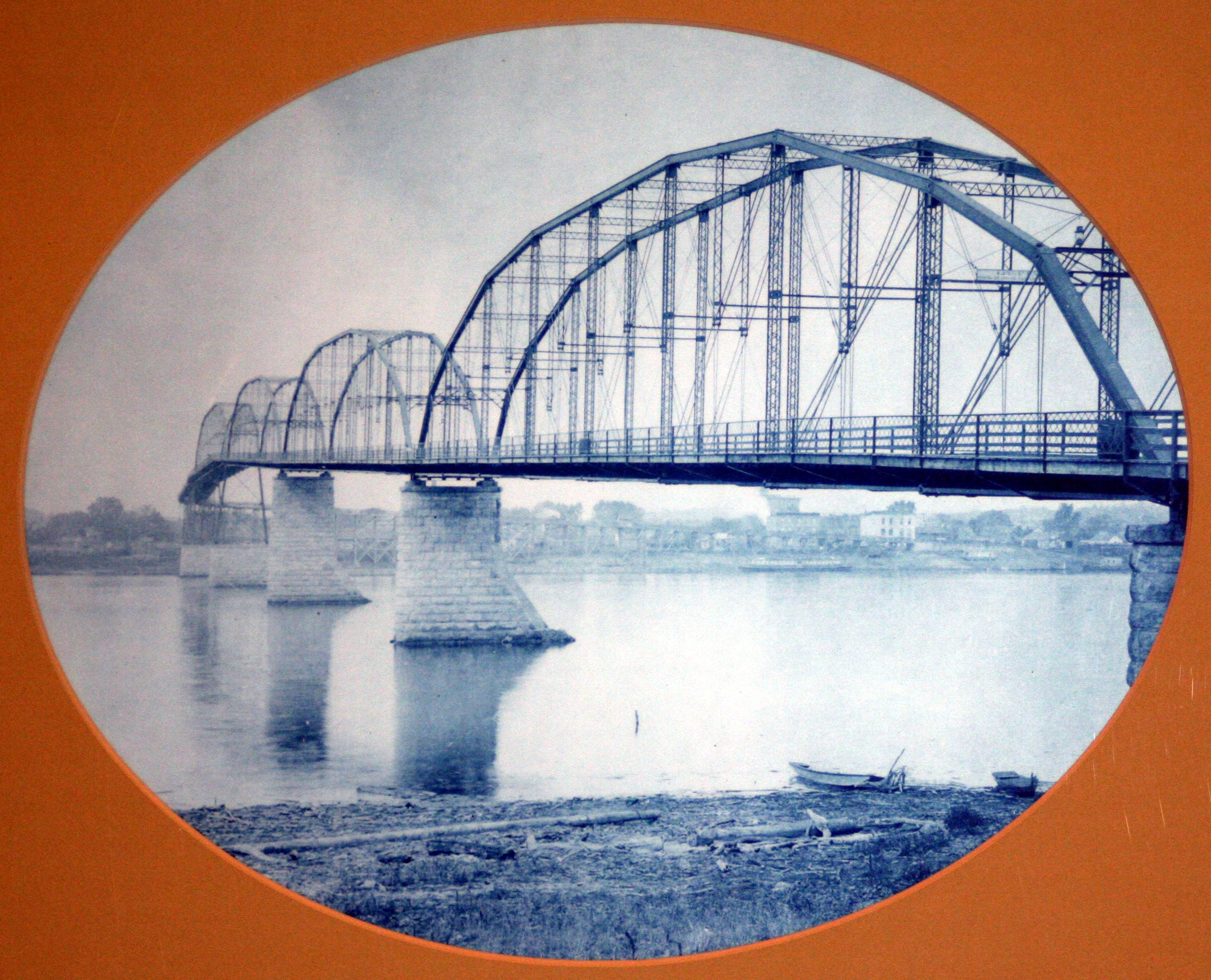
Wagon bridge, Fulton, Illinois (1891)

The bridge was opened in January 1975, replacing an older span upstream that once carried the Lincoln Highway, U.S. Route 30.) In 1982, Iowa DOT announced that it would be removing a 20 cent toll from the Gateway Bridge and the Mark Morris bridge beginning January 1983. Iowa and Illinois agreed to split responsibility for the maintenance of the two bridges with Iowa maintaining the Mark Morris bridge and Illinois the Gateway bridge.

== 1891 bridge ==
The older span was originally built in 1891 with a wooden deck; this was replaced in 1933 with a metal grate to allow snow to melt through. When the renovation was completed the bridge fathers held a grand ceremony during which a 19-year-old Cedar Rapids high dive artist, Walter W. Simon, dove from the 100-foot (30 m) high span into the Mississippi River. He was paid $1.00 per foot for this stunt.

== See also ==
- List of crossings of the Upper Mississippi River
