= Coloma Township, Illinois =

Coloma Township
- Township
- Location in Whiteside County
- Coordinates: 41°46′19″N 89°41′29″W
- Country: United States
- State: Illinois
- County: Whiteside
- Established: November 4, 1851

Area
  - Total: 11.18 sq mi (29.0 km^{2})
  - Land: 10.05 sq mi (26.0 km^{2})
  - Water: 1.13 sq mi (2.9 km^{2}) 10.11%
- Elevation: 650 ft (200 m)

Population (2010)
  - Estimate (2016): 10,907
  - Density: 1,131.1/sq mi (436.7/km^{2})
- Time zone: UTC-6 (CST)
  - Summer (DST): UTC-5 (CDT)
- FIPS code: 17-195-15651

Coloma Township is located in Whiteside County, Illinois. As of the 2010 census, its population was 11,371 and it contained 5,162 housing units. It consists of the area in and around Rock Falls, Illinois.

== Geography ==
According to the 2010 census, the township has a total area of 11.18 square miles (29.0 km^{2}), of which 10.05 square miles (26.0 km^{2}) (or 89.89%) is land and 1.13 square miles (2.9 km^{2}) (or 10.11%) is water.

== Demographics ==
Historical population
Census	Pop.	Note	%±
2016 (est.)	10,907
U.S. Decennial Census
