= Fulton, Illinois =

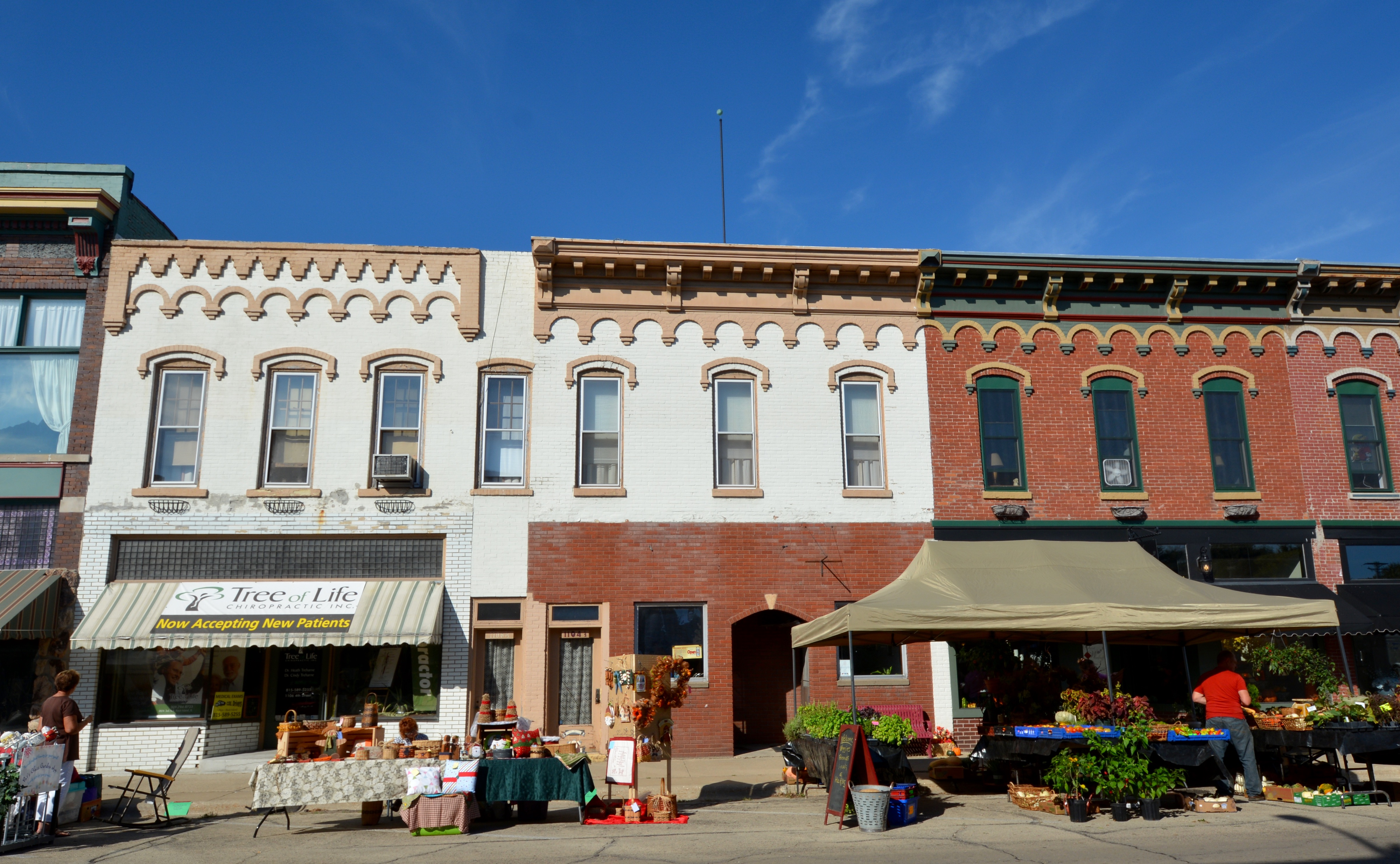
- Fulton Commercial Historic District

- Flag

- Location of Fulton in Whiteside County, Illinois.
- Coordinates: 41°52′21″N 90°09′28″W
- Country: United States
- State: Illinois
- County: Whiteside

Area
  - Total: 2.80 sq mi (7.25 km^{2})
  - Land: 2.34 sq mi (6.05 km^{2})
  - Water: 0.46 sq mi (1.19 km^{2})
- Elevation: 591 ft (180 m)

Population (2020)
  - Total: 3,647
  - Density: 1,560.1/sq mi (602.37/km^{2})
- Time zone: UTC-6 (CST)
  - Summer (DST): UTC-5 (CDT)
- ZIP code: 61252
- Area code: 815
- FIPS code: 17-28144
- GNIS feature ID: 2394833
- Website: www.cityoffulton.us

Fulton is a city in Whiteside County, Illinois, United States. As of the 2020 census, Fulton had a population of 3,647. Fulton is located across the Mississippi River from Clinton, Iowa.

== History ==
A post office called Fulton has been in operation since 1838. The city was named for Robert Fulton, inventor of the steamboat.

== Geography ==
Fulton is located on the east bank of the Mississippi River near Lock and Dam #13. The most northeastern portion of the county is in the Driftless Area of Illinois.

According to the 2010 census, Fulton has a total area of 2.334 square miles (6.05 km^{2}), of which 2.27 square miles (5.88 km^{2}) (or 97.26%) is land and 0.064 square miles (0.17 km^{2}) (or 2.74%) is water.

Fulton is a city most known for its pride in its Dutch heritage. This is shown through the addition of a traditional Dutch windmill, De Immigrant, located near the city's dike, which borders the Mississippi. Other local attractions include: the Martin House Museum, Heritage Canyon, the Dutch Days festival held annually on the first weekend of May, and its view of the Mississippi River.

=== Climate ===
Climate data for Fulton, Illinois (1991–2020 normals, extremes 1938–present)
Month	Jan	Feb	Mar	Apr	May	Jun	Jul	Aug	Sep	Oct	Nov	Dec	Year
Record high °F (°C)	62 (17)	72 (22)	83 (28)	91 (33)	96 (36)	98 (37)	102 (39)	102 (39)	96 (36)	90 (32)	82 (28)	68 (20)	102 (39)
Mean daily maximum °F (°C)	29.3 (−1.5)	33.8 (1.0)	45.7 (7.6)	59.4 (15.2)	71.1 (21.7)	80.7 (27.1)	84.0 (28.9)	82.1 (27.8)	75.9 (24.4)	63.0 (17.2)	47.6 (8.7)	34.8 (1.6)	58.9 (14.9)
Daily mean °F (°C)	21.4 (−5.9)	25.4 (−3.7)	36.9 (2.7)	49.6 (9.8)	61.2 (16.2)	71.2 (21.8)	74.6 (23.7)	72.7 (22.6)	65.5 (18.6)	53.2 (11.8)	39.5 (4.2)	27.7 (−2.4)	49.9 (9.9)
Mean daily minimum °F (°C)	13.6 (−10.2)	17.1 (−8.3)	28.2 (−2.1)	39.8 (4.3)	51.4 (10.8)	61.7 (16.5)	65.2 (18.4)	63.2 (17.3)	55.2 (12.9)	43.4 (6.3)	31.4 (−0.3)	20.5 (−6.4)	40.9 (4.9)
Record low °F (°C)	−33 (−36)	−27 (−33)	−14 (−26)	13 (−11)	30 (−1)	40 (4)	46 (8)	40 (4)	26 (−3)	13 (−11)	−5 (−21)	−22 (−30)	−33 (−36)
Average precipitation inches (mm)	1.40 (36)	1.56 (40)	2.41 (61)	3.39 (86)	4.03 (102)	4.52 (115)	3.40 (86)	3.43 (87)	3.66 (93)	2.58 (66)	2.20 (56)	1.69 (43)	34.27 (870)
Average precipitation days (≥ 0.01 in)	6.5	6.3	8.1	9.9	10.8	10.5	7.8	8.2	7.5	8.0	6.8	7.4	97.8
Source: NOAA

== Demographics ==
Historical population
Census	Pop.	Note	%±
1860	1,512		—
1870	1,875		24.0%
1880	1,733		−7.6%
1890	2,099		21.1%
1900	2,685		27.9%
1910	2,174		−19.0%
1920	2,445		12.5%
1930	2,656		8.6%
1940	2,585		−2.7%
1950	2,706		4.7%
1960	3,387		25.2%
1970	3,630		7.2%
1980	3,936		8.4%
1990	3,698		−6.0%
2000	3,881		4.9%
2010	3,481		−10.3%
2020	3,647		4.8%
U.S. Decennial Census

=== 2020 census ===
As of the 2020 census, Fulton had a population of 3,647. The median age was 42.8 years. 21.0% of residents were under the age of 18 and 23.6% of residents were 65 years of age or older. For every 100 females there were 98.1 males, and for every 100 females age 18 and over there were 95.3 males age 18 and over.

99.8% of residents lived in urban areas, while 0.2% lived in rural areas.

There were 1,613 households in Fulton, of which 25.7% had children under the age of 18 living in them. Of all households, 45.2% were married-couple households, 20.4% were households with a male householder and no spouse or partner present, and 25.9% were households with a female householder and no spouse or partner present. About 33.1% of all households were made up of individuals and 15.1% had someone living alone who was 65 years of age or older.

There were 1,748 housing units, of which 7.7% were vacant. The homeowner vacancy rate was 2.9% and the rental vacancy rate was 8.1%.

Racial composition as of the 2020 census
Race	Number	Percent
White	3,393	93.0%
Black or African American	21	0.6%
American Indian and Alaska Native	7	0.2%
Asian	19	0.5%
Native Hawaiian and Other Pacific Islander	0	0.0%
Some other race	46	1.3%
Two or more races	161	4.4%
Hispanic or Latino (of any race)	143	3.9%

=== 2000 census ===
As of the census of 2000, there were 3,881 people, 1,582 households, and 1,071 families residing in the city. The population density was 1,708.0 inhabitants per square mile (659.5/km^{2}). There were 1,672 housing units at an average density of 735.8 per square mile (284.1/km^{2}). The racial makeup of the city was 97.91% White, 0.59% African American, 0.18% Native American, 0.52% Asian, 0.33% from other races, and 0.46% from two or more races. Hispanic or Latino of any race were 1.26% of the population.

There were 1,582 households, out of which 30.6% had children under the age of 18 living with them, 56.3% were married couples living together, 8.3% had a female householder with no husband present, and 32.3% were non-families. 28.8% of all households were made up of individuals, and 12.6% had someone living alone who was 65 years of age or older. The average household size was 2.37 and the average family size was 2.89.

In the city, the population was spread out, with 23.7% under the age of 18, 7.0% from 18 to 24, 26.7% from 25 to 44, 22.5% from 45 to 64, and 20.1% who were 65 years of age or older. The median age was 40 years. For every 100 females, there were 97.7 males. For every 100 females age 18 and over, there were 94.9 males.

The median income for a household in the city was $37,068, and the median income for a family was $45,134. Males had a median income of $32,359 versus $20,653 for females. The per capita income for the city was $19,845. About 3.5% of families and 5.8% of the population were below the poverty line, including 7.8% of those under age 18 and 3.2% of those age 65 or over.

== Education ==
The school district is River Bend Community Unit District 2.

== Notable people ==
- John R. Huizenga, contributed to the Manhattan Project and the discovery of the elements Einsteinium and Fermium
- Jack Reagan, father of President Ronald Reagan
- Nelle Wilson Reagan, mother of Ronald Reagan
- Paul Rhymer, creator of the radio series Vic and Sade, born in Fulton

== Gallery ==
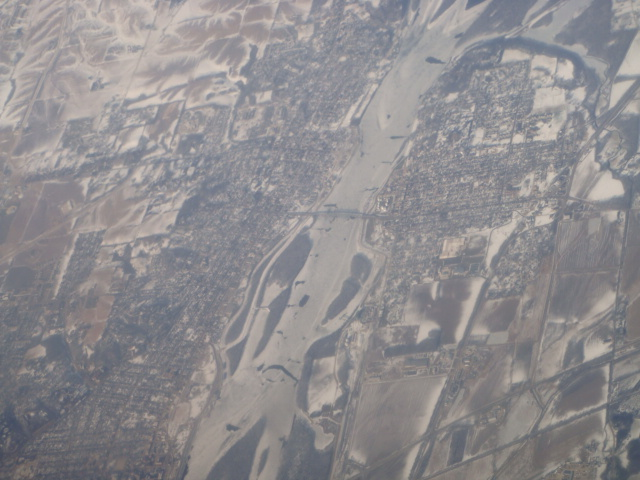
Fulton (right of river) and its neighbor, Clinton, Iowa (left of river) as seen from an airplane

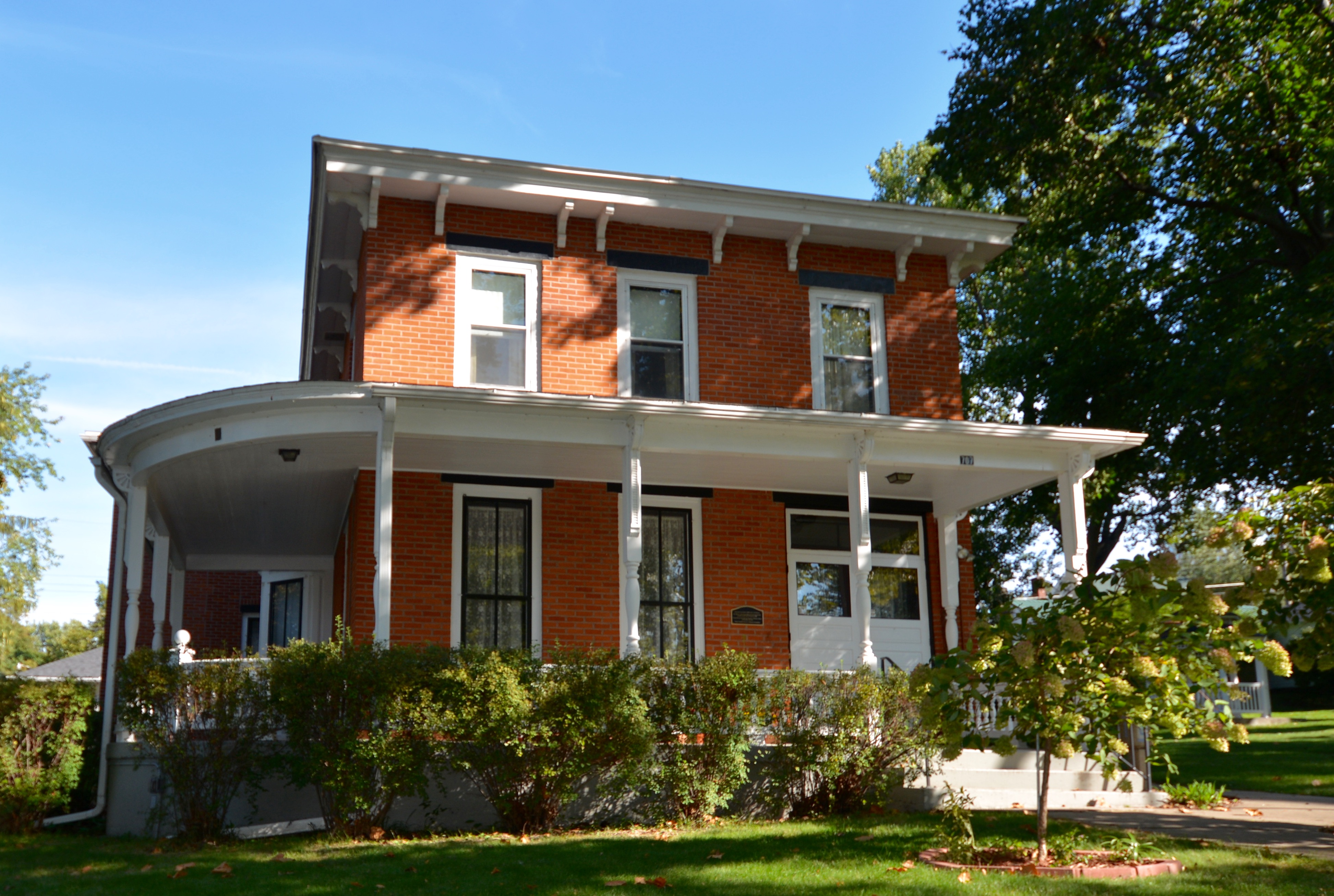
Martin House at 707 10th Avenue

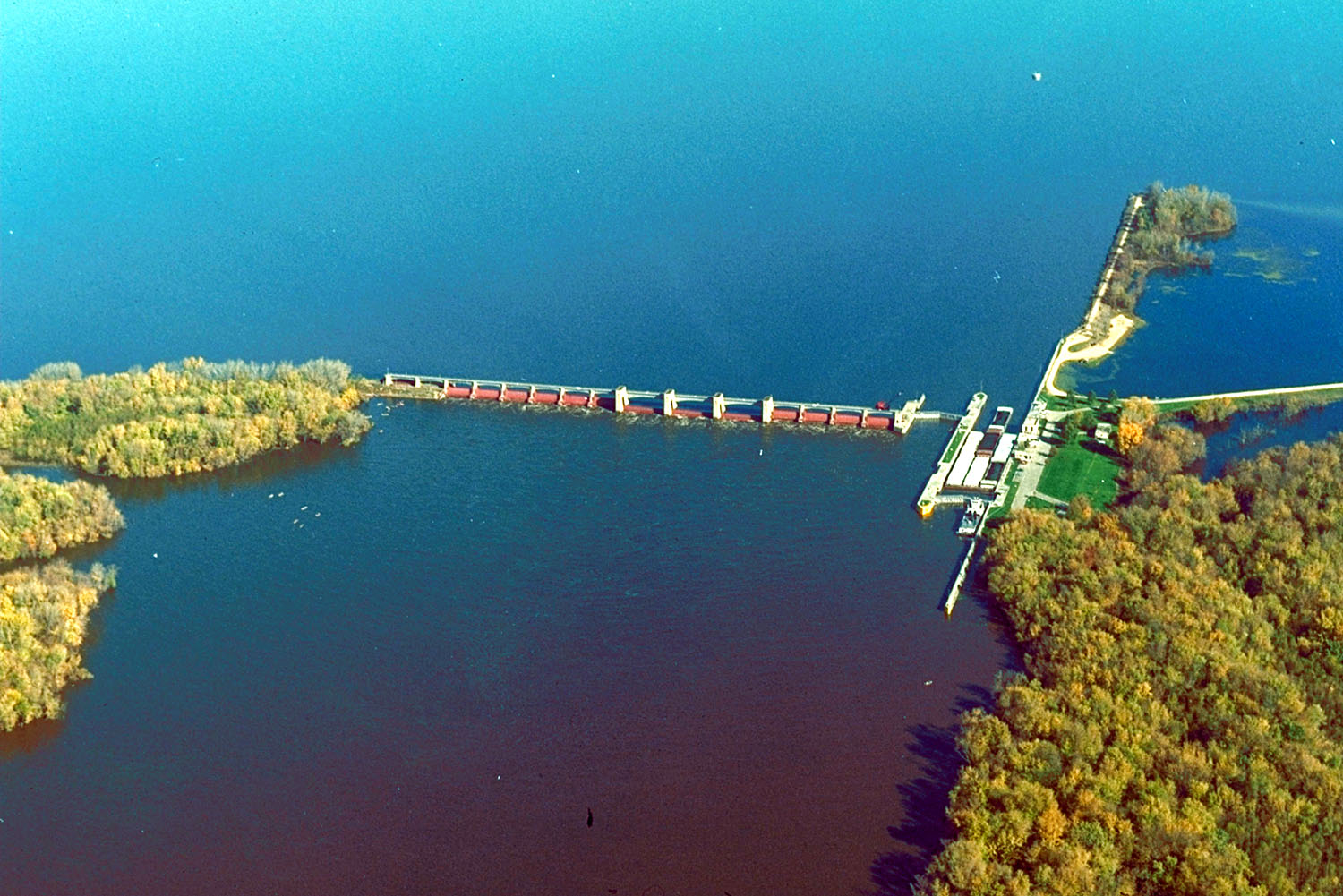
Aerial view of Lock and Dam No. 13, located on the Mississippi River, Clinton, Iowa.

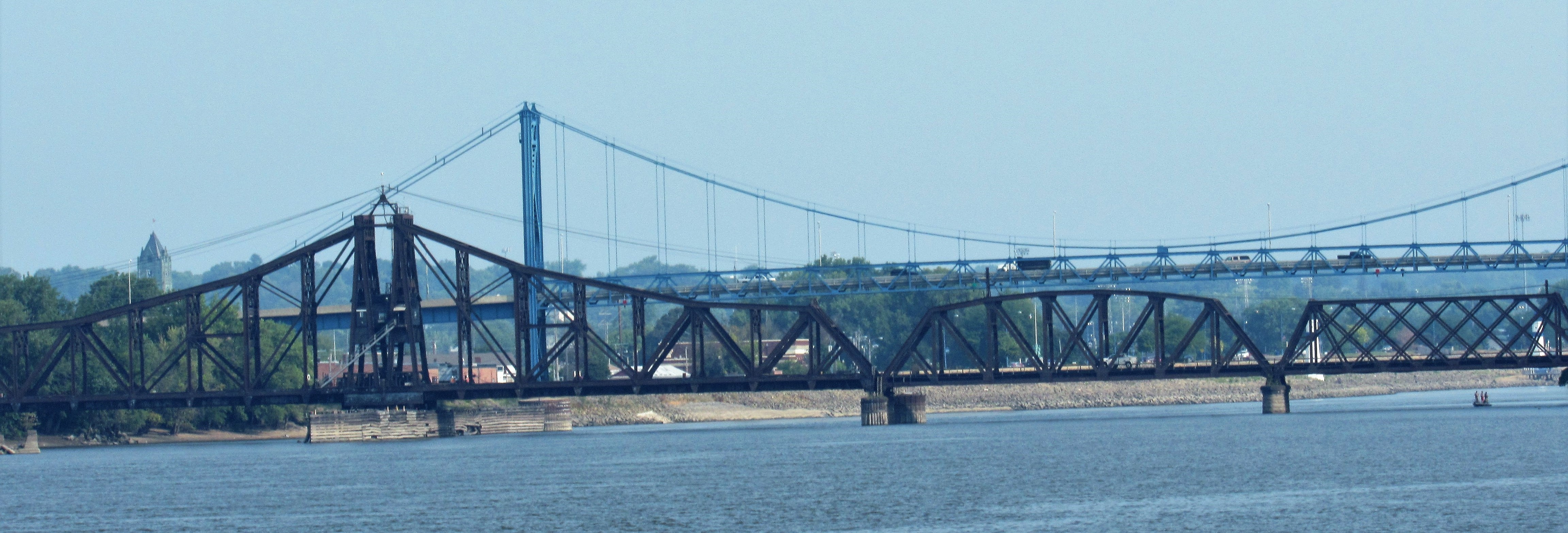
The Clinton Railroad Bridge connects Fulton and Clinton, Iowa.
