= National Register of Historic Places listings in Whiteside County, Illinois =

Location of Whiteside County in Illinois

This is a list of the National Register of Historic Places listings in Whiteside County, Illinois.

This is intended to be a complete list of the properties and districts on the National Register of Historic Places in Whiteside County, Illinois, United States. Latitude and longitude coordinates are provided for many National Register properties and districts; these locations may be seen together in a map.

There are 14 properties and districts listed on the National Register in the county.

This National Park Service list is complete through NPS recent listings posted March 21, 2025.

== Current listings ==
	Name on the Register	Image	Date listed	Location	City or town	Description
1	Albany Mounds Site	Albany Mounds Site	October 9, 1974 (#74000775)	Albany Mounds Trail; 41°46′40″N 90°13′48″W	Albany	
2	First Congregational Church of Sterling	First Congregational Church of Sterling	November 7, 1995 (#95001234)	311 Second Ave. 41°47′21″N 89°41′37″W	Sterling	
3	Fulton Commercial Historic District	Fulton Commercial Historic District	March 7, 2012 (#12000062)	4th St. between 10th & 12th Aves. 41°47′21″N 89°41′37″W	Fulton	
4	Col. Edward N. Kirk House	Col. Edward N. Kirk House	October 9, 1980 (#80001417)	1005 E. 3rd St. 41°47′03″N 89°40′59″W	Sterling	Also known as Paul W. Dillon Home
5	Lock and Dam No. 13 Historic District	Lock and Dam No. 13 Historic District	March 10, 2004 (#04000173)	4999 Lock Rd. 41°53′53″N 90°09′21″W	Fulton	
6	Lyndon Bridge	Lyndon Bridge	May 9, 2003 (#03000353)	South end of 6th Ave. W 41°42′40″N 89°55′27″W	Lyndon	
7	Main Street Historic District	Main Street Historic District	June 3, 1982 (#82002602)	S. Main St. 41°38′00″N 89°47′00″W	Tampico	
8	Malvern Roller Mill	Malvern Roller Mill	August 4, 1995 (#95000988)	18858 Clover Rd. 41°51′54″N 89°53′04″W	Morrison	also known as Appel Mill
9	Martin House	Martin House	December 22, 2014 (#14001068)	707 10th Ave. 41°52′03″N 90°09′43″W	Fulton	
10	McCune Mound and Village Site	McCune Mound and Village Site	August 16, 1979 (#79000873)	Western side of Illinois Route 40, north of Science Ridge Rd. 41°50′00″N 89°42′24″W	Sterling	
11	Morrison Main Street Historic District	Morrison Main Street Historic District	August 25, 2014 (#14000511)	Roughly between Orange & Madison Sts., Lincolnway, UPRR; 41°48′34″N 89°58′00″W	Morrison	
12	Odell Building	Odell Building	December 13, 1996 (#96001475)	202 E. Lincolnway Rd. 41°48′33″N 89°57′52″W	Morrison	
13	Sinnissippi Site	Sinnissippi Site	May 14, 1979 (#79000874)	Sinnissippi Park, off 13th St. 41°47′49″N 89°39′50″W	Sterling	
14	Sterling Masonic Temple	Sterling Masonic Temple	November 7, 1996 (#96001279)	111-113 W. 3rd St. 41°47′17″N 89°41′54″W	Sterling	

== See also ==
- List of National Historic Landmarks in Illinois
- National Register of Historic Places listings in Illinois
