= Odell Building =

- U.S. National Register of Historic Places
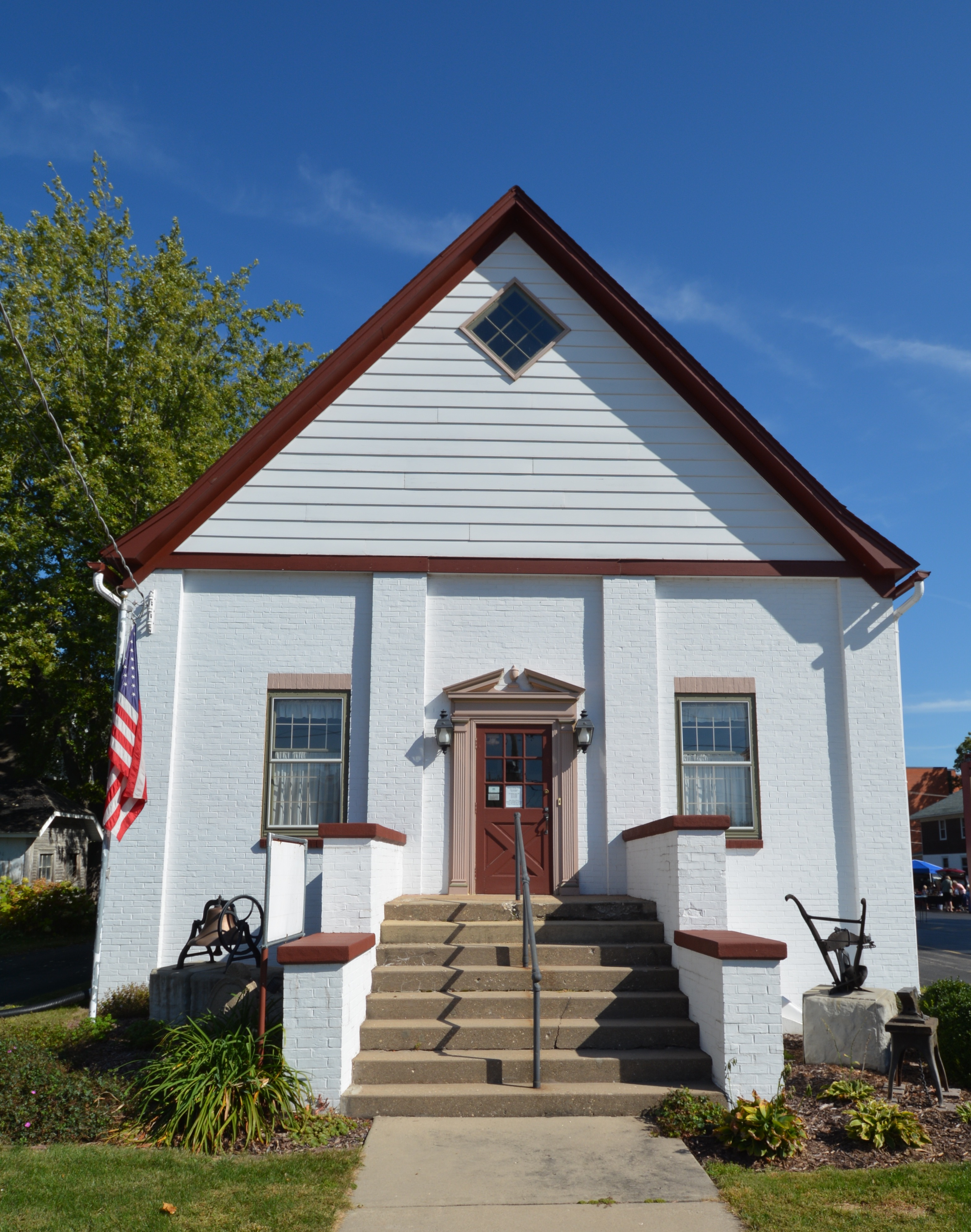

- Location within Illinois
- Location: 202 E. Lincolnway Rd., Morrison, Illinois
- Coordinates: 41°48′33″N 89°57′52″W
- Area: less than one acre
- Built: 1887
- Architectural style: Classical Revival
- NRHP reference No.: 96001475
- Added to NRHP: December 13, 1996

The Odell Building is a historic library and museum located at 202 East Lincolnway Road in Morrison, Illinois. The building was constructed in 1865 and originally served as Morrison's Congregational Church. In 1887, John D. Odell deeded the building to Morrison's library association, which had been established ten years earlier; the library named the building in his honor. The building held both the library's collection of books and a museum that included fossils, animal specimens, artifacts, and several other collections. The library became Morrison's public library in 1905 and remained as such until 1995, when the city built a new library.

The building was added to the National Register of Historic Places on December 13, 1996.
