= Norbert Davis =

American novelist (1909–1949)

- Born: April 18, 1909; Morrison, Illinois, U.S.
- Died: July 28, 1949 (aged 40)
- Writing career
- Genre: Crime fiction

Norbert Harrison Davis (April 18, 1909 - July 28, 1949) was an American crime fiction author.

Norbert Davis was born in Morrison, Illinois, where he grew up. At the end of the 1920s his family moved to Southern California and by the end of 1934 he was to receive his law degree from Stanford University but never bothered to take the bar exam. He started writing short stories for Black Mask in 1932 and lived in the Los Angeles area. He also contributed to Dime Detective, Double Detective, Detective Fiction Weekly, Argosy, and The Saturday Evening Post. From 1943 he published the detective novels The Mouse in the Mountain (Morrow 1943) (also published in paperback under the titles Rendezvous with Fear and Dead Little Rich Girl), Sally's in the Alley (Morrow 1943), Oh, Murderer Mine (Quinn Publishing 1946), all three novels featuring Doan, a private investigator, and Carstairs, a Great Dane. His Murder Picks the Jury (Samuel Curl 1947) was written in collaboration with W. T. Ballard under the authorship 'Harrison Hunt'.

A complete collection of his Max Latin stories from Dime Detective called The Complete Cases of Max Latin was published in 2014 by Altus Press. A complete collection of his Doan and Carstairs stories Doan and Carstairs: Their Complete Cases was published by Altus Press in 2016. 'The Adventures of Max Latin' was put out by Mysterious Press in 1988.

Davis's writing was greatly admired by Ludwig Wittgenstein.

Davis died on July 28, 1949, an apparent suicide following a diagnosis of cancer.

== See also ==
- Detective Story Magazine
- Frances Crane
