= Morrison Main Street Historic District =

Historic district in Illinois, United States

- U.S. National Register of Historic Places
- U.S. Historic district
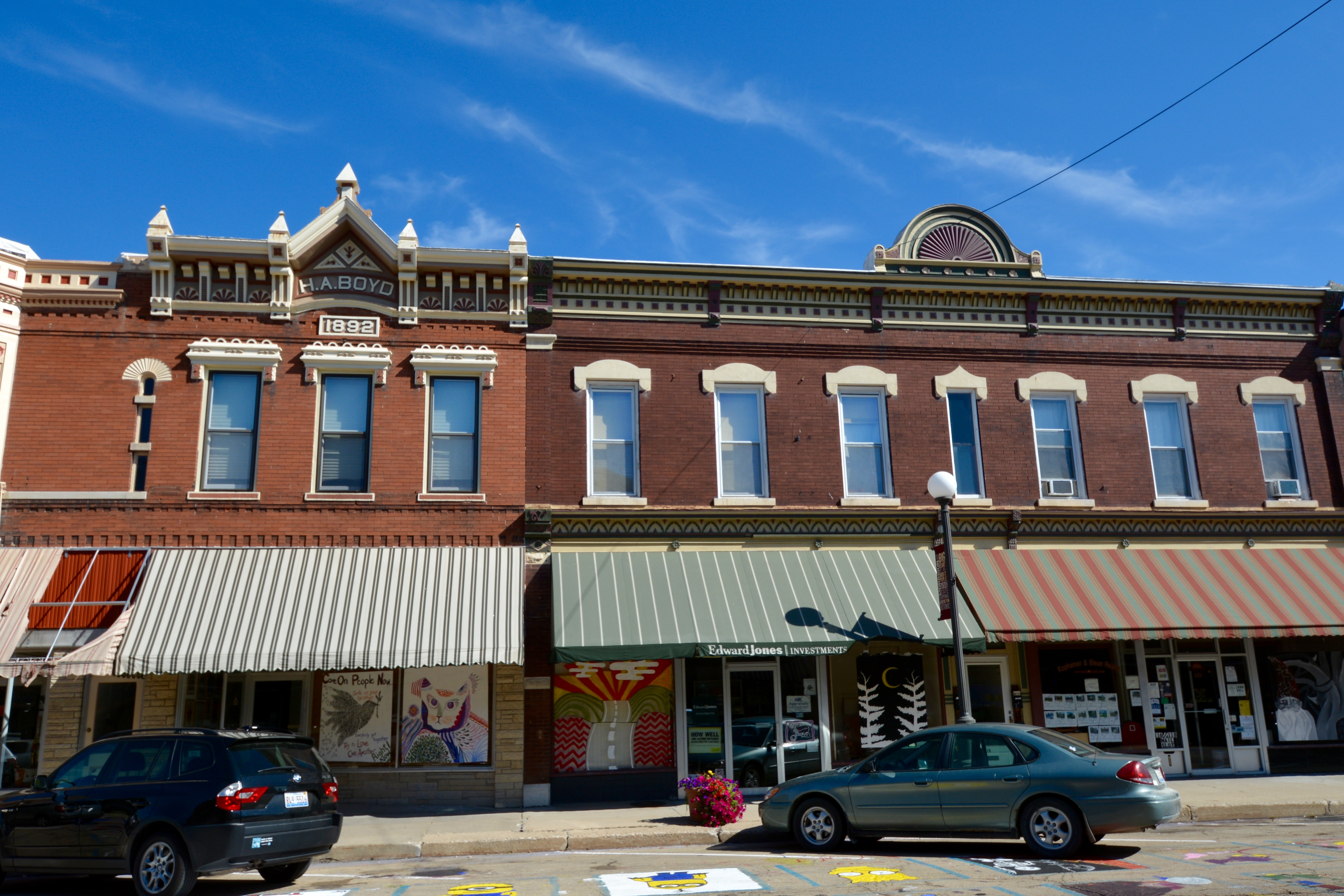
- The H.A. Boyd Building

- Location within Illinois Location within the United States
- Location: Roughly between Orange & Madison Sts., Lincolnway, UPRR, Morrison, Illinois
- Coordinates: 41°48′34″N 89°58′00″W
- NRHP reference No.: 14000511
- Added to NRHP: August 25, 2014

The Morrison Main Street Historic District is a national historic district in Morrison, Illinois. The district encompasses an eight-block commercial area in downtown Morrison and includes 65 buildings, 53 of which are contributing buildings. Development in the district began in the 1850s, the same decade that Morrison was platted and incorporated, and continued through the mid-20th century. The district's growth was tied to the city's primarily agricultural economy and was spurred by its access to the Chicago and North Western Railway in the 19th century and the Lincoln Highway in the 20th. The most prevalent architectural styles in the district are Italianate and High Victorian Eclectic, both of which were most popular in the mid-to-late 19th century; other styles which can be found in the district include Romanesque Revival, Commercial, Classical Revival, Modernist, and various vernacular designs.

The district was added to the National Register of Historic Places on August 25, 2014.
