= Ann Nardulli =

American endocrinologist

Ann M. Nardulli
- Born: Ann Wannemacher; November 28, 1948; Morrison, Illinois
- Died: June 27, 2018 (aged 69)
- Education: University of Illinois at Urbana–Champaign
- Occupation: endocrinologist
- Known for: Breast cancer research
- Spouse: Peter Nardulli
- Children: Marc Nardulli and Beth Conlon

Ann M. Nardulli (November 28, 1948 – June 27, 2018) was an American endocrinologist known for her research into the role of estrogen in breast cancer.

== Biography ==
Ann Wannemacher was born in 1948 in Morrison, Illinois, to Rita and Rudolph Wannemacher of Hooppole.

She received a Bachelor of Science degree in education at Northern Illinois University and taught elementary school in Addison before earning master's and doctoral degrees at the University of Illinois at Urbana–Champaign and completing postdoctoral work there in biochemistry.

Nardulli joined the university's lab run by Benita Katzenellenbogen, and eventually became a professor of the Department of Molecular and Integrative Physiology with her own lab, teaching and studying the effects of estrogen in women.

=== Notable research ===
Nardulli's work concentrated on the specifics of estrogen activities, including the proteins it binds with, and the mechanisms that the hormone uses to manipulate chromatin and DNA. According to Katzenellenbogen,

"Dr. Nardulli did pioneering work that identified the protein complexes with which the estrogen receptor associated, many previously unknown, and she and her laboratory associates went on to elucidate how these proteins collaborated with and modulated the activities of the estrogen receptor in breast cancer cells and tumors."

Among the research topics explored by her team were the plasma membrane proteins and their effect on breast cancer cells as well as the proteins that these cells secrete. Later research focused on the brain and estrogen action in it.

At the university, Nardulli "was particularly fond of spending time with the Hormone Chixx, a group of women from across campus who studied the effects of hormones in the body. She discovered that introducing students to the wonders of human physiology and endocrinology was extremely rewarding and was recognized for her teaching excellence."

=== Advocacy ===
As an active member of the Endocrine Society, she served as "chair of the Advocacy and Public Outreach Core Committee and visited Washington, D.C., numerous times to meet with legislators on Capitol Hill and lobby for increased scientific research funding." She was also a member of the society's Scientific Statements Task Force and a member of the editorial board for the academic journal Endocrine Reviews and Molecular Endocrinology.

Nardulli died at her home of cancer in June 27, 2018., aged 69.

== Select publications ==
- Ziegler, Y. S.; Moresco, J. J.; Tu, P. G.; Yates Jr, 3rd; Nardulli, A. M. (2014). "Plasma membrane proteomics of human breast cancer cell lines identifies potential targets for breast cancer diagnosis and treatment". PLOS ONE. 9 (7) e102341. Bibcode:2014PLoSO...9j2341Z. doi:10.1371/journal.pone.0102341. PMC 4100819. PMID 25029196.
- Dietrich, Alicia K.; Humphreys, Gwendolyn I.; Nardulli, Ann M. (2013). "17β-Estradiol increases expression of the oxidative stress response and DNA repair protein apurinic endonuclease (Ape1) in the cerebral cortex of female mice following hypoxia". The Journal of Steroid Biochemistry and Molecular Biology. 138: 410–420. doi:10.1016/j.jsbmb.2013.07.007. PMC 3825811. PMID 23907014.
- Yuan, L.; Dietrich, A. K.; Nardulli, A. M. (2014). "17β-Estradiol alters oxidative stress response protein expression and oxidative damage in the uterus". Molecular and Cellular Endocrinology. 382 (1): 218–226. doi:10.1016/j.mce.2013.09.023. PMC 3900311. PMID 24103313.
- Shim, J.; Humphreys, G. I.; Venkatesan, B. M.; Munz, J. M.; Zou, X.; Sathe, C.; Schulten, K.; Kosari, F.; Nardulli, A. M.; Vasmatzis, G.; Bashir, R. (2013). "Detection and quantification of methylation in DNA using solid-state nanopores". Scientific Reports. 3: 1389. Bibcode:2013NatSR...3E1389S. doi:10.1038/srep01389. PMC 3593219. PMID 23474808.
- Schultz-Norton, J. R.; Ziegler, Y. S.; Nardulli, A. M. (2011). "ERα-associated protein networks". Trends in Endocrinology and Metabolism. 22 (4): 124–9. doi:10.1016/j.tem.2010.11.005. PMID 21371903. S2CID 28219981.
- Curtis, C. D.; Thorngren, D. L.; Nardulli, A. M. (2010). "Immunohistochemical analysis of oxidative stress and DNA repair proteins in normal mammary and breast cancer tissues". BMC Cancer. 10: 9. doi:10.1186/1471-2407-10-9. PMC 2830938. PMID 20064251.
- Curtis CD, Thorngren DL, Ziegler YS, Sarkeshik A, Yates JR, Nardulli AM 2009 Apurinic/apyrimidinic endonuclease 1 alters estrogen receptor activity and estrogen responsive gene expression. Mol Endocrinol 23:1346-1359.
- Bonéy-Montoya, J.; Ziegler, Y. S.; Curtis, C. D.; Montoya, J. A.; Nardulli, A. M. (2010). "Long-range transcriptional control of progesterone receptor gene expression". Molecular Endocrinology. 24 (2): 346–58. doi:10.1210/me.2009-0429. PMC 2817601. PMID 19952285.
