= Lake Carlton (Illinois) =

- Location within Illinois Location within the United States
- Location: Whiteside County, Illinois
- Coordinates: 41°50′42″N 89°57′56″W
- Type: reservoir
- Basin countries: United States
- Surface area: 78 acres (32 ha)
- Average depth: 12 ft (3.7 m)
- Max. depth: 27 ft (8.2 m)
- Shore length^{1}: 2.9 mi (4.7 km)
- Surface elevation: 659 ft (201 m)
- ^{1} Shore length is not a well-defined measure.

Lake Carlton is a reservoir in the Morrison-Rockwood State Park in Whiteside County in northern Illinois.

The lake is managed for sport fishing, including largemouth and rock bass, black crappie, channel catfish, redear sunfish, bluegill, muskie and walleye.
