= Gertrude Foster Brown =

American concert pianist, teacher, and suffragette (1867–1956)

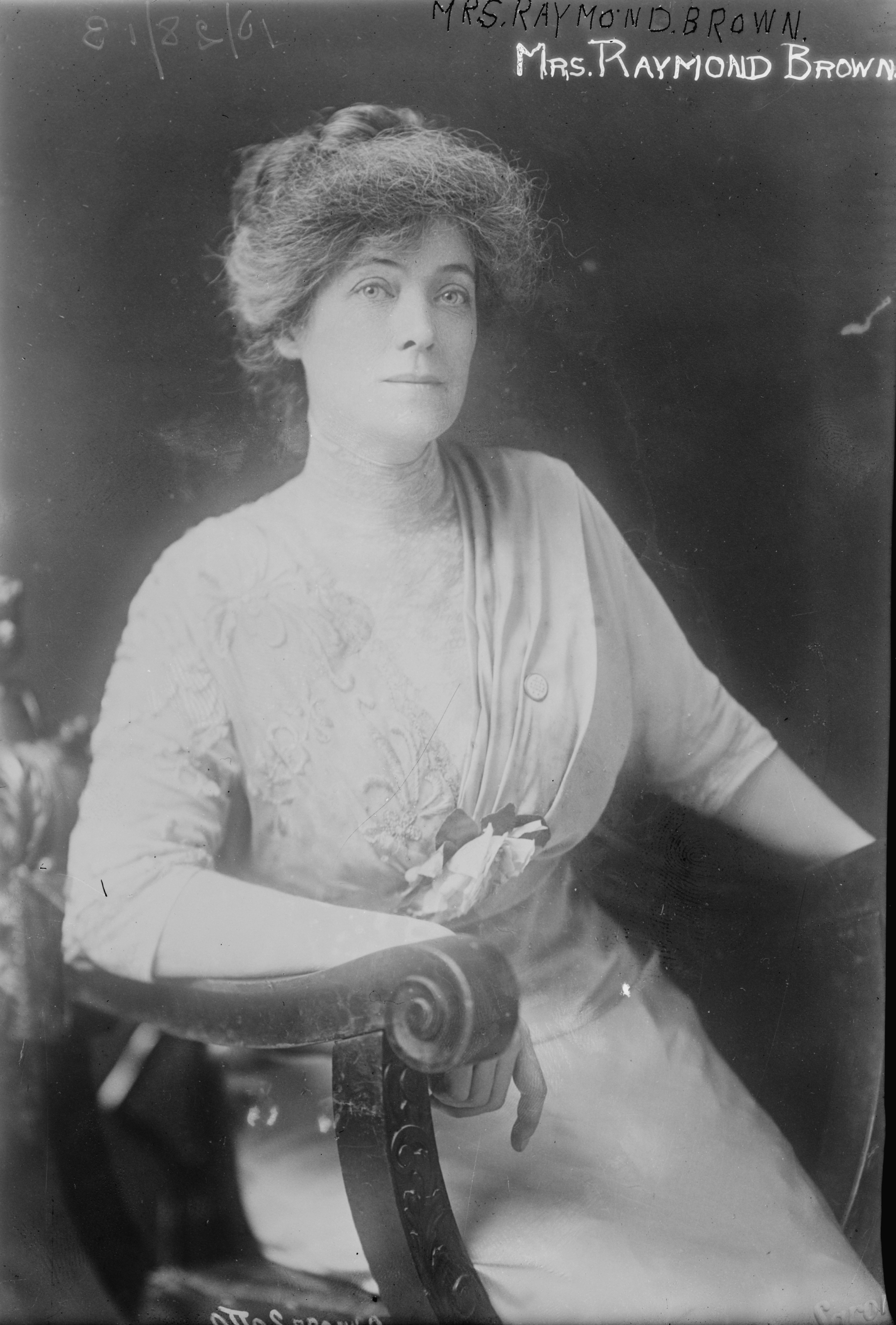
- Born: Gertrude Foster; July 29, 1867; Morrison, Illinois, U.S.
- Died: March 1, 1956 (aged 88); Westport, Connecticut, U.S.
- Spouse: Arthur Raymond Brown
- Parent(s): William Charles Foster, Lydia Anne Drake

External videos
- "Listen to a 101-Year-Old Clarion Call for Women's Suffrage Preserved in Shellac", NYPR Archives & Preservation

Gertrude Foster Brown (Mrs. Arthur Raymond Brown, July 29, 1867 – March 1, 1956) was a concert pianist, teacher, and suffragist. Following the passage of women suffrage in New York State in 1917, and pending passage of the Nineteenth Amendment to the United States Constitution, Brown wrote Your Vote and How to Use It, published in 1918. She was Director-General of the Women's Overseas Hospitals in France, founded by suffragists, in 1918. In addition to her work in the New York suffrage movement, she helped to found the National League of Women Voters. She was the Managing Director of the Woman's Journal from 1921-1931.

== Early years ==
Gertrude Foster was born on July 29, 1867, in Morrison, Illinois, to William Charles Foster and Lydia Anne Drake.

Foster studied piano at the New England Conservatory of Music in Boston, Massachusetts. She finished a four-year course in two years, graduating in August 1885. After teaching for a year in Dayton, Ohio, she went to Europe, studying with Xaver Scharwenka in Berlin and Élie-Miriam Delaborde in Paris between 1886 and 1889.

== Performing career ==
On January 25, 1889, Foster made her professional debut as a pianist with the Philharmonic Orchestra in Berlin. By July 1889, she had returned to the United States, joining the Chicago Conservatory of Music, where she taught and performed until 1896.

In August 1893, Gertrude Foster married Arthur Raymond Brown (1865-1944), an artist and advertising executive who worked for the Chicago Evening Post. In 1896, they moved to New York City, where Raymond Brown worked for the Hawley Advertising Company. He was known as an illustrator, author and art editor. Gertrude Foster Brown continued to play and performed lecture recitals on Richard Wagner and his operas.

== Suffrage career ==
Gertrude Foster Brown organized a Woman Suffrage Study Club in New York in 1909, which later became part of Carrie Chapman Catt's Woman Suffrage Party. Brown attended the National American Woman Suffrage Association (NAWSA) convention in 1910. She was elected president of the New York State Woman Suffrage Association in 1913. Among her activities were the organization of suffrage parades in New York City. How It Feels to Be the Husband of a Suffragette, which was published anonymously in 1915, has been attributed to her husband.

Brown was active in campaigning in New York for the passage of women's suffrage. Victory there on November 6, 1917, was an important step towards the passage of the Nineteenth Amendment to the United States Constitution. Following the passage of women suffrage in New York State in 1917, and pending passage of the Nineteenth Amendment, Brown wrote Your Vote and How to Use It. It was published in February 1918 by Harper & Brothers, and was endorsed by the New York State Women Suffrage Party. In it she encouraged New York women to be good citizens and exercise their new ability to vote. Dealing with civics "from the standpoint of the woman voter", women were encouraged to "regard their vote as a trust to be used not to advance partisan politics, but to further human welfare."

Your Vote and How to Use It was one of a number of "citizenship manuals" educating women in their new rights and responsibilities and encouraging them to take their new obligations seriously. Some of its materials were also used as the basis of a correspondence course for women voters, distributed by the New York State Women Suffrage Party. The book itself was listed as suggested civics reading for Girl Guides who wanted to earn a Citizen's Badge, in the 1920 guides handbook Scouting for Girls.

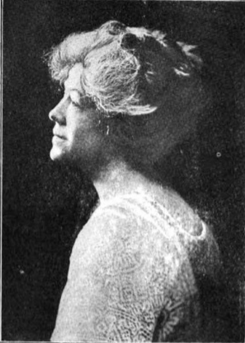
Gertrude Foster Brown (1919)

In 1918, when the suffrage movement organized the Women's Overseas Hospitals in France, Gertrude Foster Brown became Director-General, serving in France. Seventy-four women staff were sent over from the United States to the hospital.

Brown helped to found the National League of Women Voters, serving as chairperson of the group that drafted its organizational plan. "Simple, direct, workable, it blazed a wide trail free of difficulties." Brown was commended enthusiastically for her efforts.

She also was involved in the New York Woman's City Club. From 1921 to 1931, Brown was general manager of The Woman's Journal, renamed The Woman Citizen. Founded in 1870 by Lucy Stone and Henry B. Blackwell, the journal was published until 1931 and the Great Depression.

The Browns traveled in Europe and North Africa during the 1930s. Gertrude Foster Brown became a vocal supporter of the League of Nations. During World War II, she was active in the Women's Action Committee for Victory and Lasting Peace. In 1945, she represented the committee at the founding United Nations Conference on International Organization in San Francisco, California.

Among her papers is an autobiographical account of her life, Suffrage and Music: My First Eighty Years.

== Later life ==
The Browns had no children. Raymond Brown died on April 30, 1944, at their New York apartment at 1883 Imperial Flats—Nos. 55-57 East 76th Street. He had been nursed during his illness by his wife. Gertrude continued to live in the apartment, and organized a chamber music group that played there. Gertrude died on March 1, 1956, in Westport, Connecticut.

== See also ==
- History of feminism
- List of suffragists and suffragettes
