= Morrison-Rockwood State Park =

State park in Illinois, United States

- IUCN category III (natural monument or feature)
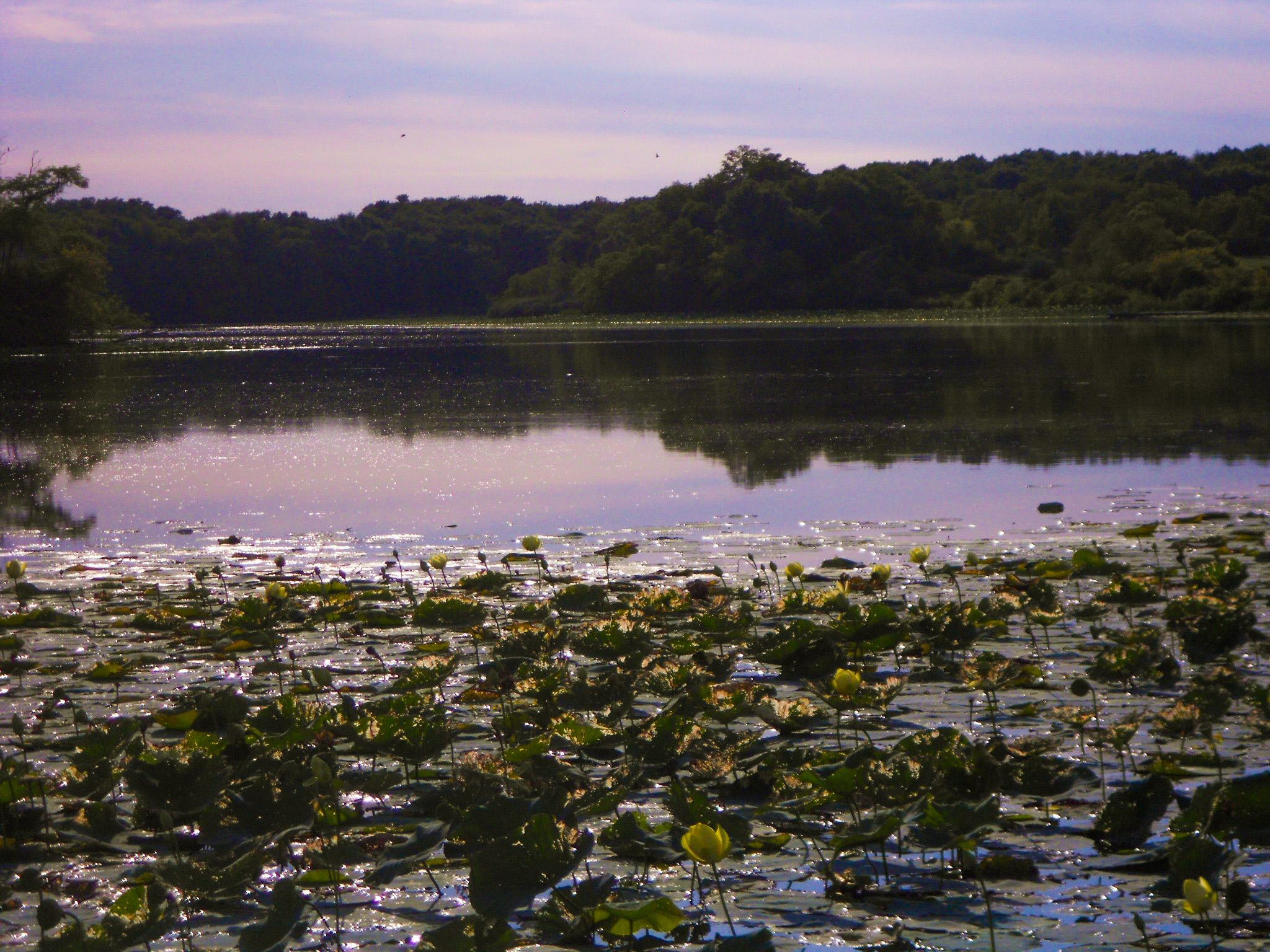
- Morrison Rockwood State Park

- Location within Illinois Location within the United States
- Location: Whiteside County, Illinois, USA
- Nearest city: Morrison, Illinois
- Coordinates: 41°50′57″N 89°57′55″W
- Area: 1,164 acres (471 ha)
- Established: 1971
- Governing body: Illinois Department of Natural Resources

Morrison Rockwood State Park is an Illinois state park on 1,164 acres (471 ha) located north of Morrison in Whiteside County, Illinois, United States. The park was established in 1971 and opened for day use that same year. It is named after the nearby Rock Creek and the heavily wooded park area "Rockwood". Lake Carlton is located within the park. Lake Carlton is a watershed impoundment constructed in 1969 by building a 38-foot (12 m) high, 1,800-foot (550 m) long earthen dam across a tributary stream to Rock Creek. The lake was named in memory of L. Carlton Anderson, a local citizen who promoted the park and was an important civic and conservation leader.
