= Sterling Masonic Temple =

- U.S. National Register of Historic Places
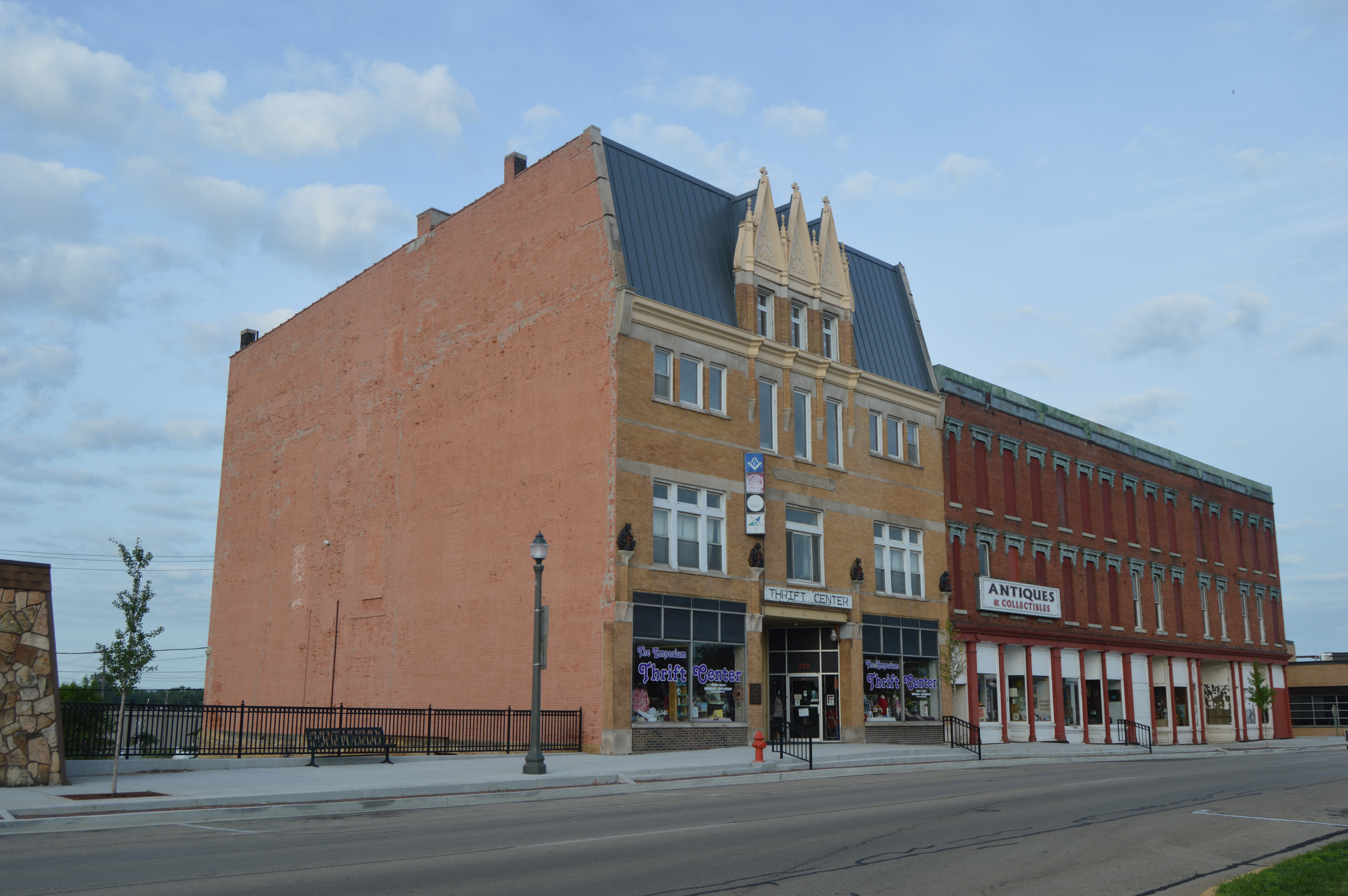
- Eastern side and front, with an adjacent building to the right

- Location within Illinois Location within the United States
- Location: 111-113 W. 3rd St., Sterling, Illinois
- Coordinates: 41°47′16″N 89°41′52″W
- Area: less than one acre
- Built: 1899-1900
- Architect: Ashby, George W.
- Architectural style: Masonic Temple
- NRHP reference No.: 96001279
- Added to NRHP: November 7, 1996

The Sterling Masonic Temple is a historic Masonic building located at 111-113 West 3rd Street in Sterling, Illinois. The edifice was constructed in 1899–1900 to be the new headquarters for the city's Masonic lodge, as its former meeting place had burned down in 1898. The lodge, formally known as the Rock River Lodge Number 612 A.F. & A.M., first met in 1869 and was the town's second chapter of the Masons. Architect George W. Ashby designed the lodge's new building in the Chateauesque style. The building's design includes a steep mansard roof with equally steep dormers adorned with pinnacles, buttresses topped by ornamental griffins, and a brick and stone exterior. The Masons met on the third story, as Masonic meeting rooms were typically elevated for secrecy; the lower two floors were rented to businesses.

The building was listed on the National Register of Historic Places on November 7, 1996. The Masonic lodge still meets in the building, though its membership has declined dramatically since the 1960s.
