= Malvern Roller Mill =

- U.S. National Register of Historic Places
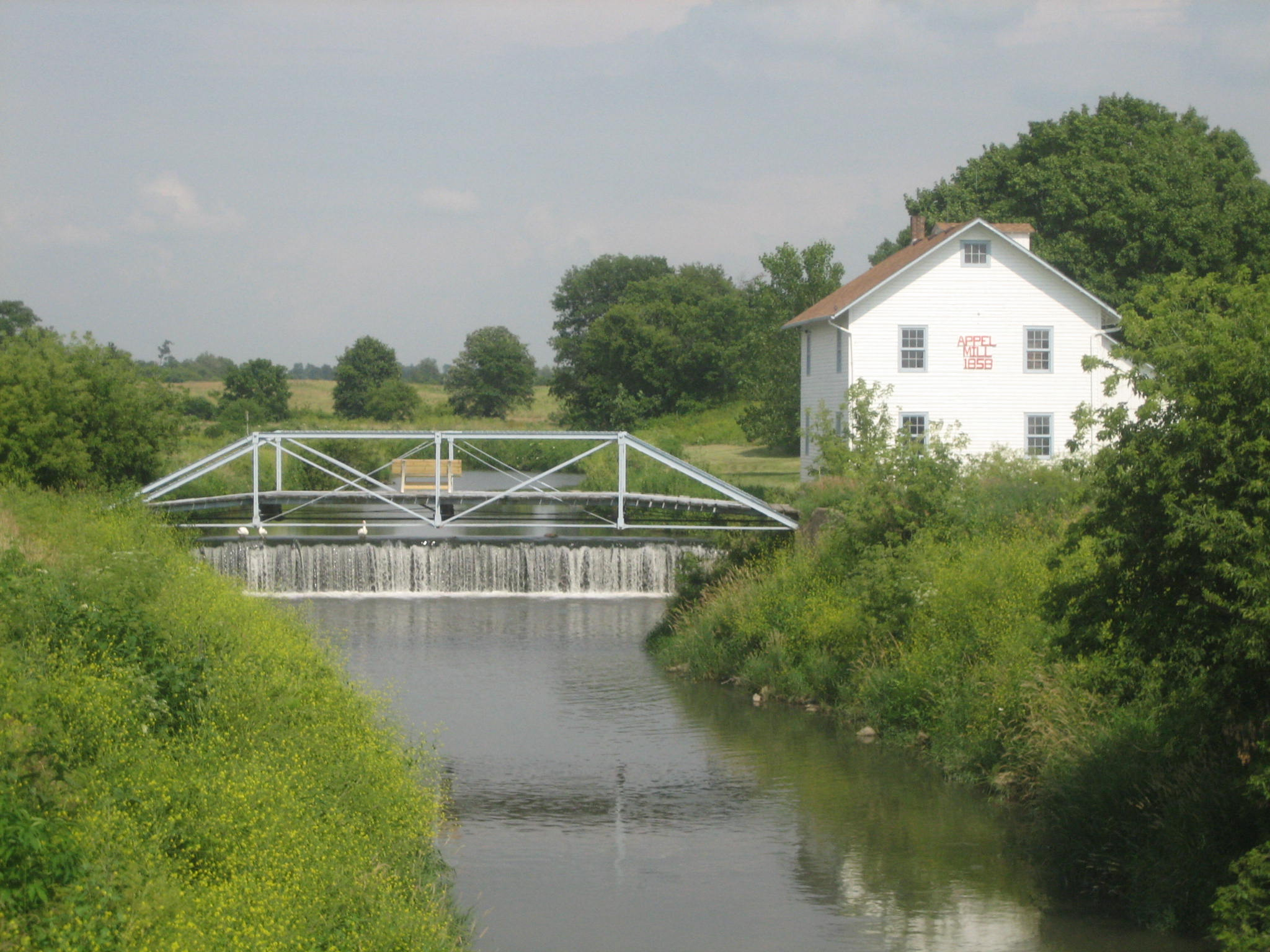
- Location: Whiteside County, Illinois
- Nearest city: Malvern; Morrison
- Coordinates: 41°51′48″N 89°52′55″W
- Area: less than one acre
- Built: c. 1845-1853
- NRHP reference No.: 95000988
- Added to NRHP: August 4, 1995

The Malvern Roller Mill, also known as Appel Mill and Malvern Milling Company, is a 19th-century grist mill located near the unincorporated village of Malvern, Illinois, in rural Whiteside County, north of Morrison, Illinois, United States. The original mill on the site, built by 1853, was destroyed by a flood and the present mill was erected in 1858. The mill's first owner was William P. Hiddleson who operated the mill until he sold to Benjamin Hough in 1871. The mill changed hands over the years until it landed under the control of George Appel in 1892. The Appel family closed the mill in 1942 but it remained in their family until 1985. The Malvern Roller Mill was added to the U.S. National Register of Historic Places in 1995.

== History ==
The property where Malvern Roller Mill is located was purchased by William P. Hiddleson on October 1, 1845. No records exist to indicate when Hiddleson built the mill on the east bank of Rock Creek in Clyde Township, Whiteside County but it is known that the country mill was in place by 1853. In addition to the mill building Hiddleson built a dam across the creek. The original mill was destroyed by a flood along the Rock Creek and the current mill building constructed in 1858. On September 27, 1871, the mill complex was sold to Benjamin Hough and became known as Hough's Mill. Hough sold the mill to Jacob Geyer on January 6, 1875, and Geyer's son later owned the property. During S.L. Geyer's ownership the mill became known as Geyer's Mill. Balthaser Schriner bought the mill on April 27, 1887.

The original mill was powered by a vertical waterwheel; the mill, at the time, utilized buhrstones to grind the meal. On the nearby property, discarded buried buhrstones can be found. In the 1870s or 1880s the mill owners added a 20 horsepower (15 kW) turbine to help the mill keep up with advances in technology. In 1888 Schriner installed a set of rollers, manufactured by Barkley and Leads Machine Company of Moline, Illinois, at the demand of his mill operator, Amos Greater, who had threatened to quit absent the rollers.

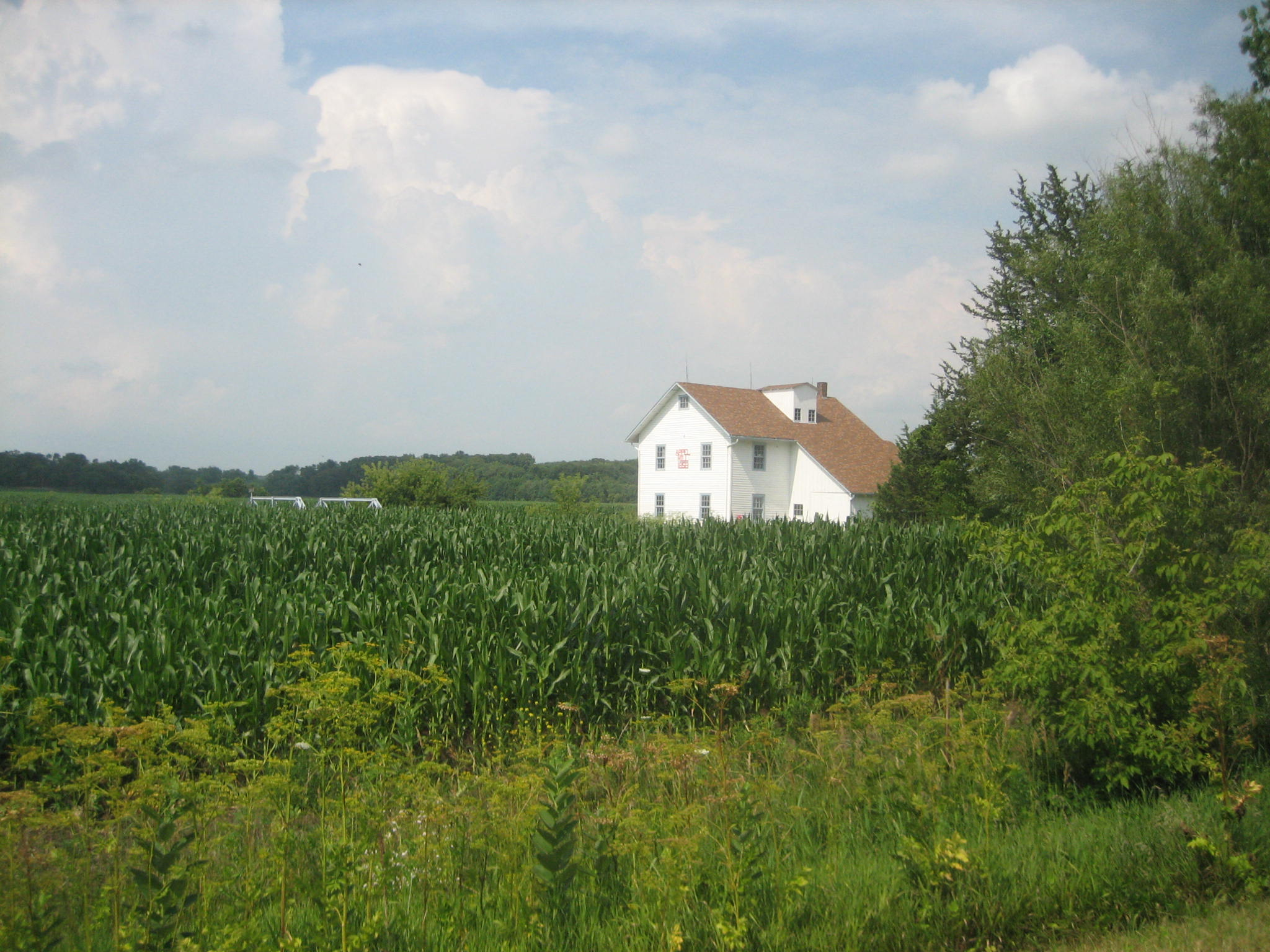
The mill building was constructed in 1858 after a flood destroyed the original grist mill.

Millwright George Appel, from Sterling, Illinois, leased the mill, adjacent land and buildings in 1892. Appel, a recent German immigrant to the United States, oat huller and made oatmeal, corn meal, flour, and bran at the mill with his son. The mill, properly known as the Malvern Roller Mill or Malvern Milling Company, became known as the Appel Mill during this time period. The Appel family held the mill from its purchase in 1892 until 1985. Flour and meal, marketed under the Malvern Roller Mill name, was marketed in Sterling, shipped out the railroad and sold in far away location such as New York City and England.

John Appel took control of the mill in 1926 and operated it until its closure in 1942. During Appel's last years running the mill he limited his customers to nearby farmers who needed grains custom ground for animal feed. He closed the mill due to shortages caused by World War II.

== Mill ==
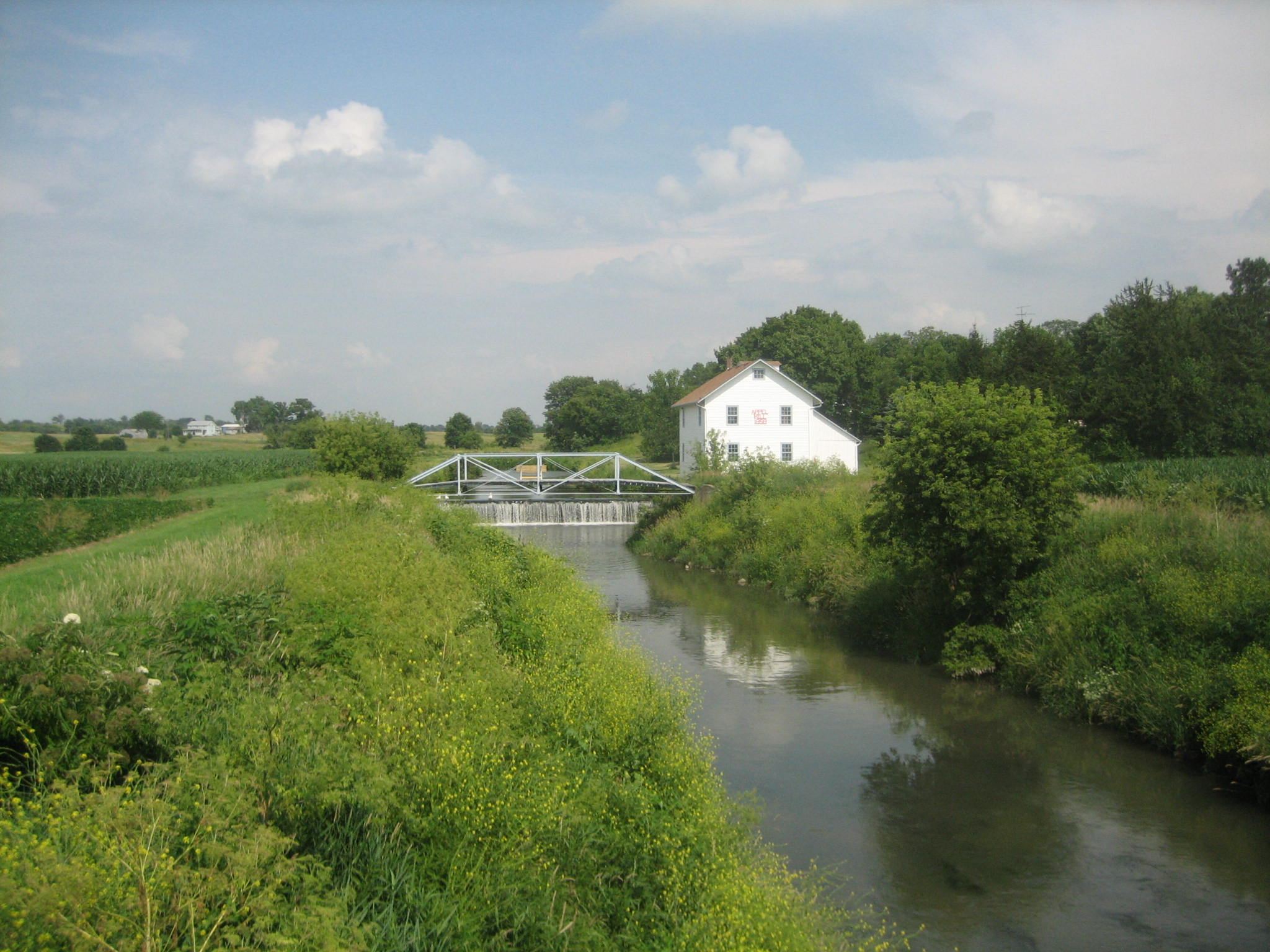
The Malvern Roller Mill sits along the southeast bank of Rock Creek with a truss bridge to its west.

The Malvern Roller Mill is a country grist mill located in Whiteside County, Illinois along Old Clover Road. The mill building sits about 300 feet (91 m) from the present-day roadway, Felton Road, which was rerouted in 1992. The mill is near the small northeastern Whiteside County community of Malvern, about nine miles (14 km) northeast of Morrison, Illinois. The mill building sits on the south bank of Rock Creek, a tributary of the Rock River, and to its northeast is a stone faced dam. The dam stretches the 80 to 90 feet (24 to 27 m) across the Rock Creek, it is about 5 feet (1.5 m) thick and was reinforced with concrete during the 1950s. The 1858 mill building is of studded wall construction. The rectangular-shaped building is 26 1/2 feet (8.1 m) by 38 feet (12 m). To the west of the mill building is a circa 1890 Pratt truss bridge.

== Significance ==
The Malvern Roller Mill was added to the U.S. National Register of Historic Places on August 4, 1995, because of its local significance in the areas of industry and commerce. The building operated as a grinding mill for farmers and the nearby community of Malvern from its construction until it closed in 1942. It is the only known mill in northwestern Illinois that retains all of its equipment for an all roller and no grindstone process. If the millrace and turbines are clean the mill could operate as it did when it was in business. The Malvern Roller Mill provides a glimpse at the complexity of late 19th century milling operations.
