= Morrison, Illinois =

- City
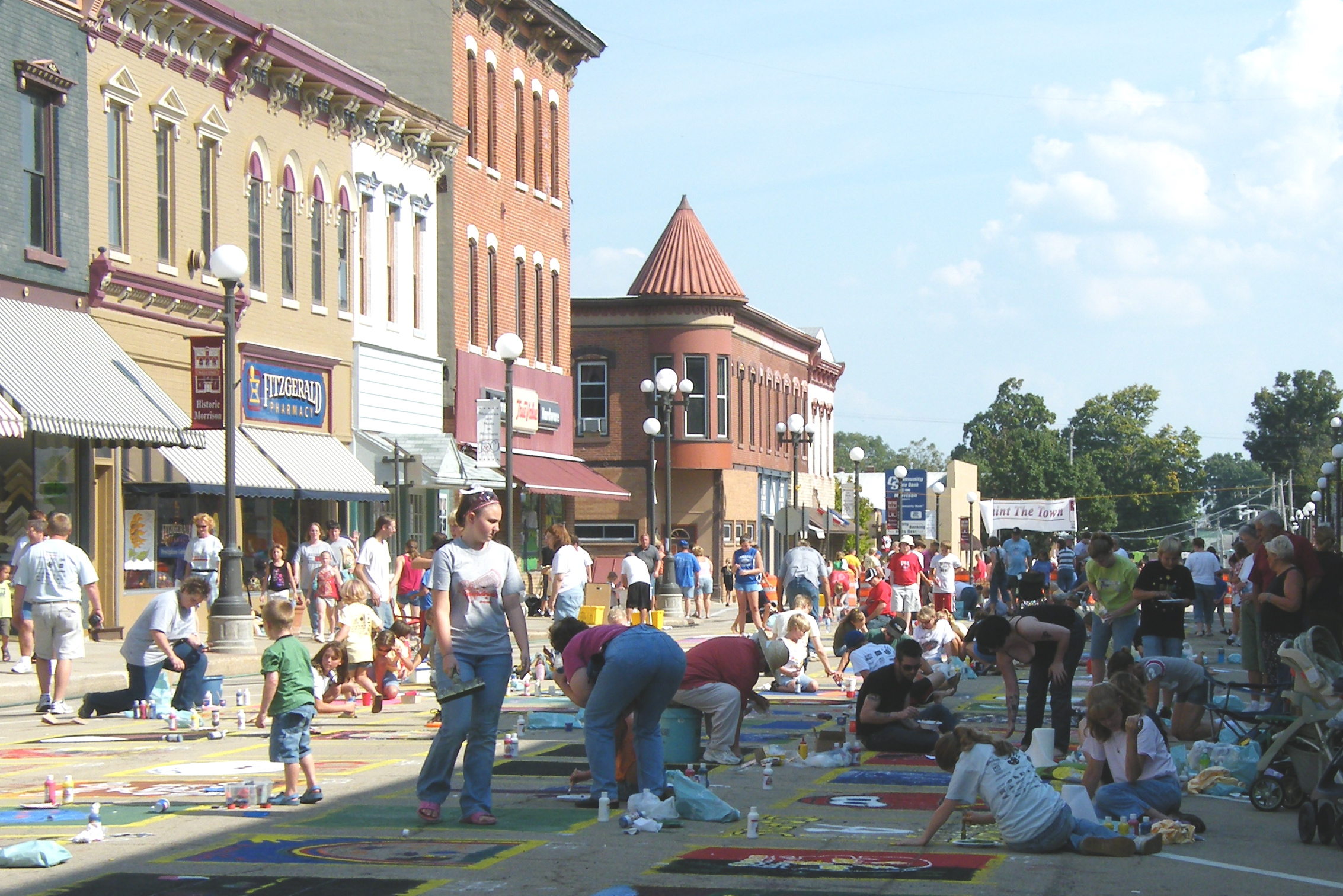
- Paint the Town, Morrison's signature event
- Interactive map of Morrison, Illinois
- Location within Illinois Location within the United States
- Coordinates: 41°48′28″N 89°57′42″W
- Country: United States
- State: Illinois
- County: Whiteside

Area
  - Total: 2.52 sq mi (6.52 km^{2})
  - Land: 2.52 sq mi (6.52 km^{2})
  - Water: 0 sq mi (0.00 km^{2})
- Elevation: 656 ft (200 m)

Population (2020)
  - Total: 4,085
  - Density: 1,622.5/sq mi (626.45/km^{2})
- Time zone: UTC-6 (CST)
  - Summer (DST): UTC-5 (CDT)
- ZIP code: 61270
- Area code: 815
- FIPS code: 17-50530
- GNIS feature ID: 2395409
- Website: www.morrisonil.org

Morrison is a town and the county seat of Whiteside County, Illinois, United States. As of the 2020 census, Morrison had a population of 4,085. It is located on the Historic Lincoln Highway, the nation's first transcontinental highway and in Morrison was the site of two concrete "seedling miles", which served as prototypes of what an improved highway could do for the nation.

== History ==
In 1854, Lyman Johnson and H. S. Vroom were already in what would become the City of Morrison as contractors and builders for the Air-line railroad, now the Union Pacific Railroad. Johnson and Vroom, along with several other entrepreneurs, acquired the land that would surround the rail station that was planned here. They managed the work of surveyor W.S. Wilkinson in the layout of the future town in 1855. Among these entrepreneurs was W.H. Van Epps. Lyman Johnson decided to call the town Morrison, in honor of Charles Morrison, a friend of Van Epps and a wealthy merchant from New York, who promised financial support in the way of loans for the town's development. Shortly thereafter, Morrison suffered severe financial losses and he was unable to participate, yet his name remained.

== Industry ==
Refrigerator manufacturer, Illinois Refrigerator Company, was organized in 1892 by Edward A. Smith, J.B. Markey, George Brown, F.L. Sands, and F.R. Beals. Later it added school furniture to its line: Columbia School Equipment Company, which was a subsidiary of the Illinois Refrigerator Company. In 1914, Illinois Refrigerator Company acquired equipment to manufacture stoves, establishing the Summit Stove Company. Two additional school furniture companies formed the Illinois Seating Company and built a new factory in Morrison. The Morris and Rich Toy Factory of Sterling, IL moved to Morrison in 1928, locating in part of the Illinois Refrigerator Company building. In November 1929, a fire damaged two warehouses owned by Illinois Refrigerator Company, Rich Manufacturing Company, and Columbia School Equipment Company. The fire destroyed over 4,000 refrigerators and $35,000 worth of toys, including five or more carloads, which were on the nearby railroad tracks. The total loss was estimated at $500,000. By April 1932, the refrigerator company was bankrupt. Soon after, a new corporation was formed: Rich Illinois Manufacturing Company. The company made wood and metal refrigerators, electric refrigerators, toys, furniture, wood ware, and wood and metal fabricated buildings. In 1934, The City Ice and Fuel Company of Cleveland, OH, which operated under the name Ice Cooling Appliance Corporation (ICA), purchased the plant. The toy factory, Rich Illinois Manufacturing, moved to Clinton, Iowa. In 1954, ICA was sold to American Air Filter Company, Inc. at Louisville, Kentucky, which had consolidated with Herman Nelson Corporation of Moline, Illinois. In 1957, the Herman Nelson division established a factory in Morrison to manufacture air blowers, small portable heaters, and air conditioners, which eventually closed in 1966, moving to Brownsville, Tennessee.

General Electric started its Morrison plant in 1949, as a branch of the Schenectady, New York department. It became the Appliance Control Department in 1952 and was one of the first units to be established in a decentralization program. Early production included relays, switchettes, and sump pump switches, followed by cold and heat controls. In 1952, the manufacture of range timers was transferred to the Morrison factory from Somersworth, New Hampshire. In ensuing year, gas igniters, thermostats, and small d.c. motors were added. In 1965, a branch plant was established at Bridgeport, CT; the department's headquarters remained at Morrison. The plant closed in 2010.

Current major employers within the community include Whiteside County government, Morrison Community School District #6, Morrison Community Hospital, Climco Coils, and Resthave Home. Because Morrison is the county seat, professional services such as attorneys, title and survey services, and financial and accounting services are well-represented. The agricultural sector remains a primary source of economic output.

== Healthcare ==
The Morrison Community Hospital offers physician coverage, ambulance service, patient transfer helipad, and a skilled care unit. Three fully staffed clinics (CGH Morrison Health & Vision Center, Morrison Family Health Clinic, and Morrison Community Hospital Family Care Clinic), dentists, optometrists, chiropractors, and physical therapists provide additional medical and health services for the community. Three fully licensed long-term care units are also available, offering physical therapy and activity programs.

== Geography ==
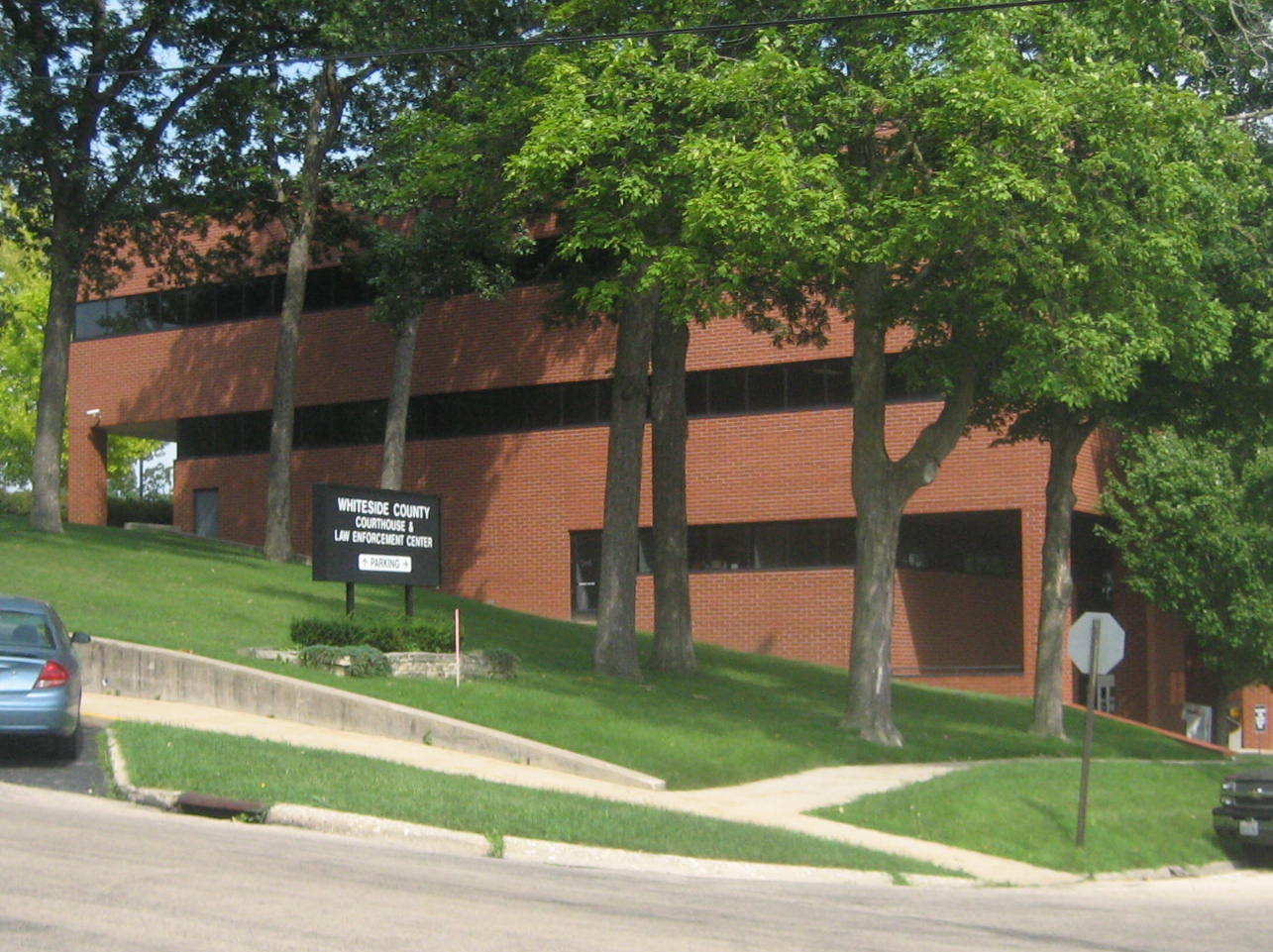
Whiteside County Courthouse

Morrison is located near the 90 degrees west line of longitude.

According to the 2010 census, Morrison has a total area of 2.46 square miles (6.37 km^{2}), all land.

=== Climate ===
Climate data for Morrison, Illinois (1991–2020 normals, extremes 1895–present)
Month	Jan	Feb	Mar	Apr	May	Jun	Jul	Aug	Sep	Oct	Nov	Dec	Year
Record high °F (°C)	65 (18)	77 (25)	86 (30)	99 (37)	105 (41)	106 (41)	112 (44)	105 (41)	103 (39)	93 (34)	80 (27)	73 (23)	112 (44)
Mean daily maximum °F (°C)	28.9 (−1.7)	33.6 (0.9)	46.2 (7.9)	59.5 (15.3)	70.8 (21.6)	79.9 (26.6)	83.1 (28.4)	81.1 (27.3)	75.0 (23.9)	62.2 (16.8)	47.2 (8.4)	34.5 (1.4)	58.5 (14.7)
Daily mean °F (°C)	20.4 (−6.4)	24.6 (−4.1)	36.4 (2.4)	48.2 (9.0)	59.8 (15.4)	69.2 (20.7)	72.5 (22.5)	70.4 (21.3)	63.1 (17.3)	50.8 (10.4)	37.8 (3.2)	26.4 (−3.1)	48.3 (9.1)
Mean daily minimum °F (°C)	12.0 (−11.1)	15.7 (−9.1)	26.7 (−2.9)	36.9 (2.7)	48.8 (9.3)	58.6 (14.8)	62.0 (16.7)	59.7 (15.4)	51.2 (10.7)	39.4 (4.1)	28.4 (−2.0)	18.3 (−7.6)	38.1 (3.4)
Record low °F (°C)	−35 (−37)	−35 (−37)	−17 (−27)	8 (−13)	23 (−5)	35 (2)	41 (5)	36 (2)	19 (−7)	9 (−13)	−7 (−22)	−28 (−33)	−35 (−37)
Average precipitation inches (mm)	1.51 (38)	1.65 (42)	2.53 (64)	3.84 (98)	4.73 (120)	4.93 (125)	4.16 (106)	4.32 (110)	3.35 (85)	2.77 (70)	2.47 (63)	2.02 (51)	38.28 (972)
Average snowfall inches (cm)	10.4 (26)	7.6 (19)	3.8 (9.7)	0.8 (2.0)	0.0 (0.0)	0.0 (0.0)	0.0 (0.0)	0.0 (0.0)	0.0 (0.0)	0.1 (0.25)	2.7 (6.9)	6.3 (16)	31.5 (80)
Average precipitation days (≥ 0.01 in)	7.6	6.1	7.3	10.3	11.1	9.7	7.3	7.9	6.9	7.2	6.8	7.5	95.7
Average snowy days (≥ 0.1 in)	4.7	3.3	1.7	0.3	0.0	0.0	0.0	0.0	0.0	0.1	1.1	3.9	15.1
Source: NOAA

== Transportation ==
Morrison is located at the intersection of U.S. Route 30 and Illinois Route 78. It is 7 miles north of Interstate 88 and 12 miles east of the Mississippi River. The Union Pacific Railroad runs through the town.

== Demographics ==
Historical population
Census	Pop.	Note	%±
1880	1,981		—
1890	2,088		5.4%
1900	2,308		10.5%
1910	2,410		4.4%
1920	3,000		24.5%
1930	3,067		2.2%
1940	3,187		3.9%
1950	3,531		10.8%
1960	4,159		17.8%
1970	4,387		5.5%
1980	4,605		5.0%
1990	4,363		−5.3%
2000	4,447		1.9%
2010	4,188		−5.8%
2020	4,085		−2.5%
U.S. Decennial Census

=== 2020 census ===
As of the 2020 census, Morrison had a population of 4,085. The median age was 45.1 years. 21.2% of residents were under the age of 18 and 25.3% of residents were 65 years of age or older. For every 100 females there were 98.7 males, and for every 100 females age 18 and over there were 98.4 males age 18 and over.

0.0% of residents lived in urban areas, while 100.0% lived in rural areas.

There were 1,662 households in Morrison, of which 26.8% had children under the age of 18 living in them. Of all households, 45.7% were married-couple households, 18.7% were households with a male householder and no spouse or partner present, and 27.7% were households with a female householder and no spouse or partner present. About 33.8% of all households were made up of individuals and 18.4% had someone living alone who was 65 years of age or older.

There were 1,877 housing units, of which 11.5% were vacant. The homeowner vacancy rate was 2.2% and the rental vacancy rate was 11.6%.

Racial composition as of the 2020 census
Race	Number	Percent
White	3,786	92.7%
Black or African American	52	1.3%
American Indian and Alaska Native	12	0.3%
Asian	17	0.4%
Native Hawaiian and Other Pacific Islander	0	0.0%
Some other race	45	1.1%
Two or more races	173	4.2%
Hispanic or Latino (of any race)	200	4.9%

=== 2010 census ===
As of the 2010 census, there were 4,188 people, 1,713 households, and 1,086 families residing in the city. The population density was 1,703 people per square mile. There were 1,870 housing units at an average density of 761 per square mile. The racial makeup of the city was 96.8% White, 0.8% African American, 0.6% Native American, 0.10% Asian, 0.7% from other races, and 1.0% from two or more races. Hispanic or Latino of any race were 2.6% of the population.

There were 1,713 households, out of which 27.7% had children under the age of 18 living with them, 48.4% were married couples living together, 10.2% had a female householder with no husband present, and 36.6% were non-families. 31.0% of all households were made up of individuals, and 16.9% had someone living alone who was 65 years of age or older. The average household size was 2.29 and the average family size was 2.84.

In the city, the population was spread out, with 25.8% 19 and under, and 21.3% who were 65 years of age or older. The median age was 41.9 years.

=== Income and poverty ===
The median income for a household in the city was $45,164, and the median income for a family was $54,394. The per capita income for the city was $24,385. About 5.0% of families and 8.5% of the population were below the poverty line, including 12.0% of those under age 18 and 7.6% of those age 65 or over. The mean travel time to work is 22.7 minutes.

== Religion ==
Morrison has numerous churches representing many denominations and the town's strong Dutch heritage. Churches within the city limits include Bethesda Lutheran Church, Crossroads Community Church, Ebenezer Reformed Church, Emmanuel Reformed Church, Episcopal Church of St. Anne, First Baptist Church, First Presbyterian Church, Morrison Brethren in Christ Church, Morrison Christian Church, Morrison Christian Reformed Church, Morrison United Methodist Church, St. Mary's Catholic Church, and St. Peter's Lutheran Church; Open Bible Fellowship and Our Savior's Lutheran Church are on the outskirts of town.

== Education ==
Morrison Community Unit School District 6 is the public school district.

The Morrison Community Unit School District operates two grade schools: one for grades K-2 and one for 3–5; a junior high school; and a high school. Morrison High School students may earn high school and college credit at the same time through the dual enrollment program. Juniors and seniors at Morrison High School may participate in career and technical education training, held at the Whiteside Area Career Center in Sterling, IL. Morrison is in close proximity to a variety of advanced educational institutions. The community is home to the Morrison Institute of Technology, which offers a two-year curriculum in engineering and drafting. Sauk Valley Community College, located on Illinois Route 2 between Dixon and Sterling, is a two-year college. Other nearby institutions of higher learning include Ashford University and Clinton Community College (Iowa) in Clinton, Iowa; Augustana College (Illinois), St. Ambrose University, and Western Illinois University-Quad Cities all located in the Quad Cities.

Christ Lutheran School serves students of various religious backgrounds from Whiteside County and is located in neighboring Sterling. As part of the largest network of Protestant schools in the US, CLS provides an education for students from age 3 through 8th grade that is focused on all of the core academic subjects while remaining true to the Bible.

=== Sports ===
Morrison High School is part of the Big Rivers Conference, a high school football-only athletic conference currently comprising ten teams (eight schools competing independently and two athletic co-operatives) in the northwest and north-central portions of Illinois. It is a member of the Illinois High School Association, while its sister conference for other sports is the Three Rivers Conference. The Big Rivers is a historically successful smaller-school football conference, having produced several state championships.

== Parks ==
There are many parks and nature areas within and near the town.

- Morrison-Rockwood State Park – The state park features Lake Carlton, a stream-fed reservoir, and offers a variety of recreational opportunities. Located north of Morrison off Highway 78, the park comprises 1,150 acres, including the 77-acre lake.
- Morrison Sports Complex – Morrison's newest park is this 35-acre sports complex, located on the east edge of town along Route 30 and the intersection of Bishop Road. The park features four fast-pitch softball/little league diamonds, one baseball diamond, and a junior tackle and football field.
- French Creek Park
- Veteran's Park & Memorial
- Kelly Park
- Kiwanis Park
- Waterworks Park

== Whiteside County Fairgrounds ==
Morrison is home to the Whiteside County Fairgrounds, which is the site of the Whiteside County Fair, agricultural show. The Whiteside County Central Agricultural Society was formed May 28, 1872 to promote all the industrial pursuits of the county, especially the agricultural, horticultural, floricultural, and mechanical interests and also the fine arts and domestic manufactures. The fairgrounds are home to the Round Barn, a century old barn—which actually has 14 sides—and is only one of a few remaining barns from the turn of the century with such a historic link to the past. It was built as an auction pavilion, housing cows and horses.

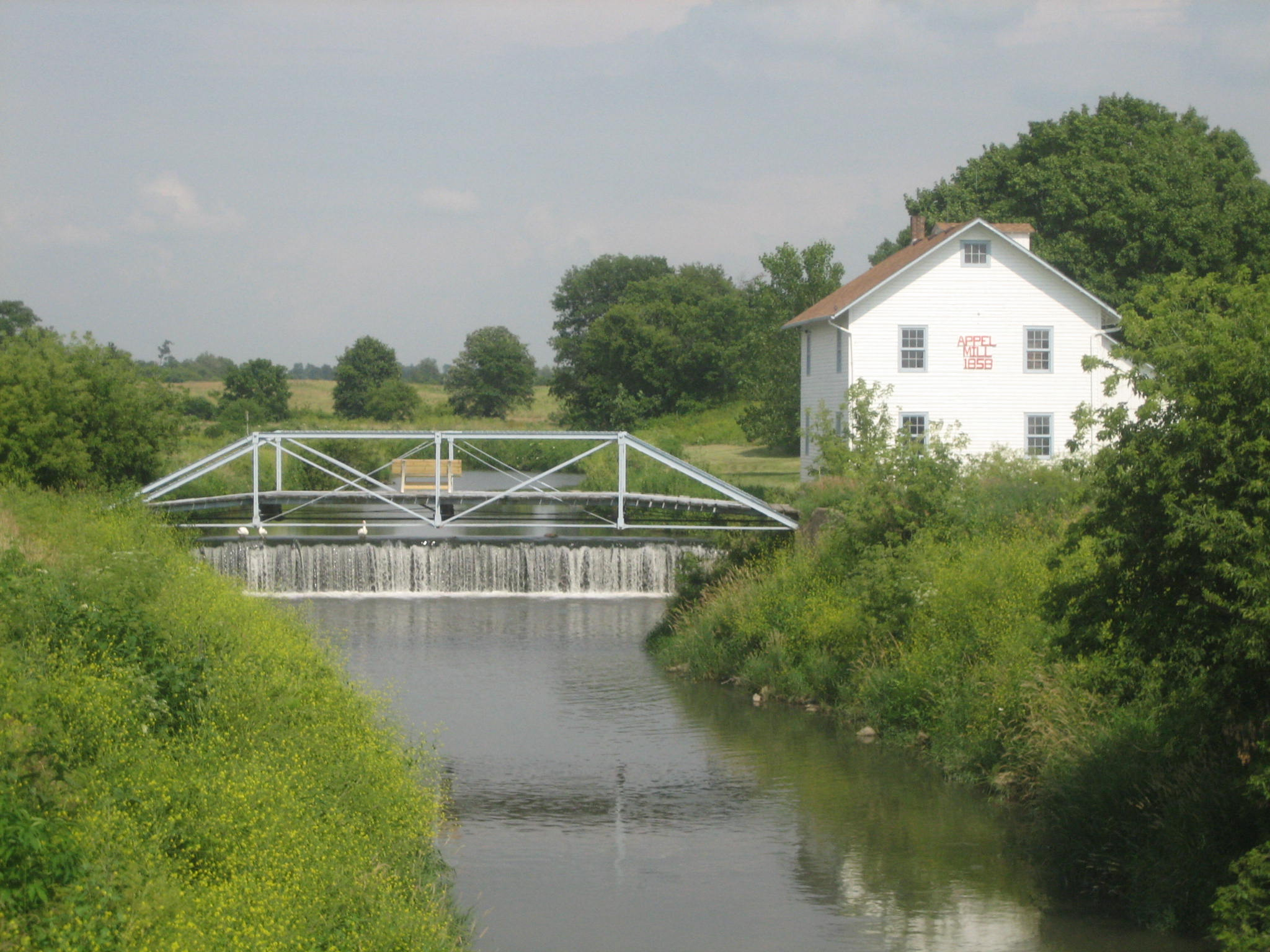
Malvern Roller Mill

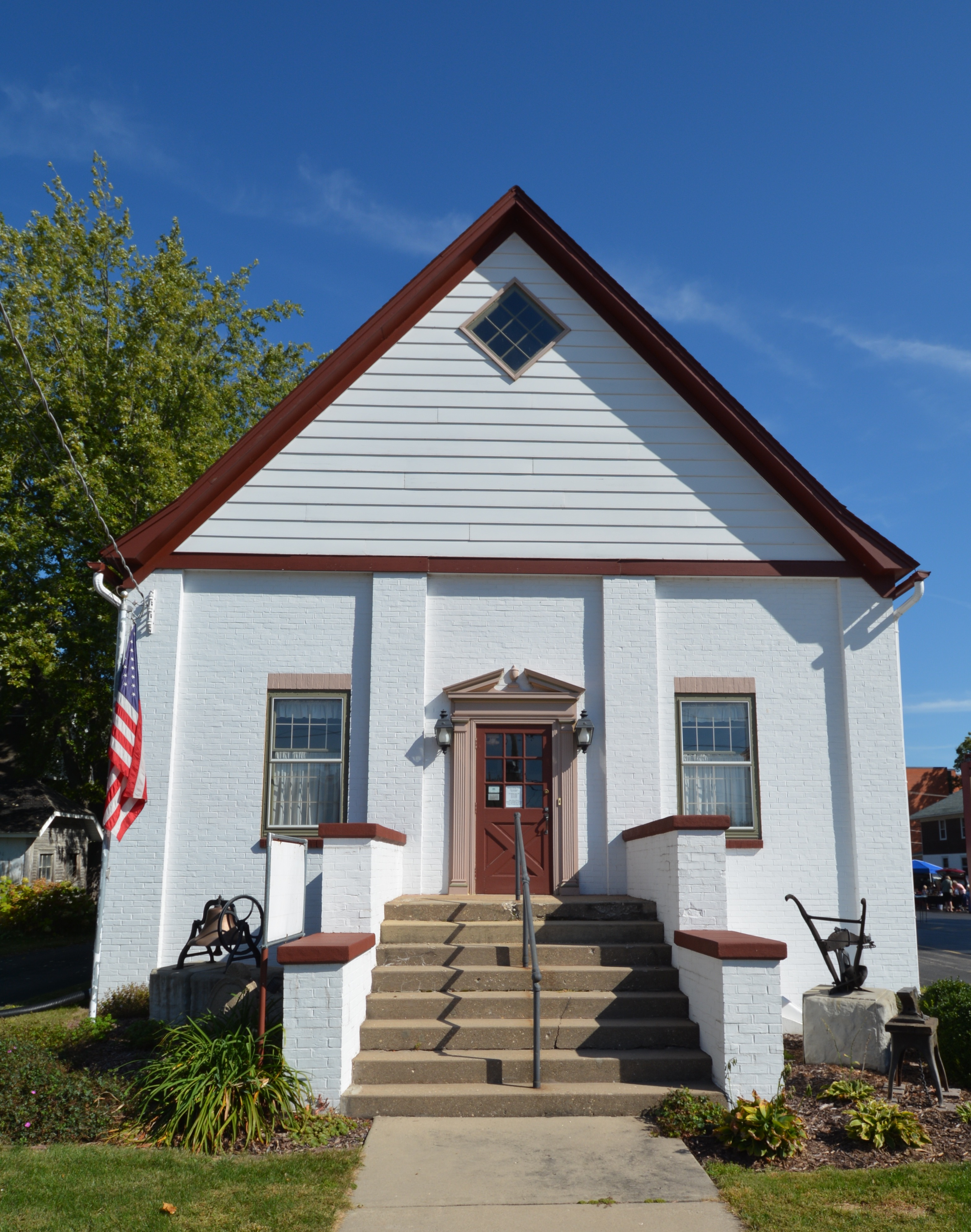
Odell Building

== Points of interest ==
- Annan Gristmill
- Covered Bridge
- Historic Downtown

=== Listed on the National Register of Historic Places ===
- Malvern Roller Mill
- Morrison's Heritage Museum
- Odell Building

== Notable people ==
- Frank R. Adams (1883–1963), songwriter, screenwriter, journalist and author
- Gertrude Foster Brown (1867–1956), suffragette, teacher and concert pianist
- Dean Cameron, (born 1962), actor, musician, comedian
- Norbert Davis, novelist
- Lafe McKee, actor
- Robert Andrews Millikan, Nobel Prize–winning physicist
- Ann Nardulli, endocrinologist and longtime University of Illinois professor
