= Torpedo Junction (disambiguation) =

Torpedo Junction may refer to:

- Torpedo Alley, also known as Torpedo Junction, the waters off the Atlantic Outer Banks in World War II
- Torpedo Junction, a World War II area of the South Pacific Ocean - see Battle of the Santa Cruz Islands
- Torpedo Junction, a 1942 military history book by Robert J. Casey
- Torpedo Junction, a 1971 novel by J. E. Macdonnell
- Torpedo Junction, a 1989 military history book by Homer Hickam
