= Leo Fisher =

Leo Fisher may refer to:

- Leo Fisher (Shameless)
- Leo Fisher (Once and Again)

== See also ==
- Leo Fischer, sportswriter
- Lee Fisher, politician
