= Chicagoland Sports Hall of Fame =

Museum in Cook County, Illinois, US

The Chicagoland Sports Hall of Fame, located in the Hawthorne Race Course, in Stickney/Cicero, near Chicago, honors sports greats associated with the Chicago metropolitan area. It was founded in 1979 as a trailer owned by the Olympia Brewing Company parked at Soldier Field in Chicago. The Chicago Park District took over the exhibits in 1983. From 1988 the exhibits were displayed in Mike Ditka's restaurant until the restaurant closed in 1991. The Hall of Fame moved to the Maryville Academy in Des Plaines in 1996 and operated under the guidance of Father John P. Smyth during that time. As of 2008, it was operating at Hawthorne.

Directors include Smyth, former Chicago Park District Superintendent Ed Kelly, DePaul University Athletic Director Jean Lenti-Ponsetto, and former Chicago Bears tight end Emery Moorehead.

The honorees include high-school athletes, such as Babe Baranowski who quarterbacked the 1937 Leo Catholic High School team in the Prep Bowl football game in Soldier Field, viewed by a record 120,000 spectators, high-school coaches, college athletes from as far away as the University of Illinois at Urbana–Champaign and the University of Notre Dame, as well as professional and Olympic athletes associated with Chicago. Their sports include everything from baseball, basketball, football, and hockey to bowling, fishing, golf, and horse racing. Two special awards, the Lifetime Achievement Award, and the Ray Meyer Coach of the Year Award may honor non-Chicagoans.

In the 2020s, the Hall of Fame began hosting its induction ceremonies at venues such as Wintrust Arena in Chicago's South Loop and the Donald E. Stephens Convention Center in Rosemont. followed by three-time Chicago Blackhawks Stanley Cup champion Duncan Keith and former Chicago Bulls forward Toni Kukoč in 2024.

== Honorees ==
Name	Sport	Position	Chicago team	Other major team
Mike Adamle	Football	Running back	Northwestern, Bears	Chiefs
Katrina Adams				
Ray Adams	Basketball		DePaul	
Paul Adams		Principal	Providence St. Mel	
Alex Agase				
Mark Aguirre	Basketball	Small forward	DePaul	Dallas Mavericks Detroit Pistons
Ted Albrecht	Football	Offensive lineman	Bears	
Muhammad Ali	Boxing			
Dick Allen	Baseball	Outfield; First Base; Third Base	White Sox	Phillies
Don Amidei	Track and Field	Coach	St. George Loyola DePaul Northwestern	
Kelly Amonte Hiller	Lacrosse	Coach		Northwestern
Nick Anderson				
Elmer Angsman	Football	Running back	Mt. Carmel HS; Notre Dame; Cardinals	
Luis Aparicio	Baseball	Shortstop	Sox	Orioles, Red Sox
Luke Appling	Baseball	Shortstop	White Sox	
Otis Armstrong	Football	Running back	Farragut HS; Purdue U.	Denver Broncos
Eddie Arroyo	Horse racing	Jockey		
Doug Atkins	Football	Defensive end	Bears	Browns, Saints
Cas Banaszek	Football	Offensive lineman	Northwestern	49ers
Ernie Banks	Baseball	Shortstop; First Base	Cubs	
Babe Baranowski	Football	Quarterback	Leo HS	
Tony Barone	Basketball	Coach	Mt. Carmel (Coach)	Memphis Grizzlies
Norman Barry	Football	Coach	Cardinals	
Glenn Beckert	Baseball	Second Base	Cubs	Padres
Taylor Bell	Writer		Daily News, Sun-Times	
Irv Bemoras	Basketball	Guard, Forward	Marshall HS; U. of Illinois	Hawks
Ben Bentley	Boxing	Promoter	Host, The Sportswriters on TV	
Tony Bertuca	Football	Linebacker	St. Patrick HS	Colts
Jay Berwanger	Football	Running back	U. of Chicago	
Tom Bettis	Football	Linebacker	Purdue University; Bears	Packers
Charles Bidwill	Football	Owner; Executive	Cardinals; Bears	
Stormy Bidwill	Football	Owner	Cardinals	
Bonnie Blair	Olympics	Speed skating	Champaign Centennial HS	
George Blanda	Football	Quarterback; Kicker	Bears	Raiders, Oilers
Lou Boudreau	Baseball; Announcer	Shortstop	Thornton HS; U. of Illinois; WGN	Cleveland Indians
Terry Brennan	Football	Running back Coach	Notre Dame	
Carl Brettschneider	Football	Linebacker	Cardinals	Lions
Jack Brickhouse	Broadcaster		Cubs, Sox, WGN	
Jim Brown	Basketball	Coach	DuSable HS	
Charlie Brown	Basketball		DuSable HS	
Avery Brundage	Olympics	Track, official	U. of Illinois	
Doug Bruno	Basketball	Coach	DePaul (W); Loyola (M); Hustle (W)	
Quinn Buckner	Basketball	Guard	Thornridge HS	Indiana U Bucks, Celtics
Doug Buffone	Football	Linebacker	Bears	
Chet Bulger	Football	Offensive line	Cardinals	Lions
Ronnie Bull	Football	Running back	Bears	Eagles
Anne M. Burke	Special Olympics	Official		
Dick Butkus	Football	Linebacker; Center	Vocational HS; U. of Illinois; Bears	
Dave Butz	Football; Basketball; Track	Offensive lineman	Maine South HS; Purdue U.	Redskins
Ricky Byrdsong	Basketball	Coach	Northwestern	Iowa State
Bob Calihan	Basketball		American Gears	U. of Detroit
Bill Campbell	Baseball	Pitcher	Cubs	Red Sox
Tony Canadeo	Football	Quarterback; Running back		Packers
Harry Caray	Baseball	Broadcaster	Cubs, Sox	Cardinals
Tom Carey	Horse racing	President	Hawthorne Race Course	
Howie Carl	Basketball	Guard	Von Steuben HS; DePaul; Chicago Packers	
John Carmichael	Writer		Chicago Daily News	
J.C. Caroline	Football	Running back Defensive back	U. of Illinois; Bears	
Rick Casares	Football	Fullback	Bears	Redskins
Phil Cavarretta	Baseball	First Base	Cubs; Sox	
Katie Schumacher-Cawley	Volleyball	Coach	UIC	Penn State
Frank Chance	Baseball	First Base; Manager	Orphans/Cubs	Yankees
Paul Christman	Football	Running back Broadcaster	Cardinals	Packers
Jim Clancy	Baseball	Pitcher	St. Rita HS	Blue Jays, Astros
Nate Clifton	Basketball; Baseball	Center, Forward; First Base	Chicago Majors; American Giants	Knicks, Globetrotters
Jerry Colangelo	Basketball; Various	Guard; Owner	Bloom HS; U. of Illinois	Diamondbacks, Suns
Grace Comiskey	Baseball	Owner	Sox	
Chuck Comiskey	Baseball	Owner	Sox	
Charles Comiskey	Baseball	Owner	Sox	
Dave Condon	Writer		Tribune	
Mike Conley, Sr.	Olympics	Track	Luther South HS	
George Connor	Football	Lineman; Linebacker	De La Salle HS; Notre Dame; Bears	
Dave Corzine	Basketball	Forward	Hersey HS; DePaul; Bulls	Bullets
Jim Covert	Football	Offensive lineman	Bears	
A.L. Whitey Cronin	Politician			
Terry Cummings	Basketball	Forward	Carver HS, DePaul	Bucks, Spurs
Rudy Custer	Football	Business Manager	Bears	
Zygmont Czarobski	Football	Lineman	Notre Dame; Chicago Rockets; Chicago Hornets	
Richard M. Daley	Politics	Mayor	City of Chicago	De La Salle HS
John Damore	Football	Offensive lineman	Northwestern; Bears	
Max Davidson	Tennis			
Andre Dawson	Baseball	Outfield	Cubs	Expos
Pat Day	Horse Racing	Jockey		
Bill DeCorrevont	Football	Running back Defensive back Quarterback	Austin HS; Northwestern; Cardinals; Bears	Lions
Jim Delany	Big Ten; Basketball	Commissioner; Guard		U. of North Carolina
Richard Dent	Football	Defensive end	Bears	
Mike Ditka	Football	Tight end Coach	Bears	Cowboys
Larry Doby	Baseball	Outfield	Sox	Indians
Billy Donovan	Basketball	Coach		U. of Florida, OKC Thunder
Bobby Douglass	Football	Quarterback	Bears	Saints, Packers
Paddy Driscoll	Football Baseball	Quarterback, Kicker; Coach Infield	Northwestern; Cardinals; Bears; Cubs	
Richard L. Duchossois	Horse Racing	Executive	Arlington Park	Churchill Downs
Dave Duerson	Football	Safety	Notre Dame; Bears	Cardinals
Jimmy Dykes	Baseball	Second Base; Third Base; Manager	Sox	Athletics
John Egan	Basketball	Guard	Loyola	
Bo Ellis	Basketball	Forward	Parker HS	Marquette, Nuggets
Bob Elson	Broadcaster		Sox	
Clyde Emrich	Olympics	Weightlifting		
James Enright	Baseball; Writer	Basketball; Referee	Chicago's American	Sporting News
Tony Esposito	Hockey	Goalie	Black Hawks	Canadiens
Nick Etten	Baseball		St. Rita HS	Phillies, Yankees
Chick Evans	Golf		Northwestern	
Johnny Evers	Baseball	Second Base	Cubs	Braves
Ed Farmer	Baseball	Pitcher	St. Rita HS; Sox	Indians
Dave Feldman	Horse Racing		Chicago's American, Daily News, Sun-Times	
Catherine Fellmeth	Bowling			
Gary Fencik	Football	Defensive back	Barrington HS; Bears	Yale
Jake Fendley	Basketball	Guard	South Shore HS; Northwestern	Pistons
Ron Ferguson	Basketball	Coach	Thornridge HS	Bradley U. AD
Sherman Finger	Golf			
Charley Finley	Baseball	Owner		Athletics
Earlie Fires	Horse Racing	Jockey		
Bill Fischer	Football	Offensive line	Notre Dame; Cardinals	
Leo Fischer	Writer		Chicago's American	
John Fitzgerald	Olympics	Modern pentathlete		
Lee Flaherty	Founder		Chicago Marathon	
Tim Foley	Football	Defensive back	Loyola Academy; Purdue U.	Dolphins
Pat Foley	Hockey	Broadcaster	Blackhawks	
Nellie Fox	Baseball	Second Base	Sox	Athletics
Clinton Frank	Football	Quarterback		Yale
Art Frantz	Baseball	Umpire		American League
Wally Fromhart	Football	Quarterback, Kicker; Coach	Notre Dame; Mt. Carmel HS	U. of Detroit
Hugh Gallarneau	Football	Running back	Bears	Stanford
Ed Galvin	Basketball	Coach	St. Rita HS; Fenwick HS	
Johnny Galvin	Football	Quarterback	Leo HS	
Dorothy Gaters	Basketball	Coach	Marshall HS	
Bill Gay	Football	Defensive back	Notre Dame; Cardinals	
Ken Geiger	Football	Scout	Bears	
Bill George	Football	Linebacker	Bears	Rams
Phil Georgeff	Horse Racing	Announcer	Bulls (Dunkin' Race Announcer)	
Abe Gibron	Football	Lineman; Coach	Bears	Browns
Gordie Gillespie	Football; Baseball	Coach	DePaul, Joliet Catholic HS, Lewis U	
Bill Gleason	Writer		Sun-Times	
Joe Gleason	Football		Leo, De La Salle, Mendel; Notre Dame	
Marshall Goldberg	Football	Running back	Cardinals	
Jim Grabowski	Football	Fullback	U. of Illinois; Bears	Packers
Otto Graham	Football Basketball	Quarterback; Coach; Guard	Northwestern	Browns; Redskins; Rochester Royals
Cammi Granato	Olympics	Women's; Ice Hockey		
Red Grange	Football	Running back	Wheaton HS; U. of Illinois; Bears	Yankees
Charlie Grimm	Baseball	First Base; Manager	Cubs	Pirates; Braves
Jerry Groom	Football	Defensive lineman	Cardinals	
Ron Guenther	Football	Offensive lineman Athletic director	U. of Illinois	
Bill Haarlow	Basketball		U. of Chicago	
Stan Hack	Baseball	Third Base; Manager	Cubs	
Don Hakes	Football	NFL Referee	Bradley U.	
George Halas	Football; Baseball	End, Owner; Outfield	Bears	Yankees
Bob Hale	Baseball			Yankees
Glenn Hall	Hockey	Goaltender	Black Hawks	Red Wings
Robert Halperin	Olympics	Yachting		
Dan Hampton	Football	Defensive end	Bears	
John Hannah	Football			Patriots
Jerry Harkness	Basketball	Guard	Loyola	Knicks; Pacers
Chic Harley	Football		Bears	Ohio State
Will Harridge	Baseball	President	American League	
John Harrington	?			
Jim Hart	Football	Quarterback		Cardinals
Bill Hartack	Horse Racing	Jockey		
Gabby Hartnett	Baseball	Catcher; Manager	Cubs	Giants
Ellie Hassin	?			
Tommy Hawkins	Basketball	Forward	Parker HS; Notre Dame	Lakers
Michael Hechinger	?			
Ted Hendricks	Football			Raiders
Ken Henry	Olympics	Speed Skating	Taft HS, NIU	
Billy Herman	Baseball	Second Base; Manager	Cubs	Dodgers; Red Sox
Tom Hicks	Football	Linebacker	Willowbrook HS; U. of Illinois; Bears	
Jay Hilgenberg	Football	Center	Bears	Browns
Ralph Hinger	Basketball	Coach	Notre Dame HS	
Chris Hinton	Football	Offensive lineman	Northwestern	Colts
Charlie Hoag	Basketball	?		
John Hoerster	Football	Coach	Loyola HS	
Joan Holm	Bowling; Speedskating; Bicycling			
Jerome Holtzman	Writer		Daily News, Sun-Times, Tribune	
Ken Holtzman	Baseball	Pitcher	Cubs	Athletics
Dianne Holum	Olympics	Speed skating		
Willie Hoppe	Billiards			
Jeff Hornacek	Basketball	Guard	Lyons Township HS	Suns, Jazz
Bobby Hull	Hockey	Left wing	Black Hawks	Jets
Dennis Hull	Hockey	Left wing	Black Hawks	Red Wings
Randy Hundley	Baseball	Catcher	Cubs	Giants
George Ireland	Basketball	? Coach	Notre Dame; Loyola	
Tommy Ivan	Hockey	Coach, GM	Black Hawks	Red Wings
Bill Jauss	Writer		Tribune	
Joe Jemsek	Golf			
Ferguson Jenkins	Baseball	Pitcher	Cubs	Rangers
Luke Johnsos	Football	End; Coach	Schurz HS; Northwestern; Bears	
John Jordan	Basketball	Coach	Mount Carmel HS; Loyola; Notre Dame	
Jack Kaiser	Baseball	Coach	Oak Park HS	
Yosh Kawano	Baseball	Clubhouse manager	Cubs	
Jim Keane	Football	Receiver	Bears	Packers
Bob Kelly	Baseball	Cubs		
Ed Kelly	Chicago Park District	Superintendent		Oshkosh All-Stars
Mike Kenn	Football	Offensive lineman	Evanston Township High School	Falcons
Bob Kennedy	Baseball	3B/OF; Manager	Sox; Cubs	Indians
Johnny Kerr	Basketball	Center Coach	Tilden Tech; U. of Illinois; Bulls	Suns
Don Kessinger	Baseball	Shortstop	Cubs	Cardinals
Adolph Kiefer	Olympics	Swimming		
John Kinsella	Olympics	Swimming	Hinsdale Central HS	
Nick Kladis	Basketball; Baseball	Owner/Exec	Tilden Tech; Loyola; Sox	Cardinals
John Klippstein	Baseball	Pitcher	Cubs	Reds
Jerry Korab	Hockey	Defenseman	Black Hawks	
Gary Korhonen	Football	Coach	Richards High School	
Cliff Koroll	Hockey	Defenseman	Black Hawks	
Ken Kraft	Wrestling	Coach	Northwestern	
Ed Krause	Basketball; Football	Center; Athletic director	Notre Dame	
Jerry Krause	Basketball	Executive	Bulls	Bullets
Joe Krupa	Football	Defensive end	Purdue U.	Steelers
Mike Krzyzewski	Basketball	Coach	Weber HS	Duke
Eric Kumerow	Football	Linebacker	Bears; Oak Park-River Forest HS	Dolphins
Irv Kupcinet	Writer		Sun-Times	
Steve Larmer	Hockey	Right wing	Black Hawks	Rangers
Kenesaw Mountain Landis	Baseball	Commissioner		
Frank LaPorte	Baseball	Second Base		
Johnny Lattner	Football	Running back	Notre Dame; Fenwick HS	Steelers
Tony Lawless	Football; Basketball	Fullback; Coach	Loyola; Fenwick HS	
Elmer Layden	Football	Running back Coach; Athletic director	Notre Dame	NFL Commissioner
Murney Lazier	Football	Coach	Evanston HS	
Frank Leahy	Football	Coach	Notre Dame	
Frank Lenti	Football	Coach	Mt. Carmel HS	
Jean Lenti-Ponsetto	4 sports	Athletic director	DePaul U.	
Jim Les	Basketball	Guard; Coach	Bradley	Kings
Marv Levy	Football	Coach	South Shore HS	Bills
Dennis Lick	Football	Offensive lineman	St. Rita HS; Bears	
Arlene Limas	Olympics	Taekwondo		
Benjamin Lindheimer	Horse racing Football			LA Dons
Fred Lindstrom	Baseball	Third Base; Outfield	Cubs; Loyola Academy	Giants
Sherm Lollar	Baseball	Catcher	Sox	Browns
Al Lopez	Baseball	Catcher; Manager	Sox	Dodgers; Indians
George Lott	Tennis	Player; Coach	DePaul	
George Loukas	Football	Fullback		
Bob Love	Basketball	Forward	Bulls	
Sid Luckman	Football	Quarterback	Bears	
Jerry Lyne	Basketball	Coach	Loyola	
Ted Lyons	Baseball	Pitcher; Manager	Sox	
Keith Magnuson	Hockey	Defenseman	Black Hawks	
Ralph Malliard	Football; Track	Coach	St. Ignatius	
Frank Maloney	Football	Coach; Executive	Cubs	Syracuse U.
Pete Mannos	Soccer		NIU	
Mush March	Hockey	Right wing	Black Hawks	
Bill Marek	Football		St. Rita HS	
Jerry Markbreit	Football	Referee		
Ollie Matson	Football	Running back	Cardinals	
George McAfee	Football	Running back	Bears	Duke U.
Don McAuliffe	Football			Michigan St.
Terry McCann	Olympics	Wrestling		U. of Iowa
Larry McCarren	Football	Center	Rich East HS, U. of Illinois	Packers
Ignatius McDermott	Baseball	Fan	Sox	
John McDonough	Hockey	Executive	Blackhawks	
Frank McGrath	Basketball	Coach	Weber	
Jack McHugh	Football	Cornerback	St. Rita HS	
William McKinnis	?			
Jim McMahon	Football	Quarterback	Bears	
Steve McMichael	Football	Defensive lineman	Bears	
Randy Meier	Horse racing	Jockey		
Gene Melchiorre	Basketball		Bradley U.	
Bill Melton	Baseball	Third Base	Sox	
Ralph Metcalfe	Olympics	Track		
Joey Meyer	Basketball	Coach	DePaul	
Ray Meyer	Basketball	Coach	DePaul	
Stan Mikita	Hockey	Center	Black Hawks	
Marlene Miller	Golf	Coach	Lake Forest HS	
Minnie Minoso	Baseball	Outfield	Sox	Indians
Tom Monforti			DePaul	
Emery Moorehead	Football	Tight end	Bears	
Johnny Morris	Football	Running back	Bears	
Red Mottlow	Sportcaster		WCFL	
Bronko Nagurski	Football	Running back	Bears	
Ernie Neal	?			
Eric Nesterenko	Hockey	Center	Black Hawks	
Joe Newton	Cross country	Coach	York HS	
Bill Nicholson	Baseball	Outfield	Cubs	Phillies
Ray Nitschke	Football	Linebacker	Proviso HS, U. of Illinois	Packers
Jim Norris	Hockey; Boxing	Executive	Black Hawks	
Mike North	Sportscaster			
Ed O'Bradovich	Football	Defensive end	Proviso East HS; U. of Illinois; Bears	
Bernie O'Brien	Football	Coach	Vocational HS	
Dan O'Brien				
Tommy O'Connell	Football		Bears	Browns
Bill Ogden	Golf			
Tom O'Hara	Olympics	Miler	Loyola	
Fred O'Keefe	Football	Coach	Schurz HS	
Bill O'Rourke	?			
Bill Osmanski	Football	Running back	Bears	Holy Cross
Jim O'Toole	Baseball	Pitcher	Reds	
Andy Pafko	Baseball	Outfield	Cubs	Dodgers, Braves
Chuck Palmer	Football	Coach	Fenger HS	
Ken Panfil	Football	Tackle	Purdue U. Cardinals	Rams
Frank Parker	Tennis			
Ara Parseghian	Football	Coach	Notre Dame, Northwestern	
Tony Pasquesi	Football		St. Philip; Notre Dame; Cardinals	
John Paxson	Basketball	Guard; GM	Notre Dame; Bulls	Spurs
Walter Payton	Football	Running back	Bears	
Nancy Wichgers Pedersen		Athletic director	Mother McAuley HS	
Harry Pezzullo	Golf			
Robert J. Pickens	Olympics	Wrestling		U. of Wisconsin
Billy Pierce	Baseball	Pitcher	Sox	Tigers, Giants
Pete Pihos	Football	End		Eagles
Gene Pingatore	Basketball	Coach	St. Josephs	
Fritz Pollard	Football	Running back Coach	Lane Tech HS	Akron Pros
Ken Popejoy	Track	Miler		Michigan State U.
Erv Prasse	Basketball			
Mike Prior	Football	Defensive back	Marian Catholic High School; Illinois State	Packers, Colts
Kirby Puckett	Baseball	Outfield	Bradley U. Triton College	Twins
Bob Pulford	Hockey	Wing; Coach/GM	Black Hawks	Maple Leafs; Kings
Mike Pyle	Football	Lineman	Bears	
Jack Quinlan	Sportscaster		WGN, WIND	
Tom Quinn	Football	Referee	Big Ten	
Bobby Rahal	Auto Racing			
Billy Reay	Hockey	Coach	Black Hawks	
Jerry Reinsdorf	Baseball; Basketball	Owner	Sox; Bulls	
John Rice	Baseball	Umpire	American League	
John Rigney	Baseball	Pitcher; General Manager	Sox	
Jim Rivera	Baseball	Outfield	Sox	Browns, Athletics
Doc Rivers	Basketball	Guard, Coach	Marquette University; Proviso East HS	Celtics, Hawks
Elizabeth Robinson Schwartz	Olympics	Track	Thornton HS	
Knute Rockne	Football	Coach	Notre Dame	
Annette Rogers Kelly	Olympics	Track	Northwestern	
Nat Rosasco	Golf			
Barney Ross	Boxer			
Mickey Rottner	Basketball	Guard	Loyola; Stags	
Willie Roy	Soccer	Coach	Sting	
Cazzie Russell	Basketball	Guard, Forward	Carver HS	U of Michigan, Knicks
Ed Ryan	Football	?		
Lou Rymkus	Football	Lineman	Tilden Tech; Notre Dame	Browns
Lou Saban	Football	Coach	Northwestern; Western Illinois	Bills, Broncos
Lennie Sachs	Football; Basketball	Coach	Shurz HS; Cardinals; DePaul; Loyola	
Carmen Salvino	Bowling			
Dale Samuels	Football	Quarterback	Purdue U.	
Ryne Sandberg	Baseball	Second Base; Third Base	Cubs	
Scott Sanderson	Baseball	Pitcher	Cubs; Sox	Expos, Yankees
Ron Santo	Baseball	Third Base	Cubs; Sox	
Abe Saperstein	Basketball	Coach	Globetrotters	
Hank Sauer	Baseball	Outfield	Cubs	Reds, Cardinals, Giants
Denis Savard	Hockey	Center, Coach	Blackhawks	Canadiens, Lightning
Gale Sayers	Football	Running back	Bears	Univ. of Kansas
Vic Schwall	Football		Northwestern; Cardinals	
Barbara Ann Scott King	Olympics	Figure Skating		
Bill Self	Basketball	Coach	U. of Illinois	U. of Kansas
Jim Seymour	Football	Wide receiver	Notre Dame; Bears; Fire	
Al Secord	Hockey	Left wing	Black Hawks	
Dan Shannon	Football	Linebacker; Tight end	Notre Dame	
Bob Shaw	Baseball	Pitcher	Sox; Cubs	Giants
Bill Shay	Basketball; Boxing	Coach	St. Philip HS; Park District	
Michael Sheahan	Football		Mendel Catholic	
Mark Simanton	Soccer	Midfielder	New Trier HS; Sting	
Mike Simanton	?			
Tony Skoronski	Horse racing	Jockey		
Bill Skowron	Baseball	First Base	Weber HS, Sox	Yankees
Wilfrid Smith	Football		Cardinals	
John Smyth	Basketball		Notre Dame	
Ron Sobie	Basketball	Forward	DePaul	Knicks
Ed Sprinkle	Football	Offensive lineman	Bears	
Amos Alonzo Stagg	Football	Coach	U. of Chicago	
Dick Stanfel	Football	Coach	Bears	
Ruck Steger	Football		U. of Illinois	
Lee Stern	Soccer	Owner	Sting	
Darryl Stingley	Football	Running back Wide receiver	Marshall HS; Purdue U.	Patriots
Tim Stoddard	Basketball; Baseball	Forward; Pitcher	Sox; Cubs	NC State; Orioles
Don Stonesifer	Football	Wide receiver	Northwestern; Cardinals	
Gene Sullivan	Basketball	Coach	Loyola	
Thomas Sullivan	Track		St. George High School	
Pat Summerall	Football	Kicker; Sportscaster	Cardinals	Giants; CBS, FOX
Stan Szukala	Basketball		Bruins	
Dale Tallon	Hockey	Defenseman; General Manager	Black Hawks	Canucks
Helmut Teichner	Skiing			
Ernie Terrell	Boxing	Heavyweight	Promoter	
Tom Thayer	Football	Offensive lineman	Bears; Notre Dame; Joliet Catholic HS	
Mel Thillens	Baseball	Owner	Thillens Stadium	
Jack Tierney	Basketball	Forward	Loyola Ramblers; Chicago Bruins	
Joe Tinker	Baseball	Shortstop	Cubs	
Mike Tomczak	Football	Quarterback	TF North HS, Bears	
Mario Tonelli	Football	Notre Dame; Cardinals		
David Trager	Basketball	Owner	Packers	
Charley Trippi	Football	Running back	Cardinals	
Dick Triptow	Basketball	Guard, Forward	Lane Tech HS; DePaul University; American Gears	
Clyde Turner	Football	Center; Linebacker	Bears	
Danielle Tyler	Olympics	Softball		
Charlie Ulrich	Football	Tackle	U. of Illinois; Cardinals	
Jerry Vainisi	Football	General Manager	Bears	Lions
Norm Van Lier	Basketball	Guard	Bulls	Royals
Keith Van Horne	Football	Offensive lineman	Bears	
Blair Varnes	Basketball	Coach	St.Pats HS	
Bill Veeck Jr.	Baseball; Horse racing	Owner, Executive	Sox	Browns
William Veeck, Sr.	Baseball	Executive	Cubs	
Ken Venturi	Golf			
Bob Voigts	Football	Tackle; Coach	Northwestern	
Mike Wagner	Football	Defensive back	Western Illinois U.	Steelers
Chet Walker	Basketball	Forward	Bradley U. Bulls	76ers
Lloyd Walton	Basketball	Guard	Mount Carmel HS	Marquette, Bucks
Arch Ward	Writer		Tribune	
Pete Ward	Baseball	Third Base	Sox	Orioles, Yankees
Marilee Stepan Wehman	Olympics	Swimming		
Rich Weiler	Basketball	Referee		
Marty Wendell	Football	Offensive lineman	Notre Dame	
Johnny Weissmuller	Olympics	Swimming		
Richard C. Wessell Sr.	Publisher			
Jesse White	Basketball; Tumbling	Coach	Waller HS; JW Tumbling	
Willye White	Olympics	Track		
Billy Williams	Baseball	Outfield	Cubs	Athletics
Bert Wilson	Broadcaster		WGN, Cubs	
Doug Wilson	Hockey	Defenseman	Black Hawks	Sharks
George Wilson	Basketball	Center	Marshall High School; Bulls	1964 Olympics, Royals, SuperSonics, Suns, 76ers, Braves
Hack Wilson	Baseball	Outfield	Cubs	
Arthur Wirtz	Hockey; Basketball	Owner	Black Hawks; Bulls	Red Wings
William W. Wirtz	Hockey	Owner	Black Hawks	
Joe Witry	Baseball; Basketball; Football		Loyola	
Wilbur Wood	Baseball	Pitcher	Sox	Braves
Frank Wright	?			
Philip K. Wrigley	Baseball	Owner	Cubs	
Early Wynn	Baseball	Pitcher	Sox	Indians, Senators
Buddy Young	Football	Running back	U. of Illinois	Colts
Tony Zale	Boxing			
Rich Zaleski	Fishing			
Chris Zorich	Football	Linebacker; Defensive line	Vocational HS; Notre Dame; Bears	

== See also ==
- Chicago Cubs award winners and league leaders § Chicagoland Sports Hall of Fame
