= George Wheeler Hinman =

American writer and publisher (1864–1927)

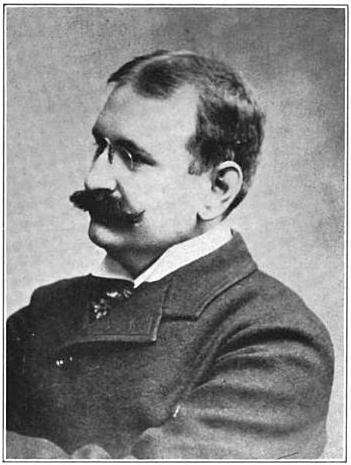
- Born: November 19, 1864; Mount Morris, New York
- Died: March 31, 1927 (aged 62); Winnetka, Illinois
- Occupation: Newspaper editor
- Spouse: Maude M. Sturtevant (m. 1891)

George Wheeler Hinman (November 19, 1864 - March 31, 1927) was an American writer and newspaper publisher. He also served as the president of Marietta College in Ohio from 1913 to 1918.

== Biography ==
Hinman was born in Mount Morris, New York in 1864, and graduated from Hamilton College in New York in 1884. After working at newspapers in Chicago and St. Louis, he obtained a master's degree and Ph.D. degree from Heidelberg University in 1889. He then joined The Sun in New York, where he remained on the staff for about ten years. Around 1898 he took a position as editor and manager of the Chicago Inter Ocean, and bought a controlling share in the paper in 1906. He sold the paper to H. H. Kohlsaat in 1912.

From 1913 to 1918, he was President of Marietta College in Ohio, where he started a new literary magazine, The Olio. He later became publisher of the Chicago Herald and Examiner.

== Personal ==
Hinman married Maude M. Sturtevant on January 28, 1891, and had five children.

He died at his home in Winnetka, Illinois on March 31, 1927.
