= Minnesota Softball =

Sports governing body in Minnesota, United States

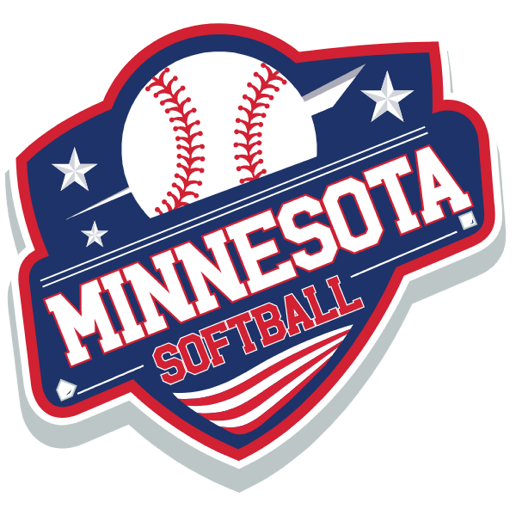
- Minnesota Softball
- Sport: Softball
- Founded: 1925
- Founder: Harold A. Johnson
- First season: 1925
- Commissioner: Dan Pfeffer
- Country: United States
- Headquarters: Medina, MN
- Website: https://www.mnsoftball.com/

Minnesota Softball is the statewide governing body of amateur softball in Minnesota and an affiliate of USA Softball. As the governing body of softball in Minnesota, it is its responsibility to regulate competition to ensure fairness and equal opportunity to the people who play the sport.

Since 1925, Minnesota Softball (formerly known as Minnesota State Diamond Ball Association and Minnesota Amateur Softball Association) has been providing volunteer services for the development and promotion of youth and adult softball in Minnesota.

In 1935, Minnesota officially joined the Amateur Softball Association (ASA), and Mr. Earnest W. Johnson the Superintendent of Playgrounds for the City of St. Paul was named State Commissioner. ASA has since rebranded to USA Softball on January 1, 2017, and is the national governing body of softball in the United States.

Minnesota Softball is governed by a board of directors and consists of approximately 176 community based youth associations, 16 club youth associations, and 60 adult leagues who are formed into 8 districts.

Minnesota Softball is one of 62 local state and metro associations.

== History ==
In 1918, William Ahern organized a City Amateur Kitten Ball association modelled on lines similar to those of the Minneapolis Amateur Baseball Association. The association was designed to include all kitten ball organizations of the city and will be composed of one representative from each league. William Ahern, who has played a prominent part in the organization of kitten ball teams both in Minneapolis and St. Paul, was elected president of the newly formed association. C.J. Hermstad was chosen vice president, with Bert Ekberg secretary-treasurer. A committee was also appointed to draw up a constitution and by-laws for the association, which will be passed upon at another meeting. The division of the leagues, size of bat and ball, and other details will be included in the articles, which will apply to all leagues. J.C. Batten and J. Poitras, make up this committee.

In 1920, new officers were elected for the season. Nick Kahler is president; William Ahern, vice president; Tom Hastings, secretary; Harold A. Johnson, treasurer.

In 1923, William Ahern was elected president of the Minneapolis Diamondball Association at the annual meeting of the organization last week. It marks the third year of service in that capacity.

In 1924, William Ahern was named Diamondball President. The Minneapolis Diamondball Association meeting was held and officers for the coming year were named. William Ahern has been elected president; C.A. Neavles, first vice president; Walter McDonald, second vice president; Conrad Thorpe, secretary; H.A. Johnson, treasurer.

In 1925, Harold A. Johnson was named Minnesota State Diamond Ball Commissioner. The Twin Cities Championship was not played this year as both city champions entered a statewide Diamondball Championship Tournament. Cook's of Duluth beat Hibbing 5 to 4 to win the Iron Range district. Then Bertch Furniture of Minneapolis beat Cook's 7-0. Greb Martonick had 17 strikeouts to win Northern States. Winona beat Faribault, then St. Francis Casinos of St. Paul beat Winona on Marty O'Connors no hitter to win Southern States. Bertch Furniture would win the championship series held between Parade and Dunning for the 1925 State Championship.

In 1926, the state diamondball championship was decided by tournament play again this year, according to announcement made today by H.A. Johnson of the park board and president of the state diamondball association. The tournament was held last year for the first time and it provided to be very successful and the state officials decided to hold the tourney again this year.

== Organization ==
=== Commissioner ===
The Commissioner is the principal liaison between the local Minnesota association and the USA Softball National Office in Oklahoma City. It was not until 1952 when Minnesota joined ASA.

- 1925-1934 Harold A. Johnson (Minneapolis)
- 1935-1946 Earnest W. Johnson (St. Paul)
- 1947-1951 Einar Nelson (Coon Rapids)
- 1952-1953 Burton K. Storm (Richfield)
- 1954-1960 Laurenz "Larry" Harris (Hopkins)
- 1959-1966 Ron Hurst (Bloomington)
- 1967-1975 Bob Kojetin (Edina)
- 1976 Lavern Schumack (Minneapolis)
- 1977-2010 Perry Coonce (South St. Paul)
- 2011–Present Dan Pfeffer (Maple Grove)

=== Districts ===
Minnesota is divided up into eight different districts.

- District 1 consists of the following counties: Dodge, Fillmore, Freeborn, Goodhue, Houston, Mower, Olmstead, Rice, Steele, Wabasha, Winona.
- District 2 consists of the following counties: Blue Earth, Brown, Cottonwood, Faribault, Jackson, Le Sueur, Lincoln, Lyon, Martin, Murray, Nicollet, Nobles, Pipestone, Redwood, Rock, Waseca, Watonwan.
- District 3 consists of the following counties: Anoka, Dakota, Ramsey, Washington.
- District 4 consists of the following counties: Hennepin. Minneapolis is its own USA Softball recognized metro association and is operated by Minneapolis Park and Recreation.
- District 5 consists of the following counties: Carver, Scott, Wright.
- District 6 consists of the following counties: Benton, Big Stone, Chippewa, Kandiyohi, Lac qui Parle, McLeod, Meeker, Mille Lacs, Morrison, Pope, Renville, Sherburne, Sibley, Stearns, Stevens, Swift, Todd, Traverse, Yellow Medicine.
- District 7 consists of the following counties: Aitkin, Carlton, Chisago, Cook, Crow Wing, Isanti, Itasca, Kanabec, Koochiching, Lake, Pine, St. Louis.
- District 8 consists of the following counties: Becker, Beltrami, Cass, Clay, Clearwater, Douglas, Grant, Hubbard, Kittson, Lake of the Woods, Mahnomen, Marshall, Norman, Otter Tail, Pennington, Polk, Red Lake, Roseau, Wadena, Wilkin.

== Championships ==
=== National championship teams from Minnesota ===
Year	Team	Community	National Tournament
1974	Sears Roebuck	Bloomington	ASA Men's Industrial A Slow Pitch
1976	Rustic Bar	Duluth	ASA Women's A Slow Pitch
1982	Triangle Sports	Minneapolis	ASA Men's Major Slow Pitch
1983	Spooks	Anoka	ASA Women's Major Slow Pitch
1983	Big C's	Hutchinson	ASA Men's A Modified Pitch
1984	Cargill Gold	Mound	ASA Women's Industrial Slow Pitch
1984	Spooks	Anoka	ASA Women's Major Slow Pitch
1985	Triangle Enterprises	Delano	ASA Men's A Modified Pitch
1986	Park Avenue Covenant	Bloomington	ASA Church Slow Pitch
1986	Rookies	Ruthton	ASA Boys' 18-Under Fast Pitch
1987	Minnesota Merchants	Minneapolis	ASA Men's Class A Slow Pitch
1988	Spooks	Anoka	ASA Women's Major Slow Pitch
1988	Stewart Taylor	Duluth	ASA Men's A Fast Pitch
1989	Rookies	Ruthton	ASA Men's 19-Under Fast Pitch
1990	Rookies	Ruthton	ASA Men's 19-Under Fast Pitch
1994	Leroy	Leroy	ASA Boys' 16-Under Fast Pitch
1994	Kegal Signs	Barnesville	ASA Boys' 12-Under Fast Pitch
1995	Happy Chef	Mankato	ASA Men's A Fast Pitch
1995	Long Haul Trucking	Albertville	ASA Women's D Slow Pitch
1996	Junkers	Mankato	ASA Men's 23-Under Fast Pitch
1996	Red Man Construction	Leroy	ASA Boys' 18-Under Fast Pitch
1996	Spooks	Anoka	ASA Women's Major Slow Pitch
1997	Long Haul/TPS	Albertville	ASA Men's Major Slow Pitch
1997	Coffee Cup/DeMarini	St. Paul	ASA Men's A Slow Pitch
1997	Super Sounds Tapes	St. James	ASA Men's Over-45 Fast Pitch
1998	Minnesota Merchants	Minneapolis	ASA Men's 35-Over Slow Pitch
1998	Hooters/TPS/Cro Hall	South St. Paul	ASA Co-Ed A Slow Pitch
1998	G&M Contracting	Lake Crystal	ASA Boys' 18-Under Fast Pitch
1999	Super Sounds Tapes	St. James	ASA Men's 50-Over Fast Pitch
1999	Macken Plumbing/Budweiser	Rochester	ASA Women's A Slow Pitch
1999	Minnesota Merchants	Minneapolis	ASA Men's 35-Over Slow Pitch
2000	Long Haul/TPS	Albertville	ASA Men's Major Slow Pitch
2000	Super Sounds Tapes	St. James	ASA Men's 50-Over Fast Pitch
2000	Thurs Roofing	Brooklyn Center	ASA Men's 35-Over Slow Pitch
2001	Long Haul/Taylor Bros/Shen Corp/TPS	Albertville	ASA Men's Super Slow Pitch
2002	Long Haul/Taylor Bros/Shen Corp	Albertville	ASA Men's Super Slow Pitch
2002	Jonny's Saloon	Rochester	ASA Co-Ed Major Slow Pitch
2002	Head First Softball	Coon Rapids	ASA 16-Under Boys' Slow Pitch
2003	Odin	Odin	ASA Men's 23-Under Fast Pitch
2003	GM Contracting	Lake Crystal	ASA Boys' 18-Under Fast Pitch
2003	Golf Warehouse	Elk River	ASA Men's 45-Over Slow Pitch
2003	Minnesota Merchants/Easton	Minneapolis	ASA Men's 35-Over Slow Pitch
2003	Stewie Fast Pitch	Stewartville	ASA Boys' 16-Under Fast Pitch
2004	Minnesota Mudhens	Minnetonka	ASA Women's 23-Under Fast Pitch
2004	LeMay's	Lake Crystal	ASA Men's 23-Under Fast Pitch
2004	Maple River Eagles	Mapleton	ASA Boys' 14-Under Fast Pitch
2004	Minnesota Mudhens	Minnetonka	ASA Women's A Fast Pitch
2005	Long Haul Trucking/Miken	Albertville	ASA Men's A Slow Pitch
2005	LeMay's	Lake Crystal	ASA Men's 23-Under Fast Pitch
2005	Maple River Eagles	Mapleton	ASA Boys' 16-Under Fast Pitch
2005	St. Paul Midway	St. Paul	ASA Boys' 12-Under Fast Pitch
2006	Maple River Eagles	Mapleton	ASA Boys' 18-Under Fast Pitch
2006	Minnesota Mudhens	Minnetonka	ASA Women's A Fast Pitch
2007	Long Haul Trucking/Miken	Albertville	ASA Men's A Slow Pitch
2007	Weggy's	Lake Crystal	ASA Men's 23-Under Fast Pitch
2007	St. Paul Midway	St. Paul	ASA Boys' 14-Under Fast Pitch
2009	Long Haul Trucking	Albertville	ASA Men's A Slow Pitch
2009	Next Generation/Just1More	Owatonna	ASA Men's D Slow Pitch Northern
2010	Minnesota Merchants	Minneapolis	ASA Men's 45-Over Slow Pitch
2010	Long Haul Trucking	Albertville	ASA Men's A Slow Pitch
2010	The Saloon	Minnetrista	ASA Women's D Slow Pitch Northern
2011	Hennager Plumbing & Heating	Lake Crystal	ASA Boys' 18-Under Fast Pitch
2011	Minnesota Merchants	Minneapolis	ASA Men's 45-Over Slow Pitch
2011	Steichen Real Estate	Austin	ASA Men's E Slow Pitch Northern
2012	Xtreme/Combat	Brooklyn Center	ASA Men's B Slow Pitch
2013	Long Haul/JJ's/Doerflinger/Easton	Albertville	ASA Men's A Slow Pitch
2013	Cheap, Fast, & Easy T's	Bloomington	ASA Women's D Slow Pitch Northern
2014	Devils	Blaine	ASA Women's C Slow Pitch
2015	O&S Cattle/Mr. D's	Eagan	ASA Men's Super Slow Pitch
2016	O&S Cattle/Mr. D's	Eagan	ASA Men's Super Slow Pitch
2016	Dewey's	Montevideo	ASA Men's E Slow Pitch Northern
2018	Mankato Peppers Elite	Mankato	ASA Girls 14-Under A Fast Pitch
2019	All American Restoration	Champlin	USA Softball Men's B Slow Pitch
2019	Bloomington Jazz	Bloomington	USA Softball 18-Under Girls' Slow Pitch
2019	Arnie's Sewer & Septic	New Ulm	USA Softball Men's E Slow Pitch Northern
2020	Kegel Black Knights	Amboy	USA Softball Men's Major Fast Pitch
2020	SE Flyers	Eyota	USA Softball 18-Under A Girls' Fast Pitch
2021	Stagecoach/Crest Exteriors	Shakopee	USA Softball Men's C Slow Pitch
2021	Nasty Boys/Monsta/Greater Than	Hayfield	USA Softball Men's D Slow Pitch Northern
2022	Stagecoach	Shakopee	USA Softball Men's C Slow Pitch
2022	Burnsville Heat	Burnsville	USA Softball Girls 14-Under Slow Pitch
2022	Burnsville Firecrackers	Burnsville	USA Softball Girls 18-Under Slow Pitch
2023	Team Stoop/Schmidt Roofting	Sartell	USA Softball Men's B Slow Pitch
2024	Jac's Bar & Grill	Rochester	USA Softball Men's E/Rec Slow Pitch

== Notable players ==
=== Minnesotans named to national teams ===
Year	Player	Community	National Team
1972	John Muench	Prior Lake	Team USA Men's Fast Pitch
1989	Todd Bouman	Ruthton	Team USA Junior Men's Fast Pitch
1993	Jenny Condon	Edina	Team USA Women's Fast Pitch
1994	Jenny Condon	Edina	Team USA Women's Fast Pitch
1997	Judd Berthiaume	Roseville	Team USA Men's Fast Pitch
2001	Tom Roth	Lake Crystal	Team USA Junior Men's Fast Pitch
2001	Dan Berthiaume	St. Paul	Team USA Junior Men's Fast Pitch
2001	Dave Berthiaume	St. Paul	Team USA Junior Men's Fast Pitch
2003	Chad Boom	Barnesville	Team USA Men's Fast Pitch
2004	Chad Boom	Barnesville	Team USA Men's Fast Pitch
2005	Bobby Olson	Amboy	Team USA Junior Men's Fast Pitch
2005	Brian Malakowsky	Wells	Team USA Junior Men's Fast Pitch
2006	Chad Boom	Barnesville	Team USA Men's Fast Pitch
2006	Gregg Cascaes	Apple Valley	Team USA Men's Fast Pitch
2006	Lucas Goring	St. Paul	Team USA Men's Fast Pitch
2007	Gregg Cascaes	Apple Valley	Team USA Men's Fast Pitch
2007	Lucas Goring	St. Paul	Team USA Men's Fast Pitch
2008	Kevin Williams	Lake Crystal	Team USA Junior Men's Fast Pitch
2010	Chaun Demars	Becker	Team USA Men's Slow Pitch
2010	Scott Brown	Coon Rapids	Team USA Men's Slow Pitch
2011	Rich "Geno" Buck	Red Wing	Team USA Men's Slow Pitch
2012	Anthony Dress	Rosemount	Team USA Futures Men's Slow Pitch
2012	Brett Meschke	Lake Crystal	Team USA Junior Men's Fast Pitch
2012	Jake Dalton	Lake Crystal	Team USA Junior Men's Fast Pitch
2012	Michael Lewis	Amboy	Team USA Junior Men's Fast Pitch
2012	Spencer Yackel	Lake Crystal	Team USA Junior Men's Fast Pitch
2013	Andy Vitcak	Oakdale	Team USA Futures Men's Slow Pitch
2013	Anthony Dress	Rosemount	Team USA Futures Men's Slow Pitch
2013	Rich "Geno" Buck	Red Wing	Team USA Men's Slow Pitch
2013	Roman Foore	Rosemount	Team USA Men's Fast Pitch
2014	Andy Vitcak	Oakdale	Team USA Futures Men's Slow Pitch
2014	Lucas Goring	St. Paul	Team USA Men's Fast Pitch
2014	Steven Nessler	North Mankato	Team USA Junior Men's Fast Pitch
2014	Tyler Bouley	Champlin	Team USA Junior Men's Fast Pitch
2014	Tyler Stoffel	North Mankato	Team USA Junior Men's Fast Pitch
2015	Andy Vitcak	Oakdale	Team USA Futures Men's Slow Pitch
2015	Rich "Geno" Buck	Red Wing	Team USA Men's Slow Pitch
2016	Isaac Hormann	Norwood Young America	Team USA Junior Men's Fast Pitch
2016	Steven Nessler	North Mankato	Team USA Junior Men's Fast Pitch
2016	Jeff Lewis	Amboy	Team USA Junior Men's Fast Pitch
2017	Joel Cooley	St. Paul	Team USA Men's Fast Pitch
2018	Jeff Lewis	Amboy	Team USA Junior Men's Fast Pitch
2018	Joel Cooley	St. Paul	Team USA Men's Fast Pitch
2019	Coby Gibbons	White Bear Lake	Team USA Junior Men's Fast Pitch
2019	Joel Cooley	St. Paul	Team USA Men's Fast Pitch
2019	Tyler Bouley	Champlin	Team USA Men's Fast Pitch
2019	Patrick Ellwanger	North St. Paul	Team USA Futures Men's Slow Pitch
2019	Tyler Bouley	Champlin	Team USA Men's Fast Pitch
2020	Megan Higginbotham	Minneapolis	Team USA Women's Slow Pitch
2020	Patrick Ellwanger	North St. Paul	Team USA Futures Men's Slow Pitch
2022	Tyler Bouley	Champlin	Team USA Men's Fast Pitch
2022	Joel Cooley	St. Paul	Team USA Men's Fast Pitch
2022	Mike Lewis	Amboy	Team USA Men's Fast Pitch
2023	Cody Gibbons	St. Paul	Team USA Under 23 Men's Fast Pitch
2023	Frank Kimlinger	St. Paul	Team USA Under 23 Men's Fast Pitch
2023	Cody Gibbons	St. Paul	Team USA Under 18 Men's Fast Pitch
2024	Cody Gibbons	St. Paul	Team USA Men's Fast Pitch
2024	Frank Kimlinger	St. Paul	Team USA Men's Fast Pitch
2024	Jeff Lewis	Amboy	Team USA Men's Fast Pitch
2025	Cody Gibbons	St. Paul	Team USA Men's Fast Pitch
2025	Frank Kimlinger	St. Paul	Team USA Men's Fast Pitch
2025	Jeff Lewis	Amboy	Team USA Men's Fast Pitch
2025	Carlie Hart	Lake Elmo	Team USA Women's Slow Pitch
2025	Zachary Woodside	Mounds View	Team USA Futures Men's Slow Pitch
2026	Tom Chech	St. Paul	Team USA Men's Fast Pitch
2026	Frank Kimlinger	St. Paul	Team USA Men's Fast Pitch
2026	Jeff Lewis	Amboy	Team USA Men's Fast Pitch
2026	Ty Buck	Red Wing	Team USA Futures Men's Slow Pitch
2026	Carlie Hart	Lake Elmo	Team USA Women's Slow Pitch

=== Minnesotans coaching national teams ===
Year	Coach	Community	National team
2001	Wayne Hohenstein	Vernon Center	Team USA Junior Men's Fastpitch Assistant Coach
2016	Dan Nessler	North Mankato	Team USA Junior Men's Fastpitch Assistant Coach
2022	Dave Meyers	Duluth	Team USA Junior Men's Fastpitch Assistant Coach
2025	Roman Foore	Rosemount	Team USA Men's Fast Pitch Assistant Coach
