= Fanny Butcher =

American literary critic

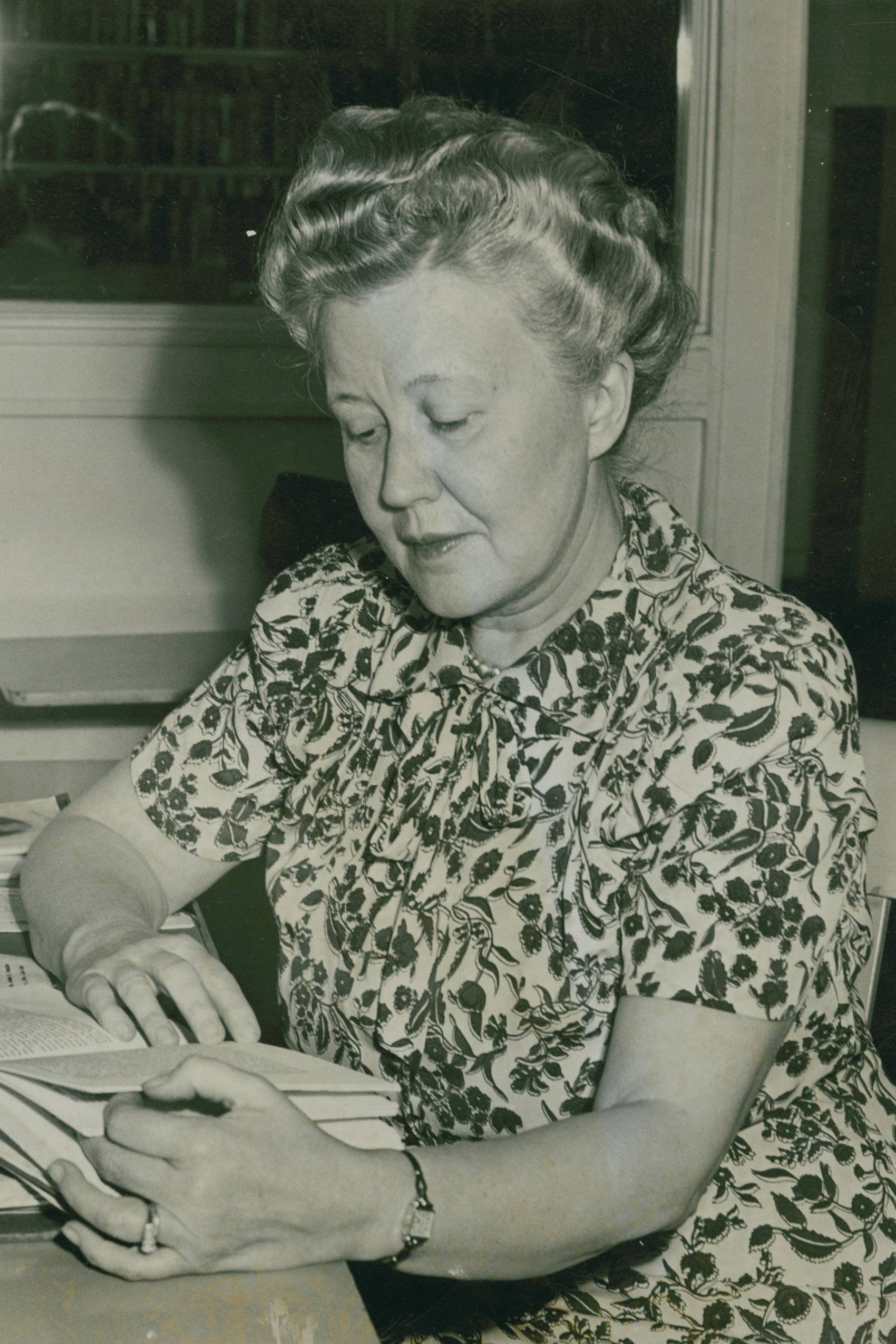

Fanny Butcher (née Fanny Amanda Butcher; September 13, 1888 – May 11, 1987) was a long time writer and literary critic for the Chicago Tribune newspaper.

== Personal life ==
Butcher was born on September 13, 1888, in Fredonia, Kansas, to Levi Oliver Butcher (1862–1929) and Hattie May Young (maiden; 1864–1947). Her family moved to Chicago when she was 3-years-old and she later attended Lewis Institute (now Illinois Institute of Technology) from 1906 to 1908. She graduated from the University of Chicago in 1910. In 1935 Butcher married Richard Drummond Bokum, Jr. (1885–1963), an advertising executive. They had no children.

== Career ==
She began at the Tribune in 1913 and held various positions including society editor, club editor, crime reporter, fashion editor, women's assistant editor, special correspondent, music assistant critic. In 1923 she became the literary editor and held the position for 40 years until her retirement in 1963.

A cartoon by Helen E. Hokinson of The New Yorker on the back cover of Fanny Butcher's autobiography, Many Lives – One Love, depicts a bookstore clerk in the biography section showing a book to an elderly lady, saying:

Hugh Walpole liked it, Fanny Butcher liked it, Wm. Rose Benét liked it, and Mrs. Roosevelt liked it, but it isn't very good.

— © 1940; © renewed 1968; The New Yorker

From this, one might infer that Fanny Butcher was a household name among bookish Americans in 1940. In 2016, Butcher was inducted into the Chicago Literary Hall of Fame.

== See also ==
- Arthur Meeker, Jr.

== Bibliography ==
- Butcher, Fanny (1972). Many Lives – One Love (autobiography). A Cass Canfield Book (1st ed.). Harper & Row – via Internet Archive. LCCN 70-156511; ISBN 0-0601-0402-3, 978-0-0601-0402-3; OCLC 731181946 (all editions).
