= Dorothy Aldis =

American writer and author

- Born: Dorothy Keeley; March 13, 1896; Chicago, Illinois, United States
- Died: July 4, 1966 (aged 70); Lake Forest, Illinois, United States
- Education: Miss Porter's School, Smith College
- Occupations: Author, poet
- Spouse: Graham Aldis (m. 1922)
- Children: 1 son, 3 daughters
- Parents: James Keeley (father); Gertrude Keeley (mother)
- Awards: Children's Reading Round Table Award, 1966-67

Dorothy Aldis (March 13, 1896 – July 4, 1966) was an American writer of children's literature and poet.

== Life ==
Dorothy Keeley was born in Chicago on March 13, 1896, to James Keeley, managing editor of the Chicago Tribune, and Gertrude Keeley. The youngest of four girls, Aldis was educated privately, and attended the prestigious Miss Porter's School. When she was 17, Aldis attended Smith College for two years before returning to Chicago.

Like her mother, who reported for the Sunday Tribune, Aldis began working for the paper, writing columns on decorating, pets, and personals. On June 15, 1922, she married Graham Aldis. The couple lived in Chicago and had four children: Mary, Owen, and twins Peggy and Ruth.

Her first publications were books of poetry for children. In 1929, she began writing children's fiction. Unable to find time to write at home with her growing family, Aldis often took her typewriter to a local park to work. In this way, she wrote seven novels and three books of poetry during the 1930s. Several of her best-known poems were published in these early years, such as "Snow", "Little" and "Hiding".

I'm hiding, I'm hiding
And no one knows where;
For all they can see is my
Toes and my hair

And I just heard my father
Say to my mother -
"But, darling, he must be
Somewhere or other;

Have you looked in the inkwell?..."

She also wrote short stories and poetry for Ladies Home Journal, Harper's and The New Yorker, among others. Aldis published 29 books, including a Beatrix Potter biography titled Nothing is Impossible. According to Joyce Kinkead in American Writers for Children, Aldis "was recognized as a major contributor to children's literature". After her death in 1966, Elementary English called her "The Poet Laureate of Young Children." She was a recipient of the Children's Reading Roundtable Award of Chicago.

== Selected works ==
- Jane's Father (1929)
- Time at Her Heels (1937)
- Dark Summer (1947)
- Everything and Anything (illustrated by Helen D. Jameson)
- Here, There and Everywhere
- Dumb Stupid David (illustrated by Jane Miller)
- Hiding (illustrated by Heather Collins)
- Cindy (1959)
- Best in Children's Books: Volume 31 (various authors and illustrators: featuring, Windy Wash Day and Other Poems by Dorothy Aldis with illustrations by Maurice Sendak) (1960)
- Nothing is Impossible: The Story of Beatrix Potter (illustrated by Richard Cuffari)
- Grande Webos en la Boca: A comprehensive story of good writing
- Quick as a Wink (1960) (illustrated by Peggy Westphal, her daughter in her debut as a professional illustrator)
- Everybody Says
