= Hazel MacDonald =

American journalist and foreign correspondent

Hazel MacDonald (1890-1971) was a Chicago journalist and foreign correspondent. Born in 1890, she was a pioneer in the field at a time when female newspaper writers were rare. She graduated from Northwestern University in 1913, and wrote for Photoplay magazine, which is considered the precursor to modern celebrity magazines, from 1916 to 1918. She then wrote movie reviews for the Chicago American. This job led her to briefly transition into screenwriting in Los Angeles, before she tired of show business and returned to journalism.

During the 1920s, she split her time between Los Angeles and Chicago, writing the "woman’s angle" on current events (especially crime) for the Los Angeles Herald, the Chicago American and the Seattle Post-Intelligencer. After being let go by the Chicago American for joining a picket line in the 1938 Newspaper Guild strike, she became the first accredited female foreign correspondent during World War II. She reported from the front lines in England, Italy and France for the Chicago Times. MacDonald continued to write until 1946, when she retired and married fellow foreign correspondent Robert J. Casey. She died in 1971 at the age of 81.
