= Chicago American =

Newspaper

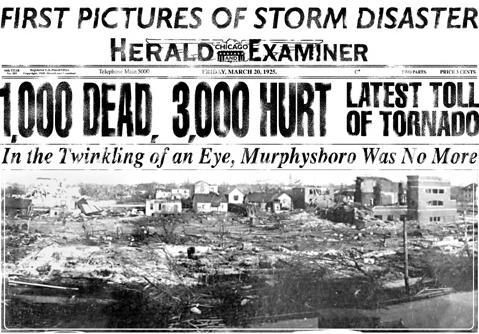
Chicago Herald-Examiner headline after the deadly Tri-State tornado in 1925 – in reality, the death toll was in excess of 695, not 1,000.

The Chicago American was an American newspaper published in Chicago under various names from 1900 until its dissolution in 1975. Its afternoon publication was known as the Chicago American, while its evening publication was known as the Chicago Evening American.

== History ==
The paper's first edition came out on July 4, 1900, as Hearst's Chicago American. It became the Morning American in 1902 with the appearance of an afternoon edition. The morning and Sunday papers were renamed as the Examiner in 1904. James Keeley bought the Chicago Record-Herald and Chicago Inter-Ocean in 1914, merging them into a single newspaper known as the Herald. William Randolph Hearst purchased the paper from Keeley in 1918.

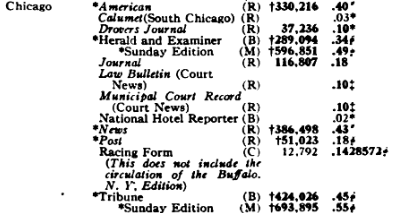
Circulation figures for Chicago newspapers appearing in Editor & Publisher in 1919. The American's circulation of 330,216 placed it third in the city, behind the Chicago Tribune (424,026) and Chicago Daily News (386,498), and ahead of the Chicago Herald-Examiner (289,094).

Distribution of the Herald Examiner after 1918 was controlled by gangsters. Dion O'Banion, Vincent Drucci, Hymie Weiss and Bugs Moran first sold the Tribune. They were then recruited by Moses Annenberg, who offered more money to sell the Examiner, later the Herald-Examiner. This "selling" consisted of pressuring stores and news dealers. In 1939, Annenberg was sentenced to three years in prison for fraud and died in prison.

The newspaper joined the Associated Press on October 31, 1932.

Under pressure from his lenders, Hearst consolidated the American and the Herald-Examiner in 1939. It continued as the Chicago Herald-American until 1953 when it became the Chicago American. The American was bought by the Chicago Tribune in 1956, and was renamed as Chicago's American in 1959.

As with many other afternoon daily newspapers the paper suffered in postwar years from declining circulation figures caused in part by television news and in part by population shifts from city to suburbs. The paper continued as an afternoon broadsheet until 1969 when the Tribune converted the paper to the tabloid-format Chicago Today. Measures to bolster the paper were unsuccessful, and Chicago Today published its final issue on September 13, 1974. The Chicago Tribune inherited many of the Today's writers and staff and became a 24-hour operation.

The American was the product of the merger or acquisition of 14 predecessor newspapers and inherited the tradition and the files of all of them.

As an afternoon paper, the American was dependent on street sales rather than subscriptions, and breaking news helped bring in street sales.

When Frank Lloyd Wright announced plans to build a mile-high building in Chicago, the American stole the drawings and printed them.

The tradition was exemplified by the longtime night city editor of the American, Harry "Romy" Romanoff, who could create news stories almost at will with only a telephone. He ran the city room at night with the help of two rewrite men (including Mike McGovern, noted below), one night photo editor, a sports desk editor (Brent Musburger's first job out of journalism school), and one night copy boy who cut and pasted AP and UPI wires for Harry's review. Since the afternoon paper was put together the previous evening, the night city editor was the key news editor. Romanoff enjoyed the fearful but absolute regard of pressmen, the composing room and the entire night staff of the Tribune Tower, which owned and housed the Chicago American's operations in its final decades.

One night, floods threatened Southern Illinois, and the American did not have a big story for the front page. Romanoff called fire departments and police stations throughout the region, posing as "Captain Parmenter of the state police" (a nonexistent individual), urging them to take action. One fire department, bemused by the call, asked what they should do. "Ring those fire bells! Call out the people!" Romanoff then turned to his rewrite man to dictate the lead story:

Fire bells rang over southern Illinois as police and fire departments called out the people to warn them of impending floods.

It never did flood, but the American had its banner headline. These headlines were necessary for sales of the early editions. Later in the day, breaking news would generally replace them or reduce their importance. Of course, many stories developed in this way were genuine scoops that would be expanded in later editions.

The American gave the same attention to smaller stories as to large ones. It was usually first with police news. One notable headline:

Mother of 14 kids kills father of 9 in police station

Headquarters for the paper was the Hearst Building, located at 326 West Madison Street in Chicago. In 1961, the offices of Chicago's American were moved adjacent to the Tribune Tower at 435 North Michigan Avenue, where they would remain until the ultimate demise of Chicago Today in 1974.

== Notable people ==
In addition to Romanoff, notable American staff members included:

- Frank R. Adams, reporter for Herald-Examiner, author, songwriter and screenwriter
- Ann Barzel, dance critic, 1951-1974
- Seymour Berkson, reporter for Herald-Examiner, later general manager of the International News Service and publisher for the New York Journal-American
- Claude Binyon, reporter for the Examiner, became a Hollywood screenwriter and director
- Arthur Brisbane, named editor of the Herald-Examiner in 1918; later became a renowned New York newspaper editor and syndicated columnist
- Warren Brown, sportswriter, covered 50 consecutive World Series; winner of Spink Award from baseball's Hall of Fame;
- John P. Carmichael, sportswriter 1927-32, then Chicago Daily News columnist and sports editor until 1972
- S. S. Chamberlain, Chicago Examiner editor; later editor of Cosmopolitan magazine
- Bartlett Cormack, reporter for the American, then a Hollywood screenwriter whose films included The Racket and Fury, as well as the original adaptation of The Front Page
- Homer Davenport, cartoonist, came to Chicago Herald in 1893 during World's Columbian Exposition
- Billy DeBeck, cartoonist, creator of comic strip Barney Google
- John Denson, editor; executive editor of New York Journal-American; managing editor of Newsweek
- Eddie Doherty, reporter for the Examiner and American, then Oscar-nominated screenwriter of The Fighting Sullivans
- Charles Dryden, considered the best baseball writer of his era; first hired in 1898 by the New York Journal; capped his career with the Tribune and Herald-Examiner; coined the name "Hitless Wonders" for the 1906 White Sox
- Carl Ed, cartoonist, creator of comic strip Harold Teen
- James Enright, sportswriter and basketball referee, inducted into the Naismith Memorial Basketball Hall of Fame
- Dave Feldman, the American's horse-racing writer and handicapper from 1939-1968, then the same for the Daily News and Sun-Times
- Leo Fischer, sports editor of the American from 1943-1969, and also after the paper became Chicago Today; for four years, simultaneously was president of the National Basketball League, precursor to today's NBA
- Tom Fitzpatrick, worked as a reporter for the American before joining the Sun-Times and winning a 1970 Pulitzer Prize
- Hugh Fullerton, while covering the 1919 World Series for the Herald-Examiner, became suspicious of the Chicago White Sox's play; his articles culminated in eight Sox players being accused of conspiring with gamblers and subsequently being banned from baseball for life
- Chester Gould, cartoonist; creator of Dick Tracy; drew a number of comic strips for the Evening American before being hired away by the Chicago Tribune in 1931
- Robert Gruenberg, Washington bureau chief for the American, 1963–65
- Richard Hainey, the American's executive editor. Bob Hainey, his brother and a Sun-Times copy chief, was found dead on a Chicago street at 35; the circumstances were addressed by Bob's son, GQ magazine editor Michael Hainey, in a 2013 book, After Visiting Friends.
- Sydney J. Harris, wrote for the Herald-Examiner from 1934-41 before launching a long career as a columnist with the Daily News
- George Wheeler Hinman, Herald-Examiner publisher, after first being owner and editor of the Chicago Inter Ocean; died in 1929
- Walter Howey, managing editor of the American, beginning in 1917; widely presumed to be the inspiration for the colorful character of editor "Walter Burns" in the play The Front Page and subsequent film adaptations, including His Girl Friday
- Harold L. Ickes, reporter for the Record at the turn of the century; U.S. Secretary of the Interior 1933-46
- James Keeley, owned the Herald from 1914–18; also served it as a World War I correspondent
- Frank King, cartoonist 1906-09; creator of Gasoline Alley
- Ring Lardner, writer for Examiner in 1900s before becoming Tribune columnist and renowned author
- Jonathan Latimer, crime reporter, covering Al Capone and others for the Herald-Examiner, before becoming a novelist and Hollywood screenwriter; his scripts included Topper Returns, The Glass Key and The Big Clock
- Jack Mabley, columnist and associate editor for the American and Chicago Today 1961-1974; one of his most famous columns was about the measured water pressure during commercial breaks on national TV broadcasts, determining that viewers were using the toilet during the breaks
- Hazel MacDonald, born in 1890, wrote for Photoplay magazine, then reviewed films for the American until she was let go for crossing a picket line in 1938; became a war correspondent for the Chicago Daily Times
- Charles Archibald MacLellan, illustrator for the Examiner, later drew many covers for the Saturday Evening Post
- Tiny Maxwell, football player; cub reporter for the Record-Herald; college football's Maxwell Award is named for him
- Maxwell McCrohon, American reporter in 1958; became managing editor of Chicago Today in 1970; named editor of the Tribune in 1972, and later was the Los Angeles Herald-Examiner editor when that paper closed
- Michael McGovern, New York Daily News investigative reporter; once went door-to-door through Evanston, Illinois asking each woman in one neighborhood if she was the illegitimate daughter of Warren G. Harding
- Buddy McHugh, thinly disguised as "McCue" in The Front Page
- Arthur Meeker, Jr., novelist and socialite, wrote travel articles for the American
- Merrill C. Meigs, publisher during the 1920s; also an aviator, for whom Meigs Field was named
- Edgar Munzel, baseball writer, later of the Sun-Times, winner of Spink Award, earning him induction into the Baseball Hall of Fame
- Brent Musburger, night sports editor of the American; became a prominent television sports personality for CBS and ABC; penned an infamous column describing Tommie Smith and John Carlos as "black-skinned storm troopers" for their protest of racial injustice in the United States during the 1968 Summer Olympics
- George Murray, was once sent to Central America and told to "find a lost city," which he promptly did; wrote a memoir about the paper called The Madhouse on Madison Street
- Wallace Rice, reporter for the Herald-American; author; designed the Flag of Chicago
- Charles Edward Russell, muckraking journalist for the American in the early 20th century; 1928 Pulitzer Prize-winning author
- E.C. Segar, cartoonist for the American, creator of Popeye
- Vaughn Shoemaker, two-time Pulitzer Prize-winning cartoonist; ended his career with Chicago's American and Chicago Today, retiring in 1972 after drawing approximately 14,000 cartoons
- Sidney Smith, cartoonist for the Examiner, 1908–11
- Wallace Smith, correspondent, covered Pancho Villa campaigns and Washington D.C. politics; became a Hollywood screenwriter, his films including 1927's Two Arabian Knights and 1934's The Captain Hates the Sea
- Wendell Smith, pioneering African American sports reporter who was requested by Branch Rickey to travel with Jackie Robinson while he was breaking into triple-A and Major League Baseball; later a sportscaster for WGN-TV
- Ashton Stevens, drama critic for Examiner and Herald American; inspired Joseph Cotten's character in Citizen Kane
- Roger Treat, vocal critic of segregation and editor of the first Pro Football Encyclopedia
- William Veeck, Sr., sports columnist who was hired away to be Chicago Cubs vice-president by William Wrigley Jr. in 1917 after a series he wrote criticizing the team; after the Cubs won the 1918 National League pennant, he was promoted to club president
- Lloyd Wendt, editor of the American from 1961–69; editor and publisher of Chicago Today 1969-70
- Brand Whitlock, reporter for the Herald; later mayor of Toledo, Ohio and ambassador to Belgium
- Frank Willard, cartoonist 1914-18, creator of Moon Mullins

Also:

- John F. Kennedy, the future U.S. president, worked as a reporter at the Chicago Herald-American after serving in the Navy during World War II in 1945, where he covered the United Nations Conference held in San Francisco and the elections that ousted Winston Churchill in 1945 from London. The job was lined up by his influential father, Joseph P. Kennedy.

In the end, TV news brought an end to most afternoon papers, but up until the 1970s, Chicago had a competitive journalistic scene unmatched by most other American cities, five daily newspapers and four wire services in competition, and none were more competitive than Chicago's American.

== The American's predecessor and successor newspapers ==
1. Morning Record, March 13, 1893 – March 27, 1901 (originally News Record, a.k.a. Morning News, a.k.a. Chicago Daily News (Morning Edition) beginning July 24, 1881)
2. Chicago Times, June 1, 1861 – March 4, 1895
3. Chicago Republican, May 30, 1865 – March 22, 1872
4. Inter Ocean, March 25, 1872 – May 10, 1914
5. Chicago Daily Telegraph, March 21, 1878 – May 9, 1881
6. Morning Herald, May 10, 1893 – March 3, 1895
7. Times-Herald, March 4, 1895 – March 26, 1901
8. Chicago American, July 4, 1900 – August 27, 1939
9. Chicago Record-Herald, March 28, 1901 – May 10, 1914
10. Chicago Examiner, March 3, 1907 – May 1, 1918
11. Chicago Record Herald & Interocean, May 11, 1914 – June 1, 1914
12. Chicago Herald, June 14, 1914 – May 1, 1918
13. Herald-Examiner, May 2, 1918 – August 26, 1939
14. Herald American, August 26, 1939 – April 5, 1953
15. The Chicago American, April 6, 1953 – September 23, 1959
16. Chicago's New American, Sep 23, 1959 – October 24, 1959 (purchased by Chicago Tribune)
17. Chicago's American, October 25, 1959 – April 27, 1969
18. Chicago Today American, April 28, 1969 – May 23, 1970
19. Chicago Today, May 24, 1970 – September 13, 1974

== See also ==
- Wandt v. Hearst's Chicago American
