= Robert Gruenberg =

American journalist (1922–1992)

Robert Gruenberg (September 13, 1922 – September 29, 1992) was a Chicago political journalist best known for his work with the Chicago Daily News.

== Biography ==
Born in Chicago, after high school he served on the Civilian Conservation Corps in Wisconsin. Gruenberg then returned to Chicago in 1938, where he began clerking for the Chicago Daily News before being drafted into the Army in 1943. He served in the Pacific Theater and in the occupation army in Japan through December 1946, rising to the rank of staff sergeant and working in communications. Returning to the Daily News, he worked his way up at the paper as a night-shift reporter while attending Northwestern University, having attended Herzl Community College (now Malcolm X College) before going off to the war.

Gruenberg became a full-fledged political reporter for the Chicago Daily News after finishing his Army tour of duty in 1946. He began covering state and local affairs while finishing his degree at Northwestern. In 1956, he shared in the Daily News Pulitzer Prize for Public Service reporting for the paper's uncovering the theft of state funds by Illinois state auditor Orville Hodge. In 1961, Gruenberg left the Daily News and moved to Washington to join the metropolitan news staff of the Washington Star. After almost two years there, he became Washington Bureau chief for the Chicago's American from 1963 to 1965, then returned to the Daily News in Chicago for three years. His reporting on the Civil Rights Movement won him the first James P. McGuire Award of the Illinois American Civil Liberties Union in 1968. He was promoted to the Daily News Washington bureau in 1968. After the Daily News shut down in 1978, he worked with the Communications Department of the National Education Association until his retirement. He died in 1992.
