= Charles Archibald MacLellan =

American painter

Charles A. MacLellan
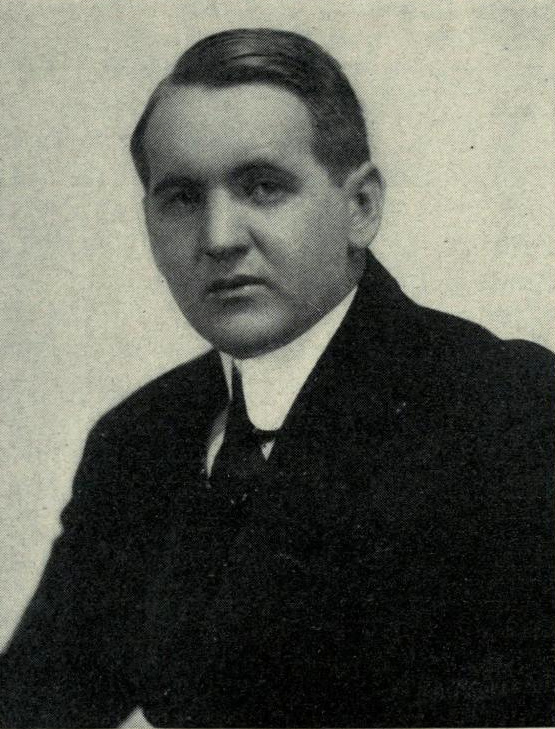
- Born: June 22, 1885; Trenton, Ontario, Canada
- Died: October 4, 1961 (aged 76); Wilmington, Delaware, United States

Charles Archibald MacLellan (June 22, 1885 - October 4, 1961) was a 20th-century American painter and illustrator. His works enjoyed a wide-ranging, popular appeal in the United States, and he was probably one of the most recognizable cover illustrators of the day.

== Early life ==
Charles Archibald MacLellan, son of Charles and Augusta (Clute) McLellan, was born June 22, 1885, in Trenton, Ontario, Canada. His father, Dr. Charles McLellan was born in Scotland in 1844. He was an orphaned and subsequently brought to Canada by his uncle in 1852. Dr. McLellan received his M.D. at the University of Toronto, and practiced there until 1892 when, by way of the Grand Trunk Railway, he moved to Chicago.

After graduating from high school and having completed his preparatory work, young Charles intended to enroll at the University of Chicago. However, he opted to begin formal studies at the School of the Art Institute of Chicago instead, where several well-known artists such as Dunn, Shrader, and Hoskins were at that time. MacLellan spent about two and a half years at the institute before he accepted a position at an engraving house in Chicago, ultimately concluding his studies under the tutelage of the legendary Howard Pyle. Soon afterward, he leased a studio of his own, in the Auditorium Tower.

While in Chicago, Charles A. MacLellan illustrated several magazine covers, designs for stained glass windows, advertisement posters for Marshall Field & Company, and a myriad of newspaper sketches for the Chicago Examiner.

== Career ==
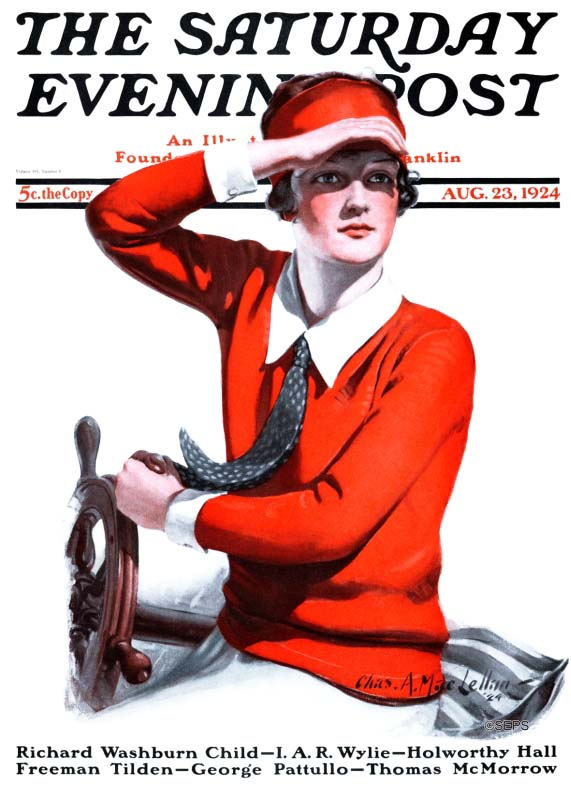
23 Aug 1924 cover of The Saturday Evening Post by MacLellan.

In 1909, "Mac," as he was referred to by his friends, relocated to a studio that was built by Howard Pyle at 1305 North Franklin Street, Wilmington, Delaware. At that time, MacLellan began painting calendars for Rand McNally & Co., establishing a highly successful illustration career that lasted through the first half of the twentieth century.

MacLellan is best known by virtue of his many illustrations featured on the cover of The Saturday Evening Post. Between 1913 and 1936, MacLellan's work appeared on forty-four Saturday Evening Post covers, making him one of the most prolific Post cover illustrators of his day. MacLellan specialized in the female form, and nearly all of his cover illustrations feature a woman as the central, and often only, subject.

During the early 1930s, Charles A. MacLellan feared that he would lose his eyesight and that he would be unable to continue working as an artist. Not surprisingly, he decided to travel west, in all probability, to find a new direction in life. Fortunately, he didn't lose his eyesight, and returned to Wilmington to concentrate on teaching and portrait painting.

== Awards ==
Throughout his career, MacLellan received numerous awards and accolades, including those from the Wilmington Society of the Fine Arts, the Pasadena Art Institute, the Pennsylvania Academy of the Fine Arts, the Terry Art Institute, and the Delaware Art Museum, which owns three of his oil paintings; "A Young Singer," "Tinker Bell," and "Attic Finery." The Studio Group in Wilmington owns one of his studies for a portrait, "Head of a Girl," and the Brandywine River Museum in Chadds Ford Township, Pennsylvania, owns a commissioned landscape by MacLellan as well.

== Other interests ==
Charles A. MacLellan's hobbies included gardening, golfing, and occasionally acquiring antique furniture on behalf of the Winterthur Museum in Winterthur, Delaware. In fact, in 1926, he was chairman of an exhibition presented by the Wilmington Society of the Fine Arts entitled "Early American Furniture."

MacLellan was also a member of the Accessions Committee at the Wilmington Society of the Fine Arts from 1943 until 1958, and he taught at the Studio Group, located at Howard Pyle's old studio, from 1943 until his death in 1961.

After his death, a memorial exhibition was held at 1305 North Franklin Street, from December 3 through December 17, 1961. Thirty-three works of art were displayed, including items on loan from the Delaware Art Museum, as well as items from the collection of Mr. and Mrs. Caesar Grasselli, Mr. and Mrs. David Stockwell, Mr. and Mrs. Lammot du Pont Copeland, Mr. and Mrs. Alfred Bissell, Mr. and Mrs. Wm. A. Worth, and Mr. and Mrs. George Bissell.
