= Wandt v. Hearst's Chicago American =

- Court: Wisconsin Supreme Court
- Full case name: Wandt, Respondent, v. Heart's Chicago American, Appellant.
- Decided: October 9, 1906
- Citation: 109 N.W. 70; 129 Wis. 419

Case history
- Appealed from: Milwaukee County Circuit Court

Holding
- Publication of a picture with a libelous statement may constitute libel even if a different name is present in the statement.

Court membership
- Judges sitting: John B. Winslow, Roujet D. Marshall, Joshua Eric Dodge, Robert G. Siebecker, James C. Kerwin
- Chief judge: John B. Cassoday

Case opinions
- Decision by: Winslow

Keywords
- Contract law; Defamation; Libel

Wandt v. Hearst's Chicago American,129 Wis. 419, 109 NW 70 (1906), was a Wisconsin Supreme Court case wherein the court ruled that a photographic association with a libelous article can be considered libel in itself, even if a different name is present in the article.

== Background ==
On August 17, the newspaper Chicago American ran a picture of Rose Wandt next to an article entitled "Suicide Girl Laid to Rest" which was actually about Evelyn Daly, a woman who repeatedly attempted suicide and had finally succeeded after twenty-five attempts. This article circulated through Milwaukee and included a detailed list of Daly's recent suicide attempts. Wandt sued the newspaper in Milwaukee County Circuit Court for libel.

== Judgment ==
Justice Winslow agreed that although there was no statement that Wandt was the "Suicide Girl," a printed statement was not needed for Chicago American's actions to be libelous.

The newspaper argued that Wandt's friends and family would not be misled by the article because they would recognize her in the picture, read the Daly's name in the article, and conclude that it was not about Wandt. The court dismissed this argument, asserting that even if that were true, there was still a number of people who barely knew Wandt who may conclude that the article was about her or that Daly was her name. The fact that some people may have recognized Wandt could only mitigate possible damages but not defeat a claim of libel.

By publishing Wandt's picture under a libelous headline, even if there was a different name within the article, the court held that Chicago American had committed libel as a matter of law.

== Significance ==
Wandt is often brought up when discussing cases involving libel by association, often in cases regarding mislabeled photographs.
