= Chicago Inter Ocean =

Daily newspaper

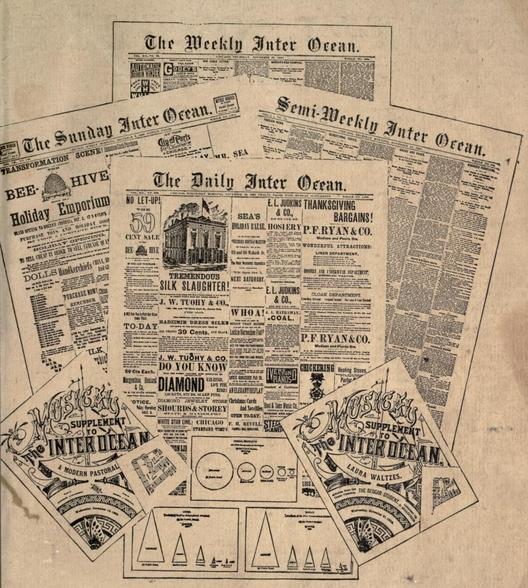
- 1883 Advertisement for editions of the Inter Ocean
- Founded: 1865 (as the Chicago Republican)
- Ceased publication: 1914; 112 years ago
- Headquarters: Chicago

The Chicago Inter Ocean, also known as the Chicago Inter-Ocean, is the name used for most of its history by a newspaper published in Chicago, Illinois, from 1865 until 1914. Its editors included Charles A. Dana and Byron Andrews.

== History ==
=== Founding ===
The paper can be traced to 1865 with the founding of the Chicago Republican, a newspaper supporting the Republican party. Jacob Bunn, a prominent Illinois financier and industrialist, was the principal founder, and at one time the sole owner, of the Chicago Republican Company; he cooperated with several other Illinois financiers to establish the Republican. After both success and the chaos of the 1871 Chicago Fire, the paper was relaunched in 1872 as the Chicago-based Inter Ocean, intended to appeal to upscale readers. William Penn Nixon became president and editor-in-chief of the Inter Ocean in 1876 and remained until his death in 1912.

=== Growth ===
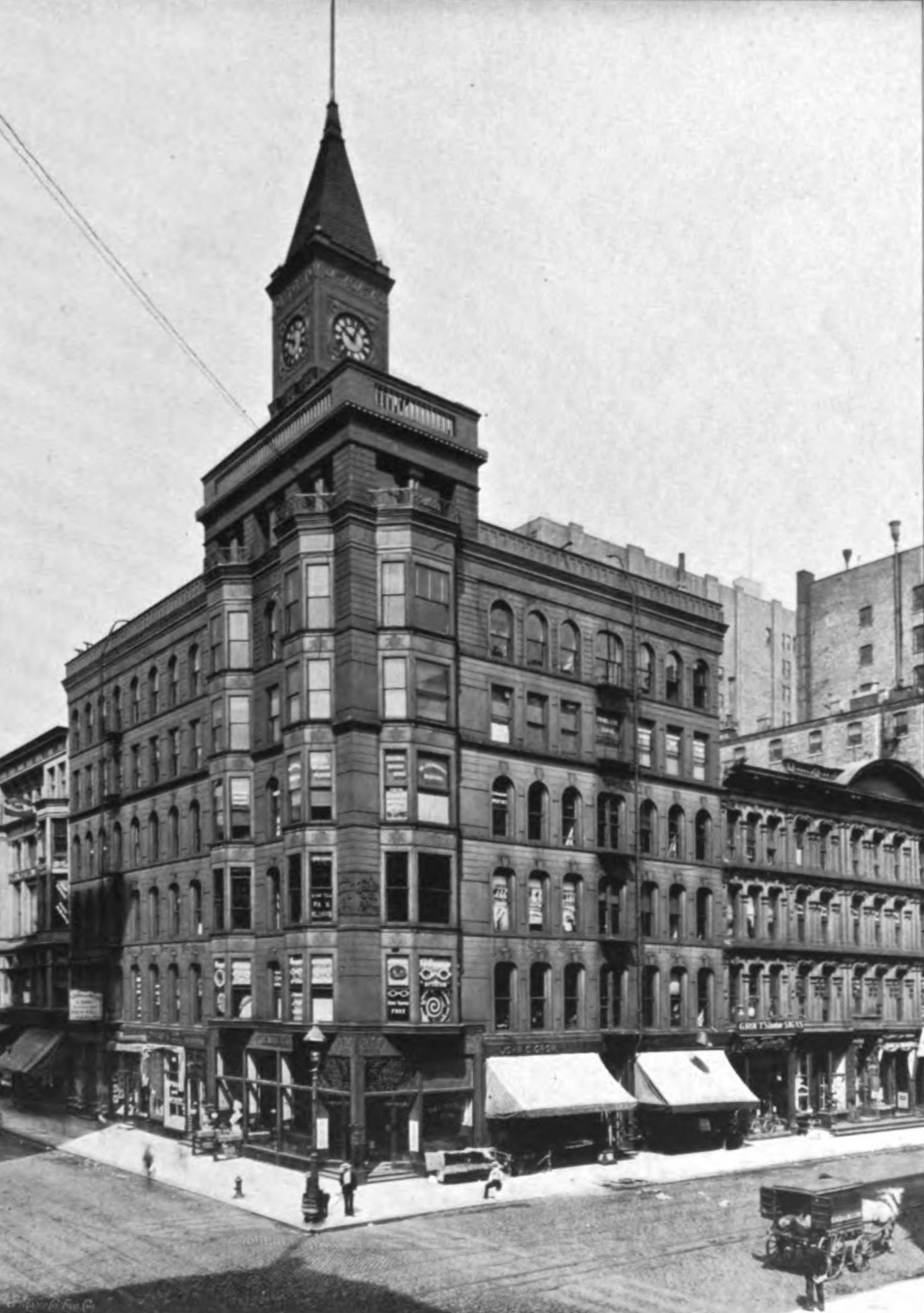
Building occupied by the Inter Ocean from 1890 until 1901

With the building of transcontinental railroads, it was possible to deliver periodical newspapers by mail throughout the central and western U.S. The Inter Ocean developed a family of semi-weekly, weekly and Sunday editions that were intended to become a definitive source of news for businesspeople throughout the American West, and in fact fulfilled that role for several decades.

The growth of linotype newspapers printed on inexpensive newsprint in the 1890s led to another upheaval in the newspaper industry. Many non-Chicago subscribers to the Inter Ocean no longer needed the weekly paper and dropped their subscriptions.

The weakened paper fell in 1895 into the hands of Charles Yerkes, the notorious Chicago streetcar boss, who returned the newspaper to the partisan, subordinate role it had fulfilled in its youth. George Wheeler Hinman bought a controlling interest in the paper in 1906 and sold it to H. H. Kohlsaat in 1912.

It published books about the Chicago Centennial.

=== Demise ===
The paper stopped publication in 1914. Hinman bought back the paper at a receiver's sale in May 1914 (which came about because Kolhsaat had failed to pay the balance owed on a note used to purchase the paper) and immediately sold it to James Keeley, then general manager of the Chicago Tribune, who also bought the Chicago Record Herald at the same time. Readers decided that Keeley's new consolidated newspaper should be named The Chicago Herald, which name it held until it was bought by William Randolph Hearst's Chicago Examiner in 1918. This further consolidation created the Chicago Herald-Examiner.

=== Locations ===
The Inter Ocean was published in four locations during its existence.

From 1873 to 1880, it stood at 119 Lake Street, under the old Chicago street numbering.

From 1880 to 1890 it stood at 85 West Madison. In 1889 Adler & Sullivan designed a steel-framed building to be constructed on the small lot at the NWC of Madison and Dearborn, connected to the adjoining five-story Dearborn Building (1872–73) that sat behind, and with a distinctive corner clock-spire. The spire was removed sometime before the building’s demolition. The Inter-Ocean Building was converted into the Hotel Grant around 1895, when the Inter-Ocean newspaper was sold to traction magnate Charles Yerkes. The Grant was considered a second-class hotel. That building was razed in either 1940 or 1941.

The paper's final home was a three-story headquarters built at 57 W. Monroe, completed in 1901 to designs by William Carbys Zimmerman. This building ultimately became the Monroe Theater, which was razed in 1977.

== Notable people ==
- Eunice Gibbs Allyn
- Alice Hobbins Porter
- H. T. Webster
