= James Keeley =

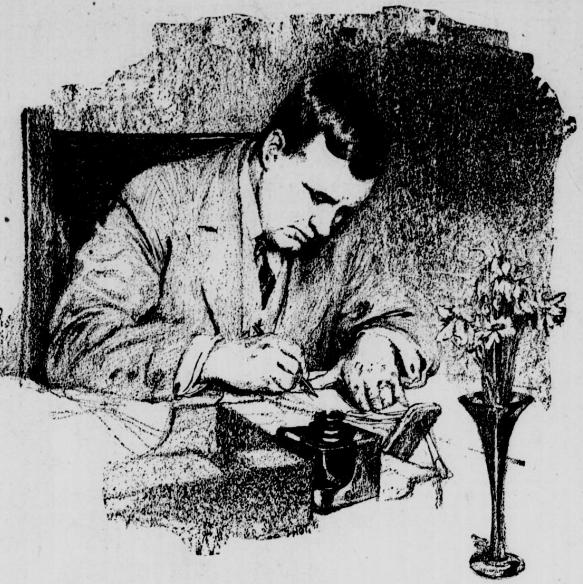
- James Keeley circa 1914
- Born: October 14, 1867
- Died: June 7, 1934 (aged 66)
- Occupations: Journalist, newspaper editor and publisher
- Years active: 1884–1930
- Known for: Managing editor of the Chicago Tribune (1898–1914)
- Spouse: Married (1895–1927)

James Keeley (October 14, 1867 – June 7, 1934) was an Irish journalist, newspaper editor and publisher during the late nineteenth and early twentieth centuries, who served as managing editor of the Chicago Tribune from 1898 to 1914.

Keeley was born in London, England. His mother was a teacher who had been deserted by her Irish Catholic husband. At age 16, he emigrated alone to the United States, settling in Kansas. His career in the newspaper business began as a correspondent for the Kansas City Times, he then worked as a reporter and city editor for newspapers in Memphis and Louisville. By the late 1880s Keeley had joined the Chicago Tribune and enjoyed a notable career with this newspaper, serving as night police reporter, night city editor from 1892 to 1894, city editor from 1894 to 1898, and managing editor and general manager from 1898 to 1914. He served as Dean of the school of journalism at the University of Notre Dame, in South Bend, Indiana, from 1911.

After the deadly Iroquois Theatre fire in 1903, Keeley famously listed all the victims on the front page, leaving the story of what happened to inside the paper, believing that readers wanted to see the names of the dead first. He was also known for lobbying for a "sane Fourth" of July to stop firework deaths, and for tracking down fugitive Chicago bank president Paul O. Stensland. The latter involved getting President Theodore Roosevelt to request of Sultan Moulay Abd al-Azis bin Hassan that Morocco to agree to return Stensland to Chicago via a special extradition process and then Keeley journeying to Tangier with Cook County Assistant State's Attorney Harry Olson to apprehend him. Keeley subsequently donated the $5,000 reward check to the relief fund for the victims of the bank failure caused by Stensland.

In early 1914, Keeley bought two papers, the Chicago Record-Herald and Inter Ocean, combining the two to form the Chicago Herald. He served as the Chicago Herald's editor from 1914 to 1918. From 1917 to 1919, he covered World War I for the Herald in England and France. The Herald was bought by William Randolph Hearst's Chicago Examiner in 1918, and named the Chicago Herald and Examiner.

In addition to his journalistic work, Keeley also served as vice-president of the Pullman Company during the 1920s.

Keeley died at his home in Lake Forest, Illinois on June 7, 1934, after being ill since January with heart disease. His wife, a former newspaper writer for the Sunday Tribune in Boston, whom he married in 1895, died in 1927. Their daughter Dorothy Aldis was a children's author and poet.

== Bibliography ==
- Linn, James Weber (1937). James Keeley, Newspaperman. Bobbs-Merrill Company. (biography of Keeley published in 1937)
