= Phil Georgeff =

Phil Georgeff (/dʒɔːrˈdʒɛf/ jor-JEF; January 1, 1931 – November 7, 2016) was an American horse racing announcer from the Chicago area.

Known as "the voice of Chicago racing", he was the public address announcer at racetracks including Arlington Park, Hawthorne Race Course, and Sportsman's Park from 1959 to 1992. He was also the publicity director at Hawthorne Race Course.

Georgeff earned his BS degree at Northwestern University Medill School of Journalism. He is a member of the Chicagoland Sports Hall of Fame.

Georgeff holds the Guinness Book of World Records for calling 96,131 horse races, including the Arlington Million. He was known for his signature call at the top of the stretch, "Here they come, spinning out of the turn!" That catchphrase was a convenient starting place for TV sports highlight shows, as the replay of any notable race he called would typically be picked up from that point.

He was a close friend and admirer of jockey Eddie Arcaro and has written a biography about him. He has also written several historically based fictional racing mystery novels, including "THOROUGHBRED IN A CLASS BY HIMSELF", "THE MAN WHO LOVED MARIO LANZA"("A Sweet Mystery of Life"), and "THE MAN WHO LOVED EDDIE ARCARO" (Don't Never Get Beat No Noses.)

Georgeff told his life story in the 2002 book And They're Off! : My Years As The Voice Of Thoroughbred Racing (ISBN 0-87833-264-2). He is also the author of the 2003 book Citation: In a Class by Himself (ISBN 0-87833-292-8) that tells the story of U.S. Triple Crown winner Citation.
