= Chicago Record-Herald =

Defunct newspaper in Chicago, Illinois, United States (1901-14)

The Chicago Record-Herald was a newspaper published in Chicago, Illinois from 1901 until 1914. It was the successor to the Chicago Morning Herald, the Chicago Times Herald and the Chicago Record.

H. H. Kohlsaat, owner of the Times-Herald, bought the Chicago Record from Chicago Daily News publisher Victor F. Lawson in 1901 and merged it with the Times-Herald to form the Record-Herald. Frank B. Noyes became part-owner of the new newspaper at the time and served as publisher, with Kohlsaat as editor. Kohlsaat retired from the paper in 1902, but re-purchased it from Noyes in 1910 to serve as editor and publisher.

In May 1914, the circulation of the Chicago Record-Herald was reported to be 149,776 daily and 209,105 on Sunday. It was then acquired by James Keeley, then general manager of the Chicago Tribune, who also bought the Chicago Inter Ocean out of receivership at the same time. Readers decided that Keeley's new consolidated newspaper should be named The Chicago Herald, which name it held until it was bought by William Randolph Hearst's Chicago Examiner in 1918, and named the Chicago Herald and Examiner.
