= James Enright (basketball) =

American basketball referee and sportswriter

James Enright (April 3, 1910 – December 20, 1981) was a college and professional basketball referee and sportswriter. He was born in Sodus, Michigan and began officiating at 20 years old.

After retiring in 1964 from a refereeing career that saw him officiate the 1954 NCAA tournament Final Four and the 1948 and 1952 Olympic basketball qualifying tournaments, Enright resumed a career he had abandoned for refereeing in 1930 and covered basketball and baseball for such publications as The Sporting News and the Chicago Evening American.

In 1968, Enright became president of the United States Basketball Writers Association and, in 1978, in view of his contributions to the game of basketball as a referee, Enright was inducted into the Naismith Memorial Basketball Hall of Fame. He is also a member of the Chicagoland Sports Hall of Fame.
