= Arthur Meeker Jr. =

American novelist

Arthur Meeker Jr. (November 3, 1902 – October 22, 1971) was an American novelist and journalist.

== Early life ==
Meeker was born in Chicago to a prominent, wealthy family on November 3, 1902. He had three sisters. His father retired from his position as an executive with Armour & Co. in 1928 and died in 1946. His mother Grace Murray Meeker died in 1948. The family lived on Prairie Avenue and also owned Arcady Farm near Lake Forest. Meeker studied play-writing at Harvard and Princeton, but left without graduating.

== Career ==
He wrote society and travel articles for the Chicago American, the Chicago Daily News, and the Chicago Herald. He achieved critical acclaim as the author of several historical novels, notably The Ivory Mischief, which was a Book of the Month Club selection. Time said "It seems another of those long (840-page), thickly upholstered Jumbos of period fiction.... But unlike most books of the type, its re-creation is solid, convincing and intimate, its characterizations are shrewd, its style adult, and even the upholstery is interesting." He wrote two novels set in contemporary Chicago, The Far Away Music and Prairie Avenue, which the New York Times called a "light and colorful entertainment."

At the start of his career as a novelist, one report of literary events said:

Quite a formidable person is Arthur Meeker Jr., whose first novel...has just been published....According to his publishers, he has been dubbed "the embryo boy-king of Chicago society" and is "in a fair way to become the Ward McAllister of the West." We are informed further that "hostesses tremble at his epigrams, and the fact that his father was host to Queen Marie and his Royal Highness, David Windsor, is forgotten in dread of the son's gift for putting into words the amusement he finds in watching the pranks of his own 'set'. In brief, a lift of the Meeker eyebrow holds somewhat the same terror that once inhered in the late Mrs. Potter Palmer's frown." Somebody ought to write a book about Mr. Meeker.

Meeker spent part of each year in Europe, became fluent in French, and purchased a chalet in Switzerland on the Bürgenstock above Lucerne. He often accompanied the Chicago socialite-journalist Fanny Butcher and her husband on tours of Europe. He gave up his Chicago home in 1951 for an apartment at 4 Gramercy Park in New York City. Meeker served as president of the Society of Midland Authors and with Butcher co-founded the Chicago chapter of P.E.N. about 1931, serving initially as its secretary.

== Personal life ==
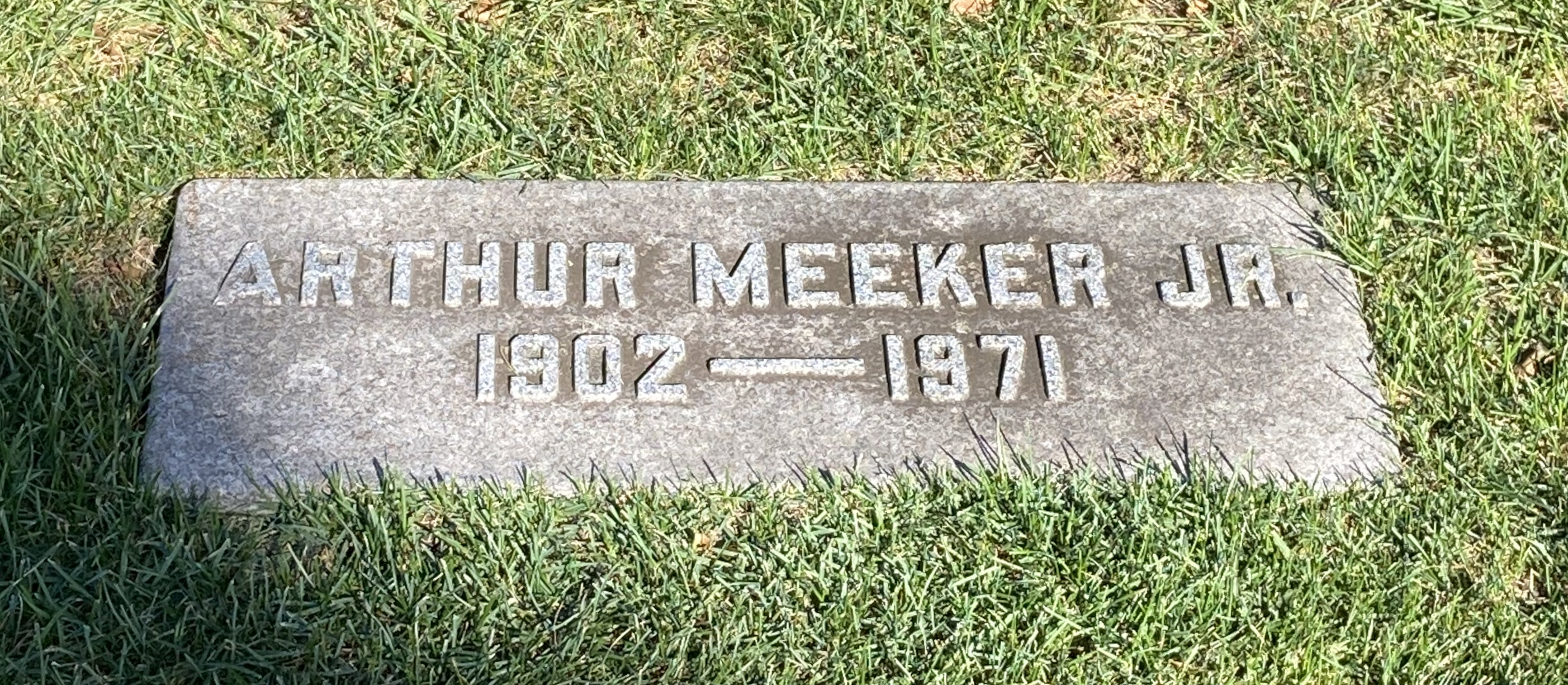
Meeker's grave at Graceland Cemetery

Letters he wrote to his family from Europe in the 1930s suggest he was homosexual. He had a thirty-year relationship with Robert Molnar, with whom he lived from at least 1940 until Meeker's death in their New York City home on October 22, 1971. Meeker named Molnar his heir.

== Works ==
Novels:

- American Beauty (Covici-Friede, 1929)
- Strange Capers (Covici-Friede, 1931)
- Vestal Virgin (NY: G.P. Putnam's Sons 1934)
- Sacrifice to the Graces (NY: D. Appleton-Century, 1937)
- The Ivory Mischief (Boston: Houghton Mifflin, 1942)
- The Far Away Music (Boston: Houghton Mifflin, 1945)
- Prairie Avenue (NY: Knopf, 1949)
- The Silver Plume (NY: Knopf, 1952)

Memoir:

- Chicago, With Love: A Polite and Personal History (NY: Knopf, 1955)
