= Roger Treat =

American sportswriter

Roger Lamport Treat (1906 – October 6, 1969) was an American sportswriter and novelist. As a newspaper columnist, he was a vocal critic of segregation policies in baseball and American football. Treat also edited a major reference work on football, first published in 1952.

== Journalism ==
Treat began his newspaper career as sports editor of the Washington Daily News in 1943 and moved to the Chicago American in 1947. His first published article was a piece for Esquire about boxer Wesley Ramey. He also worked at the Washington Post, Baltimore News-American, The News-Times, and Republican-American.

Treat was an advocate for racial integration in American sports. He helped Jackie Robinson get a tryout with the Brooklyn Dodgers in 1947, and reportedly was involved in the decision to admit Robinson into the National League. In 1946, he helped to start an integrated baseball academy for young men. In 1947, he was let go from his position at the Washington Daily News following a number of columns in which he criticized the Umpires' Association for refusing to referee games featuring racially integrated teams. He also spoke against segregation in amateur baseball and boxing in Washington, DC. Another of Treat's 1947 columns concerned integration efforts at the Chicago Cubs. In 1948, noting that the Chicago White Sox only had one quality infielder, he suggested that the team place Art Wilson, a shortstop for the Birmingham Black Barons, on their roster.

In 1944, in the midst of World War II and its associated shortages, Treat wrote a widely circulated satirical editorial in which he criticized various organizations, including Brown University and Columbia University, for wasting paper by sending out throwaway press releases to newspaper offices.

In 1949, boxer Steve Mamakos sued Treat for libel after Treat published an article titled "Eddie Eagan No. 1 Butcher in Mental Murder of Steve Mamakos".

== Football encyclopedia ==
The Official Encyclopedia of the National Football League (first edition, 1952).

In the early 1950s, Treat launched an effort to document the history of American football. That work culminated in the 1952 publication of The Official Encyclopedia of the National Football League. The book represented the first attempt to document the score of every game in the league's history and every player who had appeared in a game.

A 1952 review of the first edition in the Chicago Tribune called it a "touchdown". Frank Litsky, reviewing the sixth edition in the New York Times in 1969, described it as "monumental" and a "labor of love". A 1969 review of the seventh edition called it "an essential volume for the serious football buff, or already-knowledgable fan, or for the writer".

Treat oversaw the publication of six revised editions before his death in 1969. Thereafter, his daughter-in-law Suzanne Treat became the book's editor, publishing nine more editions between 1970 and 1979.

== Other works ==
In collaboration with Page Cooper, Treat wrote Man o' War, a biography of the racehorse Man o' War, which was published in 1950. The Washington Post called it "first-rate".

Among Treat's other books were a pulp novel called Joy Ride and a biography of his close friend Bernard J. Sheil entitled Bishop Sheil and the CYO, about Sheil's involvement with the Catholic Youth Organization in Chicago. A 1951 review of Bishop Sheil observed that "Treat, obviously, is a sincere admirer of the bishop".

Treat wrote three books for children: Walter Johnson, King of the Pitchers (1948), Duke of the Bruins (1950), and Boy Jockey (1953).

Treat's final book, published after his death, was a novel called The Endless Road. It tells the story of a Chicago newspaperman struggling with alcoholism. The Guardian called it "a heartfelt boost for Alcoholics Anonymous". The book was banned under Ireland's Censorship of Publications Act 1946 for being "indecent or obscene".

== Personal life ==
Treat married his first wife, Eleanor, in June 1935. She filed for divorce in May 1949, alleging desertion.

Treat and his second wife Gerda Dahl Treat, an actor and salesperson, had two sons, John Treat and Peter Treat.

Treat died of lung cancer in Danbury, Connecticut.
