= USA Softball =

US governing body for softball

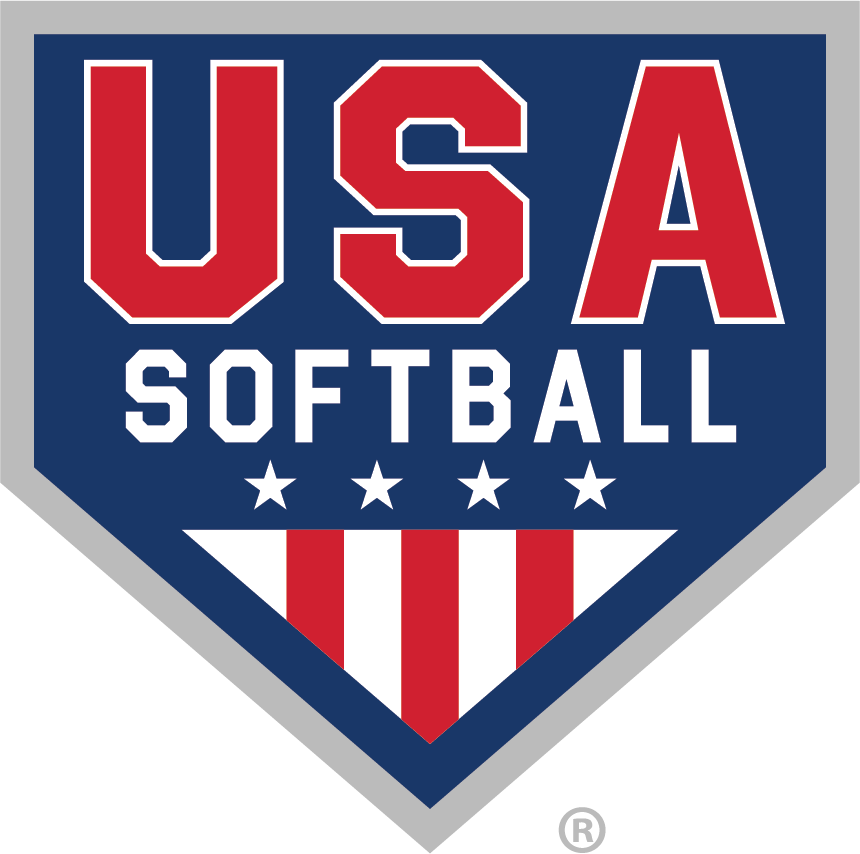
- Formation: 1933 (93 years ago)
- Type: Sport governing body
- Headquarters: Oklahoma City, Oklahoma, U.S.
- Coordinates: 35.523338°N 97.463182°W
- Members: Over one million players, coaches, and umpires are registered members of the sport of softball.
- Chief Executive Officer: Craig Cress
- Website: www.usasoftball.com

USA Softball (formerly the Amateur Softball Association (ASA) and ASA/USA Softball) is the national governing body for the sport of softball, including the United States national softball team. It is a member of the sport's international governing body, the World Baseball Softball Confederation (WBSC). In addition, it oversees more than 150,000 amateur teams nationwide from its headquarters in Oklahoma City.

== History ==
USA Softball was founded in 1933 as the Amateur Softball Association (ASA) with a tournament held in Chicago that was organized by Leo Fischer and Michael J. Pauley. The following year, the 1934 National Recreation Congress recognized the ASA. Shortly afterward, the ASA was located in Newark, New Jersey. A world amateur softball tournament was held by the ASA at Chicago's Soldier Field on September 7, 1939. The ASA relocated to its new headquarters in Oklahoma City on January 1, 1966.

The ASA sponsored the highest level of college softball competition from the disbandment of the Association for Intercollegiate Athletics for Women in 1982 until the NCAA started sanctioning the sport in 1985. The University of South Florida won the National Championship in both years under the ASA.

On June 30, 2016, the Amateur Softball Association of ASA/USA Softball announced that it would be changing its organizational and trade name to "USA Softball", effective on January 1, 2017, along with a new logo.

Since 2005, the organization has run the World Cup of Softball, now known as the USA Softball International Cup. Devon Park also hosts the NCAA Women's College World Series and the Big 12 Conference softball championship.

== Team USA ==
In 1978, the United States Olympic Committee named USA Softball the national governing body of softball in the United States. Due to this designation, USA Softball is responsible for training, equipping, and promoting the six USA softball national teams that compete in events such as the Olympics, Pan American Games, World Championships and other international and domestic events. Softball became an Olympic sport for the first time at the 1996 Summer Olympics in Atlanta. The team won the gold medal and remained in the Olympics until 2008. In the 2020 Olympics held in Tokyo, the USA Softball team returned to play, and placed in second place, winning the silver medal. Team USA has 15 players and 3 replacement players currently on the roster.

USA Softball registers over 120,000 softball teams adding up to about 2 million players. USA Softball is a not-for-profit organization.

== Amateur programs ==
The USA softball youth program began in 1974. Over 80,000 teams, 1.3 million players, and 300,000 coaches participate in USA Softball's youth division on an annual basis.

The USA Softball adult program began in 1934. With over 170,000 teams, 2.5 million players, and 500,000 coaches involved on an annual basis, the adult program is the largest USA Softball program. USA Softball provides programs of competition for adults including fast pitch, slow pitch, and modified pitch for men and women.

== National Softball Hall of Fame and museum ==
The National Softball Hall of Fame was dedicated May 26, 1973, in Oklahoma City. It is located at Devon Park and is open to the public. It has 337 members, including players, managers, umpires, and other suitable individuals.

== Rule book ==
USA Softball publishes an updated rule book for softball each year which is widely used by adult and youth recreational leagues in the United States and abroad. The USA Softball rules were also used for the softball competition when it was an Olympic sport between 1996 and 2008. The most recent Olympics to feature softball, the 2020 Summer Olympics, held in 2021, used the virtually identical WBSC ruleset.
