= Robert J. Casey =

American journalist

Robert Joseph Casey (1890–1962) was a decorated combat veteran and distinguished Chicago-based newspaper correspondent and columnist.

Casey was born March 14, 1890, in Beresford, South Dakota, and attended St. Mary's College in St. Marys, Kansas from 1907 to 1911. Casey enlisted in the Army in 1918 and served at Verdun and Meuse-Argonne as an artilleryman. He earned three citations for bravery in combat before his discharge as a captain in 1919. Casey later wrote (anonymously) The Cannoneers Have Hairy Ears: A Diary of the Front Lines about his wartime experiences, and this book was acclaimed for its gritty and realistic depictions of an American soldier in World War I.

In 1920, Casey joined the Chicago Daily News, where he worked as a columnist and foreign correspondent for twenty-seven years. Casey wrote features, chronicled the Chicago gang wars of the era, and compiled "slice of life" stories, which were published in the paper under column titles "Vest Pocket Anthology," "Such Interesting People," and "More Interesting People."

During the 1920s and 1930s, Casey traveled through Indochina, Cuba, Pitcairn Islands and Easter Island, and many other sites, and wrote about his adventures in newspaper columns and books. In 1940, Casey covered the blitz in London and its aftermath; he was also in Hawaii and the Pacific right after the bombing of Pearl Harbor in December, 1941.

After his coverage of World War II in France, Africa, and the Pacific, Casey came back to Chicago to write. He had been married to Marie Driscoll, who died in 1945; in 1946 Casey married Hazel MacDonald, a reporter and fellow Chicago-based foreign correspondent he first met in 1933. After Casey's retirement from the Daily News in 1947, he continued to write books and freelance newspaper articles. In 1955, he was named Press Veteran of the Year by the Chicago Press Veterans Association.

After being under treatment for several years for a heart condition and high blood pressure, Casey died of a stroke on Dec. 5, 1962 in Evanston, Illinois at the age of 72.

== Works ==
- The Lost Kingdom Of Burgundy (1923)
- The Cannoneers Have Hairy Ears [published anonymously] (1927)
- Four Faces Of Siva (1929)
- Baghdad and points east (1929)
- The Secret Of 37 Hardy Street (1929)
- The Voice Of The Lobster (1930)
- The Secret Of The Bungalow (1930)
- Cambodian Quest (1931)
- Easter Island, Home Of The Scornful Gods (1931)
- News Reel (1932)
- Hot Ice (1933)
- The Third Owl (1934)
- I Can't Forget (1941)
- Torpedo Junction (1942)
- Such Interesting People (1943)
- Battle Below: The War Of The Submarines (1945)
- This Is Where I Came In (1945)
- More Interesting People (1947)
- The Black Hills (1949)
- The Texas Border And Some Borderliners (inc: The Guide) (1950)
- Bob Casey's Grand Slam (1962)
