= H. H. Kohlsaat =

American businessman and newspaper publisher (1853–1924)

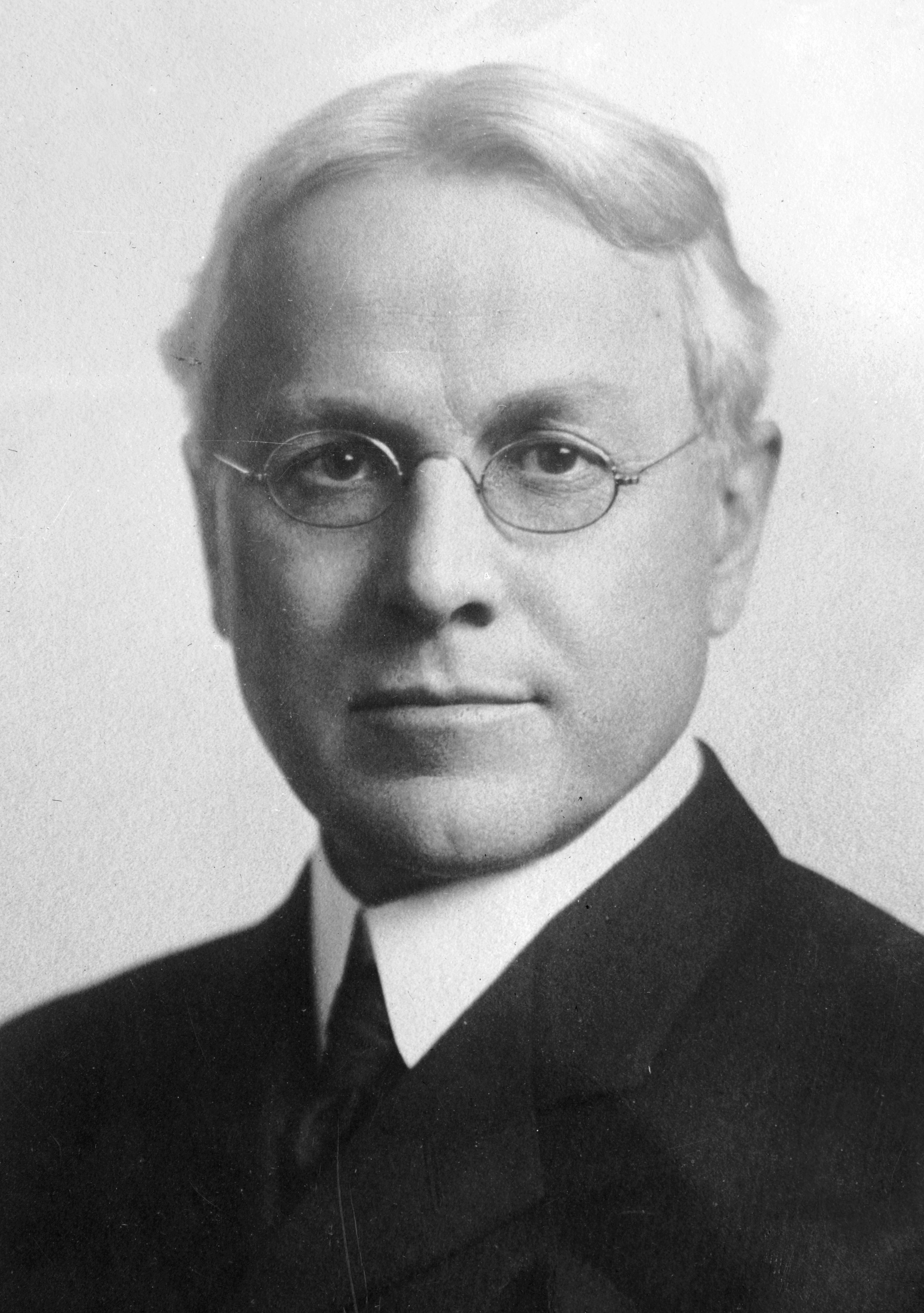
- Born: Herman Henry Kohlsaat; March 22, 1853; Albion, Illinois
- Died: October 17, 1924 (aged 71); District of Columbia, United States
- Relatives: Christian C. Kohlsaat (brother)

Herman Henry Kohlsaat (March 22, 1853 – October 17, 1924) was an American businessman and newspaper publisher.

== Early life ==
Herman Henry Kohlsaat was born March 22, 1853, in Albion, Illinois, one of six children of Reimer and Sarah (Hall) Kohlsaat. His father had been an officer in the Danish Army, and immigrated to the United States, settling in Albion in 1835. Kohlsaat's mother came from England to Illinois with her family in 1821. Reimer and Sarah Kohlsaat were abolitionists whose home was reportedly a station on the Underground Railroad. Kohlsaat's siblings included Christian Cecil Kohlsaat, who later became a well known jurist in Chicago. The year following Herman's birth, the family moved to Galena, Illinois, where he attended school and learned farm work until 1865, when they moved to Chicago. He attended school there for two years and in 1867 went to work as a carrier for the Chicago Tribune newspaper. Kohlsaat later worked for several Chicago merchants, including Carson Pirie Scott and Company. He became a traveling salesman, eventually working for Blake, Shaw and Company, a wholesale bakery owned by Ebenezer Nelson Blake, who was to become Kohlsaat's father-in-law. In 1880, Kohlsaat married Mabel E. Blake (1861–1959) and became a junior partner of Blake, Shaw in charge of a bakery-lunch establishment. In 1883 he bought out Blake, Shaw's interest in the establishment and started H.H. Kohlsaat and Company, which for thirty years was one of the largest baking establishments in Chicago. He became the originator of the "bakery lunch", and subsequently became successful in other enterprises.

== Career ==
From 1891 to 1893, he was part owner of the Chicago Inter Ocean. In 1894 Kohlsaat abandoned his interest in the Inter Ocean, and purchased the Chicago Times Herald and Chicago Evening Post. From 1894 to 1901, he was editor and publisher of the Evening Post and the Times Herald. Under Kohlsaat's direction, the newspapers became increasingly involved in national politics. He converted the papers from Democratic Party to Republican Party organs. In 1901, the Times Herald was merged with the Chicago Record into the Chicago Record Herald, where he was editor from 1910 to 1912. In 1912 he bought the now-bankrupt Inter Ocean and shepherded it through receivership in 1914, when he combined it with the Record Herald, the new paper being known as the Chicago Herald. At that time, Kohlsaat retired from the publishing field.

Kohlsaat was a friend, confidant and advisor of five U.S. presidents: William McKinley, Theodore Roosevelt, William Howard Taft, Woodrow Wilson, and Warren G. Harding. He helped draft the gold standard plank of the Republican Party's 1896 national convention in St. Louis. McKinley's campaign for president against William Jennings Bryan was ultimately won on the gold standard issue, with Kohlsaat one of his strongest allies. Kohlsaat visited McKinley at the White House in 1898. According to one published account, McKinley confided to Kohlsaat that he was having difficulty sleeping over an upcoming decision to go to war with Spain over Cuba. Kohlsaat later related that McKinley broke down in his presence and cried like a "boy of thirteen".

In 1923, Charles Scribner's Sons published Kohlsaat's book From McKinley to Harding: Personal Recollections of Our Presidents. The book, a collection of short anecdotes featuring Kohlsaat's experiences with five presidents, serves as his memoirs. Kohlsaat also wrote several articles for the Saturday Evening Post in 1923 and 1924, including one about Ulysses S. Grant. Kohlsaat had a personal interest in Grant, presumably influenced by his early childhood in Galena. In 1891, Kohlsaat presented Galena with a monument of Grant for the city's Grant Park.

== Personal life and death ==
Kohlsaat had two daughters. Pauline (1882–1956) married Potter Palmer II, son of a successful Chicago businessman; the Children's Home and Aid Society of Illinois gives the Pauline K. Palmer Award for "exceptional commitment and service to children and families". Katherine (1889–1991) married Roger Bulkley Shepard of St. Paul, Minnesota, and had four children: Roger Jr., Blake, Constance, and Stanley. In 2013, the Thomas Irvine Dodge Nature Center became the recipient of Katherine's family homestead in Cottage Grove, Minnesota, which had been in her family for nine decades.

Kohlsaat died on October 17, 1924, in Washington, D.C., while in town to attend the 1924 World Series. He was staying at the home of Herbert Hoover, then Secretary of Commerce. A memorial tablet in the Washington National Cathedral is dedicated to him.
