= Leo Fischer =

Leo H. Fischer (September 20, 1897 – October 1970) was an American sports writer, editor and organizer. He also served on the boards of charitable organizations and headed the National Basketball League in the early 1940s before it merged with another professional organization to become the National Basketball Association that continues to exist today.

== Family life ==
Fischer was born in Chicago. His parents were Abraham and Anna (née Silverberg). From 1921 to 1923, Fischer studied at Northwestern University. He married Margaret MacLean on June 20, 1926. Their children were Barbara (Mrs. William Swisher) and Nancy (Mrs. John W. Gwynne, Jr.).

== Career ==
Fischer was a sports writer for the Chicago Examiner, the Herald Examiner, Chicago Journal, and the Chicago's American. He began his news career as editor of the Great Lakes Bulletin in 1918.

For more than 25 years, he was the sports editor for Chicago's American (from 1943–1969). In 1969, he continued as sports editor when the American was converted into a tabloid known as Chicago Today.

== Other interests ==
In 1933, Fischer co-founded the Amateur Softball Association with Michael J. Pauley He also served as ASA's president until 1938. He wrote a book entitled How to Play Winning Softball in 1940. Fischer was president of the National Basketball League from 1940 to 1944. Moreover, he was a Trustee of the National Hemophilia Foundation and Illinois Masonic Hospital and also served as a director of LaRabida Jackson Park Sanitarium.

== Army ==
Fischer served in the United States Navy from 1917–1919 and after that in the Illinois National Guard from 1919-1920. After that he was in the 1st United States Army Reserve from 1920-1927.

== Awards ==
Fischer was a recipient of the U.S.O. citation for veterans recreational services in 1944. He was cited in the Back of Yards Council in 1953 and named Press Veteran of the Year in 1963. Chicago Sportsman of the Year, 1968. Member of Editorial Assoc., Chgo. Press Club, Baseball Writers’ Assn. Am., Football Writers’s Assn. (pres. 1956), other profl. assns., Am. Legion, Sigma Delta Chi. Mason (Shriner). Elk. Clubs: Variety, Ill. Athletic, Headline (president 1951), Sojourners. Author: Winning Softball, 1941; co-author Little Sports Library (10 vols.), 1939. Contbr. articles nat. mags. Home: Chicago IL
