= Finley Peter Dunne =

American humorist (1867–1936)

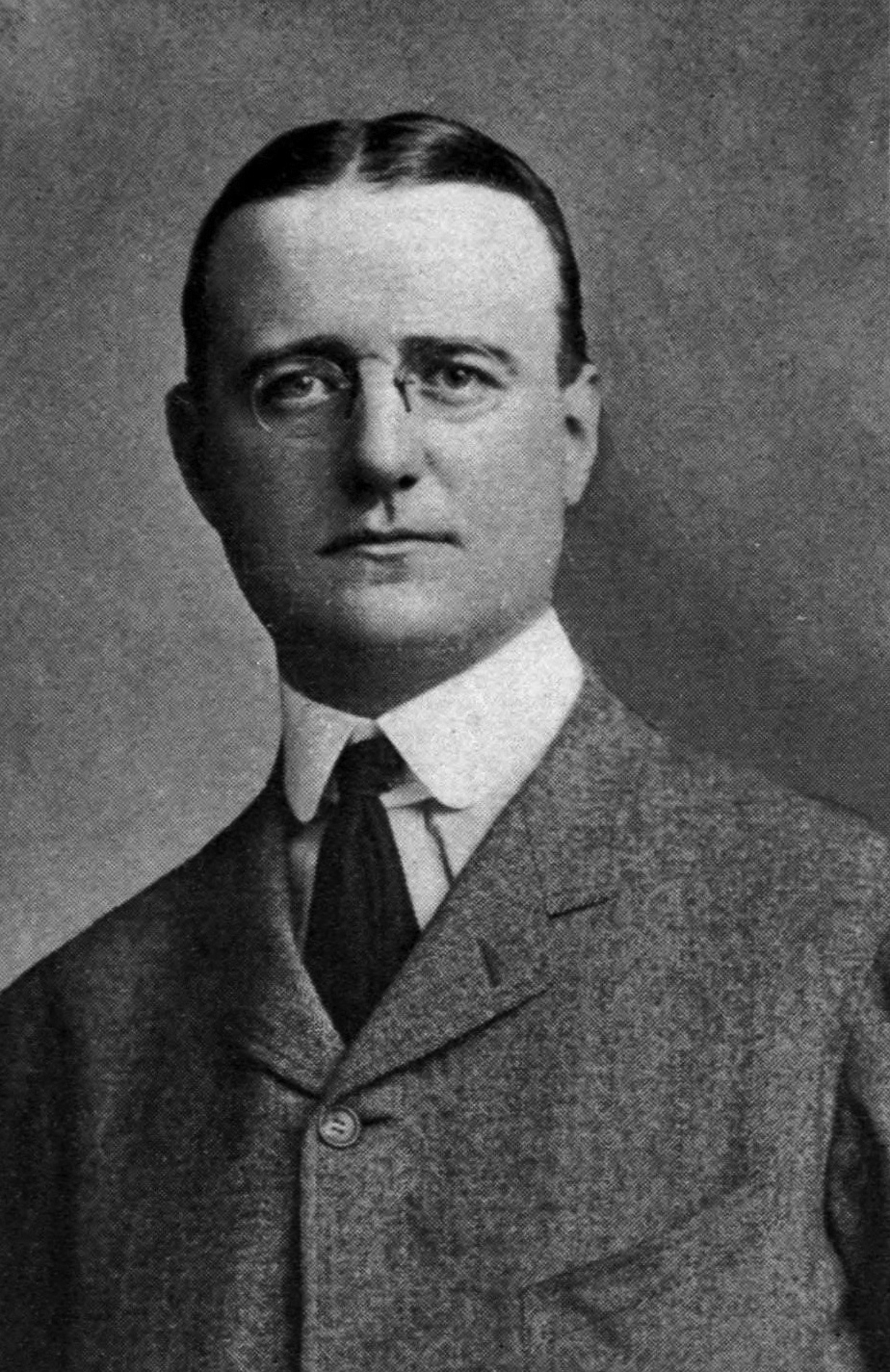
- Born: Peter Dunne; July 10, 1867; Chicago, Illinois, U.S.
- Died: April 24, 1936 (aged 68); New York City, U.S.
- Occupation: Journalist
- Spouse: Margaret Abbott (m. 1902)
- Children: 4, including Philip Dunne

Finley Peter Dunne (born Peter Dunne; July 10, 1867 – April 24, 1936) was an American humorist, journalist and writer from Chicago. In 1898 Dunne published Mr. Dooley in Peace and in War, his first collection of the nationally syndicated Mr. Dooley sketches. Written as though speaking with the thick verbiage and accent of an Irish immigrant from County Roscommon, Dunne's fictional "Mr. Dooley" expounded upon political and social issues of the day from behind the bar of his South Side Chicago Irish pub. Dunne's sly humor and political acumen won the support of President Theodore Roosevelt, a frequent target of Mr. Dooley's barbs. Dunne's sketches became so popular and such a litmus test of public opinion that his newspaper column was read each week at White House cabinet meetings.

Born to Irish immigrant parents and raised in Chicago, Dunne went to work for newspapers as a teenager. In the late 19th century, he and Eugene Field garnered attention for the humorous columns they separately published in the Chicago Daily News. Dunne also continued as a reporter, often covering politics, moving to a series of Chicago papers.

== Childhood and early career ==
Peter Dunne (he later added as his first name Finley, his mother's maiden name) was born in Chicago on July 10, 1867, to Ellen Finley and Peter Dunne, a carpenter, both of whom had been born in Ireland. He was born with his twin brother John, who died in infancy. Peter was the fifth of the seven Dunne children who would survive to adulthood. Ellen Dunne was well-read, and created a bookish environment for her children. The Dunne family had many Catholic priests and one such relative suggested the bright boy be trained as a clergyman, but the elder Peter Dunne refused, saying there would be no children forced to become priests in his family. Recognizing Peter's potential, his parents sent him to high school, the only Dunne boy to attend. His mother had become ill with tuberculosis as young Peter finished grade school and she died while he was at West Division High School. Likely due to his loss, Dunne finished last in his class, though he shone in the school's literary society and as a debater. Dunne had taken the college-track curriculum at West Division, but his poor grades scuttled any such plans. He found a job as office boy at the Chicago Telegram and started work there in 1884, just before his seventeenth birthday.

Through his relatives and as a local boy, Dunne was thoroughly familiar with the local police courts and firehouses. When superiors realized he could write, he was promoted to reporter and sent to cover the police department. His writing talent became clear to newspaper rivals perusing the pages of the Telegram, and Chicago Daily News managing editor Harry Ten Eyck White lured him away in 1885 at an increase in salary. The Telegram barely made ends meet; the Daily News was by far the most successful newspaper in Chicago. Instead of longer editorials, White preferred pithy comments ranging from sentence to paragraph length, and gave Dunne training in this. Some of the elements of Dunne's experience at the Daily News may have resonated in his later Mr. Dooley pieces. Editor White, a humorist of local note and a racing fan, had invented a character, "the horse reporter", who dispensed earthy wisdom to a Chicago newsroom's visitors, and had written a series of sketches about an Irish family living on Archer Avenue, Dooley's future home. Also on the Daily News staff was Eugene Field, a humorist and easily the best-paid journalist in Chicago from the 1880s until his 1895 death. Field's work tended to be noncontroversial, contrasting with the Dooley pieces, but Field's success proved that newspaper humor could pay.

Editor White assigned Dunne to general news reporting and tried to allow him to write special features, which he preferred, disliking the need for legwork in general reporting. Sometime before 1886 Dunne had taken his mother's maiden name as his middle name, and in 1888, reversed the two names, for Finley Peter Dunne.

Dunne's city was at this time baseball-mad over the success of the Chicago White Stockings, and in the spring of 1887, the Daily News started covering baseball games (rather than merely printing the final score). White assigned Dunne. Both at home games and on the road, Dunne sent commentary, usually of the first six innings or so, the most that could be set in type before the six o'clock edition, the final one for the day (the scores from the later innings were punched into the printing plate). According to James DeMuth in his book on Chicago newspaper humorists, Dunne, together with Chicago Herald sports reporter Charles Seymour, "largely shaped the modern forms of American sportswriting". Rather than dry summaries, as had been common to that point, Seymour and Dunne adopted ballplayer slang as technical terms. One term that Dunne is credited with coining is southpaw to describe a left-handed pitcher; in the White Stockings ballpark, a pitcher faced west as he threw to the plate there; thus he threw with the arm on the south side. Dunne was no baseball fan, and saw that many players were well-muscled, but ignorant; this would cause his most famous literary creation, Mr. Dooley, to remark of one young player's career, "fractions drove him from school, and the vagrancy laws drove him to baseball". (Note: To spare the reader's eyes, the Mr. Dooley quotes, for the most part, will be rendered in modern English, and the Irish dialect originals placed in the notes. In the baseball quote it is, "fractions druv him fr'm school, an' th' vagrancy laws druv him to baseball".)

In January 1888, Dunne was hired away from the Daily News by the Chicago Times. That paper had been in decline since the death of its longtime editor, Wilbur F. Storey (Note: A sensationalist well known for his 1875 headline on the hanging of four murderers, "Jerked to Jesus") and new management was seeking to revitalize its staff by raiding other papers. Dunne saw the potential for further advancement in an election year. Historian Charles Fanning deemed Dunne's coverage of the Republican and Democratic national conventions "brilliant" and Times management must have agreed, for they made him city editor, although only aged 21.

== More accomplishments ==
Dunne was city editor for less than a year before leaving for a position at the Chicago Tribune. During that time the Times published a number of pieces containing Irish dialect, although their authorship cannot be ascribed to Dunne with certainty, as they do not bear a byline. It was while holding that position that Dunne had his greatest scoop: breaking the Cronin case. Alexander Sullivan, local head of the Clan-na-Gael, was borrowing funds from it for market speculation, something loudly opposed by a member, Dr. John Patrick Cronin, who subsequently vanished after climbing into a vehicle of men who said his services were needed. Few took much note of the doctor's absence until Dunne learned of the Clan situation, which had escaped press notice. Dunne pushed for an investigation of Cronin's disappearance, and a police detective, Daniel Coughlin, was assigned, who did little work on the incident before announcing there was no evidence of foul play, and continued his indolence once Cronin's badly beaten body was discovered. Dunne became suspicious of the policeman and had him watched. Through contacts, Dunne discovered that Coughlin had hired a horse and buggy matching the description of that which had taken Cronin, and stopped the presses. Coughlin was arrested, but his murder conviction was reversed on appeal, and he was acquitted in a retrial. Despite his journalistic coup, Dunne was forced out at the Times due to a power struggle among the publishers. His next post at the Tribune, as a reporter, was a step down.

About the time Dunne moved to the Tribune, he and other young Chicago journalists formed the Whitechapel Club, named for the locale of the crimes of Jack the Ripper. The club attracted attention for its stunts, including two semi-humorous mayoral campaigns and the midnight cremation of a member who had committed suicide that was well covered in the papers. The club provided the venue for frank political discussions among members who generally were far more progressive than their employers, and the young journalists bluntly critiqued each other's writing. Dunne was one of those who specialized in deflating the self-important, as would Mr. Dooley in the years to come. His biographer, Fanning, found that "the Whitechapel experience was crucial in Dunne's development as a thinker and a writer".

Six months at the Tribune saw Dunne gain promotion to editor of the Sunday edition soon after the start of 1890. This relieved him of the drudgery of the daily reporter's beat, which he disliked. Before the end of the year, he moved again, this time to the Chicago Herald—publisher John R. Walsh and editor James W. Scott were building a staff composed mainly of enthusiastic younger journalists, including Dunne's old colleague from the ballpark, Seymour. Several Whitechapel members were there, as was future politician Brand Whitlock, who later wrote, "when they induced 'Pete' Dunne to come over from the Tribune, the staff seemed complete". Another reason Dunne was willing to jump papers was that he would have the opportunity to do political reporting.

Although hired as a reporter, not an editor, Dunne's experience and competence quickly placed him high on the Herald staff. Dunne got to do political work, covering the 1892 Democratic and Republican conventions. He also had to do work he found less interesting—the young Theodore Dreiser, assigned like Dunne to cover a florists' convention, noted that Dunne seemed to scorn not only the event, but the fact he was assigned to cover it. Despite his affected nonchalance during such assignments, Dunne still turned in brilliant copy.

Dunne was transferred to the Walsh-owned Chicago Evening Post after the 1892 conventions and was put in charge of its editorial page under the paper's editor, Cornelius McAuliff. There, he met his future mother-in-law, Mary Perkins Ives Abbott, who reviewed books for the Evening Post. Another biographer, Ellis, noted that Abbott, a widow who had lived for some years in Calcutta, was the wittiest woman Dunne had ever met and that she recognized his genius. The acquaintance with Abbott, who was a popular dinner guest in Chicago society, launched Dunne into those circles. With those connections and his continued fine writing, Dunne became prominent in Chicago. Assigned by his paper to cover the 1893 World's Columbian Exposition, the city appointed him as its representative at a number of events there that had an Irish connection.

== Dooley origins ==
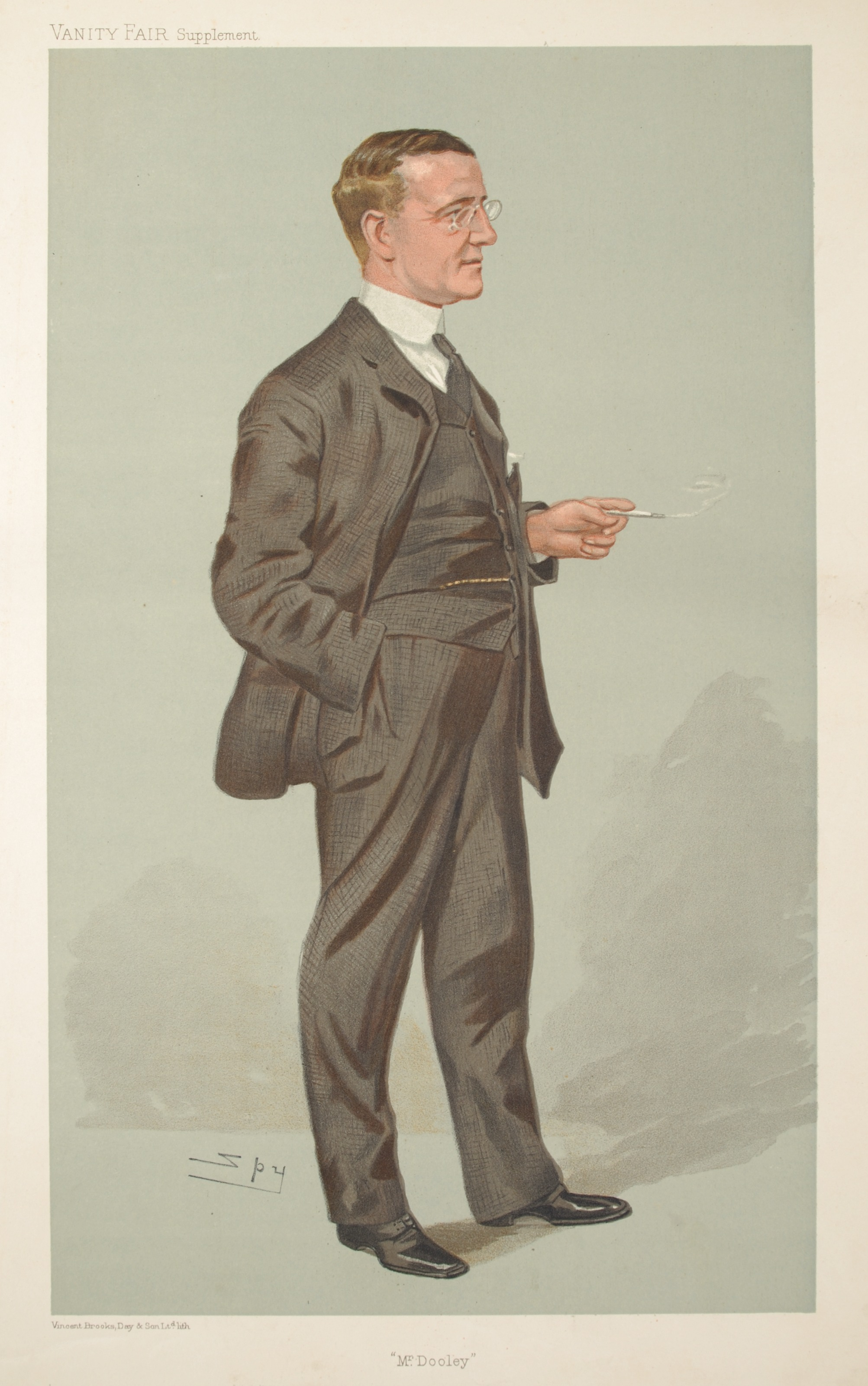
Caricature of Finley Peter Dunne by Leslie Ward, published in Vanity Fair, July 27, 1905

The first Dooley articles appeared when Dunne was chief editorial writer for the Chicago Post, and for a number of years, he wrote the pieces without a byline or initials. They were paid for at the rate of $10 each above his newspaper pay. A contemporary wrote of his Mr. Dooley sketches that "there was no reaching for brilliancy, no attempt at polish. The purpose was simply to amuse. But it was this very ease and informality of the articles that caught the popular fancy. The spontaneity was so genuine; the timeliness was so obvious." In 1898, he wrote a Dooley piece that celebrated the victory of Commodore George Dewey over the Spanish fleet in Manila Bay—and this piece attracted national attention. Within a short time, weekly Dooley essays were syndicated across the country.

In 1899, under the title Mr Dooley in Peace and War, a collection of the pieces was brought out in book form, received rave reviews from the critics. It was on the best seller list for a year. Dunne moved to New York as a full-time writer and national literary figure. Selections from Dooley were read at meetings of the presidential cabinet.

Theodore Roosevelt was a fan, despite the fact that he was one of Dunne's favorite targets. When Roosevelt published his book, The Rough Riders, Dunne wrote a tongue-in-cheek review mocking the war hero with the punchline "if I was him I'd call th' book 'Alone in Cubia'" and the nation roared. Roosevelt wrote to Dunne: "I regret to state that my family and intimate friends are delighted with your review of my book. Now I think you owe me one; and I shall expect that when you next come east you pay me a visit. I have long wanted the chance of making your acquaintance."

The two finally met at the Republican Convention in 1900, where Roosevelt, then governor of New York, gave him a news scoop—he would accept the nomination as vice presidential candidate. In later years, Dunne was a frequent guest for dinner and weekends at the White House.

Dunne wrote more than 700 Dooley pieces, about a third of which were printed in eight books. Their era of influence ended with the start of World War I. After Dooley became popular, Dunne had left Chicago and lived in New York, where he wrote books and articles and edited The American Magazine, Metropolitan Magazine, and Collier's Weekly, becoming a beloved figure in club and literary circles.

Dunne's "Dooley" essays were based on realistic depictions of working-class life, and did not reflect the idealism of most political commentators of the Progressive Era. Fanning says:

Dunne did not share the faith... in progressive reform. He viewed the world as fallen and essentially unimprovable, and many Dooley pieces reflect their author's tendency toward fatalism.

== Personal life ==
On December 10, 1902, Dunne married the daughter of his social mentor Mary Abbott, Margaret Ives Abbott (1878–1955), who, like her mother, was a well-known society woman in Chicago and a prominent golfer. Both were among the competitors in the sport at the 1900 Olympics, Margaret being the event champion (but not the gold medal winner, as those were not awarded at the time). She continued to play golf while she and Dunne were raising their four children, Finley Peter Dunne Jr., screenwriter and director Philip Dunne, and twins Peggy and Leonard.

Dunne died in New York on April 24, 1936.

== Legacy ==
Dunne's historical significance was apparent at the time of his death. Elmer Ellis, historian at (and later president of) the University of Missouri, wrote a biography of Dunne that was published in 1941.

A sports bar in Chicago's Lakeview neighborhood is named after him.

=== Often quoted aphorisms ===
Over the years, he coined numerous political quips. One of the best-known aphorisms he originated is "politics ain't beanbag", referring to the rough side of political campaigns.

As a journalist in the age of "muckraking journalism", Dunne was aware of the power of institutions, including his own. Writing as Dooley, Dunne once wrote the following passage, a parody of the Catholic catechism list of Works of Mercy, mocking hypocrisy and self-importance in the newspapers themselves:

Th newspaper does ivrything f'r us. It runs th' polis foorce an' th' banks, commands th' milishy, controls th' ligislachure, baptizes th' young, marries th' foolish, comforts th' afflicted, afflicts th' comfortable, buries th' dead an' roasts thim aftherward.

The "afflicts the comfortable" expression has been borrowed and altered in many ways over the years:

- Clare Boothe Luce employed a variation of it in a tribute to Eleanor Roosevelt, "Mrs. Roosevelt has done more good deeds on a bigger scale for a longer time than any woman who ever appeared on the public scene. No woman has ever so comforted the distressed — or so distressed the comfortable."
- A version showed up in a line delivered by Gene Kelly in the 1960 film, Inherit the Wind. Kelly (E.K. Hornbeck) says, "Mr. Brady, it is the duty of a newspaper to comfort the afflicted and afflict the comfortable".
- Appalachian political activist and attorney Larry Harless, known best for his numerous attempts to derail funding for Pullman Square often stated that he tried "to comfort the afflicted and afflict the comfortable".
- The American poet Lucille Clifton is quoted often as saying that she aimed in her poetry to "comfort the afflicted and afflict the comfortable".

== Works ==
- Mr. Dooley in Peace and in War (1899)
- Mr. Dooley in the Hearts of His Countrymen (1899)
- Mr. Dooley's Philosophy (1900)
- Mr. Dooley's Opinions (1901)
- Observations by Mr. Dooley (1902)
- Dissertations by Mr. Dooley (1906)
- Mr. Dooley Says (1910)
- Mr. Dooley on Making a Will and Other Necessary Evils (1919)

== See also ==
- George W. Plunkitt

== Sources ==
- Bander, Edward J. (1981). Mr. Dooley & Mr. Dunne: The Literary Life of a Chicago Catholic. Charlottesville VA: The Michie Company. ISBN 978-0-87215-329-5.
- DeMuth, James (1980). Small Town Chicago: The Comic Perspective of Finley Peter Dunne, George Abe, Ring Lardner. Port Washington, New York: Kenikat Press. ISBN 978-0-8046-9252-6.
- DeMuth, James (Summer–Fall 1984). "Hard Times In The Sixth Ward: Mr. Dooley on the Depression of the 1890s". Studies in American Humor. New Series. 3 (2/3): 123–37. JSTOR 42573182.
- Dunne, Finley Peter (1988) [1898]. Green, Paul (ed.). Mr. Dooley in Peace and in War. Urbana IL: University of Illinois Press. ISBN 978-0-252-06040-3.
- Eckley, Grace (1981). Finley Peter Dunne. Twayne's United States Authors Series. Boston: Twayne Publishing. ISBN 978-0-8057-7295-1.
- Ellis, Elmer (1969) [1941]. Mr. Dooley's America: A Life of Finley Peter Dunne. Hamden CT: Archon Books. ISBN 978-0-208-00734-6.
- Fanning, Charles (1978). Finley Peter Dunne and Mr. Dooley. Lexington KY: University Press of Kentucky. ISBN 978-0-8131-1365-4.
- Furnas, J. C. (Autumn 1991). "The True American Sage". The American Scholar. 60 (4): 570–74. JSTOR 41211953.
- Harrison, John M. (September 1967). "Finley Peter Dunne and the Progressive Movement". Journalism & Mass Communication Quarterly. 44 (3): 475–481. doi:10.1177/107769906704400308. S2CID 144614285.
- Madar, Chase (February 2012). "Dooley Noted: Listen to Finley Peter Dunne's Sagacious Irishman". The American Conservative: 7–9.
- Morath, Max (June 2004). "Translating Mister Dooley: A New Examination of the Journalism of Finley Peter Dunne". The Journal of American Culture. 27 (2): 147–156. doi:10.1111/j.1537-4726.2004.00125.x.
- Rees, John O. (1989). "A Reading of Mr. Dooley". Studies in American Humor. New Series 2. 7: 5–31. JSTOR 42573288.
- Schaaf, Barbara C. (1977). Mr.Dooley's Chicago. Garden City, New York: Anchor Press. ISBN 978-0-385-02023-7.
