= Mr. Dooley =

Fictional character created by Finley Peter Dunne

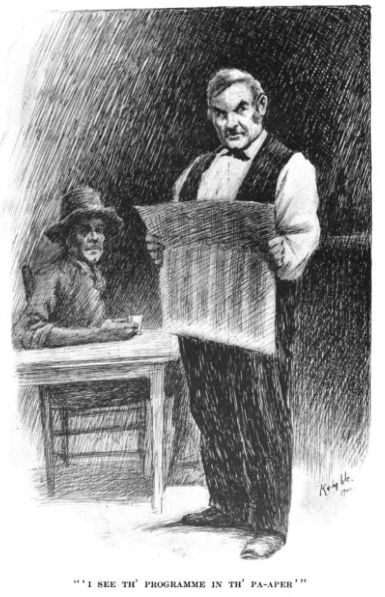
- Dooley (right) and Hennessy, by E. W. Kemble (1900)
- First appearance: "Bridgeport Gossip Shared with John McKenna"; October 7, 1893
- Last appearance: "On the Farmer's Woes"; July 3, 1926
- Created by: Finley Peter Dunne

Mr. Dooley (or Martin J. Dooley) is a fictional Irish immigrant bartender created by American journalist and humorist Finley Peter Dunne. Dooley was the subject of many Dunne columns between 1893 and 1915, and again in 1924 and 1926. Dunne's essays contain the bartender's commentary on various topics (often national or international affairs). They became extremely popular during the 1898 Spanish–American War and remained so afterwards; they are collected in several books. The essays are in the form of conversations in Irish dialect between Mr. Dooley, who in the columns owns a tavern in the Bridgeport area of Chicago, and one of the fictional bar's patrons (in later years, usually Malachi Hennessy) with most of the column a monologue by Dooley. The pieces are not widely remembered, but originated lasting sayings such as "the Supreme Court follows the election returns".

Mr. Dooley was invented by Dunne to replace a similar character whose real-life analogue had objected. By having the garrulous bartender speak in dialect and live in an unfashionable area of Chicago, Dunne gained a freedom of expression he often did not have in standard English. The first four years of the weekly column made Mr. Dooley popular in Chicago, but little noticed elsewhere. Dunne was a rapidly rising newspaperman, and the pieces mainly appeared in the Chicago paper for which he worked. During that time, Dunne detailed the daily life of Bridgeport through Dooley's lips, painting a portrait of ethnic urban life unparalleled in 19th-century American literature.

Dunne's bartender came to wider attention with the wartime columns, and the Dooley pieces were soon in newspapers nationwide. Both the columns and the books collecting them gained national acclaim. Beginning around 1905, Dunne had increasing trouble finding time and inspiration for new columns, and they ended in 1915, except for a brief resurrection in the mid-1920s. Even in Dunne's own time (he died in 1936), his work was becoming obscure in part due to his use of dialect, and the unusual spellings that it required have proved a lasting barrier for potential readers.

== Chronology ==
=== Beginnings ===
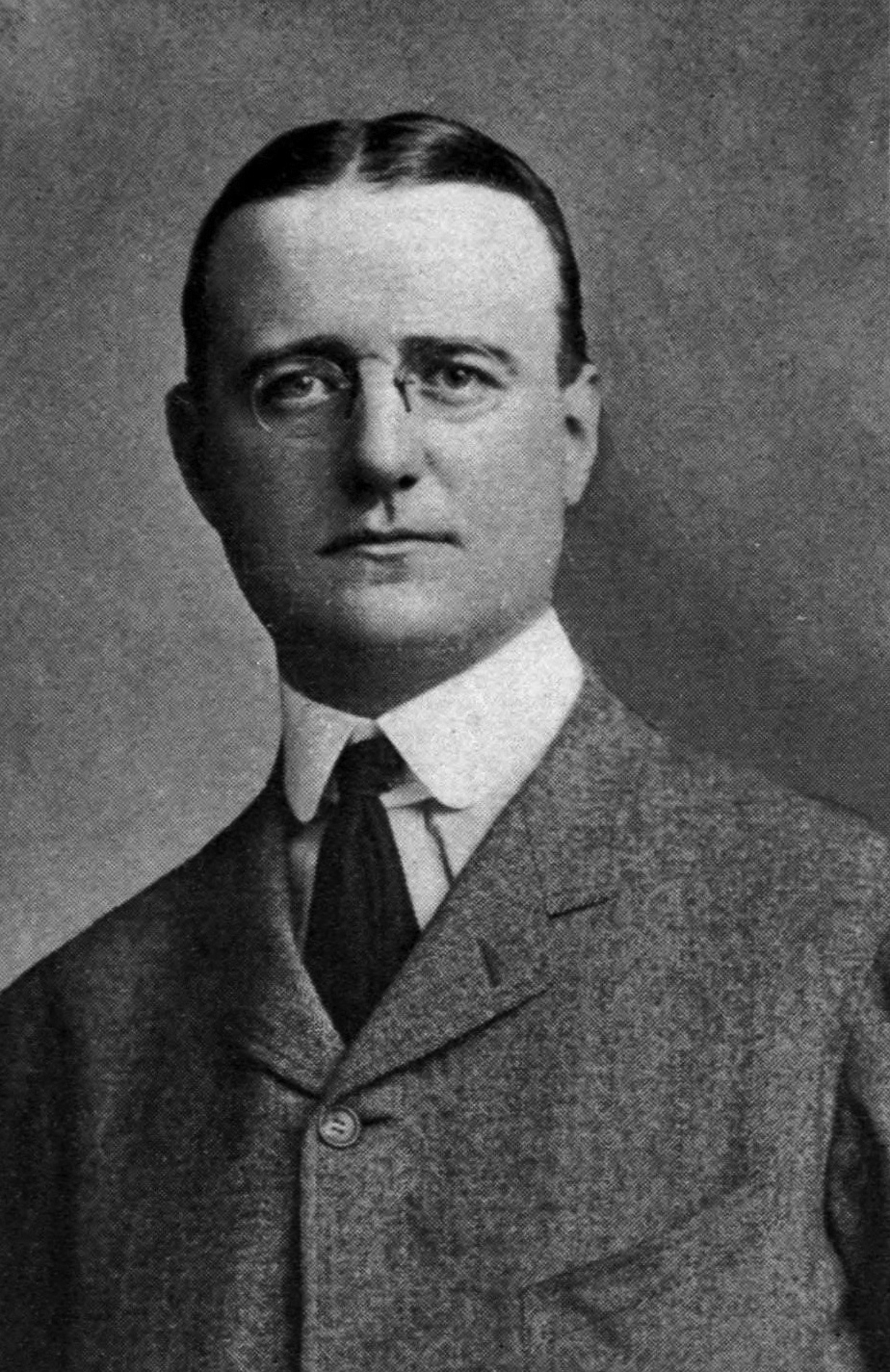
Finley Peter Dunne

Peter Dunne was born on July 10, 1867, in Chicago, the son of Irish immigrants; he added the first name "Finley", his mother's last name at birth, in his early twenties. A precocious boy, he did well in elementary school but finished last in his high school class of 50, possibly because of the death of his mother, and was sent to work at about age 17 in 1884. Dunne got a menial job on the Chicago Tribune, where superiors soon noticed his street smarts, and made him police reporter. Over the next few years, Dunne worked for several Chicago papers, gaining in salary and responsibility, and by 1888 at age 21 was city editor and a political writer for the Chicago Times.

While at the Times, Dunne may have made his first experiments in Irish dialect: an anonymous police reform series published in January 1889. "Officer Quinn and his Friends" features an Irish-American policeman who digs up a suspicious footprint in the snow. Quinn means to take it to the station but is sidetracked at a saloon, emerging several hours later to find the evidence melted. The writer of the Quinn pieces uses unneeded Irishisms, and his spelling is often awkward. When Dunne took a new job with the Tribune later in 1889, the use of Irish dialect in stories followed him; one account of a conversation between two Irish-American members of the city council is rendered as they would have spoken it. He first signed his name to Irish dialect pieces in the second half of 1890, in a series about real-life Colonel Thomas Jefferson Dolan, a small-time Democratic hanger-on. The series, which ended when Dunne left for the Chicago Herald in late 1890, contains elements of the Dooley stories, including mostly being told from a single perspective (an alter ego for Dunne), as well as painting a detailed portrait of the Irish-American scene. By then, Dunne had polished his use of Irish dialect.

The early 1890s saw an increasing use of dialect in Chicago's newspapers, sometimes to mock, but more often to give voice to the immigrant communities that filled Chicago's neighborhoods, and whose worth was being appreciated. By 1892, Dunne, who was still only aged 25, was editorial chairman of the Chicago Evening Post. Its management was marketing (unsuccessfully, as it proved) a smaller-size weekly edition to compete with the large Sunday papers. Cornelius McAuliff, Dunne's editor, asked him to write a humorous piece for each edition of the new periodical. Accordingly, Dunne wrote for the Sunday Post on December 4, 1892, a piece in Irish dialect called "Frank's Visit to Grover", concerning the efforts of former congressman Frank Lawler to gain appointment as Chicago's postmaster, a political plum to be awarded by the new president, Grover Cleveland. Lawler's visit to New York to see Cleveland is described by another Irishman, Alderman Johnny Powers—Cleveland promises the post (Lawler did not in real life receive it) before Lawler and the president-elect settle down to drinking and shooting pool.

In the December 11, 1892 Sunday paper, Dunne wrote another dialect column, this time set in the upscale Dearborn Street saloon of Colonel Malachi McNeary (in all columns but the first spelled McNeery). That barkeeper was based on James McGarry, owner of a saloon near Chicago's newspaper district; Dunne and other journalists would drink there and write their stories. Beginning in the second McNeery column, the listener for his monologues is Johnny McKenna, a real-life figure, who was a Republican in a mostly Democratic Irish community, and who often received government jobs as a token of bipartisanship. The World's Columbian Exposition was the major event of 1893 in Chicago, and McNeery was used as a mouthpiece for Dunne's commentary on the events and sights of the fair. For example, McNeery views a meeting of the fair's Board of Lady Managers, chaired by Bertha Palmer, who in the column proves incapable of stopping an argument between the members.

When the Sunday Post was discontinued because of financial losses, the McNeery columns were moved to the Saturday edition because of their popularity. This local fame came with some annoyance to McNeery's real-life analogue, McGarry, who found himself called McNeery, and even stared at by a Swedish immigrant, a nationality held in disdain by Chicago Irish. One afternoon, when Dunne was in McGarry's tavern, the journalist found him uncommunicative, until his sudden explosion, "You can't put printer's ink on me with impunity," announcing that he intended to see Dunne's publisher, John R. Walsh. According to Grace Eckley in her volume on Dunne's works, the political positions McNeery was made to espouse were contrary to those of some of McGarry's customers, placing him in an uncomfortable position. The following day, Walsh asked Dunne to change the name, but the writer decided this would not be enough if the fictional saloon was kept as is; instead a humbler establishment (and bartender) in some remoter part of Chicago seemed called for. McKenna, unlike McGarry, was enjoying the attention, and, hearing of the problem, took Dunne to his heavily Irish neighborhood of Bridgeport, introducing him to locals there. Moving the venue to Bridgeport had advantages. A "shanty Irish" barkeeper could be permitted greater freedom of expression than McNeery, for to more urbane Chicagoans, Bridgeporters were unsophisticated, humorous hicks. As Dunne later put it, "while it might be dangerous to call an alderman a thief in English no one could sue if a comic Irishman denounced the statesman as a thief". McGarry's heavy brogue featured in McNeery's speech, and was retained in the move to Bridgeport.

Dunne introduced the change in his column on October 7, 1893. McNeery was depicted as having gone home to Ireland, and the bereft McKenna, seeking companionship, enters the Bridgeport saloon of Martin J. Dooley, located on Archer Avenue (to become famous as "Archey Road"), in which he had not been in some years, but where Mr. Dooley greets him as if they had parted the day before. Dooley serves him two drinks and an earful on local affairs—McKenna speaks only two brief sentences, one of which is his greeting. Dunne later stated that at first, he viewed the Dooley pieces as just another weekly feature, done hurriedly in an hour without much attempt at polish.

=== Local man of wisdom (1893–1898) ===
Over the first few months of weekly Mr. Dooley columns, in 1893 and 1894, the character of Dooley began to take shape. The backstory that Dunne gave Dooley began with the future bartender's birth in County Roscommon, Ireland (where McGarry was born), about sixty years previously. Dooley was one of the roughly 2,000,000 Irish people who emigrated to North America during the Great Famine (1845–49), coming across on one of the coffin ships, and later spoke of the hardships and deaths on the journey. Arriving in New York, he tried Pittsburgh and St. Louis, and settled in Chicago in the early 1850s. He worked in the typical occupations available to Irish of the time, as a laborer swinging a pickaxe and then driving horse-drawn wagons; but found these employments not to his liking, as each was dominated by Irishmen from counties other than Roscommon. He remains suspicious of, or even hostile towards, men from certain other counties, with "sheep-stealin' Mayo men" heading the list. Tiring of employed labor, he established a bar on Archer Avenue, spending the Civil War there. His bar became the sort of community tavern around which, together with home and church, Irish life revolved. He interested himself in Democratic Party politics, and after a successful two-year term as a precinct captain between 1873 and 1875, was mentioned for the post of city alderman but was not selected to be a candidate. He remains a bachelor, running his bar which caters to rolling mill workers employed nearby, and dubs himself a "saloonkeeper and Doctor of Philosophy".

Although Mr. Dooley would become famous for his commentary on national affairs, the columns of the first years were generally more local in scope. Through the lips of Dooley, Dunne built a detailed view of Bridgeport, a vibrant community with its own idiosyncrasies and with important local figures. According to historian Charles Fanning, this made Bridgeport "the most solidly realized ethnic neighborhood in nineteenth-century American literature". In the first year, less than half of the columns were political in nature, but this proportion increased as Dunne used Dooley as a weapon for reform of the corrupt city council; according to Dunne's biographer, Elmer Ellis, "over the eight years from 1892 to 1900 there was no single force for improvement more important than the Dooley essays". Dunne depicted Bridgeport as a community whose Irish nature is on the verge of dissolution as other ethnic groups move in, an evolution to which Dooley reacts in various ways ranging from resignation to near-panic.

Commerce from the Columbian Exposition had helped shield Chicago from the gloom of the economic Panic of 1893, which enveloped much of the rest of the nation, but after the exposition closed, the winter of 1893–94 saw much unemployment, suffering and starvation. As Irish immigrants were disproportionately employed as laborers, and had less education than other ethnic groups, Bridgeport was hit especially hard by the depression, and this was reflected in the columns. Dunne's anger especially focused on George Pullman, whose wage cuts for his workers (while not cutting the rents of their houses, which his company owned) helped provoke the Pullman Strike of 1894. In his column of August 25, Dunne wrote,

Mr. Dooley swabbed the bar in a melancholy manner and turned again with the remark, "But what's it all to Pullman? When God quarried his heart a happy man was made. He cares no more for them little matters of life or death than I do for O'Connor's [bar] tab. 'The women and children are dying of hunger,' they say, 'will you not put out your hand to help them?,' they say. 'Ah, what the hell,' says George. 'What the hell', he says. 'James,' he says, 'a bottle of champagne and a piece of cranberry pie. What the hell, what the hell, what the hell'."

"I heard two died yesterday," said Mr. McKenna. "Two women."

"Poor things, poor things. But," said Mr. Dooley, once more swabbing the bar, "what the hell." (Note: For purposes of readability while providing some sense of the dialect, the spelling is changed to that of standard English in most quotes, and the original will be rendered in the notes. In the Pullman article, it is as follows: Mr. Dooley swabbed the bar in a melancholy manner and turned again with the remark, "But what's it all to Pullman? Whin Gawd quarried his heart a happy man was made. He cares no more f'r thim little matthers iv life an' death thin I do f'r O'Connor's tab. 'Th' women an' childhren is dyin' iv hunger,' they says. 'Will ye not put out ye'er hand to help thim?' they says. 'Ah, what th' 'ell,' says George. 'What th' 'ell,' he says. 'James,' he says, 'a bottle iv champagne an' a piece iv crambree pie. What th' 'ell, what th' 'ell, what th' 'ell." "I heard two died yesterday," said Mr. McKenna. "Two women." "Poor things, poor things. But," said Mr. Dooley, once more swabbing the bar, "what th' 'ell." See Schaaf, p. 347)

Dunne brought this column into the Post's composing room to be set in type. When he returned later to check the proof, the typesetters began to drum their sticks on their cases, and then burst into lengthy applause, an experience Dunne described as the most moving of his life.

Mr. Dooley would become known for his humor, which was present in many of the Bridgeport columns, but the Pullman pieces were not the only ones to be serious. One had the drunkard Grady's little girl come shivering to Dooley's door on a winter's night with a can to be filled with beer for her father. Dooley accompanies her home, and tries to beat some decency into the sodden Grady. Another, with Dooley's recollections of a long-ago Christmas in Roscommon, caused Dunne to be brought to tears by his own writing. In another, Dooley joins with Father Kelly, the parish priest, in getting relief for "the man Carey down the street that nobody likes, him being a notorious infidel". (Note: Th' man Carey down th' sthreet that nobody likes, him bein' a natoryous infidel.) Dooley and the priest gather provisions for the atheist, later getting him a job, and endure his speech against the Bible until Kelly cuts him off, "What talk have ye? Go an' starve no more." Although he applauded such acts of individual charity, Dunne through Dooley denigrated charitable organizations, wondering that "a man can square himself with his conscience by giving one thousand dollars to a policeman and telling him to distribute it! Why don't they get the poor up in a cage in Lincoln Park and hand them food on the end of a window pole, if they're afraid they'll bite[?]" (Note: To think that a man can square himsilf with his conscience be givin' wan thousan' dollars to a polisman an' tellin him to disthribute it! Why don't they get th' poor up in a cage in Lincoln Park an' hand thim food on th' ind iv a window pole, if they're afraid they'll bite)

Among the comic themes during the Chicago years was that of courtship and marriage, with much humor made from the supposed aversion of many Irish males to the altar. The local plumber, Dacey, does not fall to matrimony until he enters the wrong city building and comes out with a marriage license rather than one for a dog. The fireman Hannigan's courting of Dolan's daughter is broken off after fifteen years when he is embarrassed by her giving him a wig as a Christmas present to cover his bald head; but for that she would be courted still. With Danny Duggan too shy to propose, Father Kelly acts on his behalf, resulting in "the dear little colleen trembling and crying, but holding on to him like a pair of ice tongs". (Note: Th' dear little colleen thrimblin' an' cryin', but holdin' on to him like a pair iv ice tongs)

By 1895, the Mr. Dooley columns had attracted a large following in Chicago, though because he did not sign them, few knew the name of the author outside the newspaper trade. The two Democratic morning newspapers in Chicago at that time were the Herald, owned by James W. Scott, and the Times, which like the Post was owned by Walsh. In early 1895, Scott bought Walsh's two papers, and merged the Times and Herald. The new Times-Herald promised to be a powerful progressive force, with the Post its afternoon auxiliary; but Scott almost immediately died. Both the Post and the merged paper were bought by H. H. Kohlsaat. One of the main supporters of the campaign of Ohio Governor William McKinley, a Republican, for the presidency, Kohlsaat soon announced a new editorial policy: the papers would be strictly nonpartisan, except that they would be for McKinley, for protectionism (which McKinley supported), "and for anything he wants". The new policy cramped Dunne's style not only in his editorial writing, but in the Mr. Dooley pieces as well. Both major candidates, McKinley and Democrat William Jennings Bryan, were the butts of Mr. Dooley's wit about equally, and the bartender noted with regret the partisan anger that filled the nation. That rancor led to the effective end of McKenna's role in the column, as he (a Silver Republican) differed with McKinley over the gold standard, and as its opponent would not let his name be used in a paper that backed it. The fictional Malachi Hennessy, more typical of Bridgeport than McKenna as a rolling mill worker with a large family (McKenna was a bachelor), became his replacement. Hennessy had first appeared in the column on June 22, 1895, making an ill-fated decision to umpire a baseball game, and had been brought back in June 1896 as a Democrat and a "free silver" supporter, a foil to McKenna, who was depicted as backing the gold standard. McKenna regretted his decision, but was infrequently mentioned thereafter. Hennessy, stolid, patient, and not very bright, was often the butt of Dooley's jokes, but Dunne dedicated his third collection of Dooley stories "To the Hennessys of the world who suffer and are silent."

=== Mr. Dooley in war: sudden fame (1898) ===
During 1897, Dunne sometimes set his sights overseas, discussing Queen Victoria's Diamond Jubilee. Dooley noted that while the sun never set on her domains, the original owners did not get to "set" [sit] there either, "bein' kept movin' be the polis [police]". Late that year, Dunne moved to the Chicago Journal as managing editor and Mr. Dooley began to comment at his new venue in early 1898. Dunne had been limited at his old position by Kohlsaat's insistence that his papers support President McKinley's efforts to settle differences with Spain over Cuba short of war. At the Journal, where the journalism was yellow and shrill appeals for war the norm, Dunne labored under no such inhibitions. He had always turned away praise of the Dooley pieces from those aware of his authorship, wishing to be known as a serious writer. Because of the dialect, the Dooley columns were more difficult for him than writing editorials and columns in plain English. He had ended his last Dooley piece at the Post with the barkeeper bidding farewell, locking the saloon door (as Dunne put it) "perhaps for the last time", possibly meaning that Dooley was done. Dooley had been depicted as in favor of war against Spain in the Post, and Dunne favored military intervention to free Cuba. On February 19, 1898, four days after the USS Maine sank in Havana harbor, Dunne restored Dooley to his arsenal against the Spanish. Fanning wrote of Mr. Dooley's subsequent howls for war: "[A]bandoning his usual stance as a cool and neutral ironist, Mr. Dooley becomes one more loud, irrational voice expressing cruelly simplified hatred of Spain and anger at President McKinley. These new pieces mark the low point in the Dooley canon, for in them Dunne shatters the persona that he has built up so consistently."

By the time war was declared in late April 1898, Mr. Dooley had moderated his position, even if the Journal had not. On April 16, Dunne had Dooley paint a mocking portrait of Fitzhugh Lee, the U.S. consul in Havana whose belligerent reports were fueling the drive to war, in a column printed while the Journal's editorial page was praising Lee. But the real breakthrough was after the Battle of Manila Bay on May 1. That a battle had taken place was known, but as the American commander, Admiral George Dewey, was believed to have severed the cable lines, no word came to the United States, and the nation waited in suspense, fearing defeat. Then, news that Dewey had destroyed the dilapidated Spanish fleet arrived, but the details, and the fate of Dewey and his ships and men, were unknown. Before word came from Dewey that he had not lost a ship or man appeared the May 7 Mr. Dooley piece, "On His Cousin George", that is the admiral, for "Dewey or Dooley, 'tis all th' same". Dooley predicted that "he'll write home and say he's got the islands; and he'll turn them over to the government and go back to his ship, and Mark Hanna'll organize the Philippine Islands Jute and Cider Company, and the revolutionists'll wish they hadn't. That's what'll happen. Mark my word." (Note: he'll write home an' say he's got the islands; an' he'll turrn thim over to th' gover'mint an' go back to his ship, an' Mark Hanna'll organize th' F'lipine Islands Jute an' Cider Comp'ny, an' th' rivolutchinists'll wish they hadn't. That's what'll happen. Mark me warred.)

"On His Cousin George" was an immediate success, reprinted in over 100 newspapers. The columns had not been copyrighted; the Journal quickly acted to protect new essays, and thereafter collected reprint fees. Anecdotes poured in; a recitation of the column had calmed a savage meeting of the Texas Bar Association; another brought down the house at a meeting of California's Bohemian Club; the U.S. ambassador in London, Joseph Choate, read it to an audience of Britons. Mr. Dooley even reached the seats of power; Dunne's June 25, 1898 piece imagining a chaotic meeting of the president's cabinet was read to that body by Treasury Secretary Lyman Gage, a Chicagoan. Dunne struck a chord with his columns as people came to realize how badly bungled were many aspects of the war effort. A repeated target of Dunne's wit was commanding general Nelson A. Miles, noted for having designed his own uniforms, which arrived at the embarkation point in Tampa "mounted on a superb specyal ca-ar", and "his uniforms are coming down in special steel-protected bullion trains from the mine, where they've been kept for a year. He has ordered out the gold reserve for to equip his staff, numbering eight thousand men, many of whom are clubmen; (Note: Members of gentlemen's clubs, that is, the wealthy getting safe positions working for a general, well away from the fighting) and, as soon as he can have his pictures took, he will crush the Spanish with one blow". (Note: his uniforms ar-re comin' down in specyal steel-protected bullyon trains fr'm th' mind, where they've been kept f'r a year. He has ordhered out th' gold resarve f'r to equip his staff, numberin' eight thousan' men, manny iv whom ar-re clubmen; an', as soon as he can have his pitchers took, he will cr-rush th' Spanish with wan blow.) When Miles invaded Puerto Rico in July without much resistance by the Spanish, Mr. Dooley reported on the general's experience of combat: "He has been in great peril from a withering fire of bouquets, and he has met and overpowered some of the most savage orators in Puerto Rico; but, when I last heard of him, he had pitched his tents and ice-cream freezers near the enemy's wall, and was gradually silencing them with proclamations". (Note: He has been in gr-reat purl fr'm a witherin' fire iv bokays, an' he has met an' overpowered some iv th' mos' savage orators in Porther Ricky; but, whin I las' heerd iv him, he had pitched his tents an' ice-cream freezers near the inimy's wall, an' was grajully silencin' thim with proclamations.)

The Journal supported the retention of the Spanish colonies taken during the war, including the Philippines, but Mr. Dooley dissented, anticipating that there would be far more advantage for Americans who would exploit the islands than for the Filipinos whose lot imperialists said they were anxious to improve. "'We can't give you any votes, because we haven't more than enough to go around now, but we'll treat you the way a father should treat his children if we have to break every bone in your bodies. So come to our arms,' says we". (Note: We can't give ye anny votes, because we haven't more thin enough to go round now; but we'll threat ye th' way a father shud threat his childher if we have to break ivry bone in ye'er bodies. So come to our ar-rms,' says we.)

=== Mr. Dooley in peace (1898–1900) ===
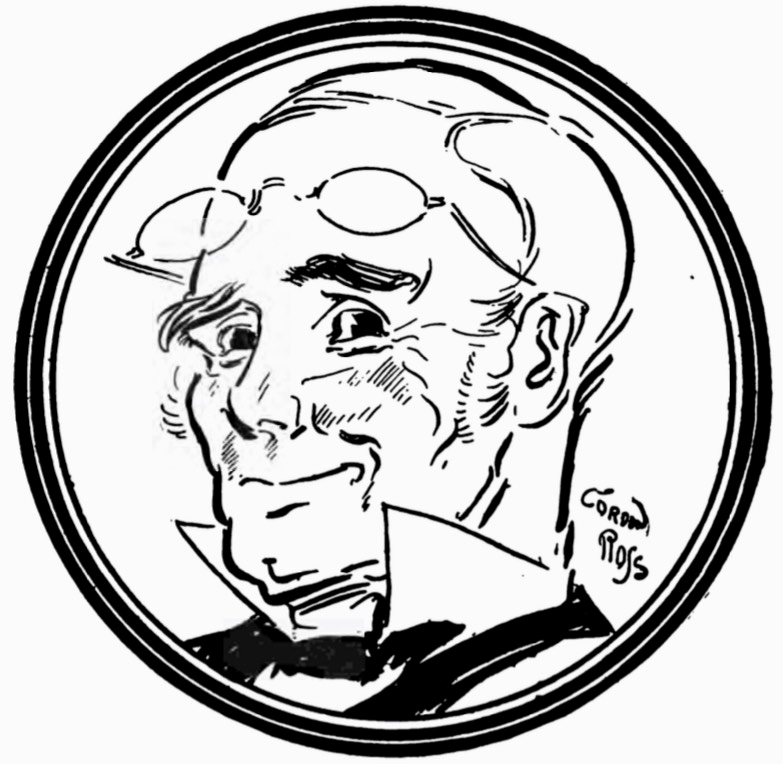
Mr. Dooley, as rendered by Gordon Ross (1909)

Friends had long urged Dunne to collect the Dooley pieces in book form, but he was reluctant, considering them lightweight. With the barkeeper now nationally known, Dunne finally agreed, and Mr. Dooley in Peace and in War appeared in November 1898. The book's preface was signed "F.P.D." the only time he would make even a slight acknowledgement of authorship in the eight Dooley books published in his lifetime, a gesture in vain as he was already becoming well known. It was an immediate bestseller, gaining favorable reviews from the critics. Dunne had selected almost all of the wartime pieces for the second half of the book (in War). At the time, he could not get copies of his columns from before 1895, and may have felt that non-Chicagoans would not appreciate Bridgeport; thus, just 5 of the 31 "peace" essays dealt only with the affairs of that neighborhood. He did include a piece that featured Molly Donahue, the New Woman of the neighborhood, and also a moving tribute to a heroic local fireman. When Dooley reached Britain in 1899, first in pirated editions and then in an official one, the reception was again warm. In June 1899, the Journal wrote:

England doubtless misses a good deal of the humor in Mr. Dunne's dialogue, but she finds enough to make her laugh. And she takes the whole thing more seriously and treats his achievement as a more dignified one than America found it. For America at moments almost forgot the real depth of thought and the political sagacity which lay behind the satire in sheer delight at the excruciating humor of the way in which it was expressed.

Dunne travelled to New York and to London in 1899, taking leave from the Journal. He was treated as a celebrity in both places. Even as he was feted for Mr. Dooley, he privately gave his creation little worth, telling the publisher of the second Dooley collection, Mr. Dooley in the Hearts of His Countrymen (1899) that he was free to make changes, or even exclude one of the pure Bridgeport stories. Dunne had been able to secure copies of most or all of his work, and the second volume contains "The Irishman Abroad", the fifth Dooley piece published; more than half are stories of Bridgeport, including some of Dunne's character studies of its denizens. The volume was well received by critics.

In 1900, Dunne moved to New York. Dooley's musings, since the war, had been entirely on affairs outside Chicago, with no Bridgeport columns, as Dunne needed to satisfy the demands of a national audience. In January 1900, just before he left the Journal, he wrote a Bridgeport piece, in which many of the earlier ones were recalled. This was the last Dooley piece written for a newspaper not to be syndicated; it appeared exclusively in the Journal.

=== National sage (1900–1904) ===
Dunne had hoped that by moving to New York to write full-time, he would be able to greatly expand his output, and he signed to do several projects, including a play featuring Mr. Dooley, and for a series of third-person stories featuring Molly Donahue, Bridgeport's resident suffragist. But Dunne found that he could not increase his production, and that some of the Dooley projects were ill-suited to the character: the play went unwritten and the Molly Donahue stories were abandoned after four pieces. Dooley appears as a character in some of them. Fanning found them unsatisfactory, with a misplaced Dooley, deprived of his bar and control of the dialogue. Dunne was not happy with them either: a note from the author appeared in the Ladies' Home Journal after the fourth piece was published there, alleging ill-health and dissatisfaction with the product.

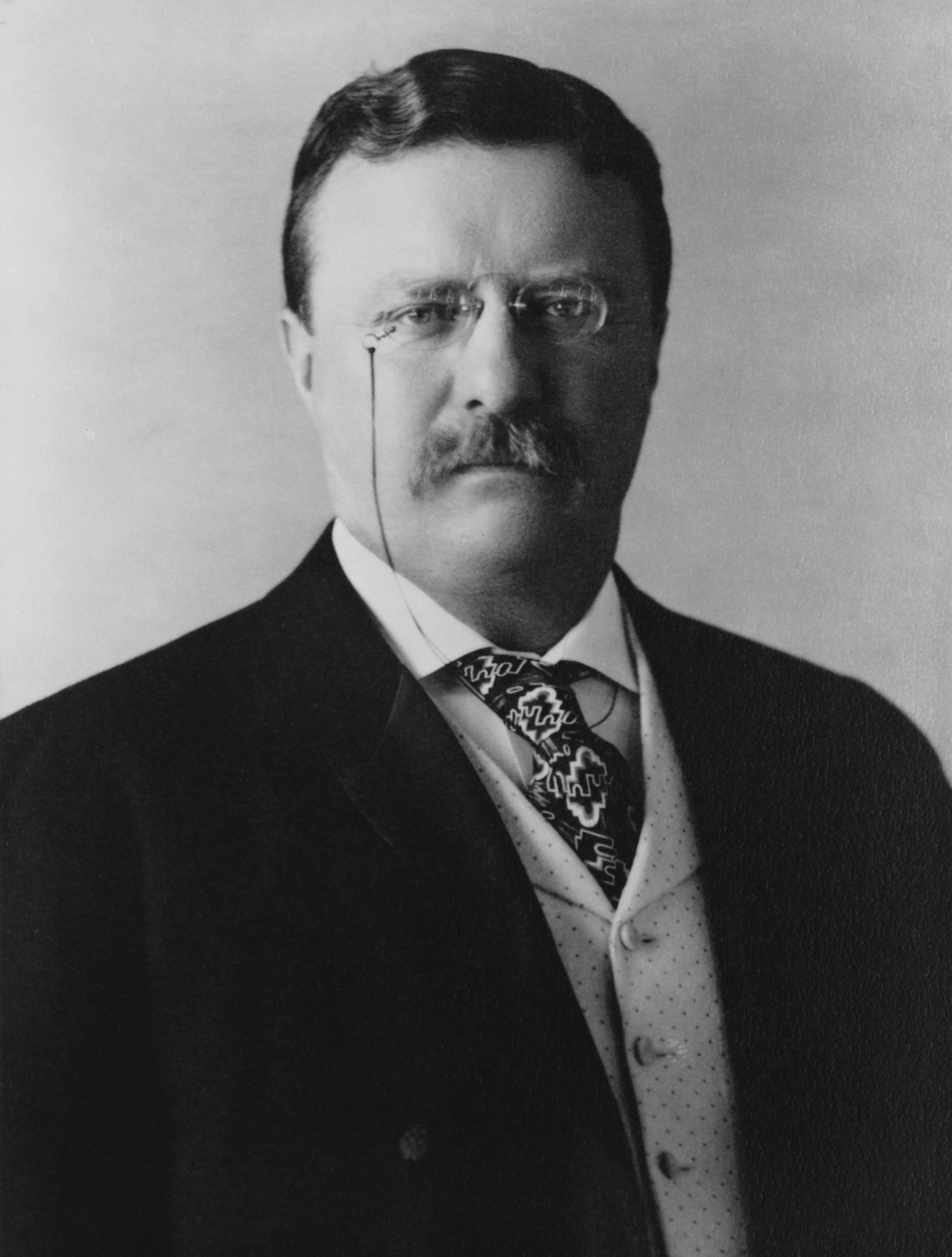
Theodore Roosevelt in 1904

A third Dooley collection, Mr. Dooley's Philosophy, appeared in 1900. The lead story was "A Book Review", that is, Mr. Dooley's discussion of New York Governor Theodore Roosevelt's wartime memoir, The Rough Riders. In Mr. Dooley's version, Roosevelt wins the whole war by himself, a role slightly greater than that in his actual book. Dooley's conclusion: "No man that bears a grudge against himself'll ever be governor of a state. And if Teddy done it all he ought to say so and relieve the suspense. But if I were him I'd call the book Alone in Cuba." (Note: No man that bears a gredge again' himsilf 'll iver be governor iv a state. An' if Tiddy done it all he ought to say so an' relieve th' suspinse. But if I was him I'd call th' book Alone in Cubia.) Somewhat to Dunne's surprise, "Rosenfelt" (as Dooley called him) took the sting in good humor, and when the two met, told Dunne of a young female admirer of his, who told the governor that she had read all of his books, with her favorite Alone in Cuba. Roosevelt was elected vice president on McKinley's ticket in 1900, and when he succeeded after the president was assassinated the following year, Dunne wrote of the new chief executive, the youngest to hold that position, "a man is ... old enough to be president when he becomes president. If he ain't, it'll age him." (Note: a man is ... old enough to be prisidint whin he becomes prisidint. If he ain't, it'll age him.)

Dunne also supported Roosevelt in late 1901 when the president invited Booker T. Washington, an African American, to the White House for a meal—the president's action caused outrage among white Southerners, who overwhelmingly voted for the Democratic Party. Dooley described Washington's visit as "going to be the ruination of President Teddy's chances in the South. Thousands of men who wouldn't have voted for him under any circumstances has now declared that under no circumstances would they now vote for him." (Note: goin' to be th' roonation iv Prisidint Tiddy's chances in th' South. Thousan's iv men who wudden't have voted f'r him undher anny circumstances has declared that undher no circumstances wud they now vote f'r him.)

Another 1901 piece led to one of Mr. Dooley's most famous quotations. A number of lawsuits brought in the wake of the 1898 war dealt with the issue of whether the Constitution applied with full force in the former Spanish colonies annexed by the United States, none of which had been granted an organized government by Congress. This question was known as whether the Constitution follows the flag. In 1901, the United States Supreme Court decided these lawsuits, known as the Insular Cases. The justices' written opinions were difficult to understand, and the court deeply divided, but the net effect was to hold that the Constitution did not follow the flag. The decisions gave Mr. Dooley an opportunity to puncture the court's ivory-tower reputation, "no matter whether the constitution follows the flag or not, the Supreme Court follows the election returns". (Note: no matther whether th' constitution follows th' flag or not, th' Supreme Court follows th' iliction returns.) The phrase has often been quoted, sometimes by people who have never heard of Mr. Dooley.

The year 1902 saw a steady stream of high-quality Dooley pieces written by Dunne, with the barkeeper philosopher commenting on the events of the day, including King Edward's coronation, Arthur Conan Doyle's tales of Sherlock Holmes, and Arctic exploration. But most were on American politics. That Dunne was often a guest of Roosevelt at the White House did not spare the president from being skewered by Dooley, nor was the former Rough Rider's aggressive foreign policy spared. Dunne disliked imperialism, and was outraged by the actions of U.S. forces in the Philippine insurrection against American rule; he satirized Governor William Howard Taft's glowing report on progress there, "We are giving hundreds of these poor benighted heathen the well-known old-fashioned American water cure ... Everywhere, happiness, content, love of the step-mother country, except in places where there are people." (Note: We are givin' hundherds iv these poor benighted haythen th' well-known ol'-fashioned American wather cure ... Ivrywhere happiness, contint, love iv th' shtep-mother counthry, excipt in places where there are people.)

The presidential campaign of 1904, as Roosevelt sought election in his own right, brought Mr. Dooley ample opportunity to comment. The bartender mocked those who wished to be vice presidential candidate on Roosevelt's ticket, alleging that the Republicans "found a man from Wisconsin who was in drink and almost nominated him when his wife came in and dragged him away. They got Senator Fairbanks to accept ... by showing him a picture of our great and noble president trying to jump a horse over a six-foot fence". (Note: found a man from Wisconsin who was in dhrink an' almost nommynated him whin his wife came in and dhragged him away. They got Sinitor Fairbanks to accipt ... be shown' him a pitcher iv our gr-reat and noble prisidint thryin' to jump a horse over a six-foot fence.) The president's enthusiastic campaigning attracted Mr. Dooley's attention: "And when Theodore Roosevelt kisses a baby thousands of mothers in all corners of the land hear the report and the baby knows it's been kissed and bears the honorable scar through life. Twenty years from now the country will be full of young fellows looking as though they'd graduated from a German college." (Note: That is, they would appear to have dueling scars. Dunne's original "An' whin Theydore Rosenfelt kisses a baby thousands iv mothers in all corners iv th' land hear th' report an' th' baby knows its been kissed an' bears th' hon'rable scar through life. Twinty years fr'm now th' counthry will be full iv young fellows lookin' as though they'd grajated fr'm a German college.")

=== Slow decline, apparent ending and brief resurrection (1905–1926) ===
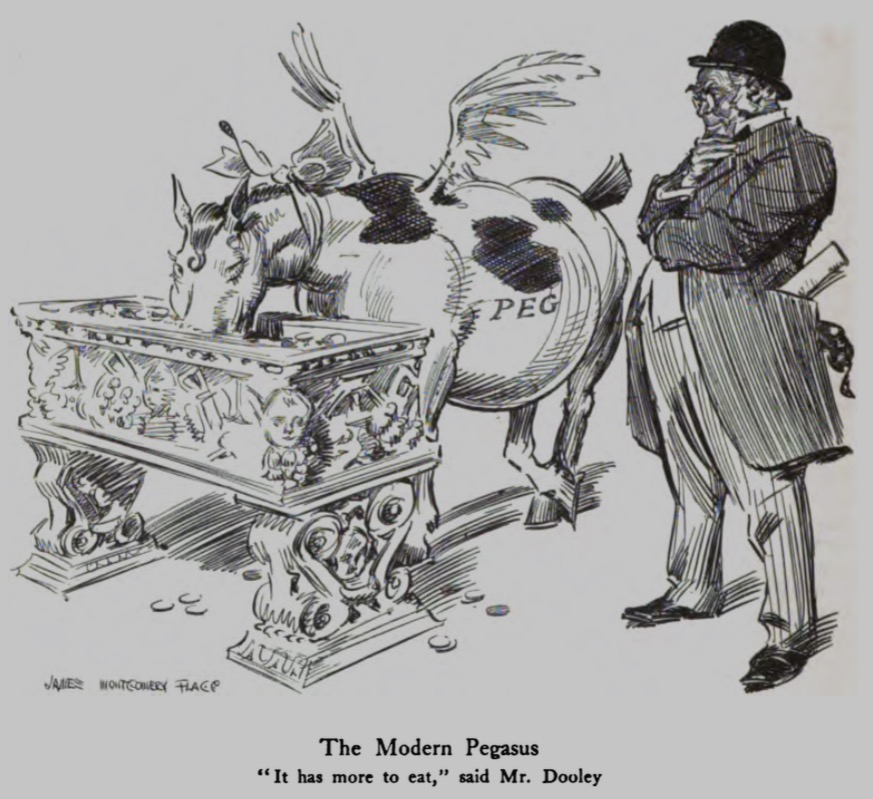
Mr. Dooley viewing "The Modern Pegasus" (James Montgomery Flagg, 1909)

Dunne had never found the actual writing of the Dooley pieces difficult, once he got started—it was finding that initial inspiration, and putting himself in a suitable frame of mind to compose, that he found increasingly hard after 1905. Aware that the columns were reaching an audience of millions and would be reviewed by critics when placed in book form, Dunne was reluctant to release pieces he considered substandard, and defended his position strongly in correspondence with the syndicators. In 1906, he joined with Ida Tarbell and Lincoln Steffens in forming The American Magazine, a project that occupied time and energy, especially since his regular column, "In the Interpreter's House", contained musings like Mr. Dooley's but without brogue or barroom. This allowed Dunne to make his points without tedious dialect. Thus, the Dooley columns continued only irregularly, occupying parts of each year from 1905 to 1915.

When Mr. Dooley could be found behind his bar, his sayings remained at a high standard. Roosevelt remained a target, friend, and White House host, one who took seriously what Mr. Dooley said and corresponded with Dunne about it. In 1906, after the publication of Upton Sinclair's muckraking The Jungle, about the unsanitary horrors of the meatpacking trade, Dooley summed up the objections of the packers to the book, "if they had a blind man in the Health Department, a few competent friends on the Federal Bench, and [corrupt Illinois senator] Farmer Bill Lorimer to protect the cattle interests of the Great West, they cared not who made the novels of our country." (Note: If they had a blind man in th' Health Departmint, a few competint frinds on th' Fedhral Bench, an' Farmer Bill Lorimer to protect th' cattle inthrests iv th' Great West, they cared not who made th' novels iv our counthry.) In June 1907, Dooley and Hennessy speculated as to what Roosevelt would do when his term expired in 1909. Dooley stated that were he an ex-president, the publican would try to do something really hard and likely to take up the remainder of his days, "I'd thry to be President again".

None of the columns after Dunne joined The American Magazine attracted the attention the earlier ones had, but Mr. Dooley continued to comment on the issues of the day. Andrew Carnegie was a repeated target, as was John D. Rockefeller, whom Dooley summed up with "he never done anything wrong, save in the way of business" (Note: He niver done annythin' wrong, save in th' way iv business.) In 1909, during the debates over the Payne–Aldrich Tariff, Dunne examined the bill and came out of it with an exotic item called "divvy-divvy", which Mr. Dooley allowed, "was let in as a compliment to [Finance Committee chairman] Senator Aldrich. It's his motto." A seventh Dooley book was published in 1910, but given disappointing sales, the publishers abandoned plans for another in 1911. Although Dunne was a strong supporter of Roosevelt in the contentious 1912 presidential election, Mr. Dooley retained his customary above-the-fray attitude, mocking Roosevelt's excited oratory with Dooley feeling there was a large fire somewhere, a mystery solved when he opens the newspaper and learns "much to my relief, that it was not my pants but the Republic that was on fire". (Note: much to me relief, found it was not me pants but th' republic that was on fire.)

Sickened by the carnage of World War I, and by the growing suspicion and intolerance with which Americans regarded each other, Dunne ended the Dooley series in 1915. The last of the original series of Mr. Dooley was "On Going to See the Doctor", which appeared in the February 1915 Hearst's magazine. Mourned critic Gilbert Seldes, "We needed him badly during the war". Dunne was by then editor of Collier's, but was left unemployed, though with a financial cushion, when the magazine was sold in 1919. He was urged by many to resurrect the Dooley series, but was reluctant, as the publication of the eighth Dooley collection that year, Mr. Dooley on Making a Will and Other Necessary Evils gained only lukewarm sales and reviews; Francis Hackett of The New Republic accused Dunne of "scor[ing] hard and often—on a newspaper target".

It was not until 1922 that Dunne, driven by financial need, began to work on Dooley again, first by shortening old columns for re-syndication, and then, during the 1924 presidential campaign, writing new ones for the newspapers, with Mr. Dooley's tavern transformed by Prohibition into a speakeasy. Beginning early in the year, these appeared on a weekly basis but ended in the final days of the campaign, and conflict with the syndicator when Dunne was unable to produce expected columns put an end to original Mr. Dooley in newspapers. Although prominently featured, these new columns did not generate a great deal of interest. Nevertheless, Dunne was encouraged enough to agree, in 1926, to do a regular Dooley piece for the weekly Liberty magazine. These appeared regularly for six months, and then Dunne ended the arrangement. Ellis speculated that Dunne may no longer have been in financial need, or knew that the pieces were not up to the standards he had earlier set. Dunne's friendship with some of the figures associated with the scandals of the Harding administration, such as Harry Daugherty and Edward Doheny, made it difficult for Mr. Dooley to keep up his pose of disinterested outsider, and Dunne indirectly defended Daugherty in one piece. Dunne's last Mr. Dooley column was "On the Farmer's Woes", appearing in the July 3, 1926 issue.

Soon after the series with Liberty ended, Dunne received a large bequest from his friend Payne Whitney, relieving him of the need to work. Thereafter, Dunne gave up professional writing, with the exception of an infrequent guest editorial or column, and did not write any more Dooley pieces; he died in 1936.

== Language and technique ==
"I've come", says General Miles, "to pay my respects to the head of the nation." "Thank you", says the president, "I'll do the same for the head of the army", he says, bouncing a coal scuttle on the veteran's helmet. "General, I don't like your recent conduct", he says, sending the right to the point of the jaw. "You've been in the army forty years", he says, pushing his head into the grate, "and you should know that an officer who criticizes his fellow officers, save in the regular way, that is to say in a round robin, is guilty of I don't know what", he says, feeding him with his sword ... (Note: 'I've come,' says Gin'ral Miles, 'to pay me rayspicts to th' head iv th' naytion.' 'Thank ye,' says th' prisidint, ' I'll do th' same f'r th' head iv th' army,' he says, bouncin' a coal scuttle on th' vethran's helmet. 'Gin'ral, I don't like ye'er recent conduct,' he says, sindin' th' right to th' pint iv th' jaw. 'Ye've been in th' army forty year,' he says, pushin' his head into th' grate, 'an' ye shud know that an officer who criticizes his fellow officers, save in th' reg'lar way, that is to say in a round robin, is guilty iv I dinnaw what,' he says, feedin' him with his soord. ...)

— Mr. Dooley on Roosevelt's rebuke to General Miles for criticizing the verdict in the Schley–Sampson controversy

Over 500 columns and thirty years, Dunne's use of Irish dialect remained fairly consistent. He avoided stereotypically Irish words like begorrah. Among the vowel shifts Dunne used is that from ē (as in the first vowel sound in "easily") to ā (thus, it becomes "aisily"). The word "my" becomes "me" in the mouth of Dooley, and "by" becomes "be", but these are more grammatical distortions than vowel shifts. The letter "y" is often used to begin constructions beginning with multiple vowels, like "-ious" and "-iate", thus they become "-yus" (gloryus) and "-yate" (humilyate) and when added next to consonants or diphthongs can distort the word in a way confusing to the reader (villain becomes villyan; giant becomes joynt). Some of the puns that Dunne made transcend language barriers, as when Dooley renders Émile Zola's famous admonition in the Dreyfus case, J'Accuse…! (I Accuse!), as "jackuse" (jackass). Pronouncing it at Dreyfus's trial gets Zola "thrun ... out" for "a hell of a mane thing to say to anny man".

The authenticity of Dunne's use of dialect was controversial even in his own lifetime. Dunne's partisans claimed that it was genuine Roscommon dialect, phonetically transcribed. But Dunne never called it such, making it clear in the columns that Mr. Dooley had been in America for many years, and so his dialect would have been modified by decades of exposure to an Archey Road wherein was known every way of speaking heard from Armagh to Bantry Bay, and more besides. Dunne was not always consistent in his usages, and spells Dooley's favorite subject, "polytics", "polliticks", "pollytics" and correctly. According to Ellis, while Dunne was no philologist, he had a good ear, and the biographer considered the Dooley pieces the outstanding use of Irish-American dialect in written form. Paul Green, though, in his introduction to the 1988 edition of Mr. Dooley in Peace and in War, averred that scholars in Ireland have stated that Dunne did not capture the dialect, and have written that the Dooley pieces were not popular there. According to Dunne's son Philip, except in a few of the early pieces, Dooley "spoke always as an American, dealing with American and world issues. Eliminate the brogue and the pieces stand out as what they were: pure Americana."

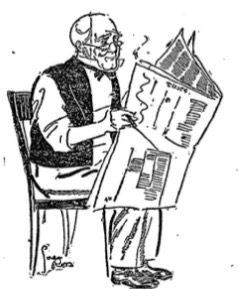
Mr. Dooley reads his "pa-apers" (by Gordon Ross, 1907)

Scholars have differed on the issue of what is to be made of Mr. Dooley and the often bizarre things Dunne placed in his mouth: whether Dooley is intended to believe that he is a cousin of Admiral Dewey, or that "Mack" (as he calls President McKinley) has actually said the seemingly unlikely things that the barkeeper relates. Walter Blair, in his 1942 volume on American humor, considered Mr. Dooley too much of a provincial innocent to grasp that referring to the president so familiarly might be a solecism. Many Dooley pieces commence "I see by the papers", that is, the newspapers Dooley subscribes to for his customers to read and which the bartender peruses at slack times, constituting a major source of information for him. Blair contended that Dooley knows only what he reads in the Evening Post and other papers, and gullibly believes quotations he has heard without attribution from his customer Hogan were made up by that bookish patron. Dunne wrote in 1898 that Dooley "reads the newspapers with solemn care, heartily hates them, and accepts all they print for the sake of drowning Hennessy's rising protests against his logic".

Norris Yates, in his The American Humorist (1964), argued that Dooley is entirely reliant on the papers for information, and has understood them badly. He wrote that Mr. Dooley is intended to be the opposite of the well-informed citizen sought by the Progressive Movement, and that his comments contain more truth than he knows. John O. Rees, in his journal article on Mr. Dooley, suggested that the barkeeper is intended to act in full awareness of how fantastic his words can be; he is expanding on what he has seen in the papers, turning it into a pointed story for the entertainment and edification of Hennessy, and himself. Dooley's apparent misrenderings of the literary quotations Hogan has supposedly regaled him with are, most frequently, too pointed to be mere muddling from the uneducated mind, for example alluding to Gray's Elegy in stating, while discussing high-society gossip, "No one wants to hear what Hogan calls, 'The short and simple scandals of the poor'." (Note: Gray wrote "annals" rather than "scandals". In Dunne's original, "No wan wants to hear what Hogan calls 'Th' short an' simple scandals iv th' poor'.") Although Mr. Dooley claims not to read books, this is not true as he reviews at least two, Roosevelt's tale of his time in Cuba and Sinclair's The Jungle. Occasionally Hennessy is fooled into believing what Dooley has spoken is literally so, forcing the publican to explain to his customer that what he has said was "a joke. I med it up."

== Legacy and remembrance ==
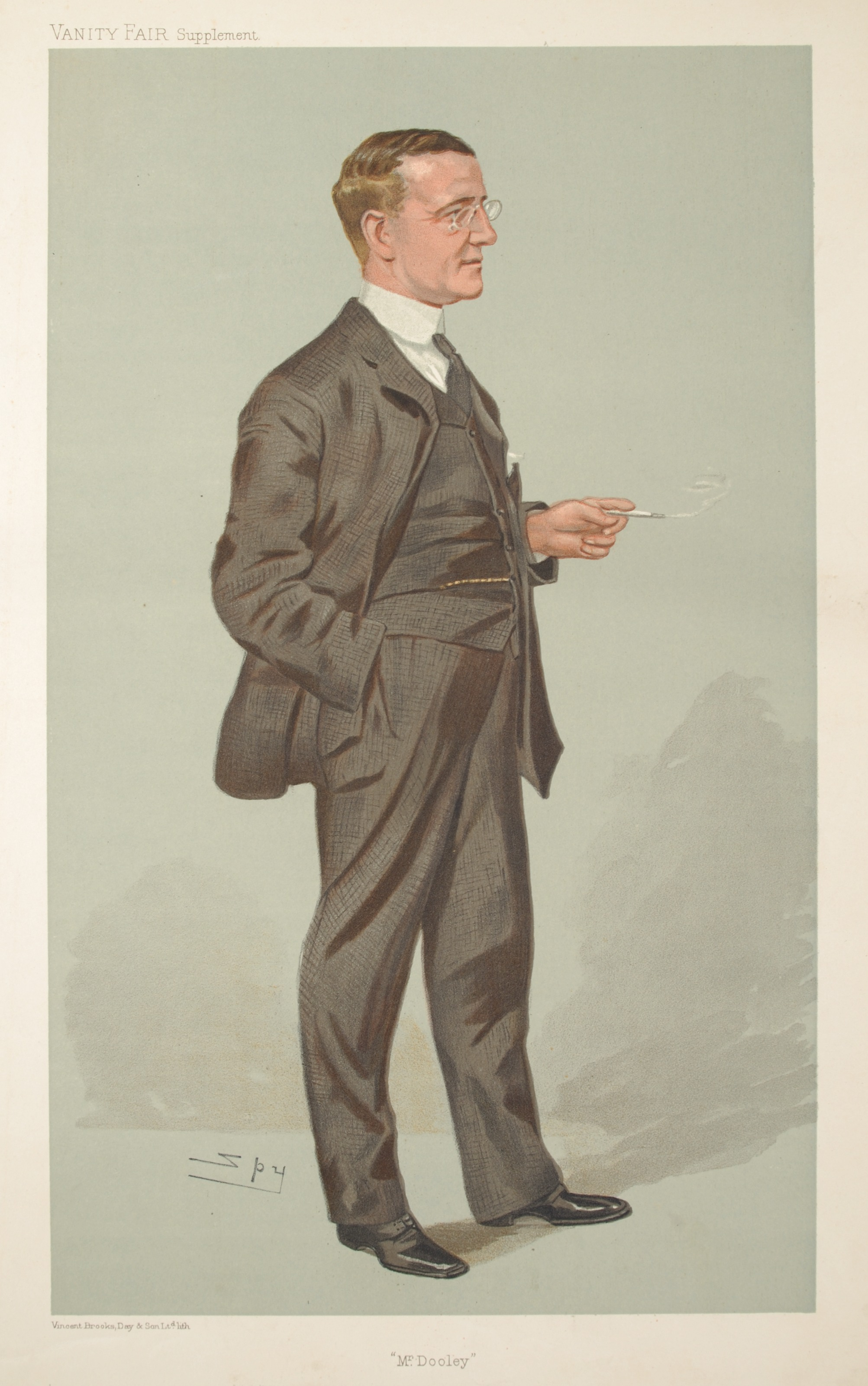
Caricature of Finley Peter Dunne by Leslie Ward, published in Vanity Fair, July 27, 1905

For Dunne, the Dooley pieces were a burden, but one that brought him fame and money, neither of which was enough to keep him at his desk once he gained the Whitney legacy. Before he died in 1936, Dunne knew that interest in the Dooley pieces was fading, which saddened him. Understanding that readers were having trouble with the Irish dialect, he experimented with translating the columns into ordinary English, but published none in that form. In 1938, The New Republic noted in an article, "if you try quoting Mr. Dooley's brogue to the average listener you will be rewarded with a look of intense pain. But if you translate Mr. Dooley into ordinary English nearly everything precipitates out as pure wisdom." Ellis, writing in 1941, argued, "that the Dooley essays are journalism of the finest type few will dispute; that they are literature in the more permanent sense may not be so clear. Were the American-Irish brogue of Mr. Dooley still a living and growing language there might be no doubt about it, but Mr. Dooley's language has become at least obsolescent, and that puts the future of the Dooley essay in serious question." Ellis noted that attempts to imitate Dunne's success with other Irish-dialect columns failed, and suggested the brogue was not essential to the originals' popularity, "Dunne's essays lose nothing today when translated into ordinary English words".

Author J. C. Furnas regretted that "a Presidential year always makes Dooleyites feel frustrated. In 1960 we need Mr. Dooley to deal adequately with such things as public-opinion polls; Mr. Truman's opinion of primaries; the spring swarming of the Kennedys in Minnesota; [and] the problem [of] whether Mr. Nixon should invite Checkers back into the act". Writing again in 1991, Furnas suggested potential Dooley targets might include the Bork and Souter confirmation hearings, and the omnipresence of blue jeans; but that an impediment to a revival of interest in Dooley was the present-day view of dialect works as demeaning. English professor John W. Lowe stated that Dooley "set the model for an ethnic spokesman who could be entertaining and informative at the same time using humor to mask a subversive form of humor and get a message across. Then, the Irish made it, and they found his brogue and dialect embarrassing."

Historian Richard Hofstadter deemed Dunne through Dooley "one of [the Progressive Era's] shrewdest commentators". Louis Filler wrote in 1954 that "any lively mention of the Progressive Era is bound to evoke recollections of Dooley, usually in the form of one of his aphorisms". Dunne is closely associated with that era, and worked with several of the muckrakers during the first decade of the 20th century. Scholars have not agreed on the extent to which Dunne through Dooley influenced the era: Ellis believed that the Dooley columns paved the way for public acceptance of the realistic writing of the muckrakers, but Filler disagreed, noting that Dunne's was one of many voices calling for reform in the 1890s. Journalism professor John M. Harrison argued that though Dunne's progressivism, of a non-Marxist sort, placed him at odds with others who urged change, "he was as effective as any writer of his time in keeping before the public mind those issues and questions that were the moving forces in the Progressive movement".

According to Chase Madar in his 2012 article on Dooley, "though Mr. Dooley has been nearly forgotten since the 1930s, in his prime he was the subject of comic strips and pop songs and quoted widely by presidents and Parliaments". As well as the adage about the Supreme Court following the election returns, other Dooleyisms that survived Dunne's time include "politics ain't bean-bag" (Note: That is, that the game of politics is played seriously. Similarly one might say it is played with live ammunition, and for keeps.) and that a purpose of newspapers was to "comfort the afflicted and afflict the comfortable". (Note: The quotation:"Th' newspaper does ivrything f'r us. It runs th' polis foorce an' th' banks, commands th' milishy, controls th' ligislachure, baptizes th' young, marries th' foolish, comforts th' afflicted, afflicts th' comfortable, buries th' dead an' roasts thim aftherward. They ain't annything it don't turn its hand to fr'm explainin' th' docthrine iv thransubstantiation to composin' saleratus biskit." Finley Peter Dunne (1906). "Newspaper Publicity". Observations by Mr. Dooley. Harper & Bros. p. 240. ISBN 978-1-4655-0150-9.) In July 2016, Kevin D. Williamson used "politics ain't beanbag" (as he put it) to excuse the failure of unsuccessful contenders for the Republican presidential nomination to fulfill their promises and endorse the winner, Donald Trump.

Contrasting with Dooley's present obscurity is the fame of Dunne's friend Mark Twain. Furnas argued that Dooley was read and accepted by a far wider audience in his time than was Twain, thus rousing "the suspicion that as between the two, Dunne better fitted the notion of a national humorist". Fanning wrote, "Dunne's expansion of the literary uses of the vernacular dialect voice is comparable, though on a smaller scale, to Mark Twain's decision to let Huck Finn tell his own story." According to author and entertainer Max Morath:

Dunne/Dooley is a missing link in the evolution of American critical thought. The essays were read on an almost weekly basis by millions of Americans during the Progressive Era, the age of Theodore Roosevelt and William Jennings Bryan, Thomas Edison and J. P. Morgan. The Frontier was gone; it was a time, we are told, of jingoism and greed, but also of excitement and hope ... We need Finley Peter Dunne for continuity. We need to know that this precocious son of Irish immigrants—those despised bottom-rung unwashed of mid-nineteenth century—somehow developed a voice that was unique and strong, that was heard, that may well have influenced at its outset the very course of the twentieth—the "American"—century.

== Books ==
- Mr. Dooley in Peace and in War (1898)
- Mr. Dooley in the Hearts of His Countrymen (1899)
- Mr. Dooley's Philosophy (1900)
- Mr. Dooley's Opinions (1901)
- Observations by Mr. Dooley (1902)
- Dissertations by Mr. Dooley (1906)
- Mr. Dooley Says (1910)
- Mr. Dooley on Making a Will and Other Necessary Evils (1919)

== Sources ==
- Bander, Edward J. (1981). Mr. Dooley & Mr. Dunne: The Literary Life of a Chicago Catholic. Charlottesville VA: The Michie Company. ISBN 978-0-87215-329-5.
- De Muth, James (1980). Small Town Chicago: The Comic Perspective of Finley Peter Dunne, George Ade, Ring Lardner. Port Washington NY: Kenikat Press. ISBN 978-0-8046-9252-6.
- De Muth, James (Summer–Fall 1984). "Hard Times In The Sixth Ward: Mr. Dooley on the Depression of the 1890s". Studies in American Humor. New Series. 3 (2/3): 123–37. JSTOR 42573182.
- Dunne, Finley Peter (1988) [1898]. Green, Paul (ed.). Mr. Dooley in Peace and in War. Urbana IL: University of Illinois Press. ISBN 978-0-252-06040-3.
- Eckley, Grace (1981). Finley Peter Dunne. Twayne's United States Authors Series. Boston: Twayne Publishing. ISBN 978-0-8057-7295-1.
- Ellis, Elmer (1969) [1941]. Mr. Dooley's America: A Life of Finley Peter Dunne. Hamden CT: Archon Books. ISBN 978-0-208-00734-6.
- Fanning, Charles (1978). Finley Peter Dunne and Mr. Dooley. Lexington KY: University Press of Kentucky. ISBN 978-0-8131-1365-4.
- Furnas, J. C. (Autumn 1991). "The True American Sage". The American Scholar. 60 (4): 570–74. JSTOR 41211953.
- Harrison, John M. (September 1967). "Finley Peter Dunne and the Progressive Movement". Journalism & Mass Communication Quarterly. 44 (3): 475–481. doi:10.1177/107769906704400308. S2CID 144614285.
- Madar, Chase (February 2012). "Dooley Noted: Listen to Finley Peter Dunne's Sagacious Irishman". The American Conservative: 7–9.
- Morath, Max (June 2004). "Translating Mister Dooley: A New Examination of the Journalism of Finley Peter Dunne". The Journal of American Culture. 27 (2): 147–156. doi:10.1111/j.1537-4726.2004.00125.x.
- Rees, John O. (1989). "A Reading of Mr. Dooley". Studies in American Humor. New Series 2. 7: 5–31. JSTOR 42573288.
- Schaaf, Barbara C. (1977). Mr. Dooley's Chicago. Garden City NY: Anchor Press. ISBN 978-0-385-02023-7.
