= Samuel Travers Clover =

English-American journalist and author

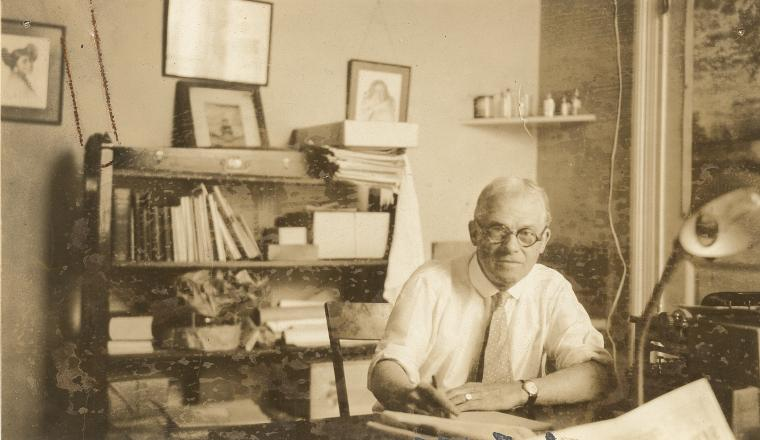
Sam T. Clover in his Los Angeles office. Photo in the New York Public Library archives.

Samuel Travers Clover (August 13, 1859 – May 28, 1934) was a British-American writer, editor and publisher in Chicago and Los Angeles in the late 19th and early 20th centuries.

== Early life ==
Born in Bromley, Middlesex County, southeast of London, England, to John James Clover (a baker) and Esther Greayer, on August 13, 1859. Clover immigrated to the United States in 1869 at the age of 10 with his parents.

== Journalism career ==
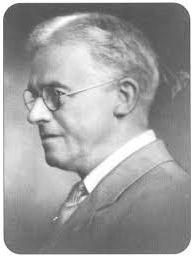
Circa 1927 from the now-defunct Los Angeles Herald-Express

Clover began his journalistic career at the age of 18 on a paper published by the Chicago Board of Trade. Jane Apostol writes of how someone offered him a job at the Chicago Times if he acquired some life experience, so he set off on a round-the-world journey, which he documented in three of his books. She writes that "Clover set out in 1880 with fifty dollars in his pocket, and traveled 40,000 miles in sixteen months. With luck and pluck he made his way to the South Pacific and back, earning money en route as a sailor, a bookmaker's clerk, a circus roustabout, and a circus performer." In Chicago, Clover worked for the Times and other papers. He then spent five years in the Dakota Territory. He was present at the final ghost dance of the Hunkpapa Lakota Chief Sitting Bull, and was said to be the last white person to see him alive. He ran a humorous newspaper and book publishing company in Sioux Falls, Dakota Bell, that he said had a "brief but merry existence." Through it he published a book of verse, Zephyrs from Dakota, but the enterprise ran out of money the same year, 1888, so he sold it. From 1889 to 1893 he served as a correspondent for the Chicago Herald. From 1894 to 1900 he was managing editor of the Chicago Evening Post.

In 1900 Clover and family moved to Los Angeles, where he worked briefly for the Los Angeles Times before taking over editorship of the rival Los Angeles Evening Express. In 1905 he established his own paper, the short-lived Los Angeles Evening News. Clover then took over the Los Angeles Graphic, which he edited from 1908 to 1916. He and his wife Madge ran the Graphic Publicity Company together, beginning in 1912. He also bought the Pasadena Daily News in 1912, but was unable to make it successful. Selling the Graphic in 1916, he moved the family to Richmond, Virginia after purchasing the Richmond Evening Journal, forming a literary club with Orie Latham Hatcher and others at the Woman's Professional Building. The club was occasionally hosted by James Branch Cabell. After its demise in 1920, the family returned to Los Angeles, and he became editor of Los Angeles Saturday Night. In 1924 he took over the long-running weekly magazine, The Argonaut, with staff in both Los Angeles and San Francisco.

== Personal life ==
In 1884 he married journalist, poet, playwright, and literary critic Mabel Hitt, known as Madge. They had two daughters and two sons. Clover collected the writings of one of those sons, Greayer Clover, a First World War aviator who died in France, publishing them as A Stop at Suzanne's: and Lower Flights in 1920.

Clover died at his desk on May 28, 1934, six weeks after the death of his wife on April 16. They had just celebrated their fiftieth wedding anniversary.

== Books ==
- Leaves from a Diary: A Tramp Around the World (Chicago: M. D. Kimball, 1884).
- Paul Travers' Adventures (Chicago: Way & Williams, 1897)
- Zephyrs From Dakota (Dakota Bell Publishing, 1888).
- Glimpses Across the Sea (Evanston, IL: Windiknowe Publishing. Company, 1900).
- On Special Assignment: Being the Further Adventures of Paul Travers; Showing How He Succeeded as a Newspaper Reporter (Boston: Lothrop Publishing Company, 1903).
- "Introduction," A Stop at Suzanne's: and Lower Flights, by Greayer Clover, Samuel's late son (New York: George H. Doran Co., 1920).
- The Mounted Muse and other Cadences (Los Angeles: Saturday Night Publishing Company, 1928).
- A Pioneer Heritage (Los Angeles: Saturday Night Publishing Company, 1932). Based on the life of George Allan Hancock.
- King Hal's Fifth Wife (Los Angeles: Saturday Night Publishing Company, 1933). Historical fiction based on the life of Katharine Howard.
