= Greayer Clover =

American aviator (1897–1918)

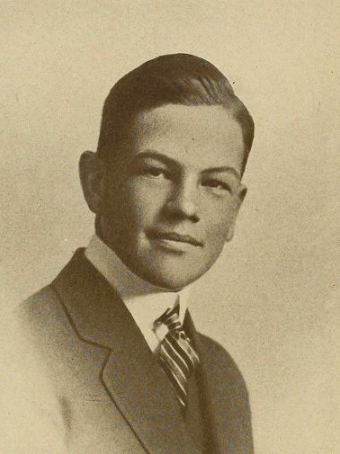
From the Memorial Volume of the American Field Service in France, 1921

Wallace Greayer "Grubby" Clover (April 14, 1897 – August 30, 1918) was an American aviator in the First World War. He was the namesake for Clover Field, the original name of Santa Monica Airport in Santa Monica, California.

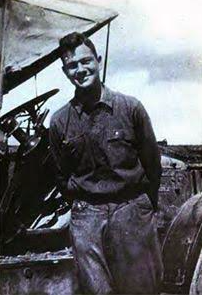

He graduated from Los Angeles High School in 1915, winning the state interscholastic tennis cup as a senior. He attended Stanford University for a year, then transferred to Yale University. He left Yale in his sophomore year to join the American Field Service in Europe as an ambulance driver. He persuaded five classmates to join him in this venture. In France, he served for six months in the French Army, seeing active duty in the trenches as Fort Malmaison was recaptured. On the United States entry into the war he joined the American service as a second lieutenant and began training as an aviator. He was killed on a formation practice run on August 30, 1918. An aspiring writer, he kept a diary while serving which was published in 1919 under the title A Stop at Suzanne's: And Lower Flights, with an introduction by his father, Samuel Travers Clover.

== Honors ==
What would eventually become Santa Monica Airport was originally named Clover Field in his honor. The field was dedicated to him in 1923 before a crowd of 50,000. Cloverfield Boulevard in Santa Monica recalls the airport's original name.

Greayer's Oak Park, named for him, is located where West Avenue 38 dead-ends into North Figueroa Street in Los Angeles. A group of childhood friends planted an oak tree in his honor there in the early 1920s. On present-day maps the name is often incorrectly given as "Greaver."

He and 19 other Los Angeles High School graduates who died in World War I are honored by a stained glass window in Los Angeles High School's Memorial Library.

== Publications ==
- Greayer Clover (1919). A Stop at Suzanne's: and Lower Flights. New York: George H. Doran.
