= Chicago Evening Post =

US local newspaper (1886–1932)

- Format: Broadsheet
- Founder: James W. Scott
- Founded: March 1, 1886
- Ceased publication: October 29, 1932

The Chicago Evening Post was a daily newspaper published in Chicago, Illinois, from March 1, 1886, until October 29, 1932, when it was absorbed by the Chicago Daily News. The newspaper was founded as a penny paper during the technological paradigm shift created by linotype; it failed when the Great Depression struck.

The Evening Post identified itself as a reform newspaper, and attempted to cover muckraking stories of Chicago's political corruption. Finley Peter Dunne introduced his character Mr. Dooley in the paper in 1893. Samuel Travers Clover managed the paper from 1894 to 1900. Social journalist W.J. Cash worked at the paper for a year in 1926-1927. Managing editor Michael W. Straus worked with two significant women, Margaret C. Anderson and Ione Quinby Griggs. Anderson, the Evening Post's book critic beginning in 1913, later became a noted magazine editor and publisher. Griggs worked the Evening Post's police beat from the early 1920s until the paper was sold in 1932, winning acclaim for her ability to mesh female experience and identity with crime news.

The Chicago Public Library preserves a complete microfilm file of the Evening Post's 46-year press run.
