= Los Angeles Herald-Express =

Newspaper in California, US (1931–1962)

Los Angeles Herald Express
- Cover of Los Angeles Herald Express (March 19, 1942)
- Type: daily newspaper
- Format: Print
- Founder: Hearst Corporation
- Founded: Los Angeles Herald-Express (1931–1962); As a result of merger of Los Angeles Herald (1873–1931) and Los Angeles Express (1871–1931). In 1962, the Los Angeles Herald Express merged with the Los Angeles Examiner (1903–1962) to form the Los Angeles Herald Examiner (1963 – November 2, 1989)
- Language: English

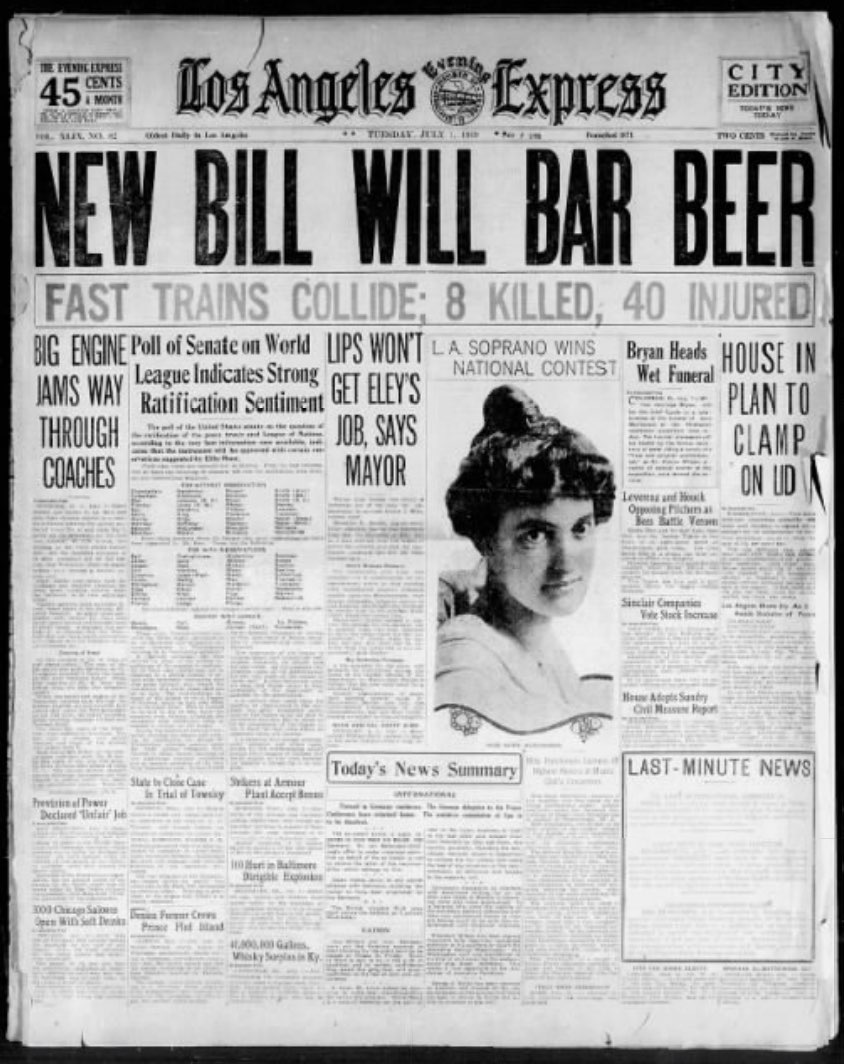
The cover of the Los Angeles Express detailing the start of the Wartime Prohibition Act on July 1, 1919

Los Angeles Herald front page (May 30, 1916

The Los Angeles Herald-Express was one of Los Angeles' oldest newspapers, formed after a combination of the Los Angeles Herald and the Los Angeles Express. After a 1962 combination with Hearst Corporation's Los Angeles Examiner, the paper became the Los Angeles Herald-Examiner, folding on November 2, 1989.

== History ==
=== Los Angeles Express ===
The Los Angeles Express was Los Angeles's oldest newspaper published under its original name until it combined with the Herald. It was established on March 27, 1871

=== Los Angeles Herald ===
Established in 1873, the Los Angeles Herald or the Evening Herald represented the largely Democratic views of the city and focused primarily on issues local to Los Angeles and Southern California. The Los Angeles Daily Herald was first published on October 2, 1873, by Charles A. Storke. It was the first newspaper in Southern California to use the innovative steam press; the newspaper's offices at 125 South Broadway were popular with the public because large windows on the ground floor allowed passersby to see the presses in motion. In 1922, the Herald officially joined the Hearst News empire.

=== Los Angeles Herald-Express ===
In 1931, Hearst merged the Los Angeles Daily Herald with the Los Angeles Evening Express to form the Los Angeles Evening Herald and Express, which was then the largest circulating evening newspaper west of the Mississippi.

=== Los Angeles Herald Examiner ===
The Los Angeles Herald Examiner was a major Los Angeles daily newspaper, published in the afternoon from Monday to Friday and in the morning on Saturdays and Sundays. It was part of the Hearst syndicate. The afternoon Herald-Express and the morning Examiner, both of which had been publishing in the same downtown Los Angeles building since the turn of the 19th-20th centuries, merged in 1962.

A Los Angeles historian wrote in 2010, “A 1962 merger [of the Examiner] with the Los Angeles Herald-Express, Hearst's afternoon paper, was merely a formality, as the two papers had shared workspace for decades.”

For a few years after the merger, the Herald Examiner claimed the largest afternoon-newspaper circulation in the country.

It published its last edition on November 2, 1989.

== Notable people ==
- Samuel Travers Clover, became editor of the Express in 1902.
- John Tracy Gaffey, first editor of the Los Angeles Herald
- C.H. Garrigues, writer
- Grace Kingsley, feature writer
- Dave Stannard, Los Angeles City Council member, 1942–43
- William Ivan "Ike" St. Johns and Adela Rogers St. Johns, a popular husband-and-wife reporting team, were among the notable Herald staff in the early years.
- John Kenneth Turner, muckraker
- William J. Harrison, Circulation Director
- Agness Underwood, Reporter and then City-Editor
