= Chicago Times =

American newspaper (1854–1895)

- Type: Daily newspaper
- Format: Broadsheet
- Owner(s): James W. Sheahan (1854–1861); Wilbur F. Storey (1861–1884); James W. Scott (1895); H. H. Kohlsaat (1895–1901)
- Founder: James W. Sheahan
- Founded: 1854; 172 years ago
- Ceased publication: 1901; merged with the Chicago Record to form the Chicago Record-Herald
- City: Chicago, Illinois
- Country: United States

The Chicago Times was a newspaper in Chicago from 1854 to 1895, when it merged with the Chicago Herald, to become the Chicago Times-Herald. The Times-Herald effectively disappeared in 1901 when it merged with the Chicago Record to become the Chicago Record-Herald.

The Times was founded in 1854 by James W. Sheahan, Daniel Cameron, and Isaac Cook with the support of Democratic leader Stephen A. Douglas. In 1861, after the paper was purchased by Democratic journalist Wilbur F. Storey, the Times began espousing the Copperhead point of view, in opposition to President Abraham Lincoln and especially his policy of emancipating the slaves. During the Civil War, General Ambrose Burnside, head of the Department of the Ohio, suppressed the paper in 1863 because of its hostility to the Union cause, but Lincoln lifted the ban when he received word of it.

Storey and Republican Joseph Medill, editor of the Chicago Tribune, maintained a bitter rivalry for some time. In 1888, the newspaper saw the brief addition of Finley Peter Dunne to its staff. Dunne was a columnist whose Mr. Dooley satires won him national recognition. After just one year, Dunne left the Times to work for the rival Chicago Tribune.

In 1895, the Times became the Chicago Times-Herald after a merger with the Chicago Herald, a newspaper founded in 1881 by James W. Scott. After Scott's sudden death in the weeks following the merger, H. H. Kohlsaat took over the new paper. He changed its direction from a "Democratic" publication to an "independent Republican" one. It supported "sound money" (pro-gold) policies (against free silver) in the 1896 election.

Kohlsaat bought the Chicago Record from Chicago Daily News publisher Victor F. Lawson in 1901 and merged it with the Times-Herald to form the Chicago Record-Herald. Frank B. Noyes acquired an interest in the new newspaper at the time and served as publisher, with Kohlsaat as editor.

== See also ==
- Chicago Record-Herald
