= James W. Scott =

American newspaper editor

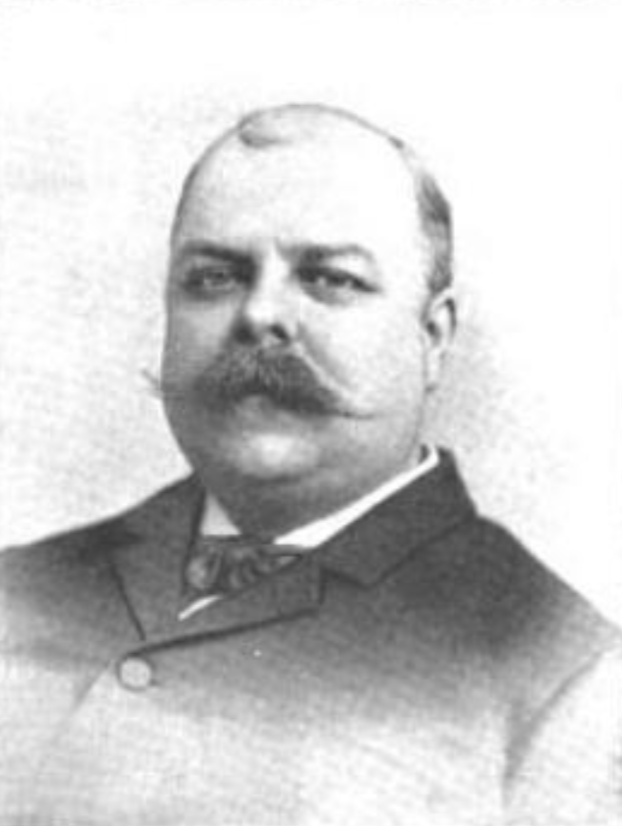
- Born: James Wilmot Scott; June 1849; Walworth County, Wisconsin, US
- Died: April 14, 1895 (aged 45); New York City, New York, US
- Resting place: Graceland Cemetery
- Occupations: Editor, publisher
- Known for: Chicago Times-Herald, Chicago Evening Post
- Spouse: Carrie Green (m. 1876)

James Wilmot Scott (1849–1895) was an American newspaper editor who was the publisher and principal owner of the Chicago Times-Herald and Chicago Evening Post.

== Biography ==
Scott's grave at Graceland Cemetery

James Wilmot Scott was born in Walworth County, Wisconsin in June 1849. He married Carrie Green in 1876.

He served four terms as President of the American Newspaper Publishers Association and was on the executive committee for the World's Columbian Exposition, of which he was an early promoter.

He died suddenly while vacationing at the Holland House in New York City in April 1895. He was buried at Graceland Cemetery in Chicago.
