= Wilbur F. Storey =

American journalist (1819–1884)

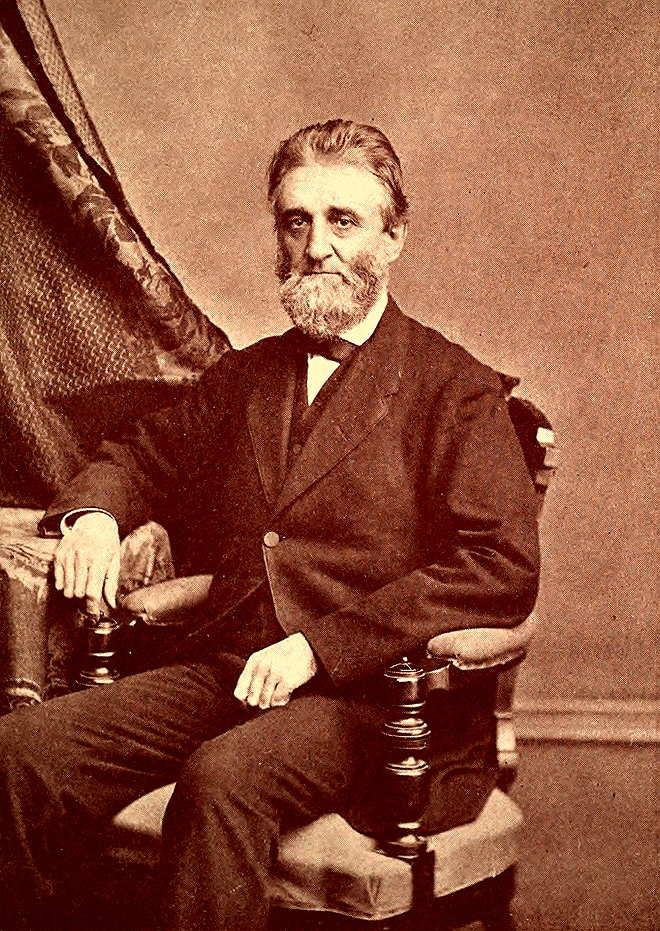
- Born: December 19, 1819; Salisbury, Vermont
- Died: October 27, 1884 (aged 64); Chicago, Illinois
- Burial place: Rosehill Cemetery
- Occupation: Journalist

Wilbur Fisk Storey (December 19, 1819 – October 27, 1884) was an American journalist and newspaper publisher who was instrumental in the growth of the Detroit Free Press and the Chicago Times. During the American Civil War, Storey pursued a "Copperhead" political line of vehement opposition to Abraham Lincoln and the Union war effort.

== Biography ==
=== Early years ===
Wilbur Fisk Storey was born December 19, 1819, in Salisbury, Vermont. He spent his childhood years on his father's farm, attending local common-schools during the winter months.

The family subsequently moved to Middlebury, Vermont, where Storey was apprenticed to a printer at the age of 12. He worked in the office of the Middlebury True Press until the age of 17, when he gathered his meager savings and relocated to New York City to work as a compositor for the Journal of Commerce.

In 1838, Storey moved West to La Porte, Indiana to launch a newspaper of his own, a Democratic paper edited by future United States Senator Edward A. Hannegan. The publishing venture never attained profitability, however, and Storey went into commerce as the proprietor of a local drug store.

Growing tired of Indiana, Storey moved next to Jackson, Michigan, where he studied law for two years. He established there the Jackson Patriot, another paper lending its allegiance to the Democratic Party. He was appointed postmaster for Jackson under James K. Polk's administration as a reward for his support, whereupon he sold the paper. In 1849, new Whig President Zachary Taylor exercised his power of political patronage and removed the Democrat Storey from the postmaster position. Out of work, Storey launched another drug store. He was chosen the year following a member of the Michigan constitutional convention, and was subsequently appointed state prison inspector.

=== Detroit Free Press ===
In 1853 he moved to Detroit, where he obtained a minority ownership share in the struggling Free Press. He subsequently bought out his partners, first purchasing a 50% stake in the publication before becoming sole owner and publisher. Over the next eight years the paper grew in size and influence, becoming one of the largest Democratic papers in the West and enabling Storey to accumulate a financial nest-egg of $30,000.

=== Chicago Times ===
He went to Chicago in 1861 and purchased the Times, which then had a very small circulation. He redid the typography, sensationalized the presentation, and added local news. His energy, enterprise, and fearless expression of his views on every subject gave the paper notoriety. He was independent in an extreme way, boasting that he had no friends and wanted none, and apparently doing his utmost to create enemies. His whole mind was bent on giving the news, though his idea of what constituted news frequently struck some as morbid and indecorous. His efforts yielded him a large fortune.

Storey had supported Stephen A. Douglas in the 1860 presidential election. While opposing secession, the Times became a vehement critic of Abraham Lincoln after the Emancipation Proclamation was issued. General Ambrose Burnside shut it down in 1863 for two days, but loyalists complained about the suppression of freedom of the press, and Lincoln quickly lifted the ban on the paper's publication. The paper's plant was destroyed in the Great Chicago Fire of 1871, but after publishing out of improvised facilities for two years, it began publishing from a new facility in 1873. It established a London bureau in 1877 to get news on the Russo-Turkish War of 1877-1878.

Storey was a manager, and generally left the writing to others. Per newspaper publishing, he summed up his philosophy as follows,

Whatever success I have had is due to the use of money and men. When I had a little money I had to use men. I get the best there is in a man out of him.

=== Death and legacy ===
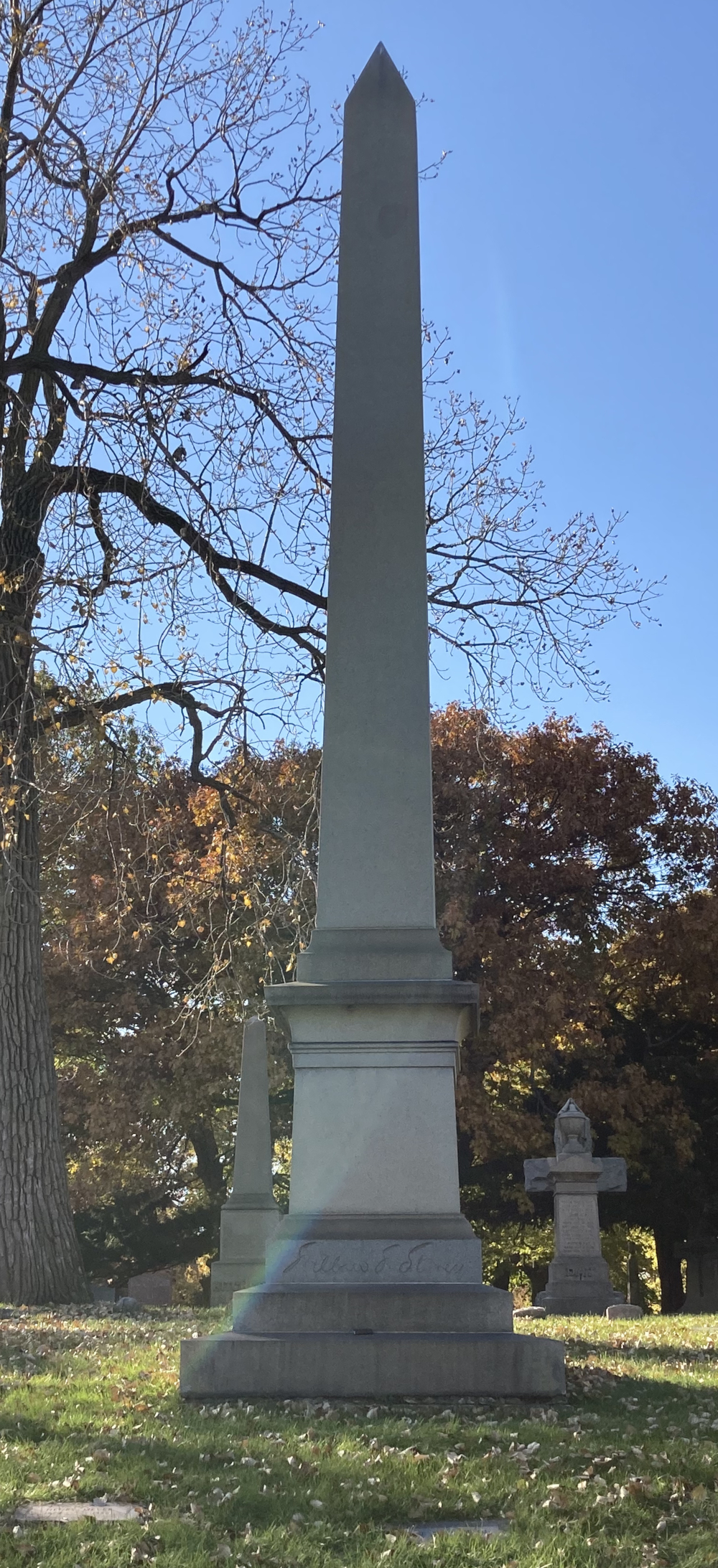
Storey's grave at Rosehill Cemetery

About 1877 his health began to fail, and he went abroad. In the summer of 1878 he had a paralytic stroke, and was brought home. Storey seems to have suffered from dementia in the aftermath, and in 1884 a conservator of his estate was appointed by the courts.

Storey died at his home in Chicago on October 27, 1884, and was buried at Rosehill Cemetery.

The editorialist of the Republican Mattoon Gazette colorfully memorialized the passing of the publisher of his paper's political rival:

Having lived the life of an Ishmaelite [outcast], ...there are almost none who mourn at his death; yet it is a fact he has left a mark upon the journalism of the country as deep as any newspaper manager in America. Master of his own fortunes and an empty pocket at 12 years he wrestled long with fate before he gained a competence, although at his death he was worth a million. In his conduct of the Times during his most successful years his professional zeal swallowed every other consideration.

He was without conscience, without any sense of propriety, had no regard for morality, decency, or the good name of any living creature in his desire to give "the news." Six years before his death his mind gave way, and for many months he had been an imbecile, whose conception was too feeble to comprehend the audacity of those who had already begun a quarrel over the property accumulated by his own individual effort before he was borne away to his unhonored grave.
