= City editor =

A city editor is a section editor of a newspaper responsible for daily news from a city or metropolitan area. They often work at night to be able to track news that happens at any time and include it in the following day's publication.

== Regional variations ==
In North and South America, a city editor is responsible for the news coverage of a newspaper's local circulation area (also sometimes called metro editor).

In the United Kingdom (often with a capital C) the term refers to the editor responsible for coverage of business in the City of London, home of the Bank of England and the London Stock Exchange and, by extension, can refer to the editor in charge coverage of daily finance news in general.
