= Charles Fanning =

Irish American historian and academic

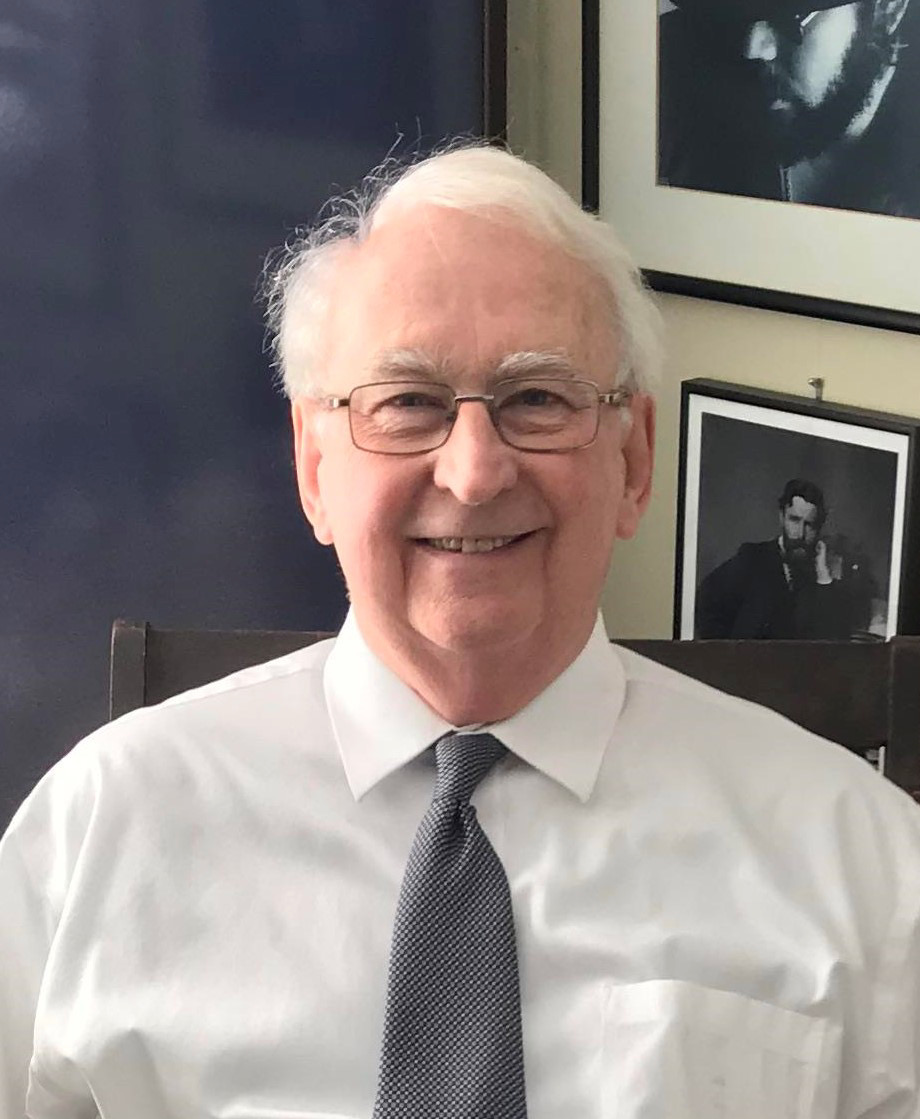
- Charles F. Fanning, Jr.
- Education: Harvard College; University of Pennsylvania
- Occupations: Historian, educator
- Spouse: Frances Fanning
- Children: 2

Charles F. Fanning, Jr. is an American historian and academic.

== Life ==
He grew up in Norwood, Massachusetts. He graduated from Harvard College in 1964, with a master's in 1966. From the University of Pennsylvania with a master's and doctoral degrees, in 1968 and 1972. He taught at Bridgewater State College, and at Southern Illinois University Carbondale from 1993 to 2007. He and his wife, Frances, live in St. Louis, Missouri. They have two children, Stephen, born in 1982 and Ellen, born in 1984.

A Medal and Lecture in Irish Studies are named for him.

== Awards ==
- 1979 Frederick Jackson Turner Award from the Organization of American Historians for Finley Peter Dunne and Mr. Dooley: The Chicago Years
- 1989 American Book Award for The Exiles of Erin: Nineteenth-Century Irish-American Fiction
- 1991 Prize for Literary Criticism from the American Conference for Irish Studies for The Irish Voice in America
- 2004 Outstanding Scholar, Southern Illinois University Carbondale

== Bibliography ==
- The woman of the house: some themes in Irish-American fiction. Irish Studies Program, Northeastern University. 1985.
- Charles Fanning (1990). The Irish voice in America: 250 years of Irish-American fiction. University Press of Kentucky. ISBN 978-0-8131-1721-8. (second edition 2000 ISBN 978-0-8131-0970-1 )
- Finley Peter Dunne and Mr. Dooley: The Chicago Years. University Press of Kentucky. 1978. ISBN 978-0-8131-1365-4. (reprint 2008 ISBN 978-1-59740-420-4)
- Mapping Norwood: An Irish-American Memoir. University of Massachusetts Press. 2010. ISBN 978-1-55849-810-5.

=== Editor ===
- Finley Peter Dunne (1987). Charles Fanning (ed.). Mr. Dooley and the Chicago Irish: the autobiography of a nineteenth-century ethnic group. Catholic University of America Press. ISBN 978-0-8132-0650-9.
- Charles Fanning, ed. (1997). The Exiles of Erin: nineteenth-century Irish-American fiction. Dufour Editions. ISBN 9780802313157.
- James Thomas Farrell (1998). Charles Fanning (ed.). Chicago Stories. University of Illinois Press. ISBN 978-0-252-01981-4.
- Charles Fanning, ed. (2000). New perspectives on the Irish diaspora. SIU Press. ISBN 978-0-8093-2344-9.
- John V. Kelleher (2002). Charles Fanning (ed.). Selected writings of John V. Kelleher on Ireland and Irish America. SIU Press. ISBN 978-0-8093-2482-8.
- James T. Farrell (2007). Charles Fanning (ed.). No Star Is Lost. University of Illinois Press. ISBN 978-0-252-07422-6.
- James Thomas Farrell (2007). Charles Fanning (ed.). A world I never made. University of Illinois Press. ISBN 978-0-252-07423-3.
- James T. Farrell (2008). Charles Fanning (ed.). The Face of Time. University of Illinois Press. ISBN 978-0-252-03310-0.
- James T. Farrell (2008). Charles Fanning (ed.). Father and Son. University of Illinois Press. ISBN 978-0-252-07495-0.
- James T. Farrell (2008). Charles Fanning (ed.). My Days of Anger. University of Illinois Press. ISBN 978-0-252-03270-7.
