= List of women sportswriters =

The following is a partial list of women sportswriters.

== European ==
=== British ===
- Elizabeth Ammon, cricket writer for The Guardian, The Daily Mirror, The Independent, and The Times
- Margaret Hughes (1919–2005); first woman to cover The Ashes series of 1954–55 for the Sydney Daily Telegraph.
- Martha Kelner (born 1990), sportswriter for the Daily Mail and The Guardian.
- Anna Kessel (born 1979), sportswriter and journalist for The Guardian, The Daily Telegraph, and The Observer newspapers.
- Vikki Orvice (1962–2019), football reporter for The Sun and subsequently the newspaper's athletics correspondent.
- Diana Rait Kerr (1918–2012), cricket writer and cricket historian
- Netta Rheinberg (1911–2006), Women's Cricket magazine editor, sportswriter for Wisden, columnist for The Cricketer
- Alyson Rudd (born 1963), football reporter for The Times
- Julie Welch (born 1948), first female sportswriter on Fleet Street, covering football
- Suzanne Wrack, football writer for The Guardian and BBC Sport, covering women's football

== North American ==
=== American ===
- Kendra Andrews (born 1997), sportswriter for ESPN.com; previously for NBC Sports Bay Area and The Athletic
- Malika Andrews (born 1995), sports journalist for ESPN.com; previously for Chicago Tribune, The New York Times,
- Nancy Armour, sportswriter for USA Today, previously for Associated Press; covered the Olympic Games.
- Judy Battista (born 1969), sportswriter covering American football for the Miami Herald, Newsday, The New York Times
- Amalie Benjamin, sportswriter covering the National Hockey League; previously covered the Boston Red Sox for The Boston Globe
- Christine Brennan (born 1958), columnist for USA Today; previously covered American football and the Olympics for the Miami Herald and The Washington Post
- Liz Clarke, writer for The Washington Post, the Dallas Morning News, The Charlotte Observer, and USA Today; covered NASCAR, tennis, college sports, the Washington Redskins/Commanders, and nine Olympic Games.
- Alex Coffey (born 1993), beat reporter for the Philadelphia Inquirer, covering the Philadelphia Phillies. Previously covered the Oakland Athletics and Seattle Storm for The Athletic.
- Adeline Daley (1921–1984), sports columnist for the San Francisco Call-Bulletin and San Francisco Chronicle, covering baseball.
- Rachel Annamarie DeMita
- Katherine Dunn (1945–2016), novelist who covered boxing for the Willamette Week, The Oregonian, and The New York Times
- Helene Elliott, sportswriter for the Los Angeles Times from 1989 to 2004, covering ice hockey; recipient of the Elmer Ferguson Memorial Award.
- Kate Fagan (born 1981), sportswriter for ESPN; previously worked for The Philadelphia Inquirer, covering the NBA's Philadelphia 76ers.
- Cynthia Frelund
- Jennifer Frey
- Mary Garber
- Carrie Gerlach Cecil
- Jean Giambrone
- Toni Ginnetti
- Jane Gross
- Maggie Hathaway
- Robin Herman
- Jemele Hill
- Margaret Holt
- Sally Jenkins
- Christina Kahrl
- Michelle Kaufman
- Linda Kay
- Ann Killion
- Mina Kimes
- Gwen Knapp
- Sarah Langs
- Jane Leavy
- Marjorie Herrera Lewis
- Melissa Ludtke
- Alison Lukan
- Jackie MacMullan
- Myra MacPherson
- Juliet Macur
- Idah McGlone Gibson
- Sadie Kneller Miller
- Marie Millikan
- Rachel Nichols
- Lisa Olson
- Maureen Orcutt
- Molly Qerim
- Marly Rivera
- Alanna Rizzo
- Selena Roberts
- Sherry Ross
- Holly Rowe
- Jen Royle
- Lisa Nehus Saxon
- Nell Scovell
- Mary Shane
- Ramona Shelburne
- Susan Slusser
- Claire Smith
- Shelley Smith
- Sage Steele
- Karintha Styles
- Lou Swarz
- Jenny Taft
- Lillian Vickers-Smith
- Maribel Vinson
- Lesley Visser
- Charean Williams
- Joan Wulff
- Ina Eloise Young
- Ellen Zavian

=== Canadian ===
- Cheryl Bernard
- Christie Blatchford
- Alexandrine Gibb
- Alison Gordon
- Kirstie McLellan Day
- Lorna Schultz Nicholson
- Jill Officer
- Mary Ormsby
- Laura Robinson
- Shireen Ahmed

== South American ==
=== Brazilian ===
- Luana Maluf

== Oceanian ==
=== Australian ===
- Kath Commins
- Pat Jarrett
- Samantha Lane
- Cate McGregor
- Ruth Preddey
- Lois Quarrell
- Marg Ralston
- Gwen Varley

=== New Zealand ===
- Madeleine Chapman
- Ina Lamason
- Norma Williams

== See also ==
- Nine for IX
- List of women writers
- Association for Women in Sports Media
