= List of South Australian sportswomen =

South Australia has an outstanding and rich history of achievements by its sportswomen at the national and international level. This page links to the profiles of these often forgotten and unrecognised sports stars. This list includes both those born in South Australia and those who represented South Australia at Olympic, Paralympic, Commonwealth Games and the international level or who represented South Australia at the national level. Journalists and sports administrators who have made a significant contribution to development, promotion and advancement of women's sport in South Australia are also included in this list.

== A ==
- Jen Adams - lacrosse
- Frances Adcock - swimming, Olympian
- Rosemary Adey - softball, sports administration
- Rachel Aistrope - fencing
- Dianne Alagich - football (soccer)
- Kate Allen - hockey, Olympian

== B ==
- Carmel Bakurski - hockey, Olympian
- Suzanne Banks - shooting, Olympian
- Kate Barclay - canoe sprinter, Olympian
- Louise Bawden - volleyball, Olympian
- Valerie Beddoe - diving
- Miranda Bennett - rowing
- Abby Bishop - basketball
- Sharon Black - football (soccer), Olympian
- Wendy Blunsden - cricket
- Carol Boots - diving
- Jenny Borlase - netball
- Nicole Boukaram - diving
- Grace Bowman - equestrian, Paralympian
- Joanne Broadbent - cricket
- Michelle Brogan - basketball, Olympian
- Rachel Bugg - diving, Olympian
- Christine Burton - netball, Umpiring
- Dianne Burge - athletics, Olympian
- Verna Burnard - athletics, Olympian
- Alayna Burns - cycling, Olympian

== C ==
- Vicki Cardwell - squash
- Mabel Cashmore - hockey
- Barbara Caspers - shooting, Paralympian
- Andrea Chaplin - fencing, Olympian
- Hayley Chapman - shooting, Olympian
- Renee Chatterton - rowing, Olympian
- Jenny Cheesman - basketball, Olympian
- May Cho - table tennis
- Leanne Choo - badminton, Olympian
- Coralie Churchett - basketball, Paralympian
- Carolyn Cochrane - canoe polo, lacrosse
- Jane Crafter - golf
- Amanda Cross - rowing

== D ==
- Bea Daly - volleyball, Olympian
- Sue Dansie - volleyball, athletics, cricket
- Alison Davies - rowing, Olympian
- Hannah Davis - canoeing, Olympian
- Michelle den Dekker - netball
- Helen Denman - swimming, Olympian
- Tanya Denver (née Lewis) - journalist
- Linda Douglas - gymnastics, Olympian
- Jacqueline Dunn - gymnastics
- Tamie Durdin - golf

== E ==
- Lauren Ebsary - cricket
- Sophie Edington - swimming, Olympian
- Annette Edmondson - cycling, Olympian
- Lorraine Eiler - basketball, netball, squash, tennis
- Holly Evans - hockey
- Wendy Ey - athletics

== F ==
- Kate Fairweather - archery, Olympian
- Elaine Farmer - surf life saving, sports administration
- Kate Farrow - athletics
- Alison Feast - shooting, Olympian
- Annette Fellows - cricket
- Michelle Ferris - cycling, Olympian
- Lynda Folauhola - diving, Olympian
- Ange Foley - AFLW
- Selina Follas - softball, Olympian
- Dawn Fraser - swimming, Olympian
- Lyn 'Lefty' Fullston - cricket, netball

== G ==
- Karen Gardiner (née Kah) - speed skating, Olympian
- Emma George - athletics
- Laura Giaretto - basketball, cricket, rugby
- Margaret Gibson - swimming, Olympian
- Amy Gillett - cycling, rowing, Olympian
- June Goodhand - lawn bowls
- Tania Gooley-Humphry - volleyball, Olympian
- Tammy Gough - table tennis
- Donna Gould - cycling, athletics, Olympian
- Robyn Grey-Gardner - rowing, Olympian
- Tatiana Grigorieva - athletics, Olympian

== H ==
- Amber Halliday - rowing, cycling, Olympian
- Juliet Haslam - hockey, Olympian
- Kathryn Harby-Williams - netball, sports commentator
- Rayoni Head - badminton, Olympian
- Audrey Hefford - lawn bowls
- Yvonne Hill - shooting, Olympian
- Sue Hobbs - wheelchair basketball, Paralympian
- Alexandra Hodge - netball
- Laura Hodges - basketball, Olympian
- Sue Hooley (née Aish) - netball, softball
- Lee-Anne Hunter - cricket

== I ==
- Lynley Ingerson (née Hamilton) - cricket, netball

== J ==
- Marjorie Jackson-Nelson - athletics, Olympian
- Jana Jamnicky - handball, Olympian
- Joan Jones - badminton
- Megan Jones - equestrian, Olympian
- Marg Jude - cricket, hockey
- Tunde Juhasz - cricket

== K ==
- Shirley Kelly - lawn bowls
- Jill Kennare - cricket, lacrosse
- Jeanette Kieboom
- Gail Kingston - lacrosse
- Carmen Klomp - rowing, Olympian
- Anne-Marie Knight - golf
- Libby Kosmala - shooting, Paralympian
- Brooke Krueger-Billett - athletics, Olympian

== L ==
- Dot Laughton - cricket, hockey
- Jenny Laurendet - athletics
- Tiffany Lee - Australian football
- Lyn Lillecrapp - swimming, Paralympian
- Marie Little - disability sport, sports administration

== M ==
- Vicky Machen - powerlifting, Paralympian
- Yvonne Majoor - swimming
- Pauline Manser - indoor and beach volleyball, Olympian
- Lisa Martin - athletics, Olympian
- Anna Maycock - volleyball
- Renae Maycock - volleyball, Olympian
- Andrea McCauley - cricket
- Kay McFarlane - basketball, Olympian
- Anna McVann - swimming, Olympian
- Anna Meares - cycling, Olympian
- Patricia Mickan - basketball, netball, Olympian
- May Mills OBE - sports administration pioneer, advocacy, education
- Kerry Modra - cycling, Paralympian
- Tania Modra - cycling, Paralympian
- Marina Moffa - basketball, Olympian
- Alicia Molik - tennis, Olympian
- Melissa Morgan - swimming, Olympian
- Simmone Morrow - softball, Olympian
- Stephanie Morton - cycling, Paralympian
- Tracey Mosley - softball, Olympian
- Belinda Muehlberg - shooting
- Sylvia Muehlberg - shooting, Olympian

== N ==
- Stephanie Na - golf
- Joy Nancy-Twining - badminton
- Jill Need - cricket
- Hannah Nielsen - lacrosse
- Sally Newmarch - rowing, Olympian
- Shelley Nitschke - cricket
- Denise Norton - swimming, SA's first Olympian
- Glynis Nunn - athletics, Olympian
- Julie Nykiel - netball, basketball, Olympian

== O ==
- Wendy Old - athletics
- Barbara Orchard - cricket
- Mary Ormsby - lawn bowls
- Anna Ozolins - rowing, Olympian

== P ==
- Deborah Palmer - swimming, Olympian
- Becchara Palmer - volleyball, Olympian
- Sarnya Parker - cycling, Paralympian
- Katy Parrish - athletics, Paralympian
- Anna Pazera - athletics, Olympian
- Alison Peek - hockey, Olympian
- Erin Phillips - basketball, Olympian
- Mary Pickett - lacrosse
- Wendy Piltz - lacrosse, cricket, PDHPE teacher-education, author
- Sandra Pisani - hockey, Olympian
- Hilda Ponchon - lawn bowls
- Kerri Pottharst - volleyball, Olympian
- Eileen Pritchard - hockey

== Q ==
- Lois Quarrell - journalist
- Carolyn Quigley - shooting, Olympian

== R ==
- Marg Ralston - journalist, editor, sports advisor
- Alexis Rhodes - Olympian
- Leonie Roberts - equestrian
- Shelley Rogers - swimming, Paralympian
- Gillian Rolton - equestrian, Olympian
- Karen Rolton - cricket
- Isabella Rositano - canoe sprint, AFL Women's
- Julie Russell - athletics, basketball, powerlifting, Paralympian
- Sarah Ryan - swimming, Olympian

== S ==
- Kathy Sambell - athletics, Olympian
- Rebecca Sanders - netball
- Wendy Schaeffer - equestrian, Olympian
- Betty Schenke - lawn bowls
- Jennifer Screen - basketball, Olympian
- Ann Shanley - athletics
- Joy Shiels - netball
- Sharon Slann - basketball, Paralympian
- Kate Slatter - rowing, Olympian
- Kerina Smallhorn - hockey, Indigenous sportswoman
- Lisa-Anne Smith - shooting, Olympian
- Caroline South - swimming
- Justine Sowry - hockey
- Rachael Sporn - basketball, Olympian
- Peta Squire - netball
- Jan Stirling - basketball coach, Olympian
- Rebecca Stoeckel - swimming
- Vanessa Stokes - softball, Indigenous sportswoman
- Marina Sulicich - gymnastics, Olympian
- Sue Summers - cricket
- Laura Summerton - basketball, Olympian
- Sarah Sutter - netball

== T ==
- Claire Tallent - athletics, Olympian
- Erica Taylor - equestrian, Olympian
- Kylie Taylor - lacrosse
- Evelyn Tazewell - hockey, cricket
- Mary Teasdale-Smith - hockey, equestrian
- Susan Tegg - canoeing, Olympian
- Faith Thomas - cricket, hockey, Indigenous sportswoman
- Norma Thrower - athletics, Olympian
- Melissa Trafela - powerlifting, Paralympian
- Jessica Trengove - athletics, Olympian
- Leanne Trimboli - football (soccer), Olympian
- Suzanne Twelftree - tennis, powerlifting, Paralympian

== V ==
- Tania Van Heer-Murphy - netball, athletics
- Natalie von Bertouch - netball

== W ==
- Desiree Wakefield Baynes - shooting, Olympian
- Sue Watkins - hockey, Olympian
- Katrina Webb - athletics, Paralympian
- Dorothy Wheeler - lawn bowls
- Alex Wilson - basketball, Indigenous sportswoman
- Kate Wilson-Smith - badminton, Olympian
- Jenny Williams - lacrosse, cricket, soccer, touch
- Val Winter - shooting, Olympian
- Barbara Worley - disability sport, sports administration
- Arrienne Wynen - lawn bowls

== Y ==
- Song Yang - badminton
