= Lois Quarrell =

Australian sports journalist

- Born: 19 November 1914; Corryton, South Australia
- Died: 19 June 1991 (aged 76); Adelaide, South Australia
- Occupation: Journalist
- Known for: Sports journalism, Women's sport

Lois Gertrude Quarrell (1914–1991) was a pioneering sports journalist in South Australia who raised the profile of women's sports from the mid-1930s until her retirement in 1970. She worked to legitimise women's sports in a time when there was societal trend to trivialise it.

== Birth and education ==
Quarrell was born at Corryton, South Australia on 19 November 1914. She was the second of five children of Alfred James and Lottie May (née Overington) Quarrell. She was educated at Adelaide Technical High School, where she also played hockey and cricket, and was captain of the senior basketball team.

== Early career ==
She began her work as a journalist at age 17, in 1932 and began sports writing in 1935. She was one of the first female sports journalists in Australia; one of three in the nation in the 1930s and the first to write for The Advertiser, Adelaide's daily newspaper.

Quarrell's work regularly identified and recognised the skill of South Australia's early pioneers in women's sport including Australian representatives Mabel Cashmore and Evelyn Tazewell in hockey, netballers Gwen Rankin and Lorna Ryan, cricketers Dot Laughton and Barbara Orchard, and the state's first female Olympian, swimmer Denise Norton. Her column regularly covered a wide range of sports, including table tennis, softball, cricket, hockey, netball, tennis, sailing, surf life saving, equestrian, and rowing. In an age without digital technology, Quarrell rode her bike to sporting events across Adelaide to watch and report on them.

Quarrell contributed a half-page column in The Advertiser from 1936 devoted entirely to women in sport; their issues, skill and achievements, often in the face of crushing societal criticism of their natural ability and their expected roles. She used her influence in the media to encourage women to be involved in sports and to administer their own sporting organisations. She strongly argued for the inclusion of 'games' for girls in the school curriculum, against opposition who believed that girls playing sport would rob them of their femininity. Other issues she created debate about through her work in the media and involvement in sports administration within the state included sport and motherhood, the restrictions of sports uniforms on participation.

== Contribution to women's sports ==
Quarrell played a key role during the '30s in the development of women's sports in South Australia, making it her business to speak up within an industry reluctant to cover the topic. As an active sportswoman herself, she provided diverse and learned insight into the motivation, commitment, efforts and achievements of sports throughout South Australia. Her work in the media highlighted the plethora of opportunities for women to be involved in sport from grassroots to international levels in a variety of roles and capacities. Quarrell used her work to protest against and ridicule the paternalism of sport's governing bodies and helped women's sports to become self-governing.

Her work helped to highlight role models, opportunity and the real social issues and expectations which impacted women of the time. Yet Quarrell's great challenge to how women's sport is valued and reported in the mainstream media remains despite the social movements of the 1960s and 1970s and equal opportunity laws focussed on removing discrimination based on gender.

While some gains were made in the '80s and '90s, in the current media climate women's sports receives limited and often narrowly focused coverage in the traditional commercial mainstream media in Australia. The Crawford Report reported "of 50 NSOs the panel consulted only 15 had a female CEO or executive director. Of the 350 board positions in these organizations, only 25% are held by women. With roughly the same number of participants in sport, it would be realistic goal to have closer to 50% representation of women in these leadership roles". Many of the women's sport specific organisations Quarrell's work helped to establish in South Australia were disbanded as sports chose to merge men and women's sports association and it can be argued that this change has been at the detriment of the profile and opportunities for women in sport.

A movement begun in 2013, by high-profile South Australian sportswoman Jenny Williams seeks to use digital media technology to reignite the debate and the raise the profile of women's sports past and present in South Australia. Carrying on in the spirit of Lois Quarrell and the fine work during the '80s and '90s of female sports journalists such as Marg Ralston and Tanya Lewis, the South Australian Women's Sports Network provides access to news, history, sports reports and achievements of South Australian sportswomen not widely recognised in mainstream traditional media. The Advertiser journalist Ben Hook acknowledged this work by promoting the site in a sports article in May 2013.
