= Crawford Report =

Crawford Report refers to one of four reports that reviewed and made recommendations regarding the administration of Australian sports. The principal author of each report was David Crawford. Two sport specific reports resulted in a significant restructure of the administration of that sport in Australia. A third sports system focussed report has recommended significant changes to the Australian sports system.

The four reports were:

- The 1992 review of the administration of the Australian Football League
- The 2003 Report of the Independent Soccer Review Committee
- The Independent Sport Panel Report (Crawford Report)
- A 2011 report on the administration of Cricket Australia
