= Quarrell =

Quarrell is a surname. Notable people with the surname include:

- Jami Reid-Quarrell (born 1978), Scottish actor
- John Quarrell (1938–2000), Australian rules footballer
- Lois Quarrell (1914–1991), Australian sports journalist
