= Cyrus Willard =

American politician

Cyrus D. Willard (1830–1913) was a contractor and mason in 19th century Los Angeles, California. He also was a member of the Los Angeles Common Council and the Los Angeles County Grand Jury.

== History ==
Willard was born in Sharon, Maine, on June 17, 1830. He went to school there and served an apprenticeship in Boston, Massachusetts.

Spurred by tales of the California Gold Rush, he came by sea to San Francisco, where he landed on his 20th birthday in 1850. He first went to the gold mines in the Sierra Nevada, then the Humboldt Bay, where he did lumbering. He returned to San Francisco in 1861, where he was superintendent of construction with the Lighthouse Construction Department of the United States Lighthouse Service.

=== Los Angeles ===
He moved to Los Angeles in 1876 and, besides his building enterprises, he invested in real estate. Willard was active in the California National Guard, attaining the rank of major.

He was a member of the Los Angeles Common Council from 1885 to 1886, representing the city's 5th Ward.

Willard and his partner, C.F. Collins, did the masonry work for significant buildings in Downtown Los Angeles, including: the Nadeau Building (1881); the Bullard Building, the Bradbury Building; and the Los Angeles City Hall (1888) used from 1888–1928.

From 1891 to 1897, he was secretary of the Los Angeles Chamber of Commerce, and from 1897 to 1900 he was general manager of the Los Angeles Evening Express.

Willard was a member of the 1899 Los Angeles County Grand Jury, and the year after completing his work there he suffered a "stroke of paralysis."

He died in April 1913 at the age of 83. Unmarried, he bequeathed shares of his estate to his business partner, James M. Wadsworth, and to various friends and relatives. He left $2,500 to the town library of New Sharon, Maine.
