= David Crawford (businessman) =

Australian businessman (1944–2024)

David Alexander Crawford AO (17 January 1944 – 5 December 2024) was a prominent Australian non-executive director.

== Education ==
He was educated at Scotch College, Melbourne and Ormond College at the University of Melbourne where he graduated with a Bachelor of Commerce and a Bachelor of Laws from Melbourne Law School.

== Business career ==
His directorships have included:

- Chairman of Foster's Group
- Chairman of Lendlease
- Chairman of National Foods
- Chairman of KPMG Australia
- Director of BHP
- Director of Westpac
- Chairman of the Australian Ballet
- Chairman of South32
- Vice-President (and formerly Treasurer) of the Melbourne Cricket Club

Crawford served as Council Member and Chairman of the private school Scotch College, Melbourne.

== Sport Administration ==
Crawford headed inquiries for the Australian Government which reviewed the Australian Football League, Football Federation Australia (2003 Report of the Independent Soccer Review Committee) and the Future of Sport in Australia. ((Independent Sport Panel Report (Crawford Report)). He also reported into Cricket Australia.

Crawford was Melbourne Cricket Club Committee Member from 1997 to 2013 and was elected Treasurer in 2001 and Vice President in 2009.

== Awards and recognition ==
In the 2009 Queen's Birthday Honours Crawford was made an Officer of the Order of Australia (AO) for "service to business as a director of public companies, to sport, particularly through the review and restructure of national sporting bodies, and to the community through contributions to arts and educational organisations".
