= Alex Coffey =

American sportswriter

- Born: 1993 (age 32–33); New York City, U.S.
- Education: College of William and Mary (B.A.)
- Occupation: Sportswriter
- Employer(s): The Athletic (2019–2021); The Philadelphia Inquirer (2022–present)
- Relatives: Wayne Coffey (father); Sam Coffey (sister)

Alexandra Coffey (born c. March 1993) is an American sportswriter who currently works for the Philadelphia Inquirer. From 2019 to 2021, she covered the Oakland Athletics and the Seattle Storm for The Athletic and was the beat writer for the Philadelphia Phillies for the Inquirer from 2022 to 2024. Currently, she writes featured articles and columns about Philadelphia sports.

Coffey is the daughter of sportswriter Wayne Coffey of the New York Daily News, and his wife, Denise; she grew up in Sleepy Hollow, New York, alongside her younger sister Sam Coffey, the Olympic gold medalist soccer player. She graduated from the College of William and Mary with a degree in Civil War history and currently resides in Philadelphia. Out of college, she initially worked at the Baseball Hall of Fame under Craig Muder in the communications department. She was later hired by the Seattle Mariners public relations department but found the job not to her liking and left for a career in sportswriting.

During her beat with the Phillies, Coffey made national news after an interaction with former Phillies baseball player Pete Rose. Asking Rose about his 2017 sexual assault allegations and the appropriateness of his presence at Citizens Bank Park as part of the celebration of the 1980 World Series championship team, Rose responded by treating Coffey dismissively: "No, I'm not here to talk about that. Sorry about that. It was 55 years ago, babe."

== See also ==
- List of women sportswriters
