= James Joseph Ayers =

Scottish-American politician (1830–1897)

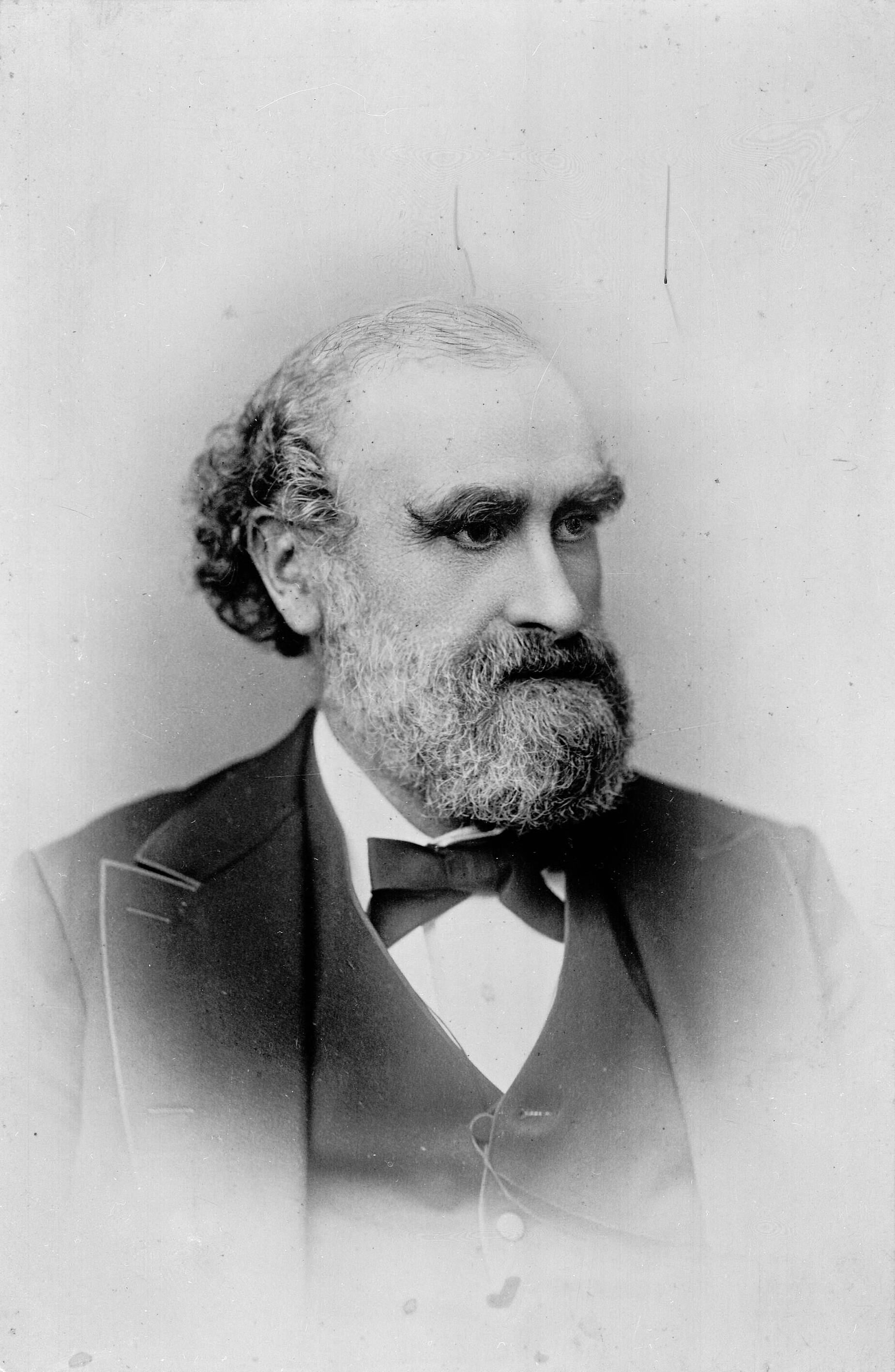

California State Printer
- In office January 10, 1883 – January 13, 1887
- Appointed by: George Stoneman
- Preceded by: John D. Young
- Succeeded by: Philip A. Shuaff

Delegate to the Second Constitutional Convention of California
- In office September 28, 1878 – March 3, 1879
- Preceded by: Office established
- Succeeded by: Office abolished
- Constituency: 4th congressional district

Personal details
- Born: August 27, 1830 Glasgow, Scotland
- Died: November 12, 1897 (aged 67) Azusa, California, U.S.
- Resting place: Angelus-Rosedale Cemetery
- Party: Democratic
- Other political affiliations: Non-Partisan (1878); Workingmen's (1879)
- Spouse(s): Mary O'Brien (m. 1855; died 1869) Charlotte Slater (m. 1884)
- Occupation: Pioneer, printer, publisher, editor, politician
- Known for: Co-founding the San Francisco Call and the Los Angeles Express
- Nickname: "Colonel"

James Joseph Ayers (August 27, 1830 – November 12, 1897) was a Scottish American pioneer, newspaperman and politician who served one term as California State Printer from 1883 to 1887. He co-founded several early newspapers in California, including the San Francisco Call and the Los Angeles Express.

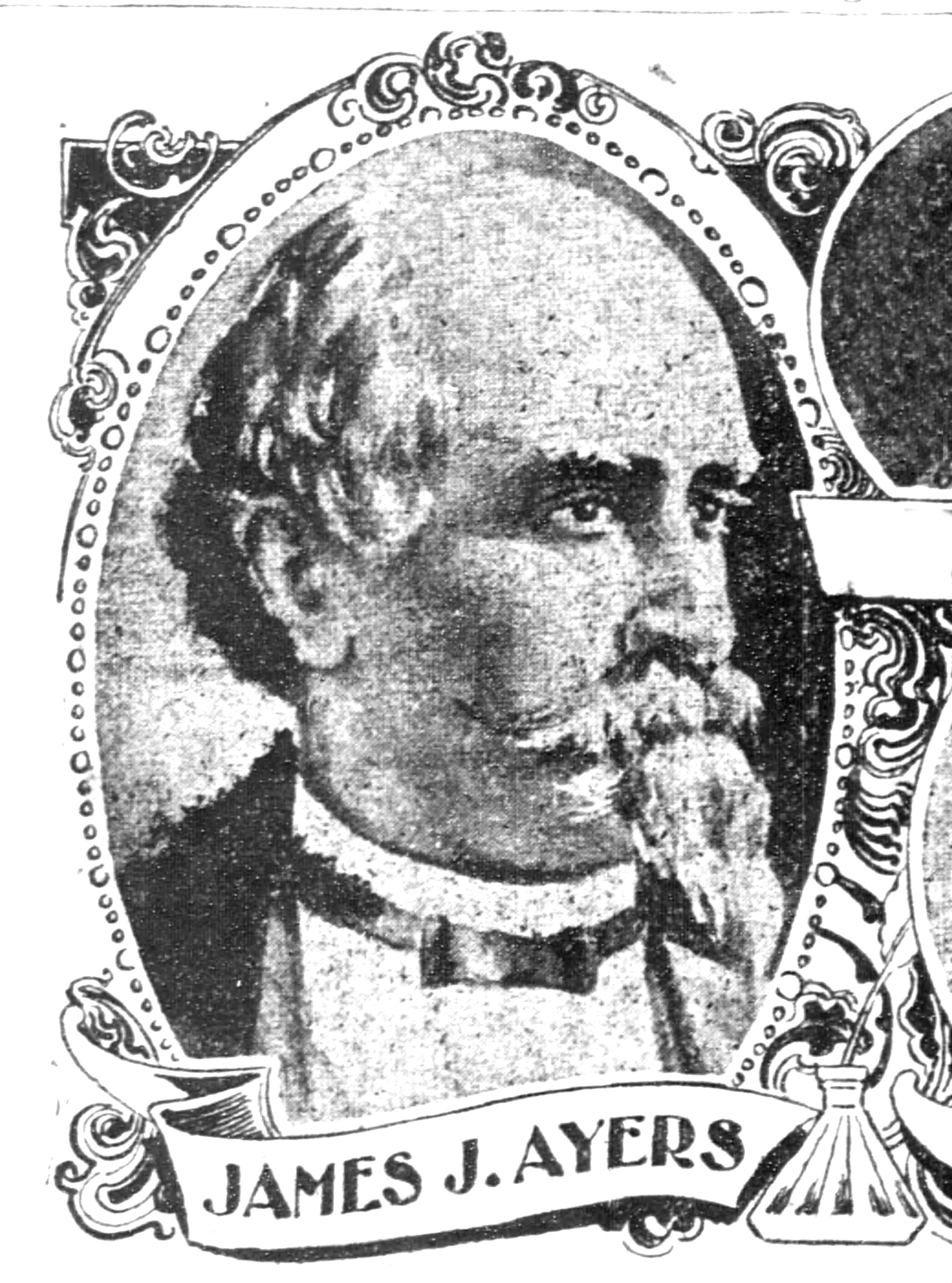
Ayers as depicted in an 1897 San Francisco Call article commemorating the paper's forty-first anniversary

In 1878, he was elected a delegate to California's Second Constitutional Convention on a Non-Partisan ticket, representing Los Angeles. The next year, he was the Workingmen's Party nominee for Congress in the 4th district, coming in third place behind Democrat R. Wallace Leach and Republican Romualdo Pacheco. In the 1882 California gubernatorial election, Ayers campaigned vigorously for Democratic candidate George Stoneman, who appointed him State Printer after his victory.

== Sources ==
- "W. P. C." The Morning Call. San Francisco. June 6, 1879.
