= Christine Brennan =

American journalist

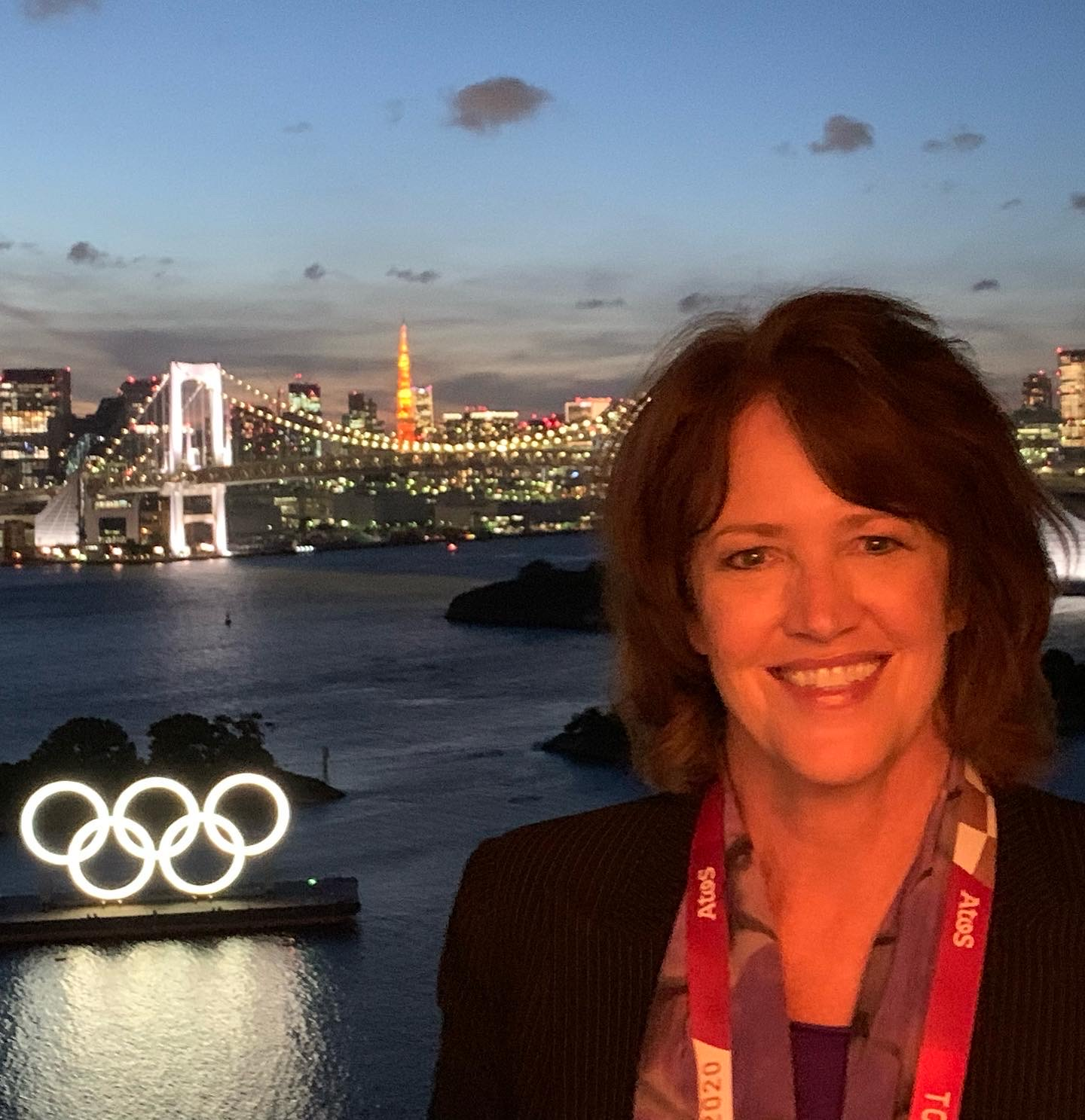
- Brennan in 2021
- Born: May 14, 1958 (age 68); Toledo, Ohio, U.S.
- Education: Northwestern University (BA, MA)
- Occupation: Sports journalist
- Years active: 1981–present
- Known for: First president of the Association for Women in Sports Media
- Notable work: Best Seat in the House (memoir), national bestseller Inside Edge, the first journalistic book on the sport of Olympic figure skating, and "On Her Game: Caitlin Clark and the Revolution in Women's Sports". "On Her Game" debuted at No. 2 on the New York Times bestseller list on July 27, 2025.

Christine Brennan (born May 14, 1958) is an American sports columnist for USA Today, a commentator on ABC News, CNN, PBS NewsHour and NPR, and an author. She was the first female sports reporter for the Miami Herald in 1981, the first woman at the Washington Post on the Washington Redskins beat in 1985, and the first president of the Association for Women in Sports Media in 1988. Brennan won the 2020 Red Smith Award, presented annually by the Associated Press Sports Editors to a person who has made "major contributions to sports journalism."

== Career ==
Brennan received bachelor's and master's degrees from the Medill School of Journalism at Northwestern University. Brennan is a member of Chi Omega sorority. After graduating, she worked for the Miami Herald, becoming the Herald's first female sports reporter in 1981. She covered the Miami Hurricanes during their trip to the 1984 Orange Bowl national championship game, after which she wrote her first book, The Miracle of Miami. At the game, she connected with former classmate Michael Wilbon, who recommended her to his Washington Post editors; she joined the Post's sports staff shortly thereafter. She covered the Washington Redskins beat for three years, then moved on to covering the Olympic Games. She worked for the Post for 12 years before joining USA Today as its national sports columnist in 1997.

She is an on-air commentator for ABC News, CNN, PBS NewsHour, and NPR. She has covered every Olympic Games, summer and winter, since the 1984 Summer Olympics in Los Angeles.

She has written eight books on sports, including best-selling Inside Edge, about Olympic figure skating, which was named one of the top 100 sports books of all time by Sports Illustrated in 2002. In 2025, Brennan wrote On Her Game for Scribner, an unauthorized biography of Caitlin Clark exploring Clark's popularity and this unprecedented time in women's sports.

=== Advocacy ===
In 1988, Brennan was elected the first president of the Association for Women in Sports Media. A longtime advocate for women in sports journalism, she started AWSM's scholarship-internship program for female journalism students, which has now honored 200 students. She funds two of the scholarships, which are named after her late parents. In 2023, she came back to AWSM's leadership as chair of the board.

== Personal life ==
Brennan is from Toledo, Ohio. Her relationship with her father in the context of sports fandom is covered in her memoir, Best Seat in the House. In her memoir, she talks about growing up tall—she is 5 feet 11 1/2 inches—and how it has helped her in her career. She was a six-sport athlete at Ottawa Hills High School and plays sports to this day. Brennan is a member of the Board of Trustees of Northwestern University and is a former national trustee at the University of Toledo. She is a member of the Ohio Women's Hall of Fame, Northwestern's Medill School of Journalism Hall of Achievement, Northwestern's Athletic Hall of Fame and the Washington, D.C., Sports Hall of Fame. She has received honorary degrees from Marist University, Tiffin (Ohio) University and the University of Toledo.

== Awards ==
- 1993 Capital Press Women's "Woman of Achievement
- 2002 Reed Sarratt Distinguished Lecturer - University of North Carolina
- 2002 U.S. Sports Academy's Ronald Reagan Award
- 2003 Jake Wade Award from the College Sports Information Directors of America
- 2004 AWSM's Pioneer Award
- 2005 Woman of the Year by WISE (Women in Sports and Events)
- 2006 Chi Omega's Woman of Achievement Award
- 2006 Inaugural Women's Sports Foundation Billie Award for journalism
- 2006 Northwestern University Alumnae Award
- 2007 Northwestern University's Alumni Service Award
- 2013 Ralph McGill Lecturer - the University of Georgia
- 2013 Yale University's Kiphuth Medal
- 2016 AWSM's Service Award
