= Clitus Barbour =

American politician (1837–1906)

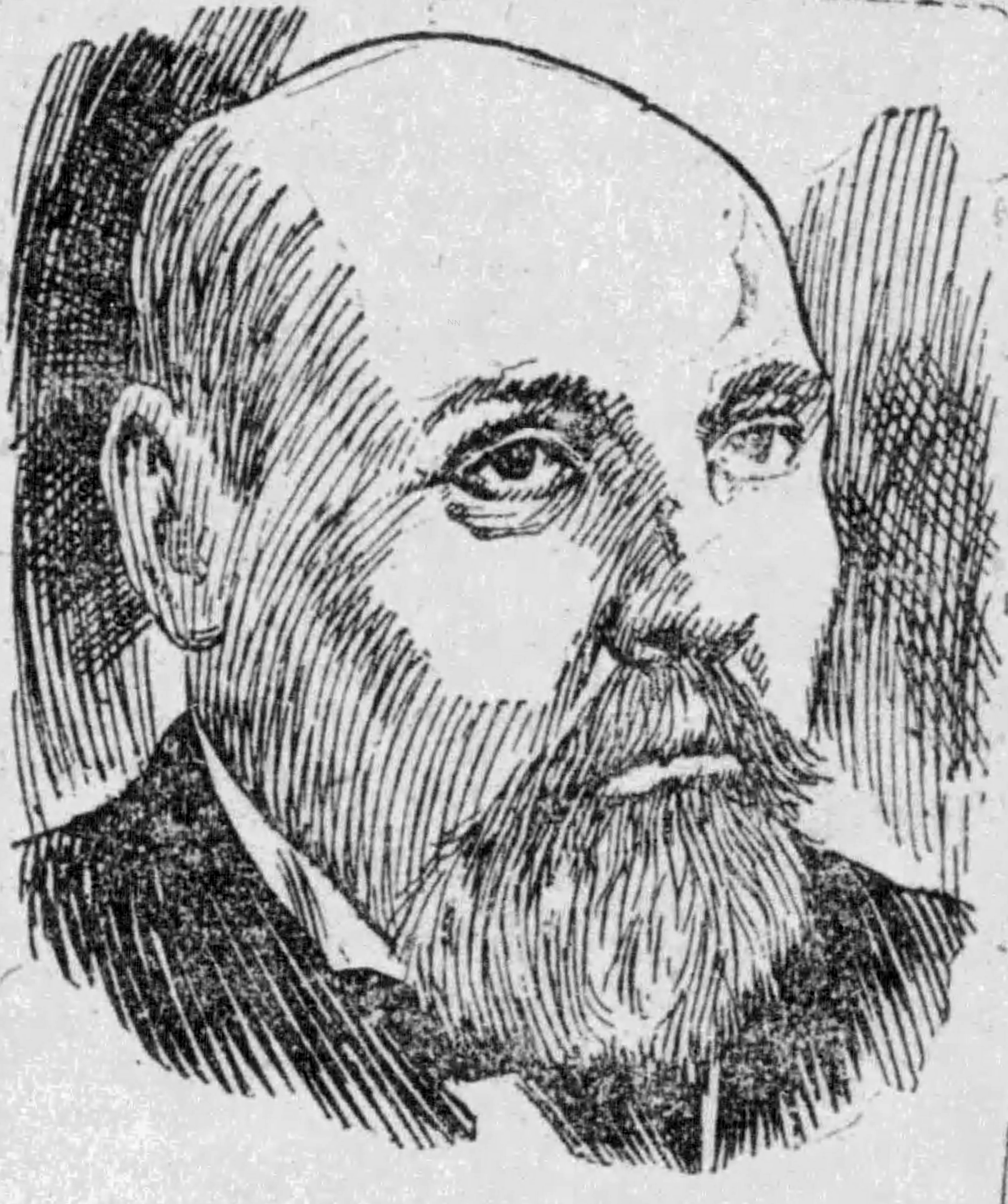
- Barbour c. 1894

Delegate to the Second Constitutional Convention of California
- In office September 28, 1878 – March 3, 1879
- Preceded by: Office established
- Succeeded by: Office abolished
- Constituency: San Francisco

Personal details
- Born: 1837 Knox County, Illinois, U.S.
- Died: April 30, 1906 (aged 69) San Francisco, California, U.S.
- Party: Republican (before 1877); Workingmen's (1877–1881); Democratic (after 1881)
- Education: Knox College; Northwestern University School of Law

Military service
- Allegiance: United States
- Branch/service: United States Army
- Years of service: 1861–1863
- Battles/wars: Civil War

Clitus Barbour (1837 – April 30, 1906) was an American attorney, politician and Georgist who served as a delegate to California's Second Constitutional Convention, held from September 1878 to March 1879, representing San Francisco. He was an early leader in the Workingmen's Party of California, acting as counsel for Denis Kearney and standing as the party's candidate for Congress in California's 1st district in 1879. Barbour was later active in Democratic Party politics, and in 1901 was chosen by mayor James D. Phelan to revise city ordinances.

At the Constitutional Convention, Barbour and fellow lawyer Charles J. Beerstecher were considered leaders of the Workingmen's delegation. Barbour introduced resolutions to adopt a unicameral legislature, nationalize the railroads, and abolish the office of Lieutenant Governor, none of which was approved. In his role as mayor Phelan's advisor, (Note: The San Francisco Chronicle described it as "special commissioner to suggest amendments to the charter and to revise and codify the orders and ordinances of the Board of Supervisors") Barbour recommended that most appointed boards and commissions be abolished in favor of a stronger Board of Supervisors.

== Caricature gallery ==
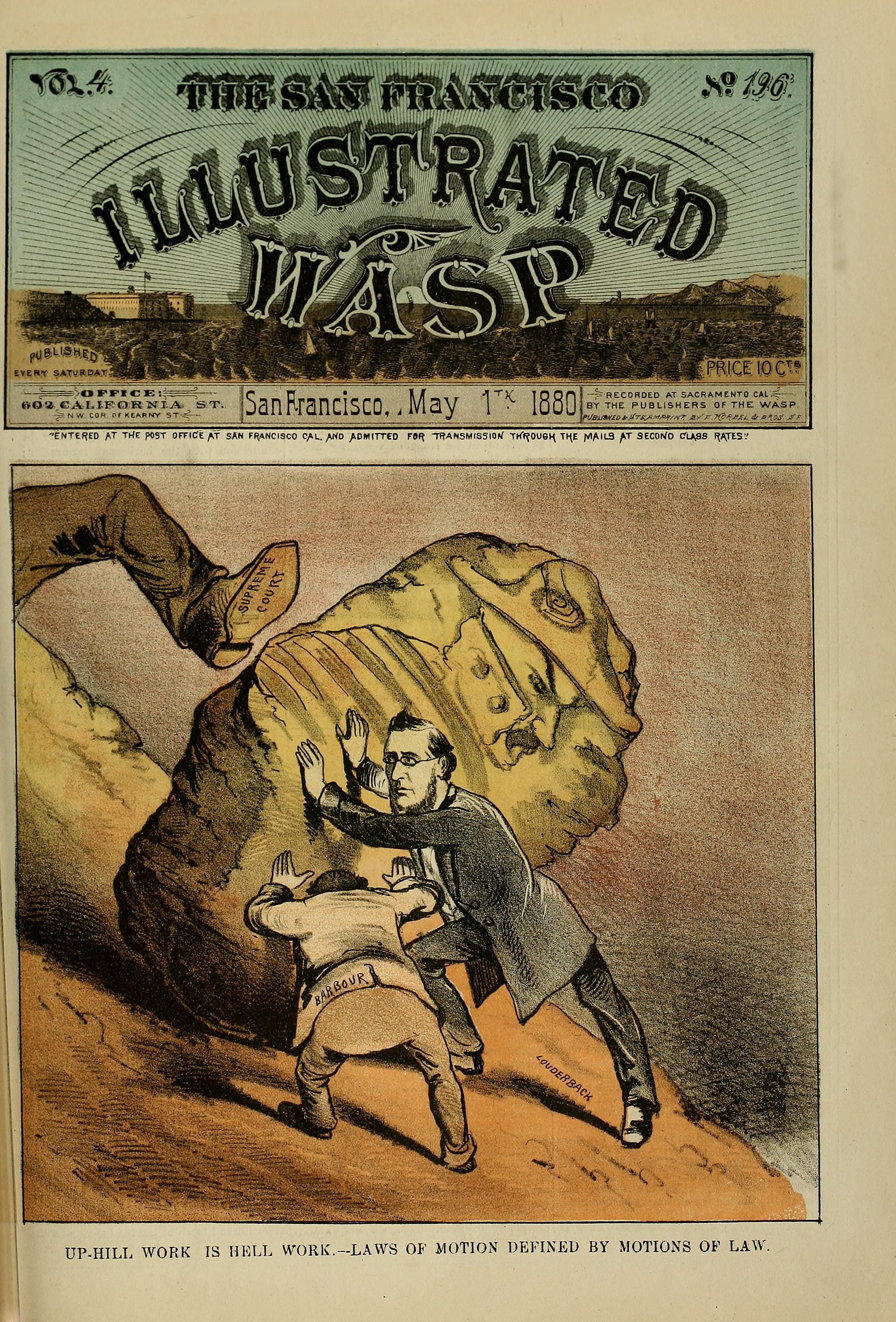
"Uphill Work is Hell Work---Laws of Motion Defined by Motions of Law"

"Free Board... n-try at Drill"

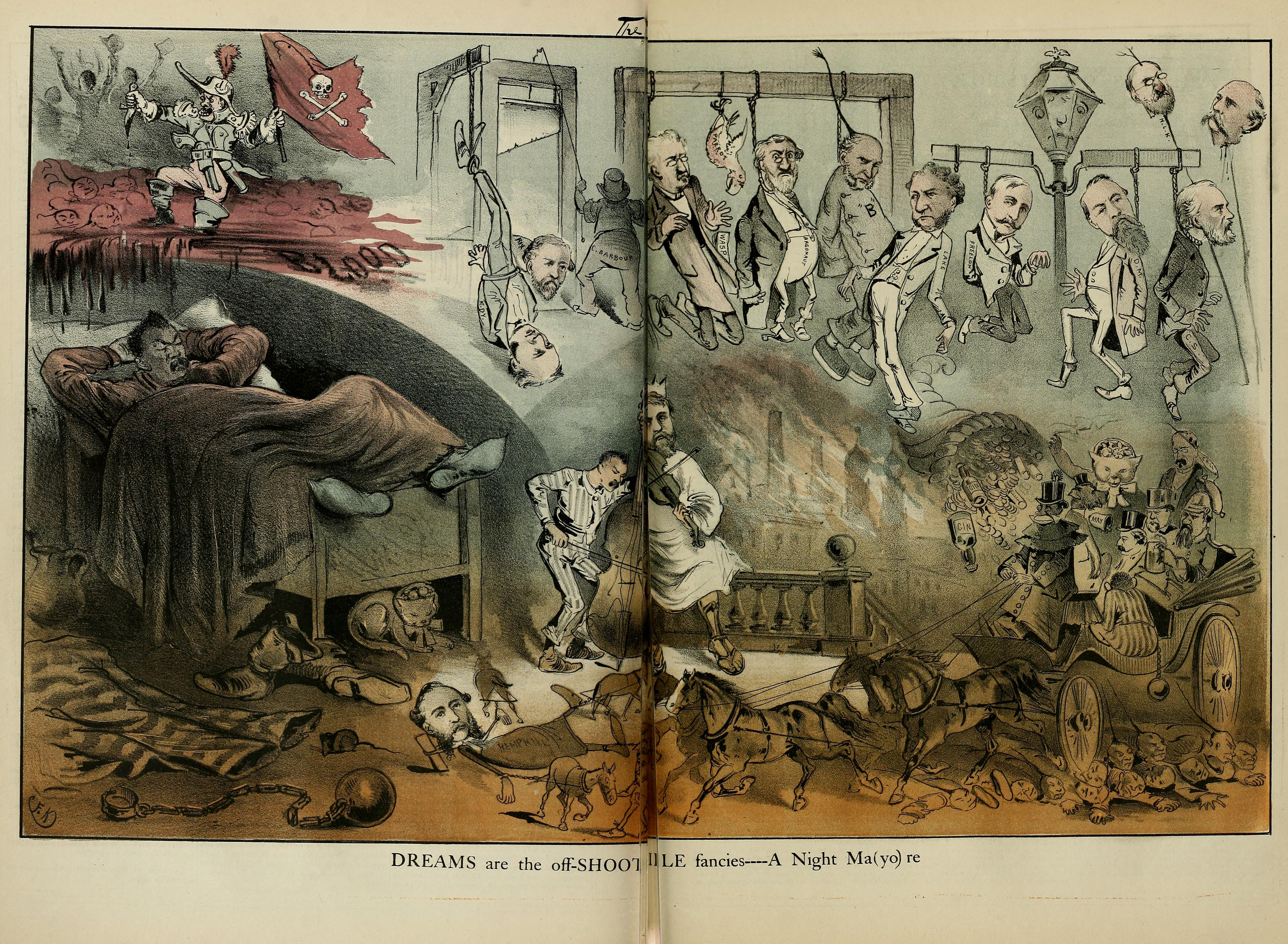
"DREAMS are the off-SHOOT... fancies----A Night Ma(yo)re"

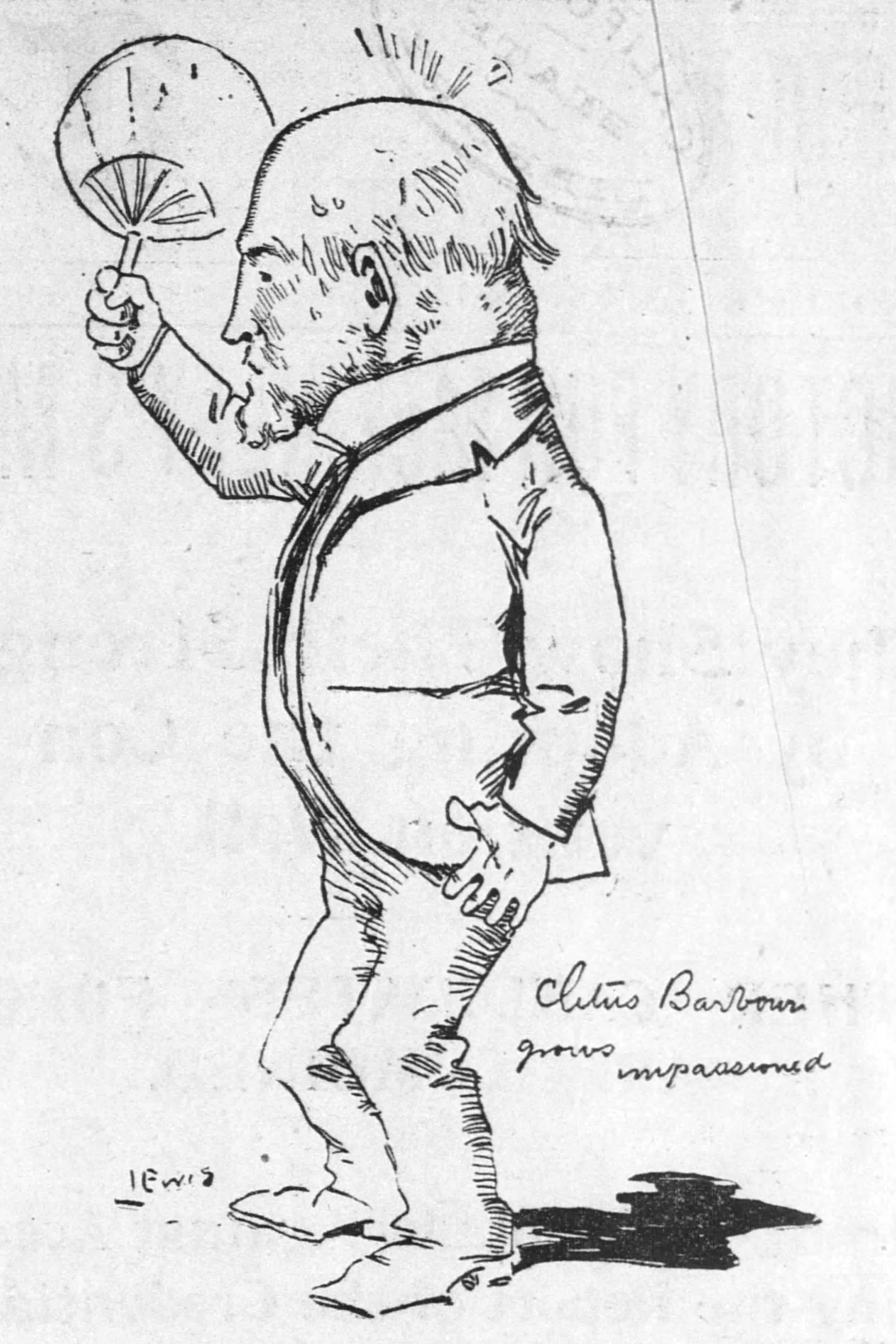
"Clitus Barbour Grows Impatient"

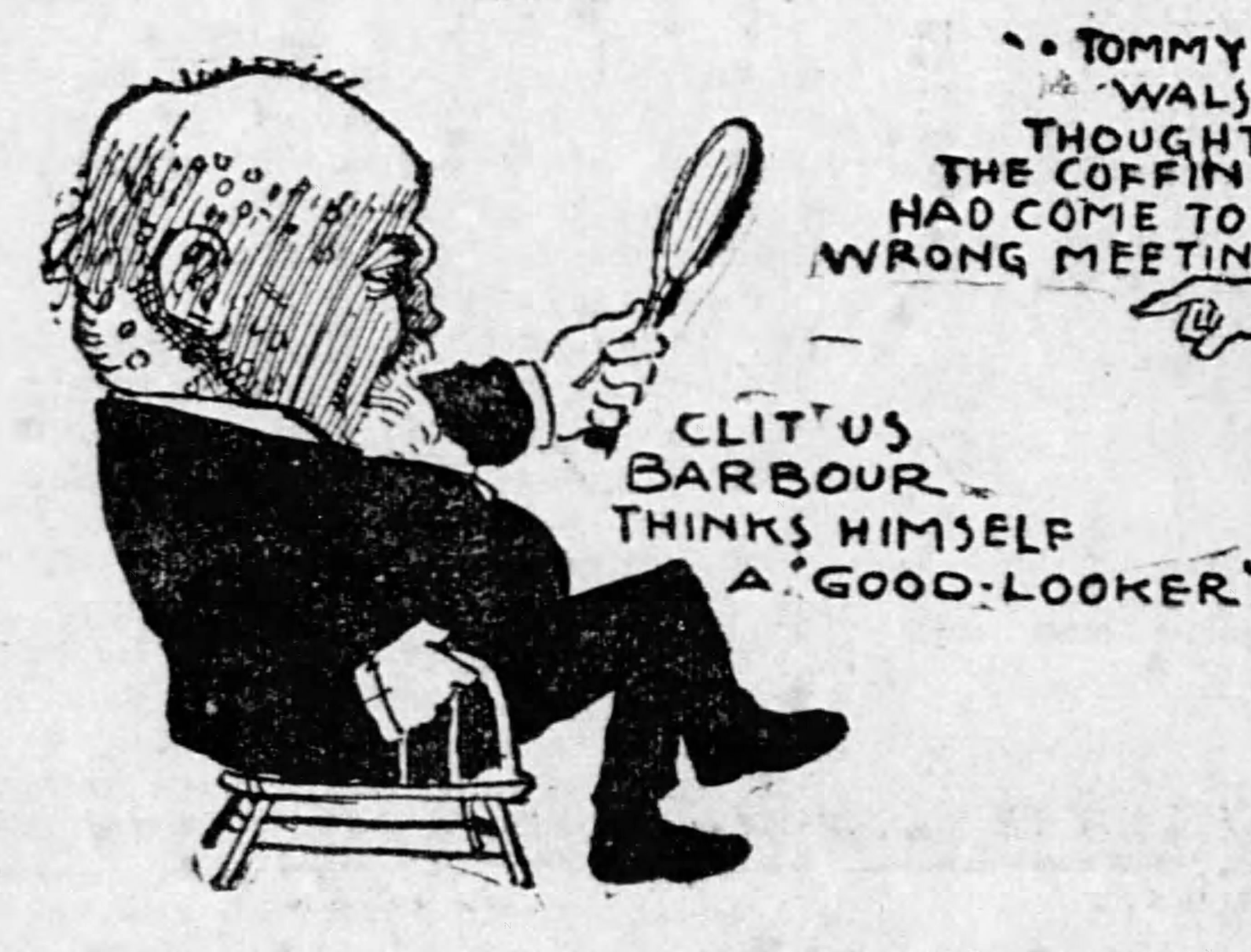
"Clitus Barbour Thinks Himself a Good Looker"

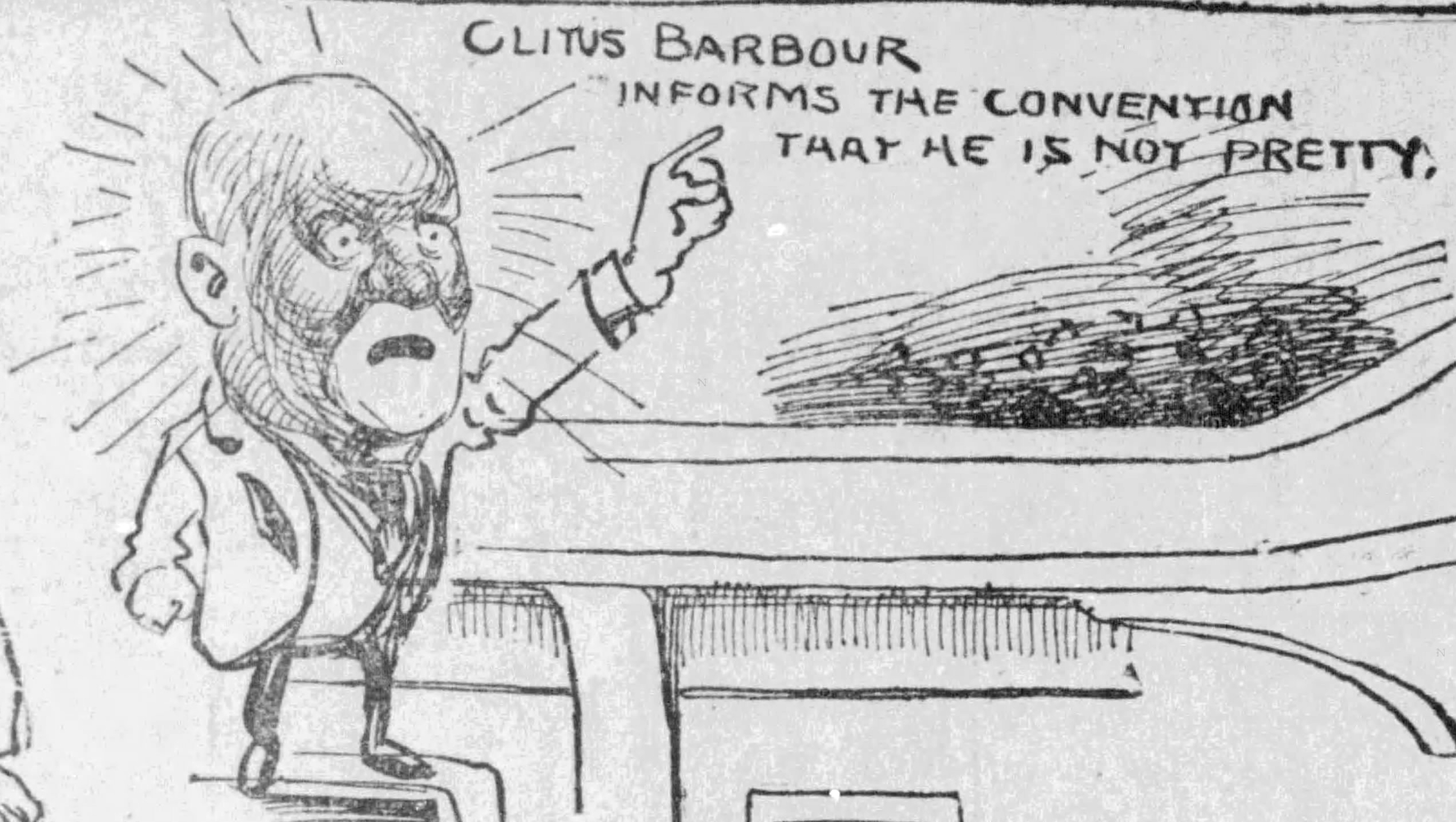
"Clitus Barbour Informs the Convention That He is Not Pretty"

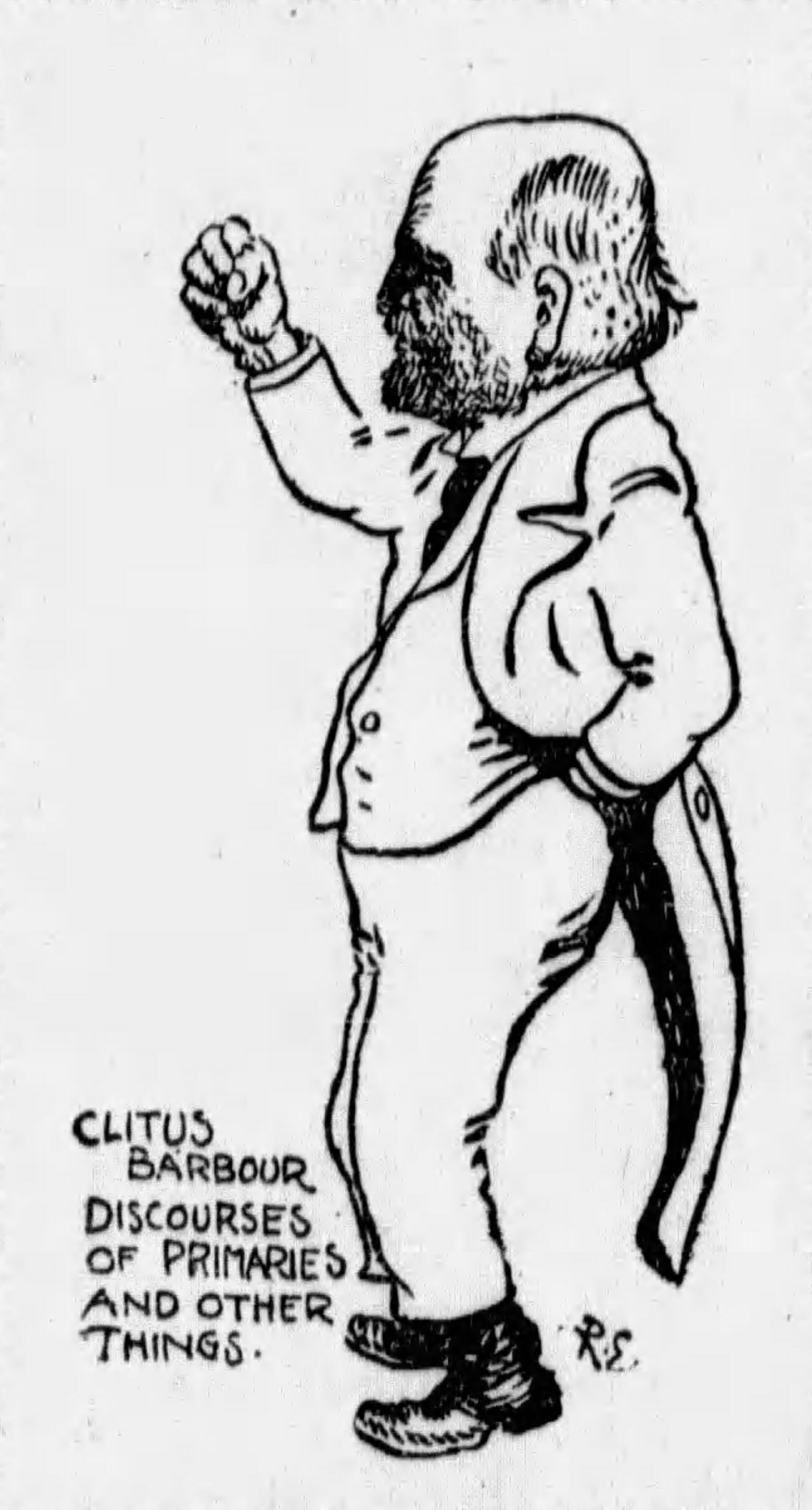
"Clitus Barbour Discourses of Primaries and Other Things"

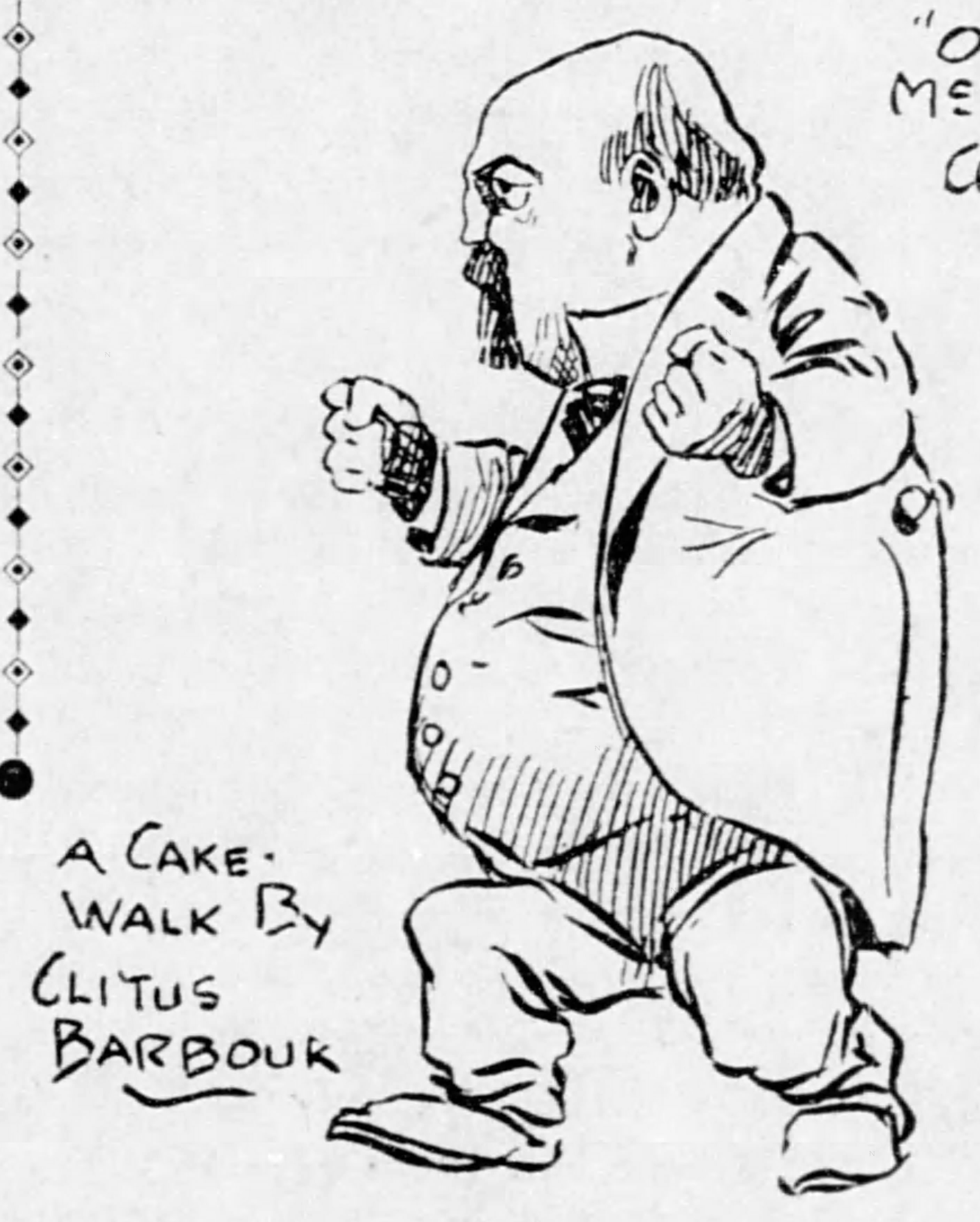
"A Cake Walk by Clitus Barbour"

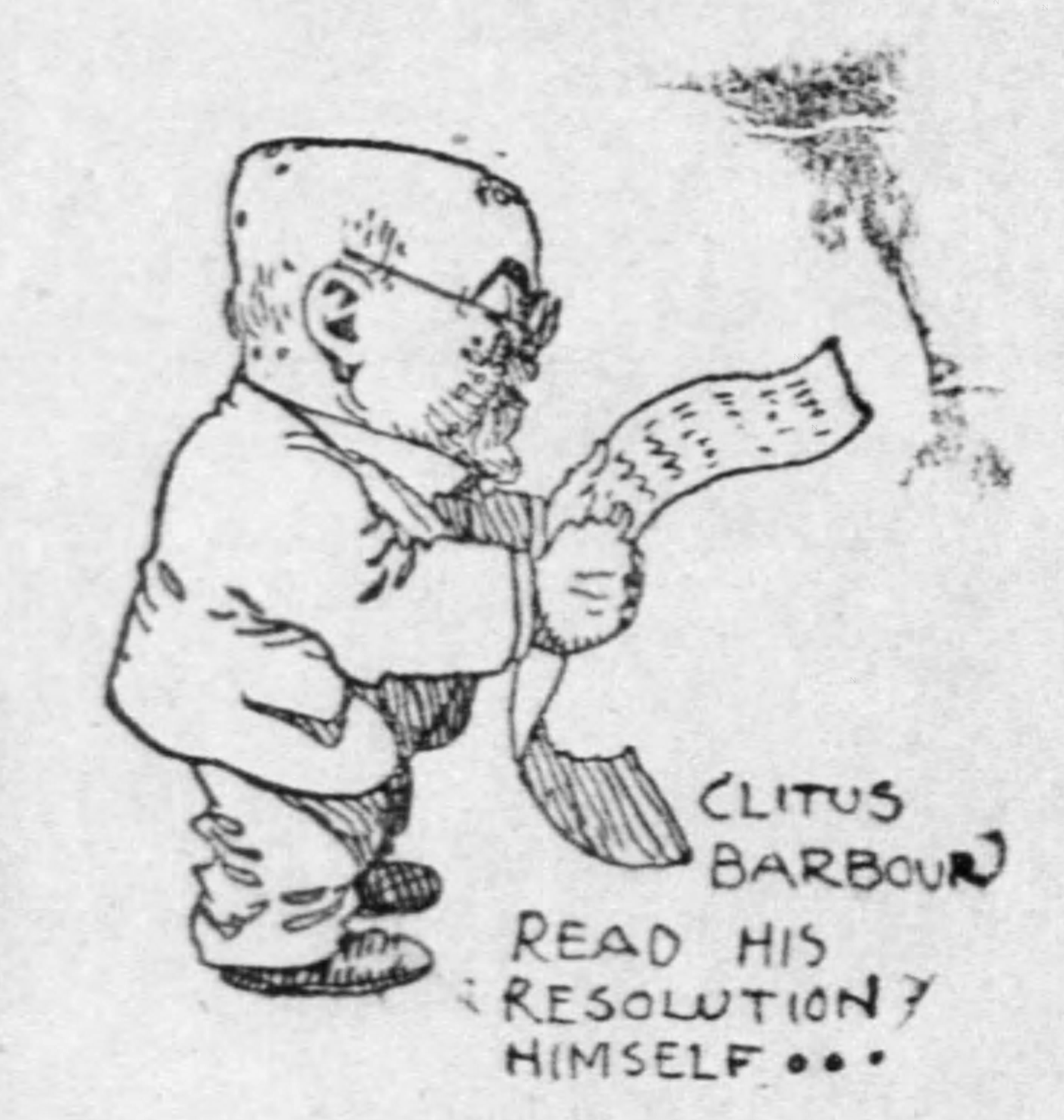
"Clitus Barbour Read His Resolution Himself"

== Electoral history ==
1878–79 United States House of Representatives elections
Party	Candidate	Votes	%
Republican	Horace Davis (incumbent)	20,074	48.4
Workingman's	Clitus Barbour	18,449	44.5
Democratic	Charles A. Sumner	2,940	7.1
Total votes		41,463	100.0
Turnout			
Republican hold			

1888 San Francisco Police Court election
Party	Candidate	Votes	%
Republican	Hale Rix	28,610	52.2
Democratic	Clitus Barbour	26,187	47.8
	Scattering	38	0.0
Total votes		54,835	100.0
Turnout			
