= Los Angeles Express (newspaper) =

Newspaper in California, US (1871–1931)

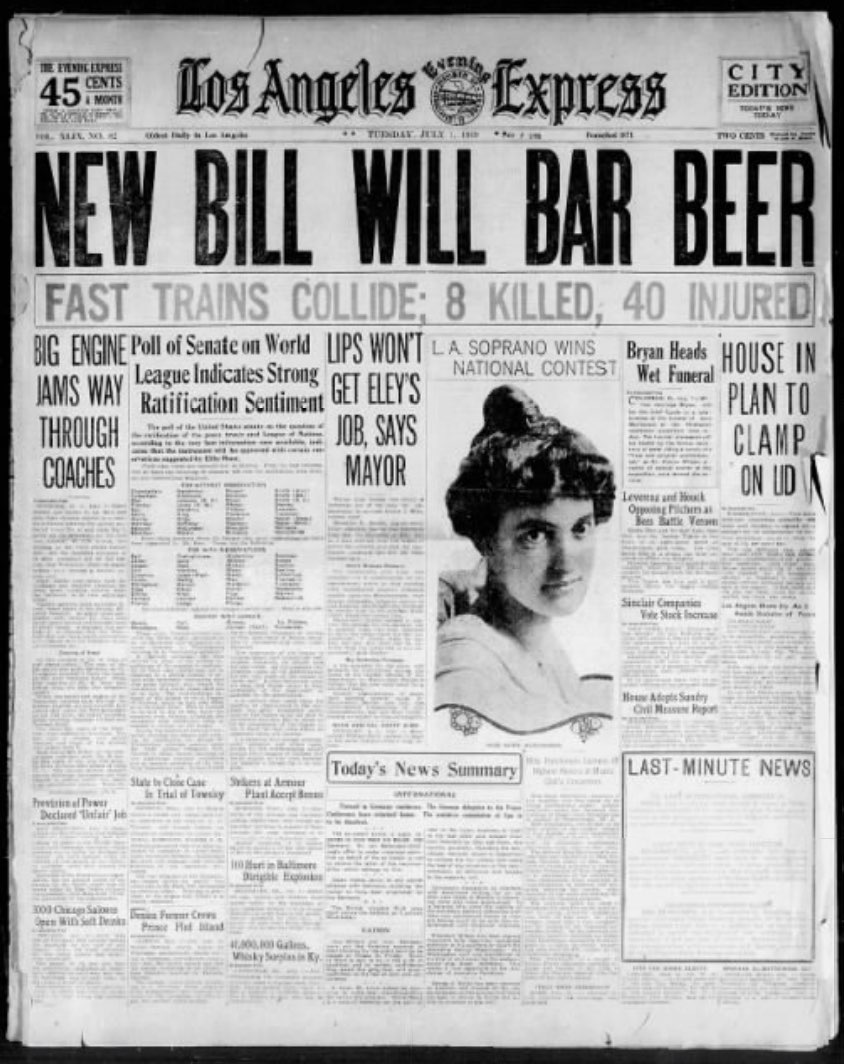
- The cover of the Los Angeles Express detailing the start of the Wartime Prohibition Act on July 1, 1919
- Type: Evening daily newspaper
- Format: Print
- Founder(s): Jesse Yarnell, George Yarnell, George A. Tiffany, J.W. Payton, and Miguel Veredo
- Founded: Los Angeles Express (March 27, 1871-1931). Merged with Los Angeles Herald (1873-1931) to form Los Angeles Herald-Express (1931-1962). In 1963, Los Angeles Herald Express merged with Los Angeles Examiner (1903-1962) to form Los Angeles Herald Examiner (1963-November 2, 1989)
- Language: English

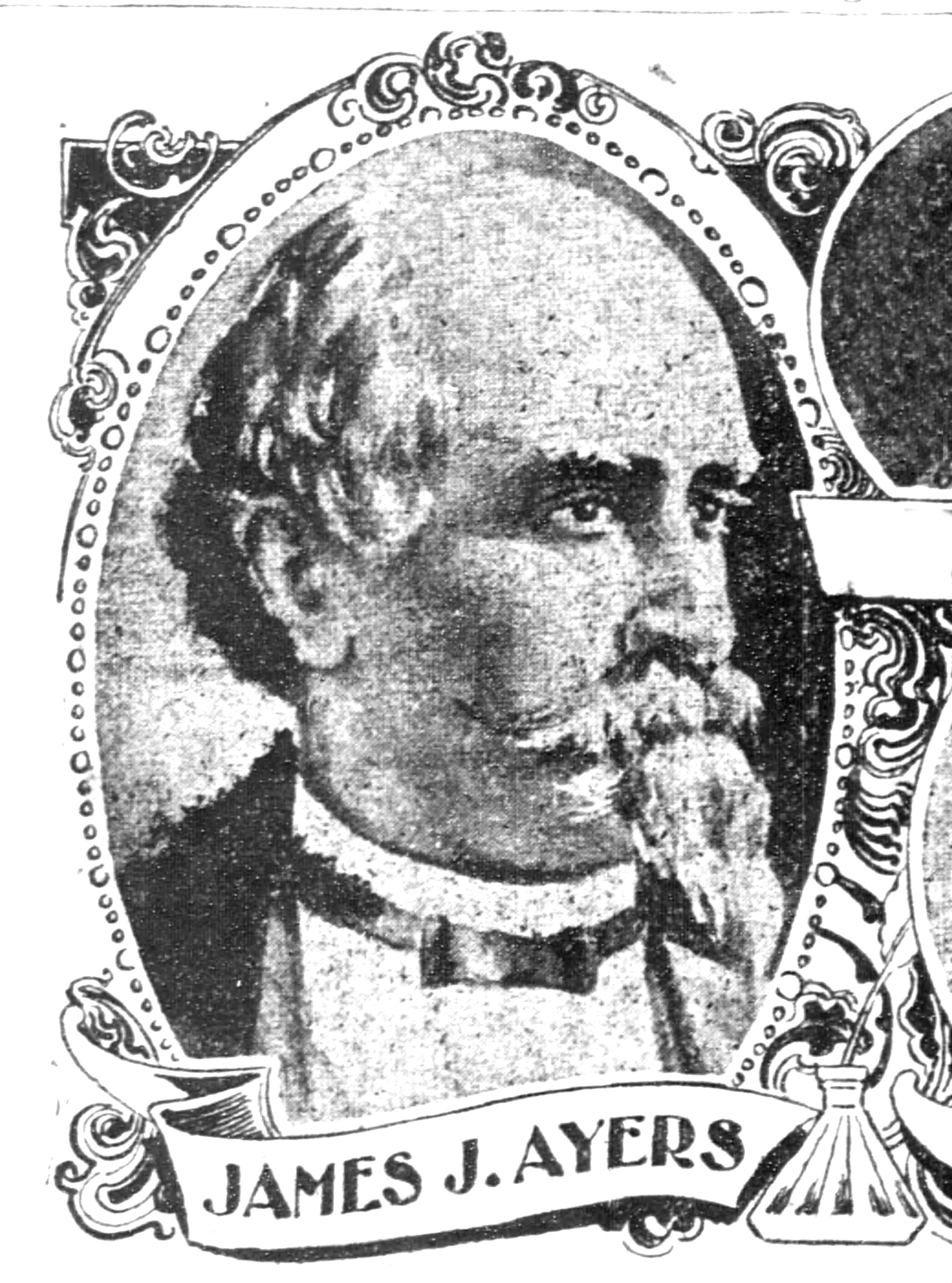
James J. Ayers Express owner and editor, image dated 1897

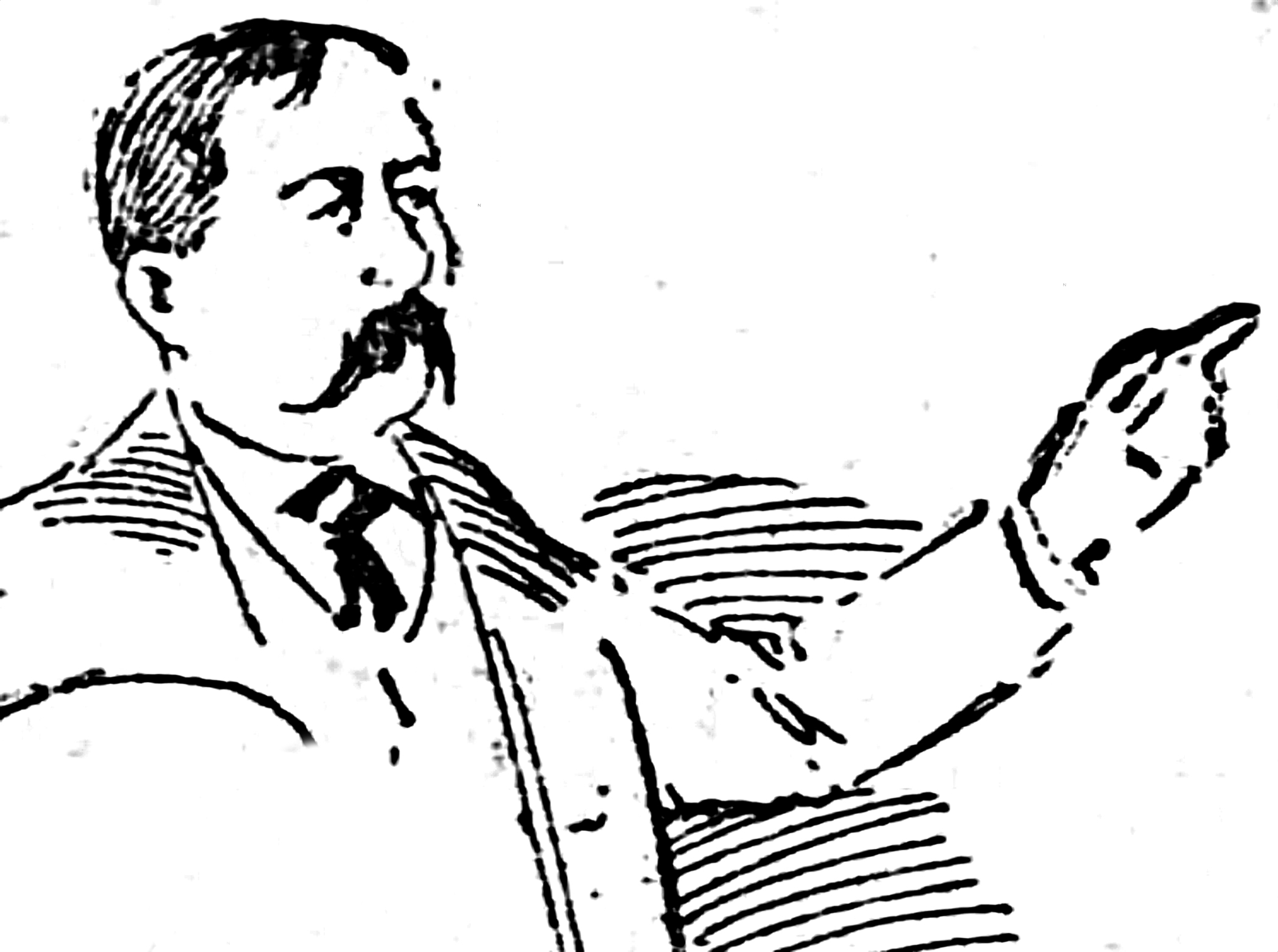
H.Z. Osborne Express owner and editor, image dated 1895

The Los Angeles Express was a newspaper published in Los Angeles in the late 19th and early 20th centuries. Founded in 1871, the newspaper was acquired by William Randolph Hearst in 1931. It merged with the Los Angeles Herald and became an evening newspaper known as the Los Angeles Herald-Express. A 1962 combination with Hearst's morning Los Angeles Examiner resulted in its final incarnation as the evening Los Angeles Herald-Examiner.

== History ==
The Los Angeles Express was Los Angeles's oldest newspaper published under its original name until it combined with the Los Angeles Herald. It was established on March 27, 1871, by five printers, Jesse Yarnell, George Yarnell, George A. Tiffany, J.W. Payton, and Miguel Veredo.

A stock company was organized in March 1875, with James J. Ayers and Joseph Lynch as directors and proprietors.

In 1876 William Halley was the publisher. In 1873 the editor was James J. Ayers, who resigned in October to run for Los Angeles justice of the peace, stating that it would be incompatible to do both jobs at the same time. In 1879 Ayers was owner and editor. In 1882, Ayers severed his connection with the newspaper and was appointed state printer. He was back as "proprietor" again until February 1896 or shortly before.

The "name, goodwill and business" of the Los Angeles Evening Express was sold in 1884 by Ayers and Lynch to H.Z. Osborne and E.R. Cleveland, owners of the evening Republican. "The consideration is understood to be $7,500." The resulting newspaper was the Evening Express and Republican, published daily except Sunday, with the subscription rate of 15 cents a week.

H.Z. Osborne came to Los Angeles from Bodie, Mono County, in May 1884 and bought the Republican, an evening newspaper that had been started by the Herald. In August he bought the Express and combined the two into one paper, running it along with E.R. Cleveland.

In 1886 a stock company was formed, led by Osborne, as editor, Cleveland and John M. Davies. Later, C.C. Allen purchased an interest.

In 1889, Osborne was identified as "chief owner" of the Express.

A company headed by C.D. Willard, secretary of the Los Angeles Chamber of Commerce, took over the ownership in March 1897, and Willard became editor. Fred L. Alles was named business manager.

== Notable employees ==
- Robert W. Kenny, later state attorney general
- Dave Stannard, Los Angeles City Council member, 1942–43
- John Kenneth Turner, publisher, journalist, and author
