= Ben Hook =

Australian cricketer (born 1973)

Personal information
- Born: 5 March 1973 (age 53); Kingswood, South Australia
- Source: Cricinfo, 9 August 2020

Ben Hook (born 5 March 1973) is an Australian cricketer. He played in one first-class match for South Australia in 1997/98. He later became the coach of Glenelg District Cricket Club.

== See also ==
- List of South Australian representative cricketers
