= Adeline Daley =

American sportswriter and humor columnist

- Born: Adeline Helen Sumi; August 31, 1921; Nashwauk, Minnesota, U.S.
- Died: May 15, 1984 (aged 62)
- Education: University of Minnesota
- Occupation: Columnist
- Children: 7

Adeline Helen Daley (née Sumi; August 31, 1921 – May 15, 1984) was one of the first female sportswriters, covering baseball for the San Francisco Call-Bulletin. She later went on to become a nationally syndicated humor columnist for the San Francisco Chronicle for two decades. Her writing was praised as mixing "gentle humor with sly wit and an occasional sharp needle."

== Early life ==
Adeline was born in Nashwauk, Minnesota to Finnish-American parents as one of nine children. At the age of 15 she wrote a letter to the editor at the Duluth News Tribune declaring that she wanted to be "a retired newspaper career woman who would be happy to serve as the newspaper's Iron Range correspondent." Continuing her interest in reporting, she graduated from the University of Minnesota with a B.S. in Journalism in 1943.

== Career ==
After college, Adeline moved to San Francisco where two of her sisters were living and got a job as a copyboy at the San Francisco Call-Bulletin. After slyly exaggerating her knowledge of and enthusiasm for sports, she was given a two-week trial for a reporter position left vacant by Walt Daley, a sportswriter who had just left for active duty in World War II. She studied sports and score-keeping at the local public library, enabling her to pass her trial and cover the high school sports beat for the next three years. However, her editor shortened her byline to "Del" Sumi to disguise the fact that she was a woman to male readers. Moreover, male reporters covering high school sports for competing newspapers were not keen on sharing the beat with a female reporter and stuck her with the worst games when they pooled reporting assignments. Since she would meet fans, coaches, and players at the games she covered, it was eventually widely known and accepted that she was female. For this reason she has been referred to as "female sportswriters' own Jackie Robinson."

In the summer of 1945, Walt Daley returned from war and hit it off with Adeline on his visit back to the newspaper's office. A few months later, he and Adeline married, with Walter insisting he did so to get his job back. She took a break from journalism to raise their seven children.

In 1961, she began writing humorous articles about raising a family for magazines including Coronet and Pageant. In 1963, the San Francisco Chronicle hired her to do a twice-weekly column, "Coffee Break". The column was syndicated nationally, appearing in newspapers throughout California and as far as Michigan's Detroit Free Press and Connecticut's Sunday Herald. Additionally, her column was often quoted in publications such as Sports Illustrated, Variety, and the Los Angeles Times. In addition to her clever humor, Adeline's writing is recognized as transcending the "trapped housewife" narrative of the era.

In the late 1960s and throughout the 1970s, she was also a prolific public speaker, delivering talks to professional groups and women's clubs throughout California and Nevada. She was described as "one of the most amusing and sparkling speakers of the current era, with her wit and humor similar to that of Erma Bombeck."

She died in 1984 after a brief illness. Today, reprints of her "Coffee Break" column occasionally run in the San Francisco Chronicle as part of the "Chronicle Classics" series.
