= The San Francisco Call =

American newspaper

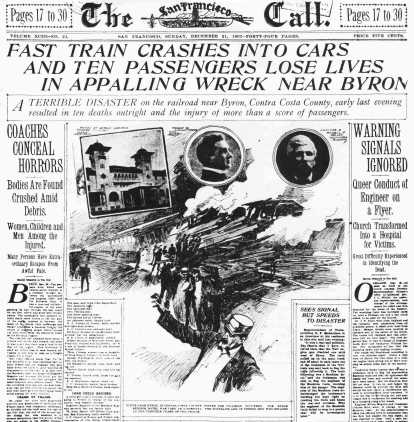
- Cover of The San Francisco Call, December 21, 1902
- Type: Daily newspaper
- Founders: James J. Ayers; David W. Higgins; Charles F. Jobson; Llewellin Zublin; William L. Carpenter
- Founded: 1856
- Ceased publication: 1965
- Language: English
- City: San Francisco
- Country: United States
- ISSN: 2163-4874

The San Francisco Call was a newspaper that served San Francisco, California. Because of a succession of mergers with other newspapers, the paper variously came to be called The San Francisco Call & Post, the San Francisco Call-Bulletin, San Francisco News-Call Bulletin, and the News-Call Bulletin before the name was finally retired after the business was purchased by the San Francisco Examiner.

== History ==
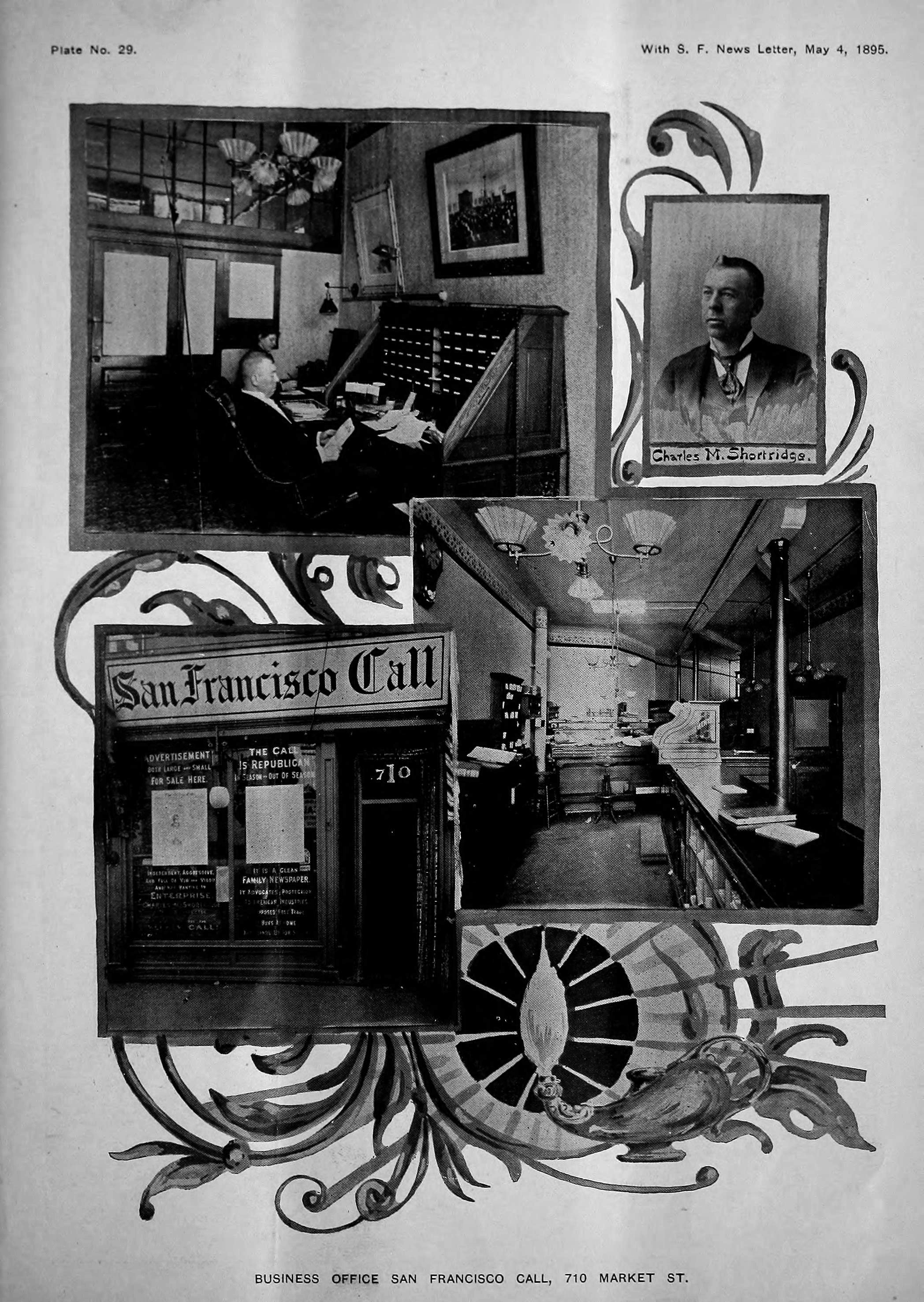
The Call's business office at 710 Market St., 1895

The Call was founded on December 1, 1856, by five printers: James J. Ayers, David W. Higgins, Charles F. Jobson, Llewellin Zublin, and William L. Carpenter. Between December 1856 and March 1895 The San Francisco Call was named The Morning Call, but its name was changed when it was purchased by John D. Spreckels. In the period from 1863 to 1864 Mark Twain worked as one of the paper's writers. It was headquartered at Newspaper Row. The Morning Call was reported purchased by Charles M. Shortridge of the San Jose Mercury for $360,000 in January 1895.

Shortridge became the sole proprietor and editor. He was elected to the California state legislature in 1898 representing the 28th district (San Jose). John McNaught became editor in 1895, when Charles M. Shortridge purchased the paper. He was promoted as general manager of the Call on October 1, 1903, and continued in that position until 1906.

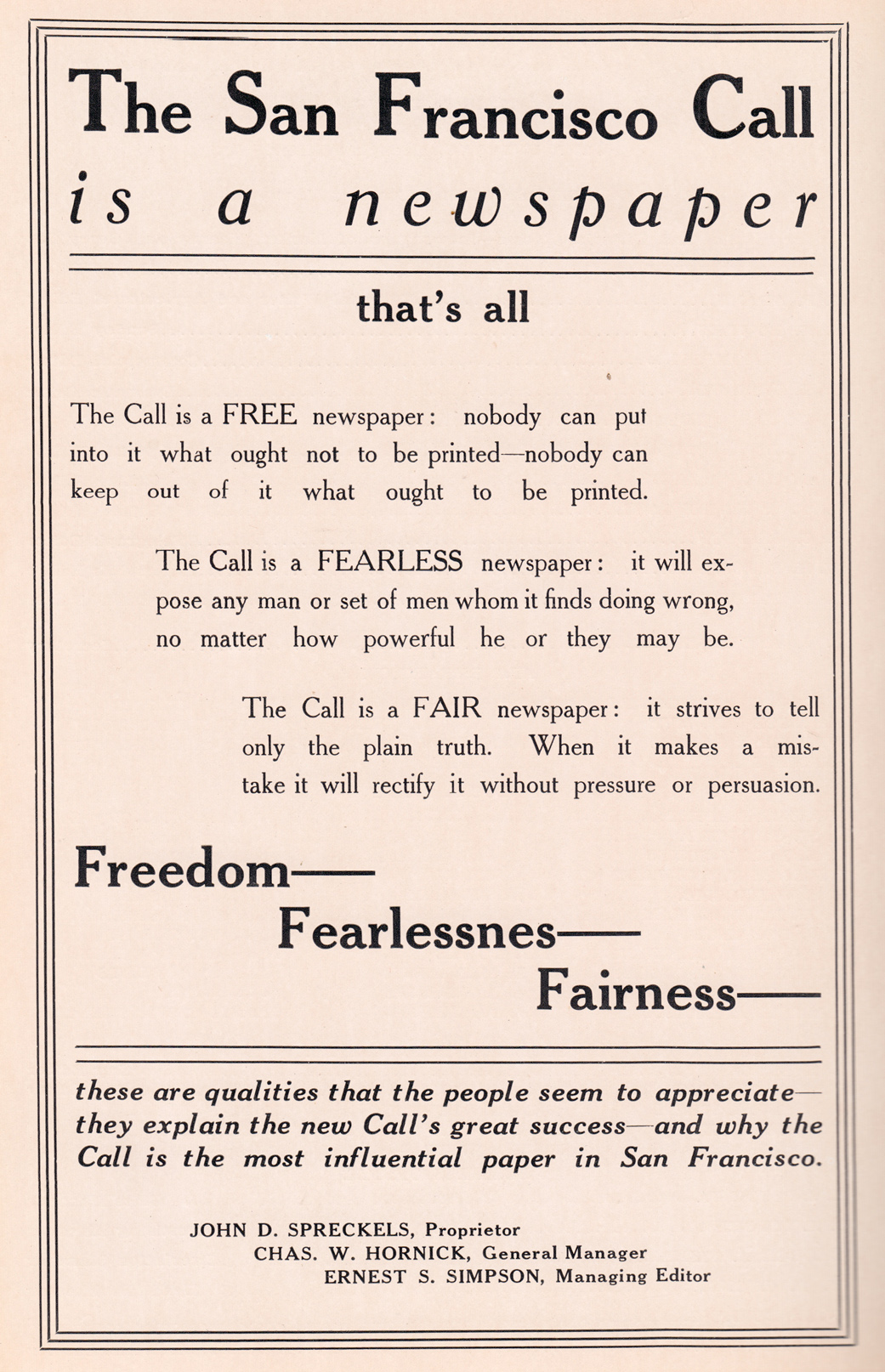
1911 advertisement for The San Francisco Call

In 1913 M. H. de Young, owner of the San Francisco Chronicle, purchased the paper and sold it to William Randolph Hearst who in 1918 brought in editor Fremont Older, former editor of the San Francisco Evening Bulletin. In December of that year (1913), Hearst merged The San Francisco Call with the Evening Post and the papers became The San Francisco Call & Post.

Its most famous editor, crusading journalist Fremont Older, agitated for years against civic corruption and colluded with wealthy San Franciscan sugar baron Rudolph Spreckels to bring down the Mayor, Eugene Schmitz and political boss, Abe Ruef.

On 29 August 1929, the newspaper name was changed again to the San Francisco Call-Bulletin, when the San Francisco Call & Post merged with the San Francisco Bulletin. In 1959 the San Francisco Call-Bulletin merged with Scripps-Howard's San Francisco News becoming the News-Call Bulletin. In 1965, the News-Call Bulletin ceased publication after being purchased by the San Francisco Examiner.

== Notable journalists ==
Bulletin

- William Brown Meloney (1878–1925)
- Bessie Beatty

Call

- Frances Fuller Victor
- Evelyn Wells

Call-Bulletin

- Adeline Daley

== See also ==
- List of San Francisco newspapers
- Central Tower (San Francisco)
- The Montgomery (San Francisco)
