= Kerina Smallhorn =

Australian field hockey player

- Known for: Hockey, Indigenous Sports, Physical Education

Kerina Smallhorn (born 19 July 1972) is a retired female field hockey player from Australia who represented South Australia and New South Wales in the National Hockey League and was an Australian Under 21 Junior World Cup Team, Silver medalist in Barcelona in 1993. Smallhorn also represented the Australian Institute of Sport with tours to the UK, Spain and Germany in the early 1990s.

== State representation ==
- 1990–1993 S.A. Diet Coke Suns, Women's National Hockey League (NHL) Team
- 1990–1993 – Under 21 S.A Team
- 1991 – Captain, Under 21 SA Team
- 1994 - South Australian Sports Institute at Four Nations Tournament

== National representation ==
- 1991 – Australian Institute of Sport (AIS) Overseas Tour – England, Ireland, Spain
- 1992 - Australian Under 21 Junior World Cup Qualifying series
- 1993 - A.I.S. Overseas Tour – Germany, Madrid.
- 1993 - Australian Under 21 Junior World Cup Team - Silver medalist – Barcelona, Spain.

== Notable achievements ==
- 1990, 1991 – South Australian Women's Hockey Assoc (SAWHA) - Team of the Year
- 1992, 1993 - South Australian Sports Institute (SASI) - Most Outstanding Aboriginal Athlete.
- 1995 – New South Wales Institute of Spot - Scholarship Holder

== Education career ==
Smallhorn resides in New South Wales and holds a Bachelor of Education degree with a major in Personal Development, Health, and Physical Education (PDHPE). She works as a teacher, citing her father's influence on her pursuit of education. Of Aboriginal descent, Smallhorn has stated that her teaching goals include supporting student engagement in physical activity and promoting long-term health outcomes.
