= 2003 Report of the Independent Soccer Review Committee =

The Independent Soccer Review Committee published a report in 2003 on the governance of soccer in Australia popularly called the Crawford Report. The committee was announced by the then Minister for Sport Rod Kemp and the Australian Parliament after extensive media publicity surrounding alleged mismanagement and corruption in the previous governing body, Soccer Australia. The impetus for reform was more acute after the public had witnessed the spectacle of the 2002 FIFA World Cup, held in a similar timezone to Australia, which contrasted with the near-bankrupt state of the local game.

== Background ==
A series of incidents highlighted the critical state of Soccer in Australia:

- a) The failure of the Socceroos to qualify for the FIFA World Cup and FIFA Confederations Cup due to there being inadequate funds to send European based players to friendlies and the OFC Nations Cup.
- b) The investigation by the Australian Broadcasting Corporation's Four Corners programme into conflicts of interest and mismanagement at the Board level at Soccer Australia.
- c) The constant in-fighting between political factions and concentration of voting and legislative powers in a relative minority of people perpetuating bad governance.
- d) The overt resistance to accept the government enquiry, and even an initial refusal to accept its recommendations despite the balance of government and public opinion seeking rapid implementation.

== Committee ==
(taken from the published report).

- Mr David Crawford (chair)—retired National Chairman of KPMG and current director of several major companies including BHP Billiton, Foster’s Group, Lend Lease, National Foods and Westpac Banking Corporation.
- Mr Johnny Warren — former captain of the Socceroos and highly regarded football analyst and commentator.
- Mr Bruce Corlett — Chairman of Adsteam Marine Limited and Servcorp Limited, current non-executive director of several companies including Trust Company of Australia Limited and Stockland Trust Group, and past chairman of Australian Maritime Safety Authority.
- Ms Kate Costello — lawyer and former academic, chairman of Bassett Consulting Engineers, chairman of SAAB ITS and director of SAAB Systems, member of the Australian Institute of Company Directors’ Education Committee and management consultant specialising in corporate governance.
- Mr Mark Peters — Chief Executive Officer, Australian Sports Commission and experienced national and international sports administrator. He has considerable experience in reviewing the structures and management of sports and national leagues.
- Secretariat services provided by Mr Stephen Fox and Mrs Jay Davenport.

== Objectives ==
The stated objectives of the review were published as follows:

1. a critical assessment of the existing governance, management and structure of soccer in Australia;
2. solution-based recommendations to deliver a comprehensive governance framework and management structure for the sport that addresses the needs of affiliate organisations and stakeholders. These recommendations may include adjustments to existing governance systems and/or integration of activities and operations;
3. identification of potential impediments to reform and strategies to overcome those impediments; and
4. a plan to implement the recommendations.

== Outcomes ==
Despite initial attempts to scuttle the reform process, the majority of reforms and recommendations have been implemented by the National and State Football Associations. In particular, resistance to reforms at the National level were largely destroyed by the threat of the Australian Sports Commission to withhold funding to Soccer Australia. Restructuring of the governance of the Associations has led to a more democratic approach and the enfranchisement of groups not previously represented (e.g. referees, women's players, etc.). In more substantial terms, it led to the resignation of the Soccer Australia board en masse. The replacement body, the Football Federation of Australia was established with a board led by Frank Lowy. The decision to establish a new governing body was made after the then Australian Soccer Association, now Football Federation Australia chairman Frank Lowy stated that the state of the existing governing body was not repairable and that there was no reasonable prospects of Soccer Australia ever being in a state to be reconstituted.

The Lowy-led board completely replaced Soccer Australia with Football Federation Australia. It quickly achieved financial stability through acquiring high profile sponsors such as Foxtel and Hyundai. In 2005, the Hyundai A-League replaced the National Soccer League as Australia's top-flight domestic competition. The A-League has largely achieved the report's recommendations and the Independent Soccer Review Committee's report to change the form and organisation of domestic competition within Australia. Lowy controlled the A-League and Football Federation Australia until 2018. Having ensured his son Steven Lowy would take over the role in 2015 following his term limit enforced exit, Steven quit after a protracted conflict which culminated in the Lowy family and their supporters failing to stop the movement to split the A-League into an English Premier League style structure independent from the federation, that had one stage caused FIFA to threaten a normalisation committee.

== See also ==
- Australian Federal Government
- Soccer in Australia
