= Barbara Orchard =

Australian cricketer

Personal information
- Born: 14 August 1930 (age 96); Adelaide, South Australia
- Batting: Right-handed
- Bowling: Right-arm medium

International information
- National side: Australia
- Test debut (cap 41): 18 January 1957 v New Zealand
- Last Test: 21 February 1958 v England

Career statistics
Competition	Test
Matches	2
Runs scored	21
Batting average	7.50
100s/50s	0/0
Top score	17*
Balls bowled	102
Wickets	1
Bowling average	26.00
5 wickets in innings	0
10 wickets in match	0
Best bowling	1/18
Catches/stumpings	0/–
- Source: CricInfo, 28 February 2015

Barbara Orchard (born 14 August 1930) is an Australian former cricket player. She made her Test debut against New Zealand in 1957. Orchard played two Tests for the Australia national women's cricket team.
