= Association for Women in Sports Media =

US nonprofit organization

The Association for Women in Sports Media (AWSM) is an American volunteer-managed, 501(c)(3) nonprofit organization founded in 1987. It serves as a support network and advocacy group for women working in sports writing, editing, broadcast and production, and public and media relations. The organization has more than 700 members, including both professionals and students aspiring to careers in sports media.

== Studies involving members of the Association for Women in Sports Media ==
Research involving AWSM members has explored the experiences of women working in sports media. A study conducted by Indiana University students found that while many members felt fairly treated, some reported disparities in assignment opportunities—particularly when covering men’s sports. The study highlighted that unequal access to high-profile work remained a concern among women in the field.

Another study surveyed 200 AWSM members and found that increasing the number of women in sports media positively impacts the visibility of women’s sports in coverage. The survey also revealed that many women have become accustomed to the male-dominated industry culture and are motivated to meet or exceed the standards set by their male colleagues.

Coverage of AWSM’s student chapters has also highlighted the organization’s impact. For instance, the Penn State chapter was recognized for offering mentorship, workshops, and networking opportunities to women aspiring to work in sports journalism. These programs serve as a stepping stone for many students preparing to enter the industry.
