= Independent Sport Panel Report (Crawford Report) =

Australian government report in 2009

In Australia, the Independent Sport Panel Report (Crawford Report) was published in 2009 which summarized the recommendations of an expert panel appointed in 2008 to reform the Australian sports system in preparation for future challenges. The Independent Sport Panel, chaired by David Crawford, published a report which comprised eight recommendations on reform of the structure and programs of the elite sport system and an increased focus on participation and physical activity.

== Committee ==
- David Crawford – retired national chairman of KPMG and director of several major companies, including BHP, Foster's Group, Lendlease, National Foods and Westpac
- Anthony Separovich – creator of Wizard Home Loans and Sydney Rooster Rugby League Club board member
- Sam Mostyn – background in law and corporate affairs, and Australian Football League commissioner
- Pam Tye – Hockey Australia President and former Australian Sports Commission board member
- Colin Carter – senior adviser to the Boston Consulting Group and director of several companies, including Wesfarmers and World Vision

== Objectives ==
- Ensure Australia's continued sporting success
- Better place sport and physical activity as a key component of the government's preventative-health approach
- Strengthen pathways from junior sport to grassroots community sport to elite and professional sport
- Maintain Australia's approach to sports science, research and technology
- Identify opportunities to increase and diversify the funding base for sport through corporate sponsorship, media and any recommended reforms, such as enhancing the effectiveness of the Australian Sports Foundation

== Outcomes ==
The report's findings covered eight areas:

- Defining the national sports vision
- Reforming the Australian Sports Commission to lead the sports system
- Merging institutes of sport
- Building the capacity of national sporting organisations
- Putting sport and physical activity back into education
- Building community sport with people and places
- Ensuring Australia's sports system is open to all
- Sustaining the funding base for sport
