= Jenny Williams (sportsperson) =

South Australian sportswoman

Jenny Williams OAM
- Born: Adelaide, South Australia
- Education: Adelaide College of Advanced Education, Flinders University
- Occupation: Psychologist
- Known for: Psychology, leadership, sport
- Children: 1
- Parent(s): Foster and Von Williams

Jenny Williams is an Australian sports psychologist and athlete who represented South Australia in six sports, namely lacrosse, indoor lacrosse, touch, soccer, cricket, and Australian rules football.

== Lacrosse ==
Williams represented Australia in lacrosse and was a member of the 1986 World Champion Gold Medal team.

She also captained Australia from 1989 to 1992, winning a bronze medal in the 1989 World Cup. She coached the Australian team to a world silver medal in 1997 in Tokyo, Japan. Notably, early in her career she was a member of the Australian team that won its first ever game against the United States in 1981 – the first recorded loss for the US.

Williams also captained or co-captained South Australia to 12 National Championships in lacrosse (11 consecutive wins) and was named in the National Championship team in each of these years. She also received the player of the Nationals Award in 1986 earning best a field votes in every game.

== Cricket ==
Williams represented South Australia in cricket as Wicket-keeper from 1978 to 1982 winning the National Championships in 1981 and being selected as wicket-keeper of the tournament that year.

== Soccer ==
Williams played as either wing or centre forward for College and South Australia (1980–1982) in soccer. ACAE (College) won the League Championship and the Ampol Cup twice.

== Australian Rules Football ==
Williams captained the first South Australian women's team. In 2003, Williams was awarded the AFL Football Woman of the Year award for her contribution to the sport. She has subsequently developed a modified version of the game "Nines". She also worked in the media as a writer of football articles in the South Australian paper The News.

== Professional career ==
Williams was originally a physical education teacher. Throughout her sporting career she has coached junior teams ranging from all of her chosen sports and others such as tennis, basketball and volleyball. She was Head of Department and Sportsmistress at Immanuel College for 10 years and a physical education teacher at Sacred Heart College. In 1989 and 1990, Williams was Acting Women's Advisor to the Minister of Recreation and Sport.

She has also been involved in the Premier's Reading Challenge, a South Australian Government initiative for children's literacy.

In 2020, Williams was hired by Adelaide United FC as a sports psychologist.

== Personal life ==
Jenny Williams is the daughter of Australian Rules footballer Fos Williams, and the sister of Mark and Stephen Williams. Jenny said of her father "Growing up with a father who was a coach you learned to think about how you could take a sport forward, and I suppose I developed a great imagination for what could be achieved in sport."

She was inducted into the South Australian Sport Hall of Fame in October 2013.

In 2022, she was awarded a Medal of the Order of Australia (OAM) for her services to women’s sport.
