= Evelyn Tazewell =

(1893–1983) sportswoman

Evelyn Ruth Tazewell (19 August 1893 – 1983) was an Australian field hockey player, coach, umpire and sporting administrator. She played international hockey for the Australia women's national hockey team.

== Personal ==
Tazewell was born in 1893 at New Town, Hobart. She was the only daughter of George Webber Tazewell, shopkeeper and champion cyclist, and his wife Florence, née Hawkins, both English born. In 1914, the family moved to Adelaide where she embarked on a career in hockey.

== Playing career ==
Tazewell started playing hockey around 1914, playing in both the full-back and goalkeeper positions. She joined the Aroha (now Adelaide) Hockey Club and the South Australian Women's Hockey Association (now Hockey SA, based at the State Hockey Centre (South Australia)). Having captained the South Australian State team against Western Australia in Adelaide in 1918, she remained its captain from 1920 to 1936.

Tazewell was selected in the Australian team (Australia women's national hockey team) in 1925, 1928, 1929 and in 1930-36. In 1930, the team entered the Empire Tournament in South Africa, and toured Britain and Europe. In 1935, she captained Australia against New Zealand in Melbourne. In the next year, she was vice-captain when Australia played at the International Federation of Women's Hockey Associations tournament in the United States of America.

She retired from playing hockey in 1940, but continued coaching Aroha, Woodlands Church of England Girls' Grammar School (who became champions under her guidance), Adelaide Girls' High School and the South Australian team (1946–51).

== Sports administration career ==
During a sporting administration career that spanned four decades to the 1960s, she was a member of the South Australian executive, selection and umpires committees.

Tazewell was president of the All-Australian Women's Hockey Association (now Hockey Australia) in 1920 and State delegate in 1920-65.

After World War II, she helped to convert an almond and orange orchard into the Women's Memorial Playing Fields at St Mary's, Adelaide; the grounds were dedicated to Australian nurses who had perished in Banka Strait, off Sumatra, in 1942.

Tazewell was a delegate to the International Federation of Women's Hockey Associations in 1953 and 1959. In 1972 she retired as an umpire.

== Awards and recognition ==
Her name is inscribed in the Sport Australia Hall of Fame in Melbourne and she was an inaugural inductee to the Hockey Australia Hall of Fame.

Hockey SA have named an umpiring award after her - the "Evelyn Tazewell Outstanding Umpire Service to Women’s Hockey" - which is presented annually at the Hockey SA Awards Night.

Her Australian blazer and hockey stick are displayed at the State Hockey Centre (South Australia) in Adelaide.
