= Marg Ralston =

Marg Ralston AM
- Other name: Margaret Mary Ralston
- Occupation: Journalist
- Known for: Sports journalism, administration, ministerial advisor

Marg Ralston AM is an Australian sports journalist, editor, and government advisor. She is noted for being the first woman appointed as a sports editor of a major metropolitan paper in Australia. She is currently a Ministerial Adviser for the South Australian Government, providing recreation and sport advice to Minister Hon. Leon Bignell MP.

== Contribution to women's sport ==
Ralston was appointed Sport Editor for one of Adelaide's two major newspapers, The News in 1979. She spent 12 years at that post, until the paper closed in 1992. During her watch, elite, amateur and local sport, and in particular women's sport, received strong media coverage, due to the competition between the two newspapers and due to Ralston's editorial focus.

Ralston continued her involvement in sport through ministerial advisory including 11 years as executive director of the Australian Olympic Committee/SA Olympic Council from 1992 – 2003.

Ralston is involved in a range of sports advisory roles including helping to compile a list of the 50 most influential people in South Australian sport.

== Awards ==
- Member in the Order of Australia AM 2001 For service to amateur and professional sport, particularly in South Australia, as an administrator and journalist.
- Honoured at the South Australian Sports Awards in 2012 for her contribution to sport, with a new award named in her honour.
